= Damalas =

Dynastic House of Genoese origin

Zaccaria de Damalà Ζαχαρία ντε Δαμαλά
- Arms of the Zaccaria de Damalà family, differenced from the plain arms of the Genoese Zaccaria with the augmentation of honour of golden bezants in the second and third quarterings. (Note: Following the 1275 marriage of Benedetto I Zaccaria to the sister of Emperor Michael VIII Palaiologos, his eldest son Benedetto II formally adopted the double barrelled surname Palaiologos-Zaccaria. This was visualized heraldically, most notably by adding a blue chief containing an "eagle-bearing three-towered castle," which evolved into the Imperial Double-Headed Eagle as a supporter. The Imperial arms were sometimes marshalled with the Zaccaria arms to demonstrate imperial legitimacy, or used outright as seen in the 1450s by John Asen Zaccaria.)
- Parent family: Zaccaria; Palaiologos
- Country: Byzantine Empire; Principality of Achaea; Republic of Venice; Ottoman Empire; Greece; United States
- Current region: United States, Greece
- Etymology: Barony of Damalà Name Evolution: Palaiologos-Zaccaria (Imperial union, 13th–14th c.); Zaccaria de Damalà (Baronial title, 14th–16th c.); Damalà (Latin surname, 16th–19th c.); Damalas (Hellenized form, 19th c.–Present)
- Founded: c.1320 (title); 16th century (surname)
- Founder: Martino Zaccaria (title); Antonio Damalà (surname)
- Current head: Constantine Zaccaria de Damalà (b. 1992)
- Final ruler: Centurione III
- Titles: List: King and Despot of Asia Minor (de jure); Prince of Achaea; Despotus Romaniae; Marquis of Bodonista (jure uxoris); Baron of Damala; Baron of Chalandritsa; Baron of Arcadia; Baron of Estamira; Baron of Veligosti (titular); Lord of Phocaea; Lord of Chios; Lord of Samos; Lord of Kos; Lord of Ikaria; Lord of Lesbos (de jure); Lord of Tenedos (de jure); Lord of Oinousses (de jure); Lord of Marmara (de jure); Patrician and Noble of Genoa; Patrician and Noble of Venice; Hidalgo (Kingdom of Castile)
- Heirlooms: Zaccaria Cross
- Estate: List: Castle of Chios; Castle of Damalà; Castle of Chalandritsa; Castle of Chlemoutsi; Castle of Kyparisia; Castle of Aetos; Zaccaria Palace of Genoa; Stratigato of Dafnonas; Damalà Palace of Ermoupoli

The House of Zaccaria de Damalà—now Damalas— (Italian: Damalà, Greek: Δαμαλάς) is a formerly ruling family of Genoese origin, established in the 14th century on the Greek island of Chios, due to the marriage of Admiral Benedetto I Zaccaria with a sister of Byzantine Emperor Michael VIII Palaiologos; it later received the hereditary dignity of “King and Despot of Asia Minor” by grant of the Latin emperor in 1325, and ultimately produced the last ruling dynasty of the Principality of Achaea in the 15th century.

After the dissolution of the family's Lordship of Chios in 1329, they concentrated their efforts on the Barony of Damalà in the Principality of Achaea, which they previously acquired through marriage to Jacqueline de la Roche, heiress of the dukes of Athens. In time, they became the principality's last titled rulers, marrying in the process with other major houses ruling over Greek territories and in the Balkans, most notably, the Palaiologos, Asen and Tocco families. In the decades following the loss of their domains in the mid-15th century, the Zaccaria element of their name was gradually dropped, reduced to Damalà in reference to their former Achaean seat, and by the early 19th century, Hellenized to Damalas.

From the 15th to 20th centuries, the family maintained noble standing under Ottoman and Venetian dominion, particularly on Chios until its 1913 induction into the independent Kingdom of Greece, where they also held prominence since its 1832 founding through civic leadership, recurring royal association, and integration into aristocratic and political life. Their presence was also distinctly marked in the cities of Ermoupoli, Constantinople, Athens, and Piraeus, where they remained influential into the 20th century, recently re-establishing public heritage ties in the region in the 2020s.

The Damalas that are descended from the Zaccaria dynasty share their name with other unrelated families of purely Byzantine origin and Orthodox faith, bearing the name Damalas, and who appear as early as 1230 in the Thracesian Theme of the Eastern Roman Empire. Descendants of these Greek families also settled on Chios and other nearby regions, and are often confused with the Genoese-descended Zaccaria de Damalà.

== Origins and Genoese lordships (1267–1346) ==
=== Settlement in Byzantium ===
The family's presence in the Aegean began with Admiral Benedetto I Zaccaria, who first established the family's influence in the region with his elder brother, Manuele Zaccaria, when they received the Lordship of Phocaea in 1267, obtaining the region's alum mines. Benedetto subsequently cemented his status by marrying a sister of Emperor Michael VIII Palaiologos in 1275 and securing the Lordship of Chios in 1304. Following this union, the dynasty formally fused their Genoese identity with imperial legitimacy. Benedetto I's son, Benedetto II, formally adopted the name Palaiologos, seen in legal acts of 1311 and 1316, as "Benedictus Paleologus Zaccaria." This dynastic identity was propagated through their coinage; silver issues from the Chios mint bore the legend "P 7 B Z", interpreted as "Paleologus & Benedictus Zacharia." The family further asserted this identity through their heraldry, marshalling the Zaccaria and Palaiologos arms. While ruling as independent monarchs, they maintained the diplomatic fiction of being "SERVI IMPERATORIS" (Servants of the Emperor) on their currency, balancing their autonomy with their claim to imperial blood.

=== The accquisition of Damalà ===
The dynasty's expansion into mainland Greece began in 1311, following the death of Renaud de la Roche at the Battle of Halmyros. In the aftermath of this defeat, Benedetto II became the suzerain of the Barony of Damalà, acting as the guardian of Renaud's underage heiress, Jacqueline de la Roche. This arrangement was solidified into a hereditary possession in the 1320s, when Benedetto's son, Martino Zaccaria, 3rd Lord of Chios, married the de la Roche heiress, merging the founding dynasty of the Duchy of Athens with the Zaccaria.

According to the Chronicle of the Morea, the original baronies were twelve, including Veligosti (Veligurt), whose fief was the argolid region of Damalà. After the fall of Veligosti around 1300, Damalà would become the seat of the barony, by then ruled by the Zaccaria.

The dynastic attachment to the "Damalà" title was such that Martino minted a specific issue of tornese coins bearing the legend "+ CCASTE DAMALA" (Castrum Damala), separate from his Chian currency. This coinage, dated between 1325 and 1329, marks the first physical evidence of the Zaccaria fusing their Aegean sovereignty with the mainland Damalà title.

Martino had four sons, Bartolomeo with his first, Venetian, Ghisi wife, and Centurione, Octaviano, and Manfredo with his second wife, Jacqueline de la Roche. Bartolomeo died in 1334, and though he had a daughter, Marulla, according to the Assizes of Romania, the Zaccaria family, as Latins in Frankish Greece, observed Salic Law which only allowed for male succession in their fiefdoms.

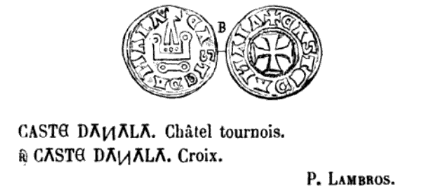
Denier Tournois coin, minted in the Barony of Damalà.

Thus his eldest brother Centurione succeeded him as Baron of Damalà; held by Bartolomeo since 1317. He was also given control of his father's other possessions in the Morea, sometime during Martino's imprisonment for having broken with Constantinople. This began the dynastic struggle of the Achaean baronies on the death of Philip of Taranto; the Latin Emperor ruling as Prince of Achaea. By supporting Robert of Taranto, son of titular Latin Emperor Philip II, Centurione obtained the recognition of his position and the confirmation of his rights, which had been violated several times in the past by the Angevin princes.

Martino had continued the system of alliances through the marriages of his children. Bartolomeo married Guglielma Pallavicini, who had brought the Marquisate of Bodonitsa as a dowry. Centurione married a daughter of the epitropos (steward or bailiff) of Morea, Andronikos Asen, son of Bulgarian Tsar Ivan Asen III and Irene Palaiogina. This Asenina lady brought to Centurione the regions of Lysarea and Maniatochorion. Through this marriage, the descendants of Centurione also professed to be descended from the major aristocratic families of Constantinople, such as the Palaiologoi, while holding ties with the Kantakouzenoi, as empress Irene Asenina, sister of the Asenina of Centurione was married to John VI Kantakouzenos, emperor of the Eastern Roman Empire. After the union of Centurione and this Asenina lady, the Zaccaria started to practice Orthodox-rite weddings until the time of John Asen Zaccaria.

=== Imperial service and the Crusade of Smyrna ===
After spending eight years in captivity for siding with the Latin Emperor over the Byzantine Emperor in 1329, Martino was released from his imprisonment. This was only permissible upon the condition that he swear an oath to remain in Genoa, through the intervention of Pope Benedict XII and Philip VI of France in 1337. He swore to never again, by word or deed, oppose the empire. He was then treated favorably by the emperor though, whom gave him a naval command as protocomes, as well as a few castles as compensation for his losses. This command would be succeeded by his second son Centurione.

The Pope, who had considered the Emperor's ejection of Martino from Chios to be a breach of faith and a usurpation, and the imprisonment to be "contrary to God and justice," then intervened in Martino's favour. He ruled that Martino's oath was not binding, because it had been extracted, not at Martino's free will, but “by the force of imprisonment,” and he, therefore, ordered the Latin Patriarch of Constantinople to release Martino and his warrantors from their oath.

This papal letter to the Patriarch was dated 1343. Two years earlier, Hugh IV, King of Cyprus, and the Hospitaller Knights of Saint John had appealed to the Doge of Venice and to the Pope, Benedict XII, for aid in a Crusade against the Turks. Benedict seems to have been unenthusiastic, but Clement V became Pope in May 1342, and he was more willing to consider the proposal.

The situation was complicated at this time because the Turk Oumour of Smyrna was an ally of John VI Cantacuzene, who had usurped the Byzantine throne in 1341, while the Ottoman emir, Ourkhan, supported the Regent Anne, mother of the legitimate Emperor John V. Anne wrote to the Pope in 1343, appealing for aid against Oumour. The Pope answered this combined appeal by preparing a fleet consisting of ships from Cyprus, Venice and the Knights of St. John and on 16 September 1343 placed Martino in command.

The family gained imperial favor once again, with Martino leading this crusade on behalf of the Byzantines to retake coastal lands of Anatolia. On 17 January 1345, while attending a victory Mass at the Cathedral of St. John in Smyrna, the church was stormed by Turkish troops. Martino was killed at the altar and beheaded, his head presented to Umur Pasha as a trophy.

=== Expulsion from Chios ===
Upon his father's death, Centurione inherited his father's one-half of the barony of Chalandritsa, the naval command of protocomes, and the fortresses of Stamira and Lysaria, while already possessing the title to the barony of Damalà since 1334. These improved relations with the Byzantines were cultivated by Centurione, and with his return to Chios as protocomes, he reclaimed his paternal estates and jointly exploited the lands of Chios and Phocea with a few other Genoese nobles, from the Ziffo, Corressi, Argenti, and Agelasto families, whom the emperor had entrusted.

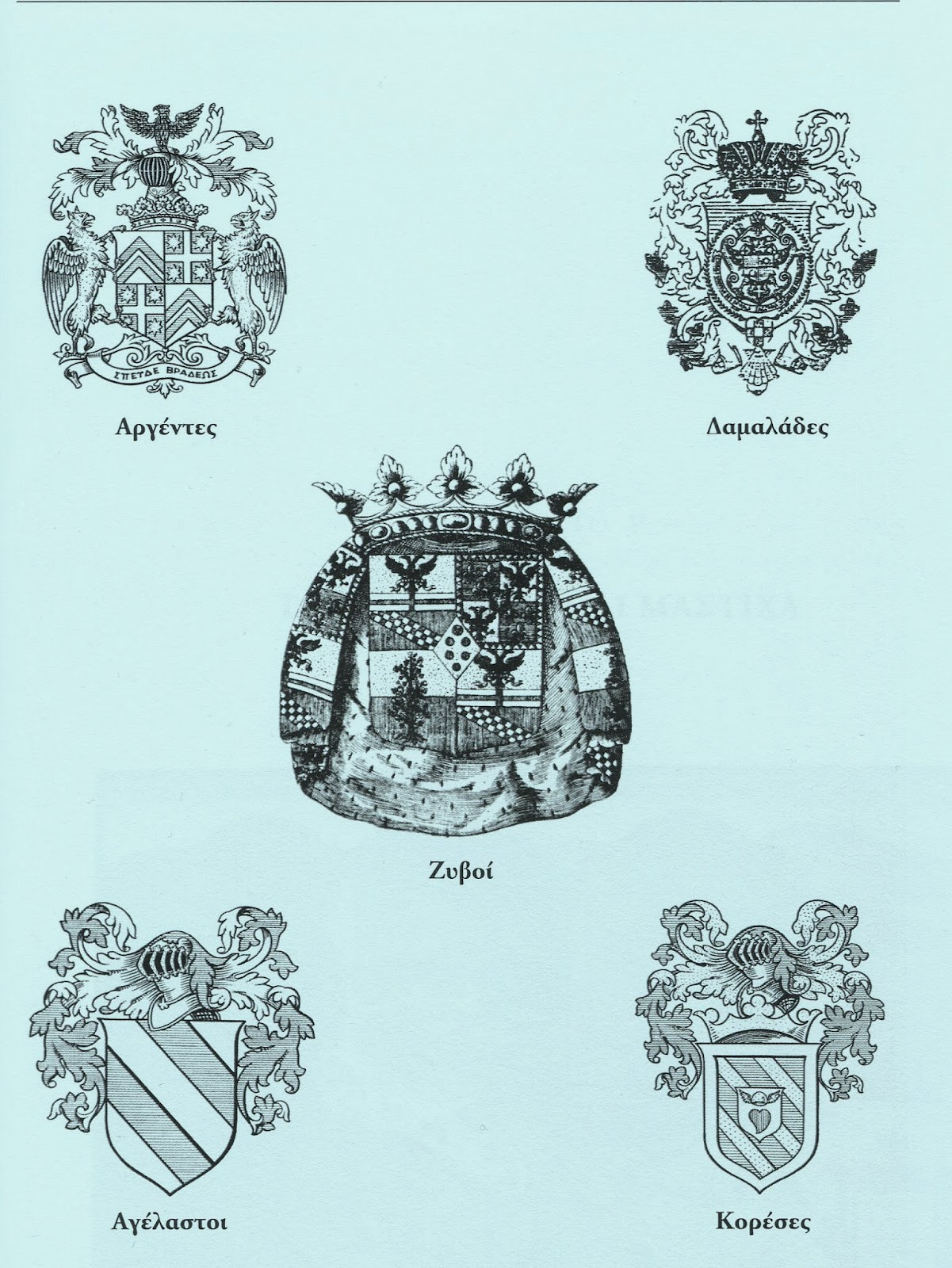
The quintet of Genoese noble families that governed Chios on behalf of the Byzantines during the 1329–1346 repossession.

Imperial rule in Chios was brief, and in 1346, a chartered company controlled by the Giustiniani called "Maona di Chio e di Focea" was set up in Genoa to reconquer and exploit Chios and the neighboring cities New and Old Phocaea in Asia Minor. Although the inhabitants firmly rejected an initial offer of protection, the island was invaded by a Genoese fleet led by Admiral Simone Vignoso.

The Quintet Lords of the island did not wait for the arrival of the diplomats, sent by the Empress Anna to negotiate with those under Vignoso. They mounted a resistance to the siege but, after several months, were forced to surrender the island to prevent starvation due to a naval blockade.

Prior to the formalized surrender, historically referred to as the Treaty of Agios Nikolaos tou Molou, Centurione escaped with a few of his sailors and headed for friendly territory in New Phocaea.

Upon the surrender of Chios on 12 September 1346, a treaty was signed by the governing quintet, minus Centurione, on behalf of the island. This included amnesty for Centurione, referred to as Damala, and the group of men who had sailed with him to New Phocaea. When Centurione did not return to Chios, Vignoso sailed to New Phocaea and secured its surrender on 20 September 1346. The treaty forbade the Zaccaria from residing, owning property, or interfering in the governance of both Phocaeas, putting a definitive end to their influence there.

The "protocomes Damalla" (Note: In the treaty, the additional "L" in the Damala is attributed to the fact that this individual is considered a fellow Italian by the Genoese conquerors. (Missailidis, 2012, p. 50)) and an Argenti signed the treaty of New Phocaea as the Genoese with interests in the city before the invasion. Like the first, the second treaty did not explicitly prohibit the Zaccaria from remaining in Chios. While it is certain that Centurione and his immediate family left the island at this time, some members evidently stayed behind, as a "Jane Zaccaria" is recorded as a witness to a property sale on 14 June 1348.

From then, Centurione lived both in his Barony of Damalà and Galata, where he signed in 1352 as a witness, "the first among the Latins," to the treaty with Emperor John VI Kantakouzenos. Displaced from the Aegean, the dynasty's political center of gravity shifted permanently to their mainland possessions in the Peloponnese.

== The Principality of Achaea (1346–1469) ==
=== As barons and bailiffs ===
Centurione and his descendants ruled his father's possessions in the Morea after their expulsion from Chios, with Centurione himself ruling the principality as bailiff in the name of successive absent princes who had never visited their Achaean domain, from 1364 until his death in the late 1380s. The Barony of Damalà was lost to the Byzantines around this time, as his eldest son and grandson are only mentioned with it in a titular fashion.

His eldest son was Andronikos Asano de Damala, or Zaccaria de Damalà, but there are less sources for his three younger sons: Filippo, Manuele and Martino. It is possible that Martino could have been the same person as Manuele as he does not appear in most genealogical records; he is known only from his participation in the Battle of Gardiki in 1375. Filippo and Manuele are documented through their marriages to prominent women of the time, where Filippo married the heiress of Rhiolo in Achaea, and Manuele to Eliana Cattaneo.

Andronikos acted as bailiff of Achaea for a short time, when Centurione travelled to Naples to the court of Queen Joanna I. After 1386, he inherited the Barony of Chalandritsa and the title of the Grand Constable of Achaea, becoming one of the most powerful men inside the Principality. He was wed to Catherine Le Maure, the eldest daughter of Erard III Le Maure, and heiress to the great Barony of Arcadia and Saint-Sauveur. Through this marriage the Zaccaria added the Le Maure inheritance to their domains.

Andronikos had four children: Centurione II, Stephen, Erard IV and Benedict. Centurione being the eldest, inherited his father's titles upon his death in 1401. Stephen was later appointed by Centurione as Latin Archbishop of Patras, a clerical position that he would hold until his demise in 1424. Erard inherited the maternal Barony of Arcadia, but seems to have died before 1404 as Centurione succeeded him as baron by then. Benedict is recorded as being alive in 1418, at Glarentza, when the forces of Olivier Franco besieged the city where Benedict was imprisoned.

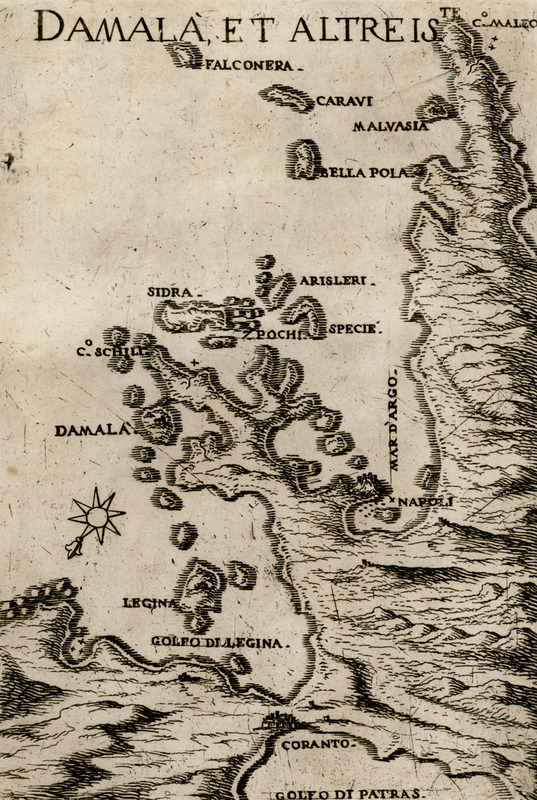
Map of Damala in the Morea, Boschini Marco, 1658.

Maria, sister to Andronikos and only daughter of Centurione I, married Pedro de San Superano, leader of the Navarrese Company beginning in 1386.

=== As sovereign Princes ===
In 1396, King Ladislas of Naples sold the rights to the Principality of Achaea to Pedro, who was already acting as the de facto Prince. This ended the principality's formal vassalage to the Angevins. Ultimately, Pedro did not have the funds to pay Ladislas, and after his death in November 1402, his wife ruled Achaea on behalf of her underage son as reigning princess as Maria II until 1404. It was in that year that her nephew, Centurione II Zaccaria, eldest son of her brother Andronikos, won a family inheritance dispute since she also could not fulfill the original terms of the sale. Ladislas agreed to sell the rights to Centurione, who promptly paid the owed sum to become the first truly sovereign Prince of Achaea, as per the original terms of the sale. On 20 April 1404, Centurione, who was already bailiff to his aunt, received Achaea as a hereditary principality and ascended its throne as its sovereign.

Centurione married an unknown lady of the Asen branch of the Palaiologos family, recorded in the Chronicle of the Tocco as "the princess" on more than one occasion. From this union, Centurione had at least four children: John Asen (Giovanni) Zaccaria, Catherine Zaccaria, Martino Zaccaria and another daughter whose name remains lost to history, that he offered as a bride to the adventurer Oliver Franco in 1418, after he seized the great port-city of Glarentsa.

In 1429, Prince Centurione and his son John were besieged inside the castle of Chalandritsa by the forces of Thomas Palaiologos. John dispatched a messenger with the name John Balotas to Constantine Palaiologos (later the last emperor of the Eastern Roman Empire) to declare that the Zaccaria preferred to surrender Chalandritsa to Theodora Tocco instead of Thomas. Theodora was the wife of Constantine, and sister of John's spouse Magdalene Tocco. Constantine refused the offer stating that this could result in unnecessary fighting between the Palaiologoi brothers. After resisting the siege up until then, he surrendered in late 1429.

Thomas forced him to a treaty whereby his daughter, Catherine, would marry the despot and thus make him Centurione's heir in Achaea, bypassing his son. During the negotiations, Centurione ensured that his original heir, John, would retain his princely title after his death, even only by name. It was agreed that Centurione was allowed to keep his princely title and his inheritance, the barony of Arcadia. He then retired to Arcadia in 1430 after the marriage was finalized early that year. He died there two years later in 1432, still hoping in vain for Genoese aid. After his death, his domains passed to Catherine, and therefore to the despotate of Morea and into Byzantine hands. Meanwhile, Centurione's wife was imprisoned at Chlemoutsi castle, where she spent the rest of her days.

=== Revival of the Principality (1453–1455) ===
Sometime around 1446, his eldest son John Asen Zaccaria rose against his brother-in-law and despot Thomas Palaiologos, along with the Albanian chief Bochalis Leontaris, in a time when the Albanian influence in Morea grew quite formidable. Upon his uprising, he was proclaimed Prince of Achaea for the first time by Greek magnates.

Within a year, John was defeated by the combined forces of then despots Constantine and Thomas Palaiologos. He was subsequently imprisoned with his eldest son and wife Magdalene Tocco by Thomas in Chlemoutsi castle, just as his mother had been, and left these remnants of the previous dynasty to waste away.

Neither John nor his son died there as anticipated, and instead, in 1453 convinced their guard to release them during a widespread revolt against the Despots. To secure his release, he married his daughter to the lord of Chlemoutsi, although the name of this Zaccaria princess does not survive. John then took the city of Aetos as his seat, which had hoisted the Zaccaria banners, and adopted the double-headed eagle as his emblem. He was congratulated and recognized by many Western rulers, namely Pope Nicholas V, Venetian Doge Francesco Foscari, and King Alfonso V of Naples.

The borders of the Morea around 1450

In correspondence preserved from 1454 and 1455, the Neapolitan chancery formally addressed him as "Prince Centurione III" (Centurioni Assani Zacharie et Achaie principi) and his wife as "Princess," while declaring Alfonso's readiness to "defend [his] state" (ad tutandum statum vestrum)—a phrase indicating that the restored principality was viewed as a functioning political entity. The revived state further established itself through diplomatic channels mediated by John's brother-in-law Leonardo III Tocco, Despot of Epirus, confirmed by royal letters dated as late as April 1455. The confirmation of his princely title by Naples was a gesture of great significance since the Kingdom of Naples had been the feudal overlord of the Principality of Achaea since 1267, by the Treaty of Viterbo between Charles I of Anjou and William II of Villehardouin until the acquisition of the principality by his father in 1404.

John gained the support of many Latins, Greeks and Albanians and besieged Thomas inside the city of Patras. His campaign was initially successful, until Turkish troops came to the aid of Thomas by his request as an Ottoman vassal. John was then defeated by the Ottomans under Turahan Bey, after a rule of roughly two years.

=== Exile ===
John escaped capture with his son and found refuge with the Venetians in Methoni, where he remained for a few years. In 1456, he retired under King Alfonso of Naples. In 1457, the Venetian Republic, recognising his high political value as titular Prince of Morea, also granted him an annuity, on the condition John would continue to reside in Modon or wherever else he could be most useful to the designs of Venice.

In 1459, he lost this Venetian annuity when he relocated to their enemy and his ancestral home of Genoa. There, the Doge wrote him a letter of recommendation to Pope Pius II for support. There he received his acknowledgement as the Prince of Achaea in exile by the Republic, where he endowed a precious reliquary of his family, the so-called Zaccaria Cross that is said to contain pieces of the True Cross belonging to St John the Evangelist. This reliquary remains in the treasury of Metropolitan Cathedral of Saint Lawrence to this day, and is considered one of Genoa's most important relics.

On 21 April 1461 the pope received an additional letter from the Duke of Milan, Francesco I Sforza, who also recommended that John should receive support,“considering the great disturbances and adversities which he had suffered from both the Turks and from the Greeks.”

In September 1461, John moved to Rome where he was welcomed to the papal court of Pope Paul II, who granted him a monthly pension of twenty florins as Prince of Achaea until his death in 1469.

== Dynastic survival and return to Chios (1469–1566) ==
=== Succession and the name Damalà ===
The precise descent and change from Zaccaria to strictly Damalà comes from the line of John's eldest son, Antonio. By the time of John's imprisonment only five members of the family remained: himself, his two sons and daughter, and his sister Catherine. His eldest son Antonio was imprisoned with him in Chlemoutsi Castle until 1453, while his younger son Angelo is first seen passing through Genoa in 1448 and paid tribute as the grandson of Prince Centurione II by the Doge and nobility. He is later seen in Galata before and during the siege of Constantinople in 1453.

There is no record of Angelo having progeny; however, his elder brother Antonio had a son named Pietro Antonio that is recorded with his father regarding the Church of SS Peter and Paul in Galata, which was on land that the family owned. Pietro's line died out within two subsequent generations while the line of Pietro's brother Giovanni—named after his grandfather—is the line that continues to this day.

The definitive transition to simply "Damalà", is recorded in the 16th century when his son Antonio Damalà (1498–1578) is given a fief by the Duke of Naxos, John IV Crispo; this was the establishment of a feudal relationship between the two, and to this day the village is named Damala. The father of Antonio is listed as a "Zaccaria de Damalà," now known to be Giovanni through Catholic baptismal records archived on the island of Tinos regarding his grandchildren.

=== The Sechiari hypothesis ===
While the lineage descending from Antonio perpetuated the dynastic heritage under the feudal name of Damalà, historians have also investigated the fate of the original Zaccaria surname and its possible survival through other families of Chios. The historian and genealogist Philip P. Argenti hypothesized that the Sechiari family may be directly descended from the Zaccaria dynasty.

According to Argenti, the surname Sechiari is likely the result of a linguistic and administrative alteration. He argued that the name underwent a phonetic transcription into Turkish during the Ottoman administration, gradually evolving into its current form. Argenti detailed this theory by stating:

It may well be, moreover, that the surname Sechiari is only a deformation of the true disappeared name. This would perhaps be, as several genealogists who, like us, study the origin of Greek noble families believe, the Turkish transcription of the name Zaccaria, of which we find no trace in Greece from the 19th century onwards. (Note: Original French: « Il se pourrait bien, du reste, que le nom de famille Sechiari ne fût qu'une déformation du vrai nom disparu. Celui-ci serait, peut-être, comme le pensent plusieurs généalogistes qui, comme nous, s'occupent de l'origine des familles nobles grecques, la transcription en turc du nom de Zaccaria, dont nous ne trouvons plus trace en Grèce à partir du XIXe siècle. »)

If this thesis—supported by several specialists in the Greek aristocracy—is accurate, the members of the Sechiari family would share the same sovereign ancestry as the Damalas, descending directly from the monarchs who held the titles of Lords of Chios, Princes of Achaea, or Kings and Despots of Asia Minor, depending on who precisely they would descend from. This parallel evolution illustrates how the identity of the Latin nobility adapted under Ottoman administration: one branch retaining a territorial title, while another saw its original patronymic mutate over the centuries.

=== Relations with the Duchy of Naxos ===
Antonio played an important role in delaying the conquest of Naxos by the Turks. Giacomo IV Crispo, whom succeeded his father John after his death, sent Antonio to Constantinople in 1564 as ambassador to ask for the Sultan's mercy in order to recognize him. This is something Antonio seems to have achieved, as the relevant firman was issued on 29 April 1565.

When in Constantinople, Antonio had befriended the Sultan's son-in-law, Grand Admiral Piali Pasha, and for this reason, when Piali Pasha occupied Chios in 1566, he invited him to settle there, giving him the ancestral estates that the Genoese Maona had taken from the Zaccaria centuries before.

Upon arriving in Chios, Antonio took over lands in Volissos, Kardamyla, Delfini, Lagkada, Kalamoti, Campos and the Dafnonas tower. After 1566, Antonio lived in the tower, and also owned the Stratigato and the Damalà estates, whose churches, Panagia Coronata and Sotira, he renovated. These two churches, along with their old fortified towers located at the "Stratigato" and "Damaladika" sites, were severely damaged during the 1822 massacre of Chios and ultimately fell during the earthquake of 1881. However, to this day there is an area of Dafnonas called "τού Δαμαλά" ("belonging to Damalà") where the Stratigato estate is still located. The location of the estate in Dafnonas, which is considered to be the family's oldest on the island, was known to be a seat of the Genoese aristocracy of Chios.

Starting with the children of Antonio, the family begins to appear in the Catholic vital records of Chios, all bearing distinctive Italian forenames and the "Damalà" surname. (Note: Historian George Zolotas explicitly distinguishes between two families bearing the name on Chios: a 'Greek house' of Byzantine origin, and a 'Frankish house' (φραγκικόν) related to the Zaccaria lords of Chios (συγγενεύοντα πρός Ζαχαρίας της Χίου). This distinction is observable in the island's vital records, where the Frankish line appears with exclusively Catholic affiliation and Italian forenames (e.g., Francesco, Antonio) prior to the 19th century, distinct from the Orthodox Greek family. The Frankish line's descent from the Zaccaria Barons of Damala is also attested by the Libro d'Oro of Chios, Professor Dionysios Zakythinos, and the Annuario della Nobiltà Italiana.)

== Under Ottoman and Venetian rule (1566–1822) ==
=== Nobles of Chios ===
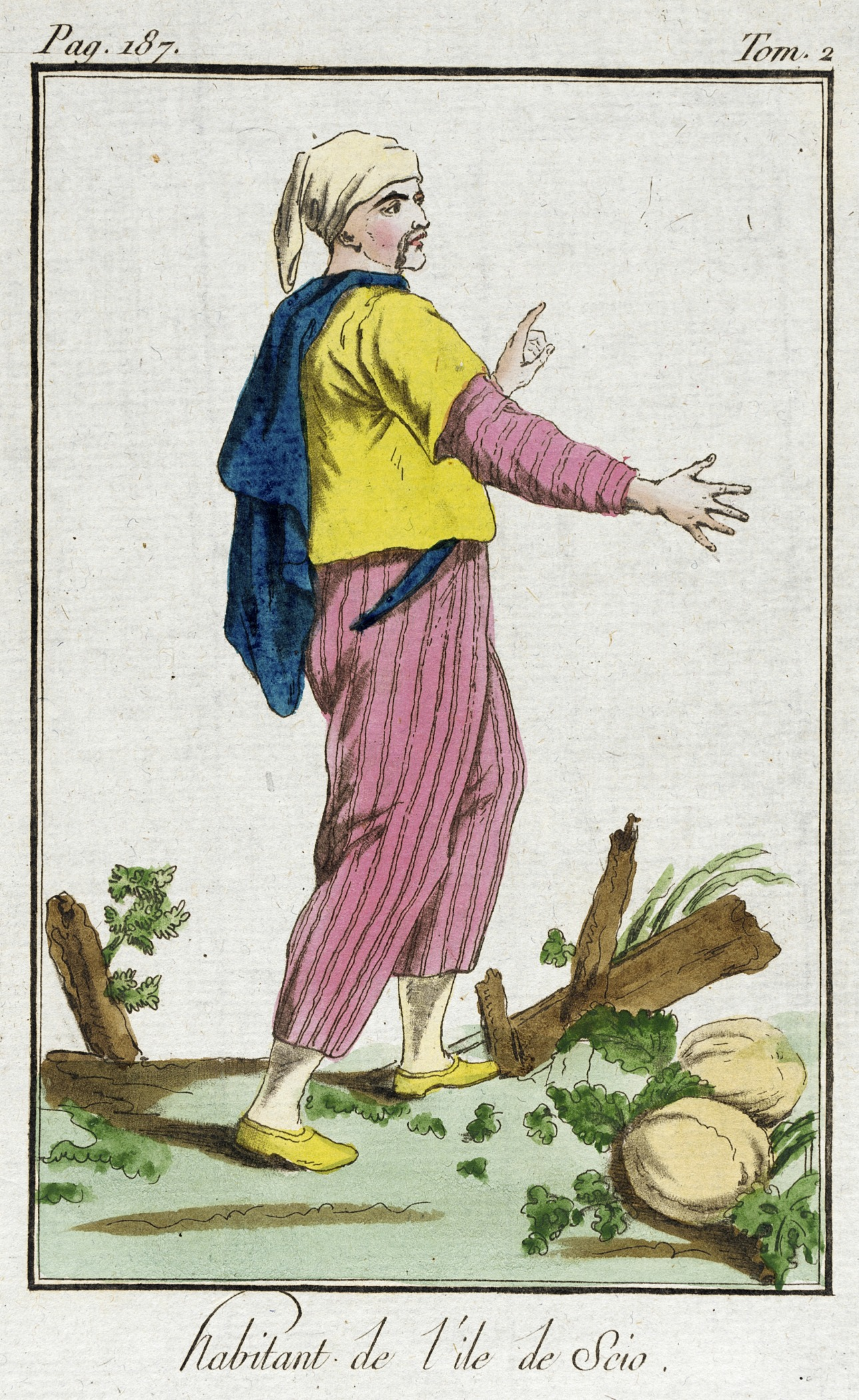
A nobleman in Chios c. 1700

Upon the family's reestablishment on the island following the Ottoman conquest of 1566, they were integrated into the Nobility of Chios, a hereditary aristocratic class that functioned as a distinct corporate entity under Ottoman rule. 20th-century historian Mihail Sturdza classified the Damalà among the "Latin Bourgeoisie" due to their exclusion from the defunct Giustiniani administration of the Genoese Maona, though this terminology referred to their political status outside the corporation rather than their social standing. This was not a middle class, but rather formed the island's distinct Latin Nobility, ranking as the second of six levels in the social class system, below the former Maona shareholders (first level) but socially superior to the local Greek nobles (third level). The family's descent and recovered fortunes allowed this first generation on Chios to intermarry immediately with the recently deposed Giustiniani dynasty, adhering to the strict endogamy that characterized this hyper-exclusive caste and ensured its preservation.

This unique social position was reinforced by the Chiot custom of the "Nobility of the Ledger." Unlike in Western Europe, where trade could strip a noble of their privileges (derogation), the Chiot aristocracy viewed commerce as a noble duty. This allowed families like the Damalà to accumulate capital through trade while retaining their feudal status, eventually being codified as one of the thirty-seven families of the Libro d'Oro.

As members of this corporate nobility, the family operated within a "State within a State" that persisted under the Turks due to the special privileges that Chios enjoyed in the empire. They possessed exclusive feudal privileges that were legally recognized by the Ottoman authorities. Most notably, they held their estates and fortified towers (Pyrgoi) in Fee Simple (absolute freehold); a rare deviation from Islamic land law that protected their property from arbitrary confiscation. Political authority was exercised through the Demogerontia, a ruling council elected exclusively from the Libro d’Oro families which held the powers of High Justice and Fiscal Sovereignty, collecting imperial taxes directly and barring Ottoman tax farmers from the island.

Socially, this distinction was enforced through strict sumptuary laws and the retention of the "Right of the Sword"—the privilege to carry weapons in public, which was strictly forbidden to the subject population. They also enforced a state-sanctioned Heraldic Monopoly, where the usurpation of a coat of arms was a capital offense for which one "risked one's life." Nobles were addressed by the exclusive title "Misé" (a corruption of Messire) and possessed the unique right to wear yellow Morocco shoes, a yellow cape, and the Kalpak (a noble fur headdress), while the common population was restricted to dark colors.

Over time, however, the internal hierarchy of the nobility shifted. While executive authority resided in the Demogerontia, Ottoman courts increasingly favored Orthodox Greek nobles over Latin Catholics in legal disputes. This political pressure gradually eroded the dominance of the Latin element in favor of the Orthodox Archons by the 18th century. The Libro d’Oro of Chios reflects this later period of Greek preference.

=== Nobles of Venice and Ottoman reprisals ===
By 1686, the Damalà were recorded as one of the remaining Latin noble families of Genoese origin by Giovanni Battista de Burgo in his visit to the island in that year. It was in this period that the family leveraged these roots to find themselves in positions of power within the Venetian Republic and its sphere of influence. Gregorio Damalà was appointed as Consul of Venetian Greece and Louca Damalà was made "Master Voivode" and Judge of Mykonos. The latter was an autonomous ruler agreed upon by both the Venetians and Ottomans during their pause in hostilities in the region.

The Venetians briefly occupied Chios from 1694 to 1695, but the family's rank as Venetian nobles was ultimately a detriment to their position when the occupation ended.

During this Venetian interlude, Sultan Ahmed had ordered that the Catholics were to be put to the sword, and so when the Venetians were preparing to abandon the island, 60 Latin families who were “full of wealth” took what they were able to and departed with them to Nafplio in the Morea; still under Venetian rule. The family head, Costantino Damalà (b. 1649), and his three children, are listed amongst those that left Chios seeking refuge. Unbeknownst to those that fled though, the sultan had died, and his successor had rescinded the order to execute any Latins that were found. Had this been known, they would not have been forced to flee, ”bound by faith and honour.”

While the lives of the remaining members on Chios were spared, the persecution of those of the Catholic faith greatly increased. The Turks imposed heavy taxes, confiscated the estates of the fugitives and threw into chains three men from each important family, considering them accomplices or followers of the Venetians. They deprived the remaining Giustiniani of their privileges, turned the churches into mosques and forbade Latin-rite worship. This forced the Catholics on Chios to attend church only in the chapel of the French consulate, which the Ottomans were unable to close.

In the late 18th century, Giovanni Damalà (1740–1812), grandson of Costantino, is seen living in the old Genoese colony of Galata with his family. He is mentioned during several events of the 1790s as a Genoese notable (noble) from Chios, who was also one of the four deputies, along with Giuseppe Varthaliti, Marco Xantachy, and Giuseppe Vitali, that represented the Magnifica Comunita di Pera.

== The Chios massacre and Hellenization (1822) ==
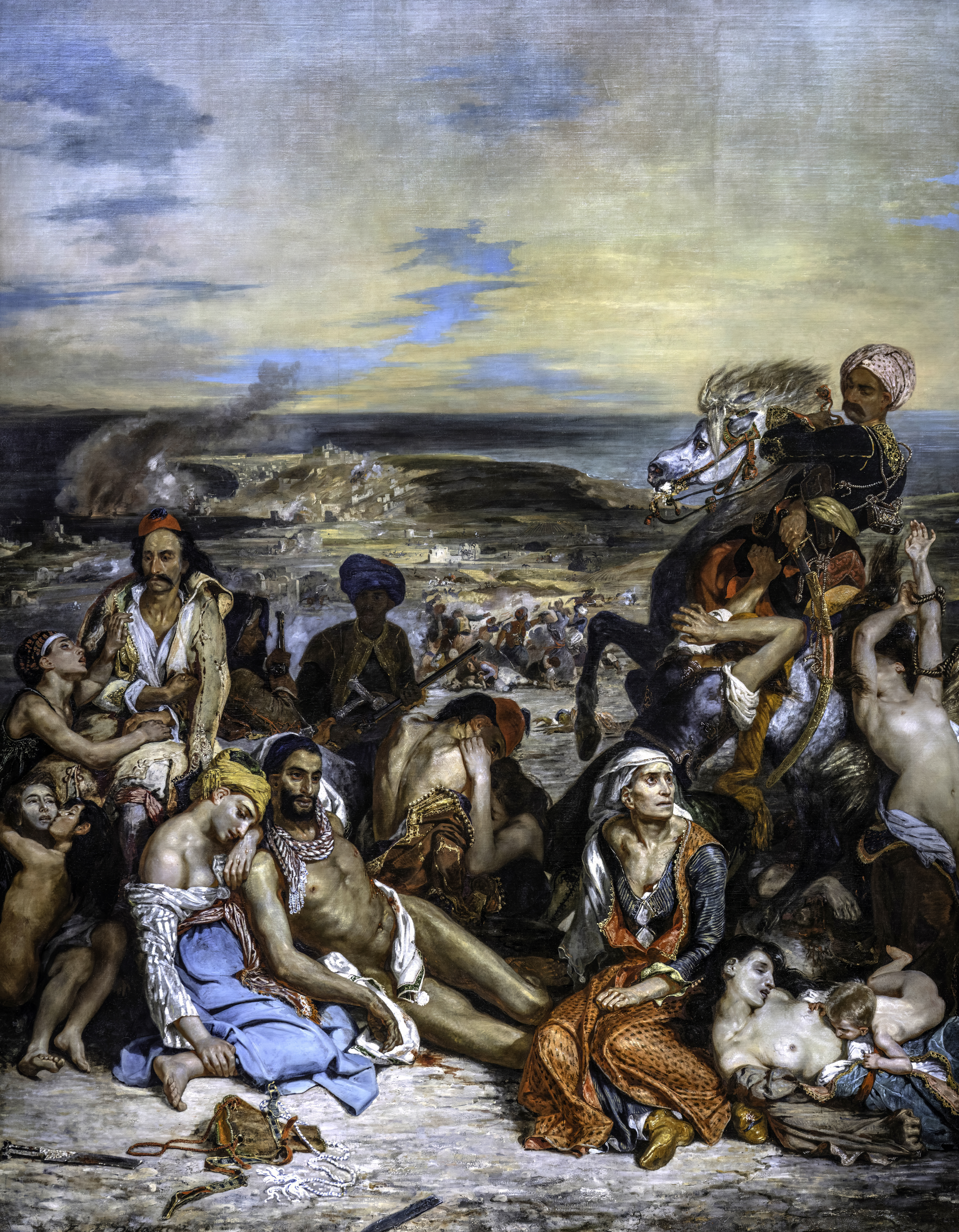
The Massacre at Chios by Eugène Delacroix. This, and the works of Lord Byron, did much to draw the attention of mainland Europe to the catastrophe that had taken place in Chios (1824, oil on canvas, 419 cm × 354 cm (165 in × 139 in), Musée du Louvre, Paris).

By the 19th century, the family was considered one of the most important Latin families of the Aegean. They are seen with numerous estates in the aristocratic Campos area of Chios, known for its stone mansions with citrus orchards. The bulk of these estates were in the "Frankish Mountain" (Φραγκοβούνι) district, in the southeast portion of Campos. During the Turkish occupation, the consulates of European countries were located in the area and many Catholics lived there.

In 1822, the catastrophe known as the Chios massacre took place on the island, which saw the Damalà abruptly lose their privileged social position held since they returned to the island. Members that were able to escape capture fled along with the other noble families. The appointed governor of the island at this time was Ioannis Zanni Damalà, son of the deputy Giovanni in Galata. He along with the heads of several other noble families of Chios were executed in the city, and irreparable damage was done to their estates.

Beginning with Ioannis Zanni, the family began intermarrying with the Greek nobles that had been on the rise. The name was completely Hellenized to "Δαμαλάς" (Damalas) after 1822, when the Ottomans made the worship of the Catholic faith forbidden for a second time. This transition is observed in the names of the family around the massacre, which was a watershed moment for the island that solidified the Ottoman preference of Orthodox Greeks over other groups in Chios.

== Prominence in modern Greece and abroad (1830–present) ==
=== Political and social re-establishment ===
Over the following decades, the family reemerged as an influential force in the region, establishing themselves in Ermoupoli on the island of Syros, a place where other Chiot nobles had fled to after 1822.

In the decades that followed the massacre, the Damalà and many of the other thirty-six noble houses rebuilt their fortunes through the so-called Chiot Clan, a closed transnational network that dominated Mediterranean and global trade throughout the nineteenth century. This circle of interrelated families was bound by kinship and partnership ties that underpinned its commercial success. In 1886, the Agelasto, Argenti, Damalà, Galati, Mavrogordato, Petrocochino, Rodocanachi, Scaramanga, Schilizzi, Sevastopoulo, Vlasto and Zizinia are listed among the membership of the Baltic Exchange, reflecting their integration into the international maritime economy.

Within this environment of revived Chiot prominence, Ambrosios Ioannou Damalas, eldest son of the slain Ioannis Zanni and head of the family, emerged as one of the leading economic and political figures of Syros. He acquired great wealth and played a central role in the founding of the Hellenic Steamship Company. He further cemented his position within the "Chiot Clan" network by marrying Calliopi Ralli, daughter of Loukas Rallis (the first mayor of Piraeus) and Despoina Rodocanachi. His economic influence extended internationally, eventually leading the National Bank of Greece to entrust him with the representation of its interests in France. In the cosmopolitan Vaporia district by the port of Ermoupoli, he had built an extremely ornate palace in the neoclassical style, rich with frescoes by Italian artist Giuseppe Tami. Some of the land of this estate was ceded for the expansion of Othonos Square, and it was there that the family was recognized by the first King of modern Greece, as King Otto I and Queen Amalia were hosted at the palace; first in 1846 and again in 1850.

The municipality's formal designation of the Damalas estate as the royal residence is recorded by primary archives and the contemporary 1846 Aiolos newspaper, which documented the monarchs' stay Notably, the 1850 royal visit coincided with King Otto's 35th birthday (May 20, Julian calendar), during which he was a guest of the family.

Some time during this period, Ambrosios sold one of his father's remaining landed estates on Chios to his friend George Sourias. This is parcel 125 according to Arnold C. Smith's "Map of the Kampos."

Beginning in Ermoupoli, the family soon returned to their traditional role in statecraft, with Ambrosios serving two highly successful terms as mayor of Ermoupoli from 1853 to 1862. During the devastating 1854 cholera epidemic, while other officials fled, he remained to personally manage the city's institutions and protect the poor, for which King Otto awarded him the Gold Cross of the Order of the Redeemer. Later, during the 1862 anti-Othonian rebellion, although he was known for his staunch devotion to King Otto, Ambrosios strategically appeared to support the armed uprising, though he did this solely to maintain control, disarm the populace, and prevent a political rebellion from devolving into a social revolution that would destroy the city's prosperity. Despite his actual loyalty to the crown, his political enemies slandered him to the Othonian government, which subsequently dismissed him and the city council. In the new municipal elections of 1862, the citizens defiantly re-elected him for a third term; however, embittered by the government's disregard of his loyalty, and to spare the King the political crisis of having to bypass his election, Ambrosios declined the position. He permanently retired to Marseille, France, where he died in 1869.

In parallel, the family was represented at the highest levels of Greek academia and church affairs through the eldest nephew of Amborios, Nikolaos Damalas, a theologian and professor of New Testament Introduction and Exegesis at the University of Athens. Educated in Athens and then at Erlangen, Leipzig, and London (PhD, 1863), he taught from 1867 until his death, served four terms as dean of the Faculty of Theology, and was rector in 1878–79. He authored numerous theological works and treatises during his career, and also represented the Church of Greece at international conferences. As Royal Commissioner to the Holy Synod, he notably declined to sign the synodal decision in the contemporary “Simoniacal” controversy in 1876.

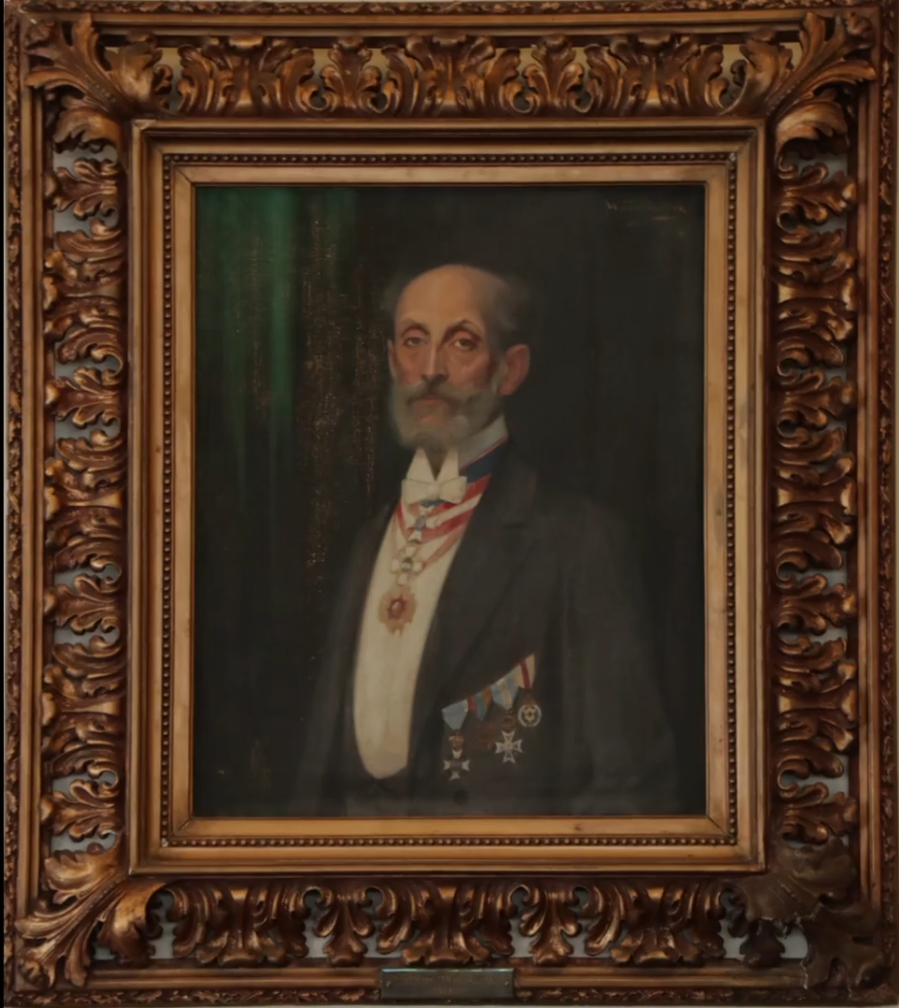
Portrait of Pavlos Damalà in white tie attire, found at the mayoral office of Piraeus, Greece.

While the eldest son of Ambrosios, Ioannis, served as mayor of Chios (1878–1882), it was his second son, Pavlos, that became more of a pivotal figure in both Greek politics and culture, in addition to serving as the last publicly active head of the family until his death on Christmas Day 1925.

As a cultural and athletic patron, he brought the first bicycles to Greece with King George I in 1869, and founded the Ereto Rowing Club in 1885 under royal charter. The club remains today the oldest sports institution in Greece and the Balkans, and has held an annual regatta in his name since 1886. Later he worked with Prince George of Greece and Denmark to organize the watersports events for the first modern Olympic Games in 1896.

His public career included his appointment in 1893 as Honorary Spanish Vice Consul of Athens-Piraeus. Around this time, he married the daughter of the 3rd Duke de Tascher de la Pagerie, uniting the Damalà family with one of France’s most recognized noble houses and a collateral line of Empress Josephine.

He eventually served as Mayor of Piraeus (1903–1907). During his mayoral run in 1903, Pavlos contested the results in a highly controversial election, which was initially marred by widespread fraud, violence, and impersonation. He appealed directly to Dimitrios Rallis and Crown Prince Constantine, while thousands of citizens marched to Athens in protest. The election was annulled by court order and reheld later that year, resulting in his victory. As mayor, he oversaw a number of civic improvements and promoted reconciliation, despite facing opposition from a divided city council. In recognition of his public service, he was appointed Commander of the British Royal Victorian Order during Edward VII’s 1906 visit to Greece.

=== Cultural figures ===
During this period, the family also produced an infamous figure, Aristidis Iakovos Damalà, known in France as Jacques Damala. He was the third son of Ambrosios, educated at the Imperial Russian Page Corps in Saint Petersburg; a military academy restricted—except by personal appointment of the Emperor—to the sons of high hereditary nobility of Russian lands, and the sons of high-ranking generals. He later served as a military attaché in the Greek diplomatic corps, when he was introduced to the legendary Sarah Bernhardt in Paris shortly before mid-1881, where they formed a romantic connection. He was posted to Saint Petersburg soon after, where Bernhardt later performed in hopes of seeing him. This tour resulted in the furthering of their relationship, to the point where Aristidis left diplomacy to follow her to London, and married her in June 1882.

During their tumultuous marriage, Bernhardt visited the Damalas family mansion in Ermoupoli, where, in a moment of despair, she used her diamond ring to engrave a French proverb into the glass of a northeastern window: "Souvent femme varie bien fou qui s'y fie" (Often a woman changes, very foolish is he who trusts her).

Aristidis attempted an acting career alongside her in Paris, where he already held a distinct reputation for his striking appearance but also for his frequent affairs and opium use, something that led his career to falter, and he died in 1889 at age 34. Regarding Jacques, Bram Stoker, the author of the gothic horror classic Dracula, noted his striking and macabre appearance. In his 1906 memoir, Stoker recalled a dinner with the actor:

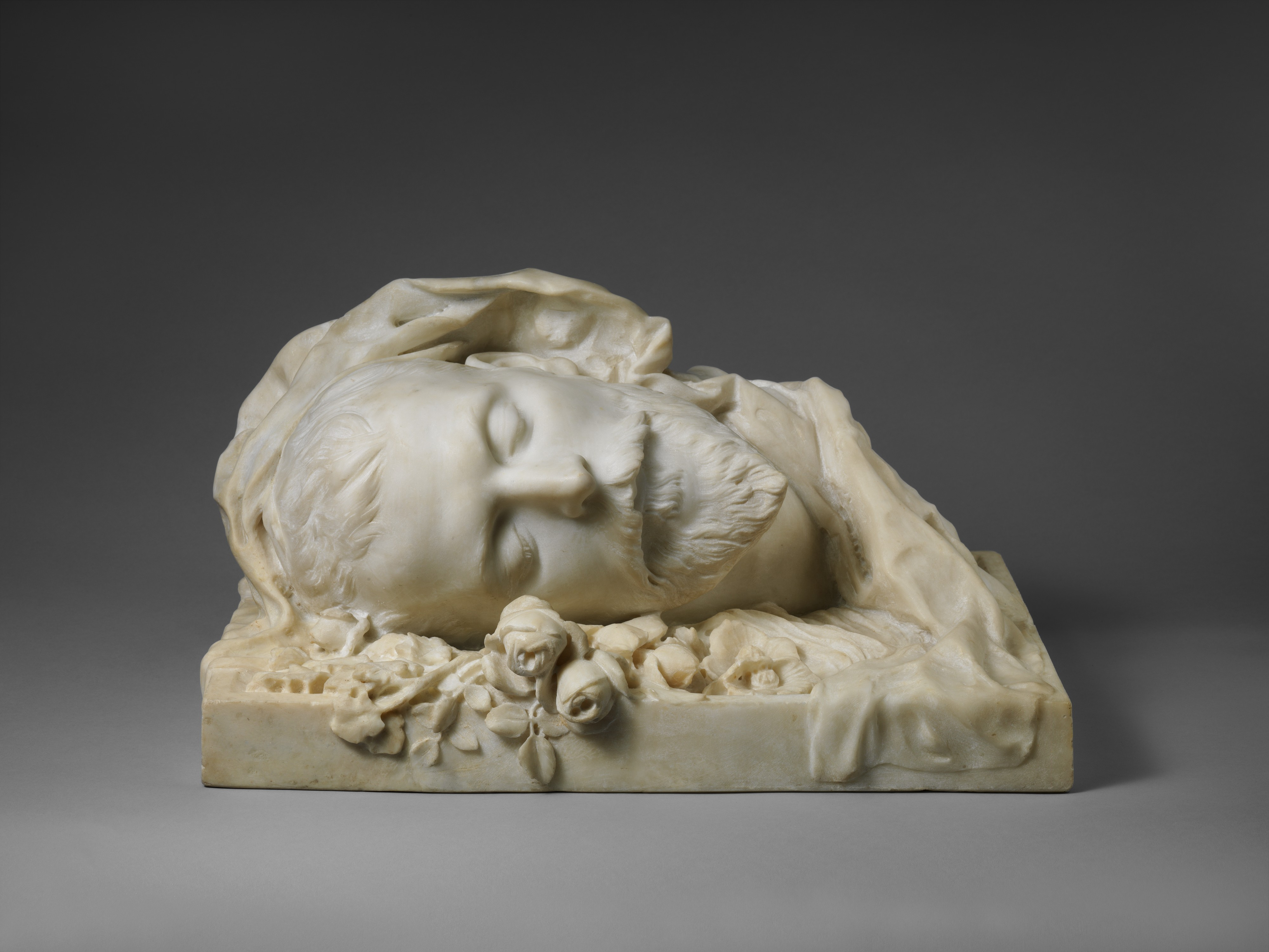
Funerary bust of Jacques Damala, by his widow Sarah Bernhnardt, 1889, now exposed in the New York MET Museum.

"I sat next to him at supper, and the idea that he was dead was strong on me. I think he had taken some mighty dose of opium, for he moved and spoke like a man in a dream. His eyes, staring out of his white, waxen face, seemed hardly the eyes of the living."

Modern literary scholars have highlighted this visceral description to connect Damala to the title character of Stoker's novel. David J. Skal names Damala as a "slightly better nominee" for Dracula's physical prototype than other historical candidates based on this corpse-like resemblance. Additionally, biographer Robert Gottlieb asserts that Stoker explicitly acknowledged Damala as an influence upon the novel's publication in 1897. After Jacques' death, Bernhardt wore mourning clothes for a year, as was the Catholic custom, and she never renounced his last name, which she had hyphenated with her own. For a while, she insisted on being called "the widow Damalà," and even sculpted a funerary bust of him which is now on display at the Metropolitan Museum of Art in New York City.

Jacques was a contemporary of fellow Greek Basil Zaharoff, the notorious "merchant of death" and one of the richest men in the world. Near Jacques' death, Zaharoff intervened to care for his illegitimate daughter with a theatre extra after she was left in a basket on Sarah Bernhardt's doorstep. Eventually, this girl was baptised "Tereza" (1889–1967) and was raised by a surrogate family that Zaharoff found for her in Adrianople, in East Thrace.

Her life was later the subject of the biography Tereza (1997) by journalist Freddy Germanos. While the work utilizes a dramatized narrative structure, it incorporates a non-fictional postscript and independent transcribed testimonies to establish the historical facts of her life.

In the 1910s, she became a socialite in Athenian royal society. She moved within King Constantine I’s entourage during his exile, having married a member of the royal inner circle. Spyridon Mercouris attested to meeting her while they were both in exile on Corsica. She was closely associated with Gabriele d’Annunzio, and in Italian circles she was known as “Tereza d’Annunzio.” Notably, D’Annunzio himself celebrated her ancestor, Martino Zaccaria, in his long poem Song of the Dardanelles:

“In royal power Asia Minor has Martino Zaccaria, he mints coins, raises armies and ships, works in Focea for alum, in Chios for silk, rages in trade and reprisals, exterminates Catalans and Muslims, fully armed as a King he dies in battle.”

Tereza was also remembered by contemporaries as a romantic interest of Ernest Hemingway. Mary Welsh Hemingway, poet Archibald MacLeish, and Canadian journalist Kenneth MacTaggart each provided testimonies confirming the “Greek princess” that Ernest loved, while Henry Serrano Villard likewise remembered Hemingway referring to “the Greek woman” when they were hospitalized together in Milan.

Posthumous accounts also record a traumatizing encounter between Tereza and Mustafa Kemal Atatürk and state that she served as a model for Pablo Picasso in the early 1920s. Her story remained largely absent from Greek historical records by design, likened to Penelope Delta in terms of being a real figure whose private passions were deliberately kept from public documents. Her life is considered a “recovered memory,” pieced together from testimonies by Hemingway’s associates, Greek political figures, and cultural figures such as Sophia Laskaridou and Melina Mercouri. In 2023, her life was the subject of the theatrical production Tereza Damala, staged by the Group Thea-try in Oropos.

=== Business, diaspora, and modern legacy ===
The wider family's prominence was also evident through Ambrosios's youngest brother, Iakovos, distinguished historically as a Chiot Megalemporos—a specific socioeconomic classification denoting the elite class of transnational merchant-bankers and shipping magnates who financed and directed the 19th-century diaspora network. He was officially selected from Ermoupoli's elite to receive King Otto during his disembarkment during the 1842 royal visit, and his own mansion was cited as a royal residence.

By the turn of the century, Iakovos' son, Ioannis Damalas (b. 1835), a first cousin of Pavlos, had secured his branch’s place as a notable banking family in Constantinople. He was also a representative member of the thirteen families that formally reconstituted the nobility of Chios in 1859, when the island remained under Ottoman rule.

Ioannis and his son Iakovos (b. 1868) played a significant role for many years in the economic life of Turkey, and influencing the communal affairs of the Greeks its capital. Iakovos in particular, became the director of operations in India for the Ralli Brothers Company before establishing himself as a prominent banker. He also established a connection with the Greek royal court when he married Helena Lüders, eldest daughter of Otto Lüders, Lord Chamberlain to King George I of Greece and tutor of the future King Constantine I of Greece.

The family also continued their philanthropic traditions back on their ancestral island of Chios, donating one of their remaining estates in the Kampos to the School of Chios in the early 20th century, which became part of the School Fund. Another of their former estates, which still contained the ruins of an old small tower, was eventually expropriated by the state to build the modern Chios Island National Airport.

In the mid-20th century, Constantine John Damalas continued the family's mercantile leadership in the closed Chiot Clan as a director of Ralli Brothers Ltd. He served on the firm's executive committee in London and India alongside members of the Ralli and Vlasto families into the 1950s. He was also a founding subscriber to the Indian subsidiary, Rallis India Limited, in 1948.

In 1946, he was awarded the Gold Cross of the Order of George I by King George II of Greece in recognition of his services during World War II. Permission to wear this decoration was formally granted by King George VI of the United Kingdom in July of that year. By 1954, he had relocated to the United States thereby establishing the senior line of the family in America.

From the early 1990s until 2024, Spyros Dimitrios "Jim" Damalas (1951–2024), established himself as a pioneering figure in sustainable tourism, known for his significant contributions to Costa Rica's eco-friendly hospitality industry. He founded Greentique Hotels and established the renowned Si Como No Resort, Spa, and Wildlife Refuge. His commitment to environmental conservation and community engagement earned him numerous accolades, including the Rainforest Alliance Sustainable Standard-Setters Award. Through his large presence in the conservation community, he made notable connections, such as his friendship with Jimmy Buffett, who wrote a chapter about meeting Damalas in his book "A Pirate Looks at Fifty."

The Damalas family has remained one of the most prominent in Chios, as attested by many historians, including Konstantinos Amantos and Nikos Perris. In 1982, the XV International Congress of Genealogical and Heraldic Sciences reaffirmed the family's classification as part of the "Noblesse de l'île de Chio" (Nobility of the Isle of Chios). The Congress defines this class as the island's "Frankish" (Latin) nobility, composed of Western families who remained on the island or were ennobled by the Genoese Maona. This classification explicitly distinguishes the Damalà from the "Greek Notables" (Familles notables grecques) of the mainland—such as the Kodjabashis and Souliotes—noting that the Chiot nobility belonged to an "aristocracy in the European sense" distinct from the indigenous gentry.

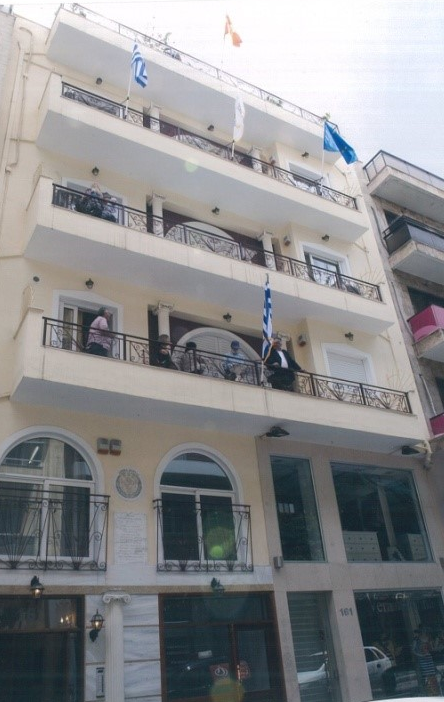
The Antonios Damalas Foundation building, Piraeus, Greece

In 2012, Anastasia Damala formed the philanthropic Antonios Damalas Foundation hosting seminars on the sciences, philosophy, current events and history. These events are held in a private building in Piraeus owned by the family, which houses conference halls, a library, a museum, and a chapel. The foundation also has operations in Chios, within one of their ancestral homes, directly across from the ruins of the Kamenos Pyrgos estate. Notably, this home is on land that has been held since their Zaccaria ancestors acquired it and constructed Kamenos Pyrgos.

In 2023, a genealogical study was undertaken on the agnatic descendants of Martino Zaccaria, Lord of Chios and Damalà, whose marriage to Jacqueline de la Roche founded the Zaccaria de Damalà branch in the Principality of Achaea.

In 2024, the family’s legal, dynastic and nobiliary background was examined in the book Achaean Disputes: Eight Centuries of Succession Conflicts for the Title of Prince of Achaea, a study authored by legal scholar Ugo Stornaiolo S.

According to Stornaiolo, based on the historical succession practices of the family, which follows the Salic law tradition, the seniormost male-line descendant of Martino is the family’s legitimate head, and based on the 2023 genealogical findings, he designates Constantine Zaccaria de Damalà (b. 1992) in this capacity.

=== Public return and heritage activities ===
Following a 2023 genealogical review that documented the survival of the senior line, the family formally re-established its presence in Greek civic and religious spheres in 2026. Represented by the current head of the lineage, Constantine Zaccaria de Damalà, this institutional return was marked by engagements renewing the dynasty's historical ties to the region. In Syros, a formal reception by the Municipality of Syros-Ermoupolis to establish philanthropic frameworks prompted local historians to verify the neoclassical Damalas Mansion as the authentic residence that hosted King Otto and Queen Amalia during their 19th-century state visits. In Piraeus, the family renewed its traditional patronages when the board of the Omilos Ereton—the Balkans' oldest sporting institution, founded by Pavlos Damalas in 1885—welcomed Constantine to accept dynastic endowments.

The family's dual religious heritage was subsequently commemorated in late June, when the municipality invited Constantine to participate in Ermoupoli's bicentennial celebrations. During this visit, the regional hierarchs of both churches held audiences to recognize the lineage. This included an audience with Metropolitan Dorotheos II of the Orthodox Church of Greece, which honored the legacy of Royal Commissioner Nikolaos Damalas, and a reception by the Roman Catholic Diocese of Syros. The Diocese formally celebrated the long preservation of the family's Latin-Genoese identity until the turn of the 19th century and reaffirmed its historical alliances with the Holy See, specifically citing the campaigns of King Martino Zaccaria and the papal protections extended to Prince Centurione III in exile.

== Church of the Holy Apostles ==
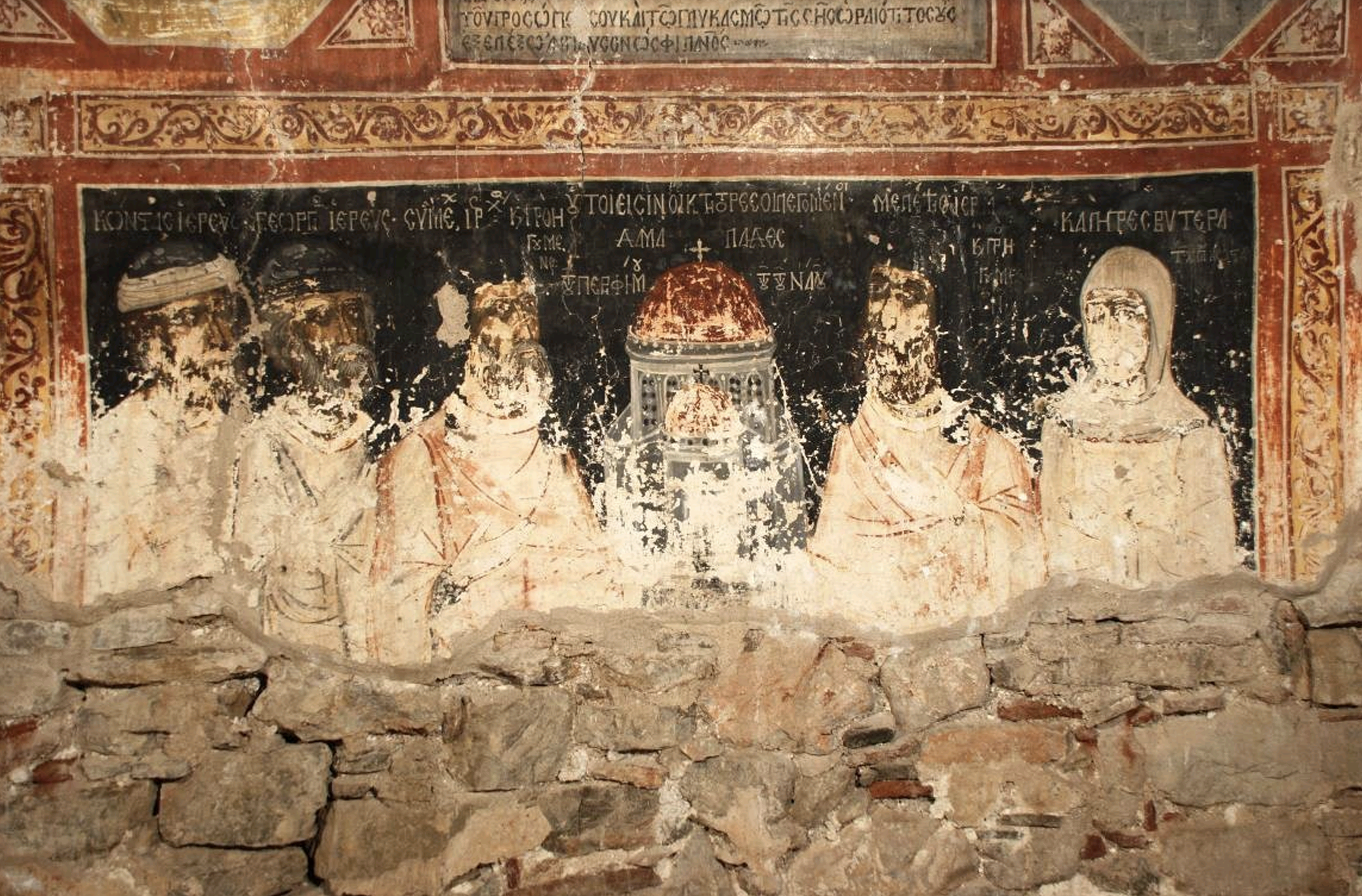
Fresco of the founders, 1665. Symeon Damalas and his family hold up an effigy of the Church. Above the church's dome "ΔΑΜΑ ΛΑΔΕC" is written in medieval Greek, translating to ΔΑΜΑΛΑΔΕΣ, (DAMALADES, Damalas, in plural) in modern Greek.

The Church of the Holy Apostles is a late Byzantine church located in Pyrgi, the largest medieval village of Chios. It is one of the best preserved examples of Byzantine architecture in Greece. The church originally existed as one of the private shrines of the Damalas family, from which it is believed Pyrgi was built around, as in the late Byzantine period, population centers began around churches with a tower and manor house. As such, the church is situated just northeast of the village's main square.

Holy Apostles is a small reproduction of the katholikon (main church) of Nea Moni, being richly decorated outside with brick patterns. The interior is completely covered with frescoes painted by Antonios Kenygos of Crete, in 1665.

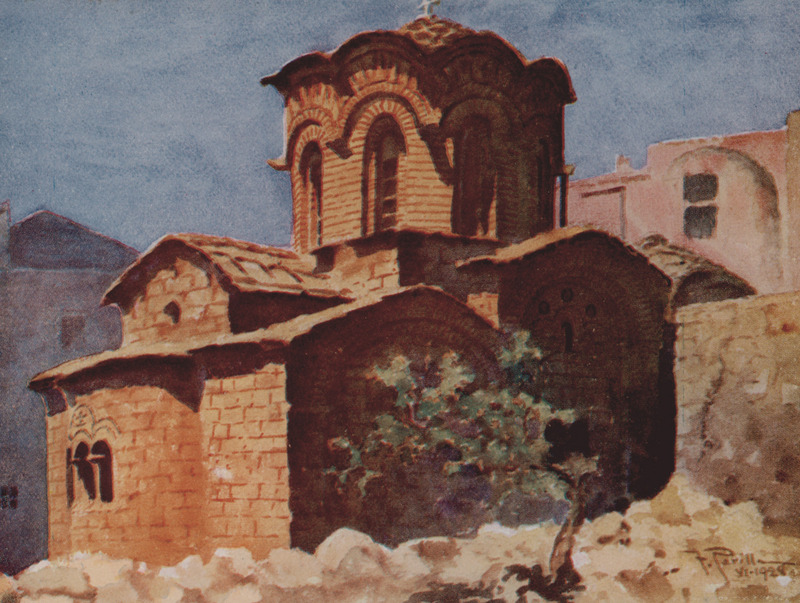
A 1928 watercolor painting of Holy Apostles by Francesco Perilla.

An inscription over the main entrance of the church tells us that monk Symeon of the Damalas family, who eventually became the metropolitan bishop of Chios, raised the church "from its foundations" in 1564. This most likely refers to an extensive renovation, since its architectural and morphological features indicate that it was constructed in the middle of the 14th century.

It is likely that the original church was destroyed in one of the great earthquakes of 1546, and 18 years later, the monk Symeon had found it in ruins. Under the property law at the time, it would have belonged to his family and would have been his obligation to rebuild it. Nonetheless, since only his monastic name is known, the exact family relation of this Symeon Damalas to the Zaccaria de Damalà family that was present in Chios during that time has remained obscure and unproven, aside from apocryphal family tradition.

The manor house and fortified tower that accompanied the church were destroyed like many structures in the 1881 Chios earthquake.

== Male-line descent ==
The following chart depicts the male-line descent of Martino, de jure King and Despot of Asia Minor, and subsequently of Centurione II, Prince of Achaea. A silver crown designates previous heads of the family, while a gold crown denotes the current head. (Note: In 1325, Martino Zaccaria received the royal title “King and Despot of Asia Minor” by imperial grant of Latin Emperor Philip II of Taranto, and in 1404, his descendant, Centurione II Zaccaria, acquired full sovereign rights to the Principality of Achaea. These royal and princely titles have at times been associated with the family's legitimate male-line descendants. Following the fall of Achaea, Centurione's son, John Asen Zaccaria, continued to be recognized in exile as Prince of Achaea by the Christian powers of the time, of which only the Holy See remains as a sovereign state today. The historical record indicates that the family retained formal privileged noble rank in the Aegean, particularly as members of the Nobility of Chios, where the aristocracy preserved distinct social and political privileges under Ottoman rule until the island's incorporation into the modern Kingdom of Greece in 1913. Since that time, while modern constitutions in Greece and the United States do not grant legal recognition to hereditary titles, the family's historical status has continued to be a point of study in nobiliary, heraldic, and academic contexts to the present day. In the modern era, the headship of the family has been formally received through distinct engagements with Greek municipal, athletic, Eastern Orthodox, and Roman Catholic institutions.)

Relevant male line descent
- Martino, de jure King and Despot of Asia Minor (c. 1291–1345)
  - Bartolomeo, Marquis of Bodonitsa (c. 1309–1334)
  - Centurione I, Bailiff of Achaea (c. 1318–1386)
    - Andronikos, Grand Constable of Achaea (c. 1357–1401)
      - Centurione II, Prince of Achaea (c. 1375–1432)
        - Centurione III, Prince of Achaea (c. 1406–1469)
          - Antonio (c. 1428–?)
            - Pietro Antonio (c. 1452–?)
              - Angelo (c. 1482–?)
            - Giovanni (c. 1458–?)
              - Antonio, Ambassador of the Duchy of Naxos to the Ottoman court (1498–1578)
                - Giovanni (c. 1559–c. 1608)
                  - Antonio (c. 1590–c. 1633)
                    - Giovanni (1615–?)
                      - Costantino (1649–c. 1712)
                        - Francesco (c. 1690–?)
                        - Baldassare (1705–c. 1759)
                          - Nicola (1736–1760)
                          - Giovanni, Deputy of the Magnifica Comunita di Pera (1740–1812)
                            - Nicola Isidoro (1766–c. 1768) (male line extinct 1768)
                            - Nicola (1768–?)
                            - Ioannis Zanni, Governor of Chios (c. 1778–1822)
                              - Ambrosios, Mayor of Ermoupoli (1808–1869)
                                - Ioannis, Mayor of Chios (1845–1916)
                                  - Ambrosios (1892–1913)
                                - Pavlos, Mayor of Piraeus, CVO (1853–1925)
                                  - Ambrosios (1898–1913)
                                - Aristidis Iakovos, aka Jacques Damala (1855–1889)
                              - Dimitrios (c. 1815–?)
                                - Nicholas, Royal Commissioner to the Holy Synod of the Church of Greece (1842–1892)
                                - Athanasios Dimitrios (c. 1852–?)
                                  - Ioannis Athanasios (1877–1947)
                                    - George John (1923–2015)
                                    - Constantine John (1923–2004)
                                      - John Constantine (1955–2007)
                                      - Stefanos Constantine (1959–)
                                        - Constantine Paul (1992–)
                                          - (living male issue)
                                  - Evangelos Athanasios (c. 1878–?)
                                  - Stefanos Athanasios (1884–1943)
                                    - Nasos Stefanos (1922–1923)
                                  - Apostolos Athanasios (c. 1889–?)
                                  - Harry Panagiotis (c. 1891–?)
                                  - Panagiotis Harry (1911–1994)
                                    - (living male issue)
                                    - Spyros "Jim" Dimitrios (1951–2024)
                                  - George Athanasios (1892–1959) (male line extinct late 20th cent.)
                                - Alexandros Dimitrios (c. 1854–?)
                                  - Antonios Alexandros (1874–?)
                                    - Dimitrios Alexandros (1906–1999)
                                      - Isidoros Dimitrios (c. 1924–?)
                                      - Antonios Dimitrios (1930–1989)
                                        - (living male issue)
                                    - Stylianos Alexandros (1912–1993) (male line extinct 1999)
                                    - Alexandros (1916–1985)
                                  - Petros Alexandros (1883–1943)
                                    - William Peter (1924–1998)
                                      - Anthony William (1945–2010)
                                        - (living male issue)
                                      - William Thomas (1947–2015)
                                        - (living male issue)
                                      - (living male issue)
                                  - Constantine Alexandros (1887–?)
                                    - Alexander Constantine (1919–?) (male line extinct 20th cent.)
                                  - Harry Alexandros (1888–1956)
                                    - Alex Harry (1938–1999)
                                      - (living male issue)
                                - Mikes Dimitrios (1855–1912) (male line extinct mid-20th cent.)
                                - Isidoros Dimitrios (c. 1856–?)
                              - Iakovos (c. 1817–?)
                                - Zanni Iakovo (1835–1898)
                                  - Jacques (1868–1937)
                                  - Alexandros (1869–?)
                                - George (1837–?)
                                - Dimitrios (1841–?)
                          - Costantino (1744–?)
                          - Severio (1746–?)
                      - Louca, Voivode of Mykonos (c. 1650–1688)
                      - Neophytos, Bishop of Thessaloniki (c. 1652–c. 1688)
                      - Mathon (c. 1653–c. 1688)
                    - Francesco (c. 1620–?) (male line extinct c. 1817)
                    - Nicola (c. 1626–?) (male line extinct 1711)
                    - Gregorio, Consul of Venetian Greece (c. 1632–c. 1675)
                      - Antonio (c. 1669–?)
                - Costantino (1590–?) (male line extinct 17th cent.)
                - Nicoli (c. 1610–?) (male line extinct 17th cent.)
                - Filippo (c. 1560–c. 1607) (male line extinct c. 1642)
          - Angelo Giovanni (c. 1430–?)
        - Martino (?–c. 1424)
      - Stefano, Archbishop of Patras (?–1424)
      - Benedetto (?–c. 1418)
      - Erard IV, Baron of Arcadia (1401–1404)
    - Martino (c. 1336–c. 1375)
    - Filippo (?–c. 1402)
      - Giovanni (1402–?)
    - Manuele (?–c. 1413)
  - Octaviano (c. 1319–c. 1350)
  - Manfredo (c. 1319–c. 1350)

== Sources ==
- "Εγκαίνια Ιδρύματος Αντώνη Δαμαλά". Alithia.gr (in Greek). 26 May 2015.
- Argenti, Philip P. (1955). Libro d' Oro de la Noblesse de Chio. London Oxford University Press.
- Argenti, Philip P. (1958). The Occupation of Chios by the Genoese and their Administration of the Island 1346-1566. Cambridge University Press.
- "Αυτοδιοικητικές εκλογές 1903 - Βία και νοθεία στον Πειραιά". politischios.gr (in Greek). 29 December 2023.
- Bakounakis, Nikos (24 November 2008). "Η αόρατη Ελληνίδα (The Invisible Greek Woman)". To Vima (in Greek).
- Baloglou, Christos P. (2016). Βιβλιοκρισία: Ἀντωνίου Σ. Δαμαλᾶ, Ὁ οἰκονομικὸς βίος τῆς νήσου Χίου ἀπὸ τοῦ ἔτους 992 μ.Χ. μέχρι τοῦ 1566 [Book Review: Antonios S. Damalas, The Economic Life of the Island of Chios from 992 AD to 1566]. Byzantina Symmeikta (in Greek). 26 (2): 419–426. doi:10.12681/byzsym.9575.
- Battista de Burgo, Giovanni (1686). Viaggio di cinque anni in Asia, Africa, & Europa del Turco. Milan: Giuseppe Cossuto. ISBN 9789754282542.
- Biri, Costas (1997). Αρβανίτες, οι Δωριείς του Νεώτερου Ελληνισμού (in Greek). Melissa. ISBN 960-204-031-9.
- Bon, Antoine (1969). La Morée franque: recherches historiques, topographiques et archéologiques sur la principauté d'Achaïe (1205-1430). E. de Boccard.
- Calcagno, Daniele (2013). La Croce degli Zaccaria da Efeso a Genova (secoli IX-XIII).
- Cartledge, Yianni John Charles (2024-03-13). Aegean Islander Migration to the United Kingdom and Australia, 1815-1945: Emigration, Settlement, Community Building, and Integration (PDF) (PhD). Flinders University.
- Ceracchi, Mattia (2016). La comunità latino-cattolica di Istanbul nella prima età ottomana (1453-1696). Spazi sacri, luoghi di culto (Thesis). Sapienza University of Rome.
- Chalkokondyles, Laonikos (2014). The Histories. Harvard University Press. ISBN 978-0-674-59919-2.
- Cherubini, Paolo (1997). "Greci e Questione nelle Lettere di un Cardinale del Quattrocento". Eoa Kai Esperia. 3 (April). doi:10.12681/eoaesperia.42.
- d'Annunzio, Gabriele (1915). Merope: Canti della guerra d'oltremare. Laudi del cielo, del mare, della terra e degli eroi (in Italian). Milan: Treves.
- Δαμαλάς, Αντώνιος Σ. (1998). Ο οικονομικός βίος της Νήσου Χίου από έτους 992 Μ.Χ. μέχρι του 1566 (Doctoral Dissertation, University of Athens (1990)). Prologue by Dionysios Zakythinos (Volumes I–IV ed.). Athens, Greece: Όμιλος Επιχειρήσεων Δαμαλάς. ISBN 960-85185-0-4.
- Dourou-Iliopoulou, Maria (2005). The Frankish Principality of Achaea (1204-1432) History, Organization, Society. Thessaloniki: Vanias.
- Dourou-Iliopoulou, Maria (2019). Angevins and Aragonese in the Mediterranean. Athens: Herodotus. ISBN 978-960-485-325-0.
- Drakakis, Andreas Th. (1983). "Επισκέψεις του Βασιλέα Όθωνα στη Σύρο" [Visits of King Otto to Syros]. Syriana (in Greek). 20. Athens: Cultural Association of Expatriate Pano-Syrians "Pherecydes".
- "Επίσκεψη κ. Κωνσταντίνου-Παύλου Δαμαλά στην Καθολική Επισκοπή Σύρου". Catholic Diocese of Syros (in Greek). 26 June 2026.
- FamilySearch (1954). "Entry for Constantine J Damala, 1954". New York, New York Passenger and Crew Lists, 1909, 1925-1958. FamilySearch.
- Fitzsimons, Eleanor (2015). Wilde's Women: How Oscar Wilde Was Shaped by the Women He Knew. Duckworth Overlook. ISBN 978-0715649367.
- "Funerary Portrait of Jacques Damalà". Metropolitan Museum of Art.
- Γαΐλα, Τασσώ. "Πολιτιστικό Ίδρυμα Δαμαλά!". Tο μοσχάτο μου.
- Germanos, Freddy (1997). Τερέζα [Tereza] (in Greek). Athens: Kastaniotis Editions. ISBN 9789600318036.
- Gibb, H.A.R. (1959). The Travels of Ibn Battuta, A.D. 1325–1354. Vol. 2. Cambridge University Press.
- Gottlieb, Robert (2013). Sarah: The Life of Sarah Bernhardt. Yale University Press. ISBN 978-0-300-16879-2.
- Government of Maharashtra (1946). "Raj Bhavan Archives (A Class Files - Permanent Record)" (PDF). Government of Maharashtra.
- Guérin, Marie (2014). Les dames de la Morée franque (XIIIe-XVe siècle). Représentation, rôle et pouvoir des femmes de l'élite latine en Grèce médiévale. Université Paris-Sorbonne.
- Guía oficial de España (PDF). Madrid: Viuda de M. Minuesa de los Ríos. 1897.
- Hamilton, Bernard (2018). Crusaders, Cathars and the Holy Places. Routledge.
- Harris, Frank (1963). My Life and Loves. New York: Grove Press.
- "Jim Damalas - Creating Emerging Markets". Harvard Business School.
- Hopf, Carl Hermann Friedrich Johann (1873). Chroniques Gréco-Romanes Inédites ou peu Connues. Berlin: Librairie de Weidmann.
- "Επίσκεψη του κ. Κωνσταντίνου-Παύλου Δαμαλάς, απογόνου του Δημάρχου Ερμουπόλεως Αμβρόσιου Δαμαλά στον Σεβασμιώτατο κ. Δωρόθεο Β΄". Holy Metropolis of Syros (in Greek). 25 June 2026.
- "κατοικίες". ΤΑ ΙΣΤΟΡΙΚΑ ΜΝΗΜΕΙΑ ΤΗΣ ΣΥΡΟΥ (in Greek).
- "Επανασύσφιξη των δεσμών του Οίκου Ζαχαρία - Δαμαλά με τη Σύρο". Koinoniki (in Greek). 20 April 2026.
- Instituto Luis de Salazar y Castro, ed. (1983). XV Congreso Internacional de las Ciencias Genealógica y Heráldica: Volumen Oficial. Madrid: Ediciones Hidalguía. ISBN 9788400054359.
- "Σαν σήμερα το 1869 ήρθε στην Ελλάδα το ποδήλατο". korinthia.net.gr. 29 January 2021.
- Koukouni, Ioanna (2021). Chios dicta est... et in Aegæo sita mari: Historical Archaeology and Heraldry on Chios. Oxford: Archaeopress Publishing. ISBN 9781789697476.
- Krinos, Antonis I. (January 1990). "Από τη Sarah Bernhardt στο Νίκο Κάλας: Το οδοιπορικό της Σύρας στη Γαλλία" [From Sarah Bernhardt to Nikos Kalas: Syros's Journey in France]. Syriana Grammata (in Greek). 9.
- Lainas, Dimitrios (2001). "Ιστορικές χιακές οικογένειες - Ράλληδες, Σκαραμαγκάδες, Σκυλίτσηδες, Νεγρεπόντηδες, Ζυγομαλάδες, Δαμαλάδες". Πελινναιο (Pelinnaeo) (108 ed.). Χίος: Περιοδικό Χιόνη.
- Lainas, Dimitrios (2006). "Ο Στρατηγός Νικόλαος Πλαστήρας στην οικία Δαμαλά". Πελινναιο (Pelinnaeo) (39, Φθινόπωρο 2006 ed.). Koraes Library Chios: Περιοδικό Χιόνη.
- Loukos, Christos (2015). "Σύρος: Ημέρες εξέγερσης στην Ερμούπολη της Σύρου (1862)" [Syros: Days of Rebellion in Ermoupoli of Syros (1862)]. In Drakopoulou, Eugenia; Dimitropoulos, Dimitris (eds.). Ταξίδια στο Αιγαίο με πλοηγό την Ιστορία [Journeys in the Aegean with History as a Navigator] (in Greek). Athens: National Hellenic Research Foundation / Piraeus Port Authority. ISBN 978-960-9538-30-5.
- "Page 3163". The London Gazette. No. 27911. 8 May 1906.
- "Page 3887" (PDF). The London Gazette. No. 37670. 30 July 1946.
- Marconi, Steve (29 August 2024). "Jimmy the Greek". San Pedro Today.
- Miklosich, Franz (1860–1890). Acta et Diplomata Monasteriorum et Ecclesiarum Orientis Tomus Primus. Acta et Diplomata Graeca Medii Aevi Sacra et Profana. Vol. 4. Berlin: Vindobonae, C. Gerold.
- Miller, William (1911). "The Zaccaria of Phocaea and Chios (1275-1329)". The Journal of Hellenic Studies. 31. Macmillan: 42–55. doi:10.2307/624735.
- Miller, William (1908). The Latins in the Levant, A History of Frankish Greece (1204-1566). EP Dutton & Co.
- Minoglou, Ioanna Pepelasis; Ioannides, Stavros (2004). "Market-Embedded Clans in Theory and History: Greek Diaspora Trading Companies in the Nineteenth Century" (PDF). Business History Conference / Business & Economic History Online.
- Missailidis, Anna (2012). The Church of the Holy Apostles in the Village of Pyrgi on Chios (Thesis). Aristotle University of Thessaloniki.
- "Η κόρη της πόρνης που έγινε σταρ και παντρεύτηκε τον Α. Δαμαλά". Mixani Tou Chronou (in Greek).
- Morel-Fatio, Alfred, ed. (1885). Libro de los fechos et conquistas del principado de la Morea. Geneva: Imprimerie Jules-Guaume Fick.
- Nicol, Donald M. (1992). The immortal emperor: the life and legend of Constantine Palaiologos, last emperor of the Romans. University Press.
- "Nouvelles diverses". digital.la84.org.
- Patria, Societa Di Storia (1902). Archivio storico per le province napoletane. Fb&c Limited. ISBN 0366670484.
- "Ιστορική επίσκεψη στον Όμιλο Ερετών ηγεσίας του Οίκου Ζαχαρία-Δαμαλά". Piraeus365 (in Greek). May 2026.
- Πειραιωτών, Φωνή. "Ιδρυμα Για Τον Πολιτισμο, Την Επιστημη, Την Κοινωνια". Η Φωνη Των Πειραιωτων.
- Perris, Nikos Z. (1972). Ο Κάμπος [The Kampos] (in Greek). Vol. II. Chios.
- Philippedes, Marios; Hanak, Walter K. (2011). The siege and the fall of Constantinople in 1453, Historiography, Topography, and Military Studies.
- Rallis India Limited (1948). Memorandum of Association. Rallis India Limited.
- "Russian Imperial Corps of Pages: An Online Exhibition Catalog". Columbia University Libraries.
- Sansaridou-Hendrickx, Thecla (2008). The Chronicle of the Tocco. Greeks, Italians, Albanians and Turks in the Despotate of Epirus (14th-15th centuries) (in Greek). Thessaloniki: Stamoulis. ISBN 9789606741999.
- Schiro, Giuseppe (1975). Cronaca Dei Tocco Di Cefalonia. Roma: Accademia Nazionale Dei Lincei.
- Schmitt, Oliver J. (2007). Les Levantins: CADRES DE VIE ET IDENTITÉS D'UN GROUPE ETHNO-CONFESSIONNEL DE L'EMPIRE OTTOMAN AU "LONG" 19º SIÈCLE. London: Les Éditions Isis. ISBN 9754283486.
- Schull, Kent F. (2016). Living in the Ottoman Realm: Empire and Identity, 13th to 20th Centuries. Indiana University Press.
- Segalerba, Agostino Carlo (2022). Galata dei Genovesi. 1267-1453. Galata.
- Setton, Kenneth (1975). A History of the Crusades, The Fourteenth And Fifteenth Centuries. The University of Wisconsin Press.
- Shawcross, Teresa (2009). The Chronicle of Morea Historiography in Crusader Greece. Oxford University Press.
- Shupp, Paul F. (1933). "Review: Argenti, Philip P. The Massacre of Chios". Journal of Modern History. 5 (3). doi:10.1086/236057. JSTOR 1875872.
- Signori, Umberto (2017). Proteggere i privilegi dello straniero. I consoli veneziani nell'Impero ottomano tra Sei e Settecento (Thesis). University of Milan.
- Smith, Arnold C. (1962). The Architecture of Chios. London: Alec Tiranti.
- "Συνάντηση του Δημάρχου Σύρου-Ερμούπολης με τον κ. Κωνσταντίνο - Παύλο Δαμαλά". Syros Agenda (in Greek). 17 April 2026.
- "Συνάντηση του Δημάρχου Σύρου - Ερμούπολης με τον απόγονο της οικογένειας, Κωνσταντίνο - Παύλο Δαμαλά". Municipality of Syros-Ermoupolis (in Greek). 17 April 2026.
- "Η λανθασμένη πινακίδα της οδού Απόλλωνος και η ιστορική αλήθεια για τη διαμονή του Όθωνα στην Ερμούπολη". Syros Agenda (in Greek). May 2026.
- "Ο δρόμος έχει τη δική του ιστορία". www.syrostoday.gr.
- Sphrantzes, George (1980). The Fall of the Byzantine Empire - A Chronicle by George Sphrantzes.
- Sphrantzes, Georgios (2006). Short History (in Greek). Athens: Kanakis. ISBN 960-7420-94-2.
- "ΟΜΙΛΟΣ ΕΡΕΤΩΝ-Διεθνείς Διασυλλογικοί αγώνες "ΠΑΥΛΟΣ ΔΑΜΑΛΑΣ"". Sportal TV (in Greek). 5 April 2022.
- Stoker, Bram (1906). Personal Reminiscences of Henry Irving. Macmillan.
- Stornaiolo Silva, Ugo Stefano (2024). Achaean Disputes: Eight Centuries of Succession Conflicts for the Title of Prince of Achaea. Covington, LA & Boerne, TX, USA: Libertas Press. ISBN 1600200052.
- Sturdza, Mihail Dimitri (1999). Grandes familles de Grèce: d'Albanie et de Constantinople.
- "The Society of the Kampos on Chios and its Legacy from the Late Byzantine period to the Early Modern era – CeSGO" (in Italian).
- Thomopoulos, Stephanos (1998). History of the City of Patras, From the Ancient Times Until 1821 (in Greek). Achaean Publications. ISBN 960-7960-09-2.
- Topping, Peter (1975). "The Morea, 1364–1460". In Setton, Kenneth M.; Hazard, Harry W. (eds.). A History of the Crusades, Volume III: The Fourteenth and Fifteenth Centuries. Vol. 3. Madison and London: University of Wisconsin Press. ISBN 0-299-06670-3.
- Trapp, Erich (1978). "6490. Zαχαρίας Κεντυρίων". Prosopographisches Lexikon der Palaiologenzeit (in German). Vol. 3. Vienna: Verlag der Österreichischen Akademie der Wissenschaften.
- Treccani, Giovanni (2020). Dizionario biografico degli italiani (Vol. 100 ed.). Rome: Istituto dell'Enciclopedia Italiana. ISBN 9788812000326.
- Vlachogiannis, Ioannis (1910). Χιακόν Αρχείον [Chian Archive] (in Greek). Vol. V. Athens: P. D. Sakellariou.
- Zafeiriou Baos, Antonios (1971). Αμβρόσιος Ι. Δαμαλάς, Δήμαρχος Ερμουπόλεως (1853-1862) [Ambrosios I. Damalas, Mayor of Ermoupoli (1853-1862)] (in Greek). Athens.
- Zečević, Nada (2014). The Tocco of the Greek Realm: Nobility, Power and Migration in Latin Greece (14th – 15th Centuries). Makart. ISBN 978-8687115118.
- "Ιστορική επίσκεψη στον Όμιλο Ερετών ηγεσίας του Οίκου Ζαχαρία-Δαμαλά". ΖΩ ΣΤΟΝ ΠΕΙΡΑΙΑ (in Greek). May 2026.
- Ζολώτας, Γεωργιος Ιωαννου (1923). Ιστορια της Χιου. Vol. A II. Sakellarios.
- Ζολώτας, Γεωργιος Ιωαννου (1924). Ιστορια της Χιου. Vol. B. Sakellarios.
- Ζολώτας, Γεωργιος Ιωαννου (1926). Ιστορια της Χιου. Vol. 3. Sakellarios.
