= Prince of Achaea =

Sovereign of the Principality of Achaea

- Princeps Achaiae
- Initial coat of arms, used by the Villehardouin dynasty Final coat of arms, used by the Zaccaria dynasty

Details
- First monarch: William I of Champlitte
- Last monarch: Centurione III (ruling)
- Formed: 1205
- Abolished: 1432 (initial loss of the principality); 1454 (final loss of the principality)
- Residence: Andravida
- Appointer: Hereditary, vassal of the King of Thessalonica, the Latin Emperor, the King of Naples and by 1404 independent

The prince of Achaea was the ruler of the Principality of Achaea, one of the crusader states founded in Greece in the aftermath of the Fourth Crusade (1202–1204). The principality witnessed various overlords during its more than two centuries of existence, initially, Achaea was a vassal state of the Kingdom of Thessalonica under Boniface I of house Montferrat, then of the Latin Empire of Constantinople under the houses of Flanders-Courtenay, which had supplanted the Byzantine Empire, and later of the Angevin Kingdom of Naples. During the Angevin period, the princes were often absent, represented in the Principality by their baillis, who governed in their name. After 1404 the principality became sovereign as the Genoese Centurione II Zaccaria bought from the Neapolitan crown the princely rights.

The principality was one of the longest-lasting of the Latin states in Greece, outliving the Latin Empire itself by 171 years. It did not come to an end until 1432, when the Byzantine prince Thomas Palaiologos inherited the last remnants of the Principality through marriage to the daughter of the last prince, Centurione Zaccaria. With the Principality gone, the title of Prince of Achaea became vacant. However, in 1453 during the great Morean revolt of 1453-1454, John Asen Zaccaria, son of Centurione revived the Principality. He was confirmed as Prince by the Kingdom of Naples, the historical overlords of the Principality since 1267 and by Venice, though in 1455 John was forced to exile.

A title of the same styling, but not to be confused with the original sovereign princely title, was created almost two centuries later to honour the descent of Antonio di Tocco. Antonio was a descendant of Thomas Palaiologos and Catherine Zaccaria from a female line, twice broken. For this and several other reasons, he did not have a legal claim to the original title. Though in 1642, he successfully petitioned the King of Spain to exchange his patrimonial titles for a titular honour in the same styling of Prince of Achaea within the Neapolitan nobility. This titular honour was carried on with a sequence of titular princes that began with Antonio di Tocco and lasted until the death of his descendant Maria Maddalena Capece Galeota in 1933, whereafter the Neapolitan title became extinct.

== List of princes of Achaea, 1205–1432/54 ==
=== Champlitte dynasty (1205–1209) ===
Image	Name	Birth	Succession	Tenure	Length of tenure	Death	Ref
	William I of Champlitte	1160s Dijon	Knight of the Fourth Crusade, appointed by Boniface I, King of Thessalonica after the conquest of the Peloponnese	1205 – 1209	4 years	1209; Natural causes	

After a brief tenure as prince, William I received news that his brother Louis in Burgundy had died and decided to return home to France to claim the family lands. To govern the principality of Achaea, he left his old friend Geoffrey of Villehardouin as bailiff. William I died on his journey home in 1209. Champlitte had stipulated before his journey home that any lawful heir of his would have to claim the principality within a year and a day in the event of his death, or their claims would be forfeit. After his death, news reached Villehardouin that a cousin of William, Robert of Champlitte, was on his way to claim the principality. Wishing to claim the principality for himself, Villehardouin, with the assistance of Venice, placed various obstacles in Robert's way, including ensuring that he had to wait in Venice for two months before embarking, and once Robert reached Achaea, the time window stipulated by William had passed. Having obtained the principality through legal quibbles and fraud, Villehardouin was then proclaimed as the new Prince of Achaea.

=== Villehardouin dynasty (1210–1278) ===
Image	Name	Birth	Succession	Tenure	Length of tenure	Death	Ref
	Geoffrey I of Villehardouin	c. 1169	Bailiff of Achaea under William I, seized power in the aftermath of William I's death	1210 – c. 1229	c. 19 years	c. 1229 (aged c. 60); Natural causes	
	Geoffrey II of Villehardouin	c. 1195	Son of Geoffrey I	c. 1229 – 1246	c. 17 years	1246 (aged c. 51); Natural causes	
	William II of Villehardouin	c. 1211; Kalamata	Son of Geoffrey I	1246 – 1 May 1278	32 years	1 May 1278 (aged c. 51); Natural causes	

=== Angevin domination (1278–1396) ===
==== House of Anjou (1278–1289) ====
Image	Name	Birth	Succession	Tenure	Length of tenure	Death	Ref
	Charles I of Anjou	1226–1227	King of Naples. Charles's line was designated as heirs by the sonless William II after the marriage of William's daughter Isabella of Villehardouin and Charles's son Philip of Sicily. Philip of Sicily predeceased Charles, which made Charles the heir.	1 May 1278 – 7 January 1285	6 years, 8 months and 7 days	7 January 1285 (aged 57–59); Illness	
	Charles II of Naples	1254	King of Naples and son of Charles I	7 January 1285 – 16 September 1289	4 years, 8 months and 10 days	5 May 1309 (aged c. 55); Natural causes	

==== Houses of Villehardouin, Avesnes and Savoy (1289–1307) ====
Image	Name	Birth	Succession	Tenure	Length of tenure	Death	Ref
	Isabella of Villehardouin	1260–1263; Achaea	Daughter of William II of Villehardouin. Conferred the principality by Charles II, together with her husband Florent of Hainaut, upon their marriage in 1289.	16 September 1289 – 1307	18 years	23 January 1312 (aged c. 49/52); Natural causes	
	Florent of Hainaut –(with Isabella)–	c. 1255; Hainaut	Husband of Isabella of Villehardouin	16 September 1289 – 23 January 1297	7 years, 4 months and 8 days	23 January 1297 (aged c. 42); Died during a military campaign	
	Philip I of Savoy –(with Isabella)–	1278; Piedmont	Husband of Isabella of Villehardouin, invested as Prince of Achaea by Charles II upon their marriage in 1300	1300 – 1307	7 years	25 September 1334 (aged c. 56); Natural causes	

In 1307, Charles II revoked the position of Isabella and Philip I, on the grounds that their marriage having happened without his consent (despite having recognized Philip earlier) and Philip's refusal to assist Charles II in the king's campaigns against the Despotate of Epirus. Isabella and Florent had been granted the principality in 1289 on the condition that Isabella did not remarry without Charles II's consent in the event of Florent's death and Philip's refusal to aid Charles II constituted a gross breach of the feudal code. Isabella's eldest daughter, Matilda of Hainaut, may have unsuccessfully attempted to claim the principality in the immediate aftermath of her parents' deposition but was blocked from doing so by the local nobility, who awaited orders from Naples. Instead of seizing Achaea for himself once more, Charles bestowed it on his favorite son, Philip of Taranto, who soon after arrived in Achaea and received the allegiance of the local barons. To ensure that Isabella and Philip did not attempt to reclaim Achaea, their claims were also purchased and the couple were promised to County of Alba on the shores of the Fucine Lake as compensation.

==== House of Anjou (1307–1313) ====
Image	Name	Birth	Succession	Tenure	Length of tenure	Death	Ref
	Philip II of Taranto	10 November 1278; Naples	Son of Charles II, invested as Prince of Achaea by his father	1307 – July 1313	6 years	1331–1332 (aged c. 53/54); Natural causes	

In 1313, Philip II married Catherine of Valois, the titular Latin Empress, who had up until their marriage arrangements been betrothed to Hugh V, Duke of Burgundy. In order to compensate the House of Burgundy, it was arranged that Louis of Burgundy, Hugh V's younger brother, would marry Matilda of Hainaut, the eldest daughter of Isabella of Villehardouin, and that the two would then be granted the Principality of Achaea. After marriage, however, Louis and Matilda delayed in travelling to Greece and in the meantime, the usurper Ferdinand of Majorca seized control of the principality.

==== House of Barcelona (1315–1316) ====
Image	Name	Birth	Succession	Tenure	Length of tenure	Death	Ref
	Ferdinand of Majorca	1278; Perpignan	Married Isabella of Sabran, granddaughter of William II of Villehardouin, took control of the principality using a band of Italian and Aragonese mercenaries	June/July 1315 – 5 July 1316	1 year	5 July 1316 (aged c. 38); Killed at the Battle of Manolada	

==== Houses of Avesnes and Bourbon (1316–1321) ====
Image	Name	Birth	Succession	Tenure	Length of tenure	Death	Ref
	Matilda of Hainaut	29 November 1293; Achaea	Daughter of Isabella of Villehardouin and Florent of Hainaut, granted Achaea in 1313 but only took control in 1316.	5 July 1316 – 1321	5 years	1331 (aged c. 38); Died in custody	
	Louis of Burgundy –(with Matilda)–	1297; Burgundy	Husband of Matilda, conferred the principality by Philip II together with his wife	5 July 1316 – 2 August 1316	29 days	2 August 1316 (aged c. 19); Possibly poisoned	

After she was widowed in 1316, King Robert of Naples ruled that Matilda should marry his younger brother, John of Gravina, as part of a scheme to once more return the principality to the House of Anjou. Matilda however refused, and there was also protest from Odo IV of Burgundy, the brother and designated heir of Louis. Matilda was however brought to Naples by force and in 1318 compelled to go through with the marriage ceremony to John. Still defiant, the princess was brought before Pope John XXII at Avignon and there ordered to obey. Even when forced to marry by the pope, Matilda refused and replied that she had already married the Burgundian knight Hugh de La Palice, whom she was very attached to. This secret marriage gave Robert the excuse to revoke her position as Princess of Achaea, as she had not been allowed to marry without his consent per the agreements that preceded her elevation to the position. After a brief forced marriage to John, Matilda was imprisoned and the principality was simply bestowed upon John directly. Odo sold his claims to Louis I of Bourbon before Philip II of Taranto paid off Louis I with the same amount of money and a marriage between his son Philip and Louis' daughter Beatrice.

==== House of Anjou (1318–1381) ====
Image	Name	Birth	Succession	Tenure	Length of tenure	Death	Ref
	John of Gravina	1294; Naples	Briefly husband of Matilda of Hainaut against her will, made prince by his brother, Robert of Naples. John did not actually arrive in Greece until 1324 and left again in 1326, never returning.	March 1318 – 1333	15 years	5 April 1336 (aged c. 42); Natural causes	
	Catherine of Valois	1303	Titular Latin Empress. Catherine and her son Robert were transferred the Principality of Achaea by John in 1333 in exchange for their possessions in Epirus and Albania.	1333 – October 1346	13 years	October 1346 (aged c. 43); Natural causes	
	Robert of Taranto	1319–1326	Son of Catherine of Valois and Philip II. Transferred the principality by John in 1333, together with his mother. Sole ruler after 1346, though he never set foot in Achaea after his mother's death.	1333 – 10 September 1364	31 years	10 September 1364 (aged c. 45/38); Natural causes	
	Maria I of Bourbon	c. 1315; Burgundy	Daughter of Louis I of Bourbon, who bought Frankish claims from Odo IV of Burgundy and widow of Robert of Taranto; kept the title Princess of Achaea after his death and fought with his lawful successor, Philip III, to install her son by a previous marriage, Hugh of Lusignan, as prince.	10 September 1364 – 1370	6 years	1387 (aged c. 72); Natural causes	
	Hugh of Lusignan –(with Maria I)–	c. 1335	Son of Maria I and Guy of Lusignan, a son of Hugh IV of Cyprus, co-ruler during his mother's attempt to gain control of the principality	10 September 1364 – 1370	6 years	Unknown	
	Philip III of Taranto	1329	Brother and lawful heir of Robert of Taranto. Also purchased Maria I's rights in 1370, bringing their conflict to an end. Never visited Greece.	10 September 1364 – 25 November 1373	9 years, 2 months and 16 days	25 November 1373 (aged c. 44); Natural causes	
	Joanna of Naples	December 1325; Naples	Queen of Naples and widow of Louis I of Naples, son of Philip II, and James IV of Majorca, grandson of Ferdinand. Proclaimed Princess of Achaea by an envoy of Achaean barons after Philip III's death.	1373 – 1382	9 years	12 May 1382 (aged 58); Strangled in prison	
From 1377 to 1381, the Principality of Achaea is de facto under the control of the Knights Hospitaller under Grand Master Juan Fernández de Heredia, who were leased the principality by Joanna.

Joanna's acclamation to the Principality was contested by James of Baux, nephew of Philip III of Taranto, who was passed over by the Achaean barons in favor of the Queen. Hopf erroneously supposed that Joanna granted the Principality to her fourth husband, Otto of Brunswick, a mistake often repeated by subsequent historians. In reality, it was the Principality of Taranto he was granted, while Achaea seems from the sources to have remained in Joanna's possession.

==== House of Baux (1381–1383) ====
Image	Name	Birth	Succession	Tenure	Length of tenure	Death	Ref
	James of Baux	Unknown	Nephew and seniormost heir of Philip III, previously passed over in 1373. Invaded the principality in 1380 with the help of the Navarrese Company.	1380 – 17 July 1383	3 years	17 July 1383; Natural causes	

=== Interregnum (1383–1396) ===
James of Baux died childless in 1383, which left his hired army, the Navarrese Company, as the sole authority in Achaea and putting the Angevin rule to end. The commanders of the Navarrese Company, Mahiot de Coquerel (until 1386) and Peter of San Superano (after 1386) kept up the pretense that they were representatives of the Kings of Naples, the closest and strongest of the possible claimants to the principality, but they were for all intents and purposes rulers of an independent realm.

Image	Name	Birth	Succession	Tenure	Length of tenure	Death	Ref
	Charles III of Naples (nominally)	1345; Naples	King of Naples and grandson of John of Gravina. Recognized as Prince of Achaea by the Navarrese Company.	17 July 1383 – 24 February 1386	2 years, 7 months and 8 days	24 February 1386 (aged 41); Assassinated	
	Ladislaus of Naples (nominally)	15 February 1377; Naples	King of Naples and son of Charles III	24 February 1386 – 1396	10 years	6 August 1414 (aged 37); Illness	

In addition to the nominal princes listed above, there were also numerous other rival claimants that rose during this time:

- Louis I of Anjou – designated heir of James of Baux, Joanna of Naples and Isabella of Majorca, daughter of James III of Majorca.
  - Marie of Blois, Duchess of Anjou – widow and designated heir of Louis I of Anjou as regent for Louis II of Anjou. Eventually sold her claim to Juan Fernández de Heredia of the Knights Hospitaller
- Louis II, Duke of Bourbon – nephew and designated heir of Maria I of Bourbon (who ruled as princess 1364–1370).
- Amadeo of Savoy – grandson of Philip I of Savoy (who ruled as prince 1300–1307).
  - Louis of Piedmont – brother and heir of Amadeo of Savoy.
- Juan Fernández de Heredia, Grand Master of the Knights Hospitaller – sought to regain the principality for the Knights Hospitaller, eventually succeeded in purchasing the claims of Marie of Blois, though the sale was contested by Amadeo of Savoy and Antipope Clement VII annulled it.

=== Navarrese-Genoese dynasty (1396–1432/54) ===
Image	Name	Birth	Succession	Tenure	Length of tenure	Death	Ref
	Peter of San Superano	Unknown	Commander of the Navarrese Company, conferred the position of "hereditary Prince of Achaea" by Ladislaus of Naples in 1396	1396 – 1402	6 years	1402; Natural causes	
	Maria II; Zaccaria	Unknown	Widow of Peter, regent for his infant son	1402 – 1404	2 years	Unknown	
	Centurione II; Zaccaria	Unknown	Nephew of Maria, confirmed as prince by Ladislaus of Naples after taking over control from Maria	1404 – 1432	28 years	1432; Natural causes	
	John Asen Centurione III; Zaccaria	Unknown	Son of Centurione II, confirmed as prince by King Alfonso of Naples, recognised by Venice after being proclaimed Prince of Achaea during the great Morean revolt of 1453.	1453 – 1454	2 years	1469; Natural causes	

== Table of rival successions ==
	Angevin	Villehardouin			
—		Geoffrey I (1210–c. 1229)			—
—		Geoffrey II (c. 1229–1246)			—
—	Philip/Isabella (as William's heirs)	William (1246–1278)			—
—	Charles I (1278–1285)	Isabella (1278–1289)			—
—	Charles II (1285–1289)	Isabella (1278–1289)			—
—	Isabella/Florent (1289–1297)				—
—	Isabella/Philip I (1301–1312)				
—	Philip II (1307–1313)				
Bourbon	Angevin	Hainaut	Majorcan		Savoyad
Matilda/Louis (1313–1316)			Margaret (1313–1314)		Philip I (1312–1334)
Odo IV (1316–1320)	John (1318–1332)	Matilda (1316–1331)	Ferdinand/Isabella (1315–1316)		Philip I (1312–1334)
Louis I (1320–1321)	John (1318–1332)	Matilda (1316–1331)	James III (1316/31–1349)		James (1334–1367)
Robert II (1332–1347)			James III (1316/31–1349)		James (1334–1367)
Robert II/Marie (1347–1364)		James IV (1349–1373)			James (1334–1367)
Hugh (1364–1370/85)	Philip III (1364–1373)	James IV (1349–1373)			Amadeus (1367–1402)
Louis II (1385–1410)	James (1380–1383)	Joanna I (1373–1381)			Amadeus (1367–1402)
Louis II (1385–1410)	Valois		Angevin		Amadeus (1367–1402)
Louis II (1385–1410)	Louis I (1383–1384)		Charles III (1381/3–1386)		Amadeus (1367–1402)
Louis II (1385–1410)	Louis II (1384–1387)		Charles III (1381/3–1386)		Amadeus (1367–1402)
Louis II (1385–1410)	Juan Fernández (1387–1389)		Ladislaus (1386–1396/1404)		Amadeus (1367–1402)
Louis II (1385–1410)	—		Ladislaus (1386–1396/1404)		Louis (1402–1418)
—	—		Zaccaria	Palaiologan	—
—	—		Pedro (1396–1402)		—
—	—		Centurione II (1402–1429)		—
—	—		John (1453–1469)	Thomas/Catherine (1432–1460) (not official used)	—

== Later claimants ==
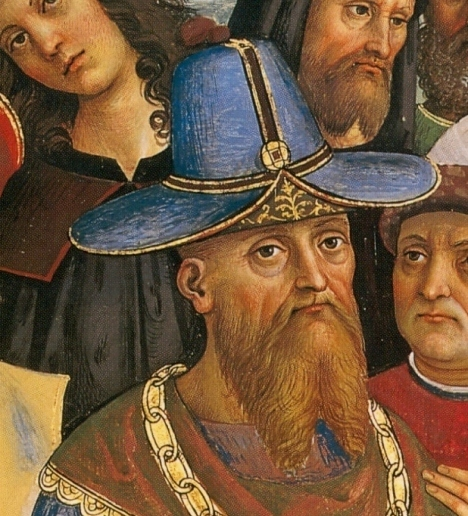
Portrait of Thomas Palaiologos, who inherited Centurione Zaccaria's lands in 1432

Upon the death of Centurione Zaccaria in 1432, his territories were forcefully inherited by Thomas Palaiologos, Despot of the Morea, who had married a daughter of Centurione, Catherine Zaccaria. Although Thomas thus ruled portions of the Peloponnese, including all of Centurione's former territory, and had inherited the title through his marriage with Catherine, he never used it. Though he did not use or acknowledge the title, his brother-in-law, John Asen Zaccaria, successfully reclaimed his patrimonial inheritance and achieved international recognition as Prince of Achaea.

Some modern historians consider Thomas Palaiologos to have been the Prince of Achaea from 1432 to 1460, though that is a modern historiographical designation for him.

=== The line of John Asen Zaccaria ===
In 1453, John Asen Zaccaria, the son of Centurione from his marriage with a woman of the Palaiologos Asen clan, reclaimed his father's title and declared war against Thomas and his brother Demetrios. Unlike Thomas, John was confirmed as a legitimate Prince by the King of Naples Alfonso, and also by Venice. The recognition by Naples was a gesture of great significance due to the Crown of Naples being the suzerain of the Principality of Achaea since the Treaty of Viterbo that was signed in 1267 between Charles I of Anjou and William II of Villehardouin and the only legitimate force with the power to appoint Princes. It was also Naples and King Ladislaus that had also confirmed Centurione II, father of John, as Prince in 1404 and deprived Maria Zaccaria of her power as reigning princess. However, Thomas and his Turkish allies were victorious and John sought shelter in Venetian Modon and later in Italy. There he continued to be regarded as the legitimate Prince of Achaea by the Papacy. The Popes offered to John -"domino Johanni Zaccarie olim Amoree principi"- a symbolic pension of twenty florins a month. Zaccaria was also recognised as titular Prince of Morea by the city of Genoa, where he offered a precious reliquary, the so-called Zaccaria Cross that presumably contained pieces of the True Cross belonging to St John the Evangelist.

==== Imposter Pretenders ====
Some impostor pretenders to Byzantine descent historically claimed the position. From the late 15th century to 1530, the Albanian exile Constantine Arianiti claimed the title "Duke of Achaea", among others. Later in the 16th century, the title might have been claimed by Giovanni Demetrio Angeli (1499–1571), part of the Angelo Flavio Comneno family, which claimed descent from the Byzantine Angelos dynasty.

=== The Tocco claims 1642–1933 ===
On 4 November 1642, Philip IV of Spain confirmed through a royal diploma the right of Antonio di Tocco to style himself as the titular Prince of Achaea.This title was of the same styling, but not to be confused with the original sovereign princely title, was created almost two centuries later to honour the descent of Antonio di Tocco.

The Tocco were descended from Thomas and Catherine's eldest daughter, Helena Palaiologina, and her middle daughter, Milica Branković. Since Antonio was a descendant from a female line, twice broken, and several other reasons, he did not have a legal claim to the original title. Though in the aforementioned year of 1642, he successfully petitioned the King of Spain to exchange his patrimonial titles for a titular honour in the same styling of Prince of Achaea within the Neapolitan nobility. This titular honour was carried on with a sequence of titular princes that began with Antonio di Tocco and lasted until the death of his descendant Maria Maddalena Capece Galeota in 1933, whereafter the Neapolitan title became extinct.
