= John Asen Zaccaria =

Prince of Achaea

Prince of Achaea
- Reign: 1453 - 1454
- Predecessor: Centurione II Zaccaria

Prince of Achaea (titular)
- Reign: 1454–1469
- Died: 1469; Italy, Rome
- Spouse: Magdalene Tocco
- Issue: Antonio Zaccaria; Angelo Zaccaria; N.N. Zaccaria (daughter)
- House: Zaccaria
- Father: Centurione II Zaccaria
- Mother: Palaiologina Asenina
- Religion: Roman Catholic

John Asen Zaccaria or Asanes Zaccaria (Italian: Giovanni Asano Zaccaria; died 1469) was the firstborn son of Centurione II Zaccaria and a Byzantine princess from the Asen branch of the imperial Palaiologos family.

He was proclaimed Prince of Achaea during the great Morean revolt of 1453-54 and was recognized as such by the King of Naples, the Republics of Venice and Genoa, the Duke of Milan, and the Papacy. He was called Centurione III, following his paternal name, and is considered to be the last ruling Prince of Achaea having ruled in Morea, as well as the first titular Prince of Achaea in exile.

== Biography ==
In 1429, Prince Centurione was besieged inside the castle of Chalandritsa by the forces of Thomas Palaiologos. John dispatched a messenger with the name John Balotas to Constantine Palaiologos (who would become the last emperor of the eastern Roman empire) to declare that John preferred to hand over Chalandritsa to Theodora Tocco, wife of Constantine, as she was a sister of his spouse Magdalene Tocco and he preferred to give the castle to Constantine rather of Thomas. Constantine refused the offer stating that this could result in unnecessary fighting between the Palaiologoi brothers.

In the same year, Centurione was forced to surrender Chalandritsa to Thomas and give him the hand of his daughter Catherine Zaccaria to marry. Thomas as a husband of Catherine was to inherit all of his lands after his death. During the arrangements, Centurione ensured that his heir John would retain his princely title even only by name.. He died in 1432 and the last remnants of the principality of Achaea passed to the despotate of Morea. The mother of John, a lady of the Asen-Palaiologos houses was imprisoned at Chlemoutsi, where she spend the rest of her days.

In 1446 John made his first attempt to restore the principality of his father, during the great invasion of Sultan Murad in Morea. It seems John had allies among the Greek nobility of Morea so when a Byzantine magnate rose in rebellion against the Palaiologoi brothers Thomas and Demetrios he proclaimed John as Prince of Achaea. However the rising failed its purpose and John along with his eldest son was imprisoned in the Chlemoutsi castle by Thomas Palaiologos.. Thomas was his brother in law as he was married with Catherine Zaccaria, the sister of John. It was rumoured that Thomas allowed the last men of the Zaccarias dynasty to die of hunger, but against his designs they remained alive. On 1453 John and his son Antonio escaped Chlemoutsi after persuading their gaoler to release them. They took advantage of a widespread revolt against the Despots and seized the castle of Aetos, which raised the flags of Zaccarias.

The Byzantine contemporary historian George Sphrantzes recorded the renovation of the Principality in the following short passage: "At Morea, the brother in law of Thomas, the son of Prince Centurione, had escaped from the prison of the Chlemoutsi Castle causing disruption to the region, while the Sultan was concentrated against Serbia".

The Venetian Doge Francis Foscari and King Alfonso V of Naples sent John congratulation letters, recognising him as "Prince Centurione III". The recognition of Johns title by the Crown of Naples was a gesture of great importance since the sovereigns of Naples were the nominal overlords of the Principality of Achaea following the Viterbo treaty of William of Villehardouin and Charles of Anjou at 1267. John also requested from the sultan recognition as Prince of Morea but Mehmed reinforced the Palaiologoi brothers.

John achieved the support of many Latins, Greeks, and Albanians and with them compromising his army, he besieged the city of Patras under Thomas's rule. However, after Turahan Bey invaded Morea he abandoned the siege and retreated in Aetos. In 1454, faced with the united forces of Despot Thomas and his Turkish allies he abandoned the fortress and fled to the Venetian stronghold of Modon. The city of Aetos submitted and the terms were that it would provide one thousand slaves to the army, weapons, and pack animals.

== Exile ==
After having escaped capture with his family, he found refuge with the Venetians in Methoni, where he remained for a period of almost two years. In 1456, he retired under King Alfonso of Naples. In 1457, the Venetian Republic, recognising his high political value as titular Prince of Morea, also granted him an annuity, on the condition John would continue to reside in Modon or wherever else he could be most useful to the designs of Venice.

In 1459 he lost this Venetian annuity when he relocated to their enemy and his ancestral home of Genoa. There, the Doge wrote him a letter of recommendation to Pope Pius II for support. There he received his acknowledgement as the Prince of Achaea in exile by the Republic, where he endowed a precious reliquary of his family, the so-called Zaccaria Cross that is said to contain pieces of the True Cross belonging to St John the Evangelist. This reliquary remains in the treasury of Metropolitan Cathedral of Saint Lawrence to this day, and is considered one of Genoa’s most important relics.

On 21 April, 1461 the pope received an additional letter from the Duke of Milan, Francesco I Sforza, who also recommended that John should receive support,“considering the great disturbances and adversities which he had suffered from both the Turks and from the Greeks.”

In September 1461, John moved to Rome where he was welcomed to the papal court of Pope Paul II, who granted him a monthly pension of twenty florins as the Prince of Achaea until his death in 1469.

== Family ==
John married a woman named Magdalene. Sphrantzes notes that the wife of John was a sister of Theodora Tocco, wife of Constantine XI Palaiologos, calling the two men as "brothers in law", thus Magdalene was a member of the house Tocco and a daughter of Leonardo II Tocco. She is also attested in a letter addressed to her husband by the King of Naples Alfonso V of Aragon. In this she is mentioned as "the most majestic woman Magdalene Asenina Zaccaria" (having adopted the family names of John) and also receives recognition of her title as Princess of Achaea. Together they had at least three children:

1. Antonio. He was imprisoned along with his parents at the Chlemoutsi fortress and later in 1453 escaped. He participated in the uprising of his father and then followed him in exile.
2. Angelo.
3. Daughter, name unknown. She was given as wife to the lord of Chlemoutsi. He agreed to release John from prison and joined him in his uprising.

== The alleged illegitimacy ==
There is a common misconception that John Asen Zaccara was an illegitimate son of Centurione, born to an unknown mistress. In reality, there is no primary source, either Greek nor Latin, that asserts that John was a bastard.

On the contrary, the contemporary chronicler George Sphrantzes calls John the only son of Centurione. At the same time, his later recognition by the Neapolitan monarch and the Doge of Venice as prince of Achaea demonstrates that John Asen was showered with the honors proper for a legitimate prince, and thus, a legitimate firstborn son of the previous prince.

The source of this inaccuracy can be traced back to the German historian of the late 19th century, Carl Hopf. It was in Hopf's genealogical account of the Zaccaria family that stigmatized John as a bastard descendant, without providing the evidence that led him to this conclusion. As such, it should be considered as merely Hopf’s assumption, one of the many other unreliable claims he made on the genealogies of Frankokratia and medieval Greece.

Furthermore, John could not be illegitimate as he married Maddalena Tocco, a scion of the Tocco family that ruled the Despotate of Epirus and the islands of Cephalonia and Zakynthos during the same period. Additionally, it is extremely doubtful that John Asen's father, Centurione II, would take as mistress a woman hailing from the Bulgarian and Byzantine imperial houses of Asen and Palaiologos, who was the mother of John.

Lastly, after the fall of the principality in 1429, Thomas Palaiologos and Centurione II agreed that John was to keep the princely title, as well as the barony of Arcadia, despite Thomas incorporating the remaining Achaean territories into the Despotate of the Morea. This arrangement could not have happened if John was an illegitimate son.

== Sources ==
- Miller, William (1908). The Latins in the Levant: A History of Frankish Greece (1204–1566). London: John Murray. OCLC 563022439.
- Topping, Peter (1975). "The Morea, 1364–1460". In Setton, Kenneth M.; Hazard, Harry W. (eds.). A History of the Crusades, Volume III: The Fourteenth and Fifteenth Centuries. Vol. 3. Madison and London: University of Wisconsin Press. pp. 141–166. ISBN 0-299-06670-3.
- Cherubini, Paolo (1997). "Greci e Questione nelle Lettere di un Cardinale del Quattrocento". Eoa Kai Esperia. 3 (April). doi:10.12681/eoaesperia.42.
- Stornaiolo Silva, Ugo Stefano (2024). Achaean Disputes: Eight Centuries of Succession Conflicts for the Title of Prince of Achaea. Covington, LA & Boerne, TX, USA: Libertas Press. ISBN 1600200052.
- Chalkokondyles, Laonikos (2014). The Histories. Harvard University Press. ISBN 978-0-674-59919-2.
- Trapp, Erich; Walther, Rainer; Beyer, Hans-Veit; Sturm-Schnabl, Katja (1978). "6490. Zαχαρίας Κεντυρίων". Prosopographisches Lexikon der Palaiologenzeit (in German). Vol. 3. Vienna: Verlag der Österreichischen Akademie der Wissenschaften.
- Sphrantzes, Georgios (2006). Short History (in Greek). Athens: Kanakis. p. 113. ISBN 960-7420-94-2.
- Hamilton, Bernard (2018). Crusaders, Cathars and the Holy Places. Routledge.
- Biri, Costas (1997). Αρβανίτες, οι Δωριείς του Νεώτερου Ελληνισμού (in Greek). Μέλισσα. ISBN 960-204-031-9.
- Venning, Timothy (2006). A Chronology of the Byzantine Empire. p. 728.
- Sturdza, Mihail Dimitri (1999). Grandes familles de Grèce: d'Albanie et de Constantinople (in French).
- Haberstumpf, Walter (1995). Dinastie europee nel Mediterraneo orientale. Torino: Scriptorium.
