= Centurione II Zaccaria =

Prince of Achaea

Centurione II Asanes Zaccaria

Prince of Achaea
- Reign: 1404–1429
- Predecessor: Maria II Zaccaria
- Successor: John Asen Zaccaria

Baron of Arcadia
- Reign: 1401–1432
- Predecessor: Erard IV Zaccaria

Baron of Chalandritsa
- Reign: 1401–1429
- Predecessor: Andronikos Asen Zaccaria

Bailee of Achaea (for Maria II)
- Reign: 1402–1404
- Died: 1432; Barony of Arcadia, Kyparissia
- Spouse: Asenina Palaiologina
- Issue: John; Catherine
- House: Zaccaria family
- Father: Andronikos Asen Zaccaria
- Mother: Catherine Le Maure
- Religion: Roman Catholicism

Centurione II Asanes Zaccaria (died 1432), scion of a powerful Genoese merchant family established in the Morea since the marriage of the lord of Chios Martino Zaccaria to the baroness Jacqueline de la Roche. Centurione purchased the rights of the title of Prince of Achaea by Ladislaus of Naples in 1404 and was the last ruler of the once Latin Empire not under Byzantine suzerainty.

== Early years ==
Centurione was the son of Andronikos Asen Zaccaria and of Catherine Le Maure, daughter of Erard III, baron of Arcadia. He was also grandson of Centurione I Zaccaria, bailee of the principality. He succeeded his father Andronikos in the barony of Arkadia (not to be confused with the region of the same name), barony of Chalandritsa in 1401 and also held the title of the lost to the Byzantines barony of Damala.

After the death of Prince Pedro San Superan, his widow Maria, sister of Andronikos and aunt of Centurione, took command of the Principality, ruling Achaea in her own right until her children coming to age. Maria appointed her nephew Centurione that trusted greatly as her Bailee. In the past, Pedro had pledged to the King of Naples Ladislaus 3.000 ducats in exchange for the title of the ruler of Morea, an amount of coins he never yielded. Ladislaus revived his demands by asking Maria to bestow him the ducats immediately, which also Maria didn't favor. Centurione acted secretly and dispatched a trusted person in Naples to inform Ladislaus that Maria and her children couldn't grant him the money. Still, he was eager to pay them as long as he was recognized as the only ruler of the Principality. Ladislaus accepted the unexpected offer of Centurione and declared the fall of Maria and her offspring from the throne of Achaea and in 1404 Centurione was recognized as Prince of Achaea. Actually, the family of Zaccarias followed the rules of Salic Law with men leading the family generation after generation.

Centurione then made his brother Stephen the Latin Archbishop of Patras. Centurione married with a Byzantine lady hailing from the prestigious houses of Asen-Palaiologos and also the family of Tzamblakon. Together they had at least four children: John, Catherine, Martino and a daughter that married the adventurer Oliver Franco in 1418, after this one seized the port-city of Glarentsa. The Byzantine wife of Centurione is mentioned in more than one occasion in the Chronicle of Toccos as "the princess".

== War with the Toccos for Glarentza ==
At the early years of Centuriones reign the main foe of the Zaccaria of Achaea were the family of Toccos. Carlo I Tocco, duke of Leucas, had Ladislaus absolve him from his feudal obligations to Achaea (1406) and then, allied with Theodore I Palaiologos, Despot of Morea. The death of Theodore in 1407 broke the alliance and saved Centurione from a strong opponent. Prince Pedro had offered to Leonard Tocco fiefs inside the principality, but in 1404 Centurione seized the estates. Ladislaus ordered Centurione to surrender them to Leonard, but the Prince most likely ignored the command. The author of the chronicle of Toccos justified the invasion of the Tocco brothers to Achaea by stating that Centurione had unleashed terrible raids to the islands held by the family. At 1405 Carlos managed to displace many Albanians from Aetolia. The majority of them sought shelter to the lands of the Centurione, passing to Achaea by Lepanto. However, Leonardo and Carlo conquered Glarentza in 1408 the greatest sea port of the Principality. Centurione was forced to ally with the Venetians and Justinian, Lord of Chios. During the same time, Stephen, abandoned the diocese of Patras to the Venetians on loan for five years. At 1414, while Carlo was occupied fighting the Albanians of Arta, Centurione with the support of the Albanians under his command was able to retake Glarentza and expel the Toccos. Centurione was so successful on land and sea that the Tocco brothers appealed to Venice so to accept them as their vassals. The republic mediated a three-year armistice in 1414 with the prince holding Glarentza.

== The gradual conquest of the Principality by the Palaiologoi ==
Thereafter, for three years, Centurione could obtain no help from Genoa, pressed by the Duke of Milan on land and by the Crown of Aragon at sea. In 1417, the imperial army of Constantinople, led by the despot Theodore II Palaeologus and Emperor John VIII, invaded Achaea. They took Messenia and Elis and holed up Centurione in Glarentza, from which he fled by sea in the spring of 1418. Only by the mediation of the Venetians occupying Navarino was the prince able to secure a truce. In 1418, Olivier Franco, a former captain of the Toccos seized Glarentza and imprisoned Benedict Zaccaria, the brother of Centurione, along with his Asenina-Palaiologina princess and children expecting ransom for their release. Centurione was forced to give the hand of one of his daughters to the adventurer with Glarentza as her dower. However in 1421 Olivier sold Glarentza to Carlo Tocco and abandoned Greece.

In front of the danger of the Palaiologoi, at 1422, the family of Zaccarias, tried to arouse the interest of the Hospitallers of Rhodes for Morea overall and inform them about the intention of Stephen to offer Patras to their order. The Hospitallers in a letter that they addressed to Centurione, Stephen and also the despot Theodore II refused the offer as they didn't want to be again involved in the domestic business of Morea. They excused their denial by pointing out that they were occupied against the Turkish pirates of Asia Minor that recently had attacked Ephesus.

All that was left of the principality that once dominated Greece were the baronies of Chalandritsa and Arcadia, such as the ancestral castle of Chalandritsa and the castle of Kyparrisia that still hold out for the Zaccarias. During those hard times, Centurione and the Toccos approached one another against the Palaiologoi. Hopf suggested that Centurione married the niece of Carlo Tocco, a daughter of his brother Leonardo II, whom he names Creusa. However, more contemporary research has concluded that Creusa was married to Constantine XI Palaiologos and later renamed Theodora Tocco. Also Nada Zečević in his comprehensive history of the family of Toccos mentions nothing about a second marriage of Centurione to a Tocco lady and only notes the marriage of John Asen Zaccaria to a daughter of Leonardo Tocco. This last wedding is also plainly attested in the chronicle of George Sphrantzes. Neither the unknown author of the Chronicle of Toccos cites a Tocco princess marrying Centurione, even if this writer was greatly familiar with the relatives of Carlo I.

Its evident that the illegitimate son of Carlo, Ercule Tocco, assisted by a small group of Zaccaria soldiers unleashed raids against lands of the despotate of Morea. But in the same year, the despot of Mystras Theodore II and Centurione clashed over some disputed areas. Theodore II attacked Centurione and defeated him in battle. The prince was imprisoned for a short time and then was set free.

In 1429, Thomas Palaeologus besieged Centurione in Chalandritsa. The prince resisted for some time but eventually he surrendered. Thomas forced him to a treaty whereby his daughter, Catherine, would marry the despot and thus make him Centurione's heir in Achaea. Centurione was allowed to keep his inheritance, the barony of Arcadia. Centurione retired to Arcadia in 1430, after the marriage was finalised. He died there two years later in 1432. He was still hoping in vain for Genoese aid. His domains passed to the despotate of Morea and into Byzantine hands. A source reports that Thomas cut the feet and hands of Centurione after his final defeat.

John Asen Zaccaria, the first born son of Centurione, at 1453 revived the title of the Prince of Achaea during the great Morean revolt and unlike Thomas was recognised by the great Western powers of the time as the only legitimate Prince. These were the Kingdom of Naples with Alfonso V of Aragon styling John as "Prince Centurione III", Venice and the Papacy in Rome.

From the reign of Centurione survives a document, where we see the prince assigning lands, vineyards, trees and servants to Egidio de Leonessa and his descendants.

== Family ==
From his marriage to the Asenina-Palaiologina lady, Centurione had four children:

1. John Asen Zaccaria: he revived the Principality of Achaea for a short period in 1453 but was later forced to exile by Thomas Palaiologos and his Turkish allies. He was married to Magdalene Tocco and had at least three children.
2. Catherine Zaccaria: she was married to Thomas Palaiologos in 1430 at Mystras and became Despoina of Morea. After the death of Constantine XI Palaiologos, her husband Thomas started to be regarded as basileus (emperor of the Romans) and we find Catherine addressed as basilissa (empress).
3. Martino: he was regarded for a time as Prince of Achaea but nothing else is recorded of him.
4. Unknown daughter: she was married to Oliver Franco after he conquered Glarentza in 1418. Franco in 1421 sold the city to Carlo Tocco, but her subsequent fate remains unknown.

== See also ==
- Zaccaria
- Centurione I Zaccaria
- Benedetto I Zaccaria
- Republic of Genoa

== Sources ==
- Bon, Antoine (1969). La Morée franque. Recherches historiques, topographiques et archéologiques sur la principauté d'Achaïe [The Frankish Morea. Historical, Topographic and Archaeological Studies on the Principality of Achaea] (in French). Paris: De Boccard.
- Topping, Peter (1975). "The Morea, 1364–1460". In Setton, Kenneth M.; Hazard, Harry W. (eds.). A History of the Crusades, Volume III: The Fourteenth and Fifteenth Centuries. Vol. 3. Madison and London: University of Wisconsin Press. pp. 141–166. ISBN 0-299-06670-3.

Regnal titles
| Preceded by Maria II Zaccaria | Prince of Achaea; 1404–1430 | Conquest by the Despotate of the Morea |
| Preceded by Andronikos Asen Zaccaria | Baron of Arcadia; 1401–1432 | Conquest by the Despotate of the Morea |
