= Princess Asenina Palaiologina (wife of Centurione II) =

Princess of Achaea

Asenina Palaiologina was the wife of Centurione II Zaccaria, one of the last Princes of Achaea (1404-1429) and through her marriage, she became consort of the Latin Principality.

== Biography ==
The actual name of the Princess does not survive, but we know that through her father she descended from the prestigious imperial families of Palaiologos and Asen and that through her mother by the house of Tzamplakon. The name of her maternal grandparents survives as her grandfather was Demetrios Tzamplakon and her grandmother was his wife Eudokia Palaiologina.

Asenina Palaiologina is cited in more than one occasion in the Chronicle of the Tocco, a chronicle discussing the reign of Carlo I Tocco, despot of Epirus. In 1418 Centurione employed a group of mercenaries under their leader Olivier Franco so to aid him against the Despotate of the Morea, yet Olivier was too ambitious for this and soon betrayed his master. Seeing that the Prince was absent and that the great coastal city of Glarentza had few men guarding its walls, he laid siege on it. It appears Centurione had left Asenina Palaiologina in charge of the city. She was there along with her children and her brother-in-law Benedict Zaccaria. Olivier stormed Glarentza and imprisoned the princely family demanding for Centurione to ransom them. In the same year, Centurione and Olivier came to an agreement. Olivier would marry one of his daughters—her name does not survive either—and he would receive Glarentza as her dowry. That way Asenina Palaiologina reunited with her husband.

Indeed, later the Chronicle mentions her at the side of Centurione at Pontikokastro then under the control of the Toccos. Centurione asked Ercole Tocco an illegitimate son of Carlo for men so to pass to his Barony of Arcadia, as he didn't have many soldiers with him and he was fearful of a possible attack by the Palaiologoi. Ercule granted his request and Centurione with Asenina Palaiologina reached safe to their barony.

In 1429, Despot Thomas Palaiologos besieged Centurione in Chalandritsa. The prince resisted for some time but eventually, he surrendered. Thomas forced him to a treaty whereby their daughter, Catherine Zaccaria, would marry the despot and thus make him Centurione's heir in Achaea. Centurione was allowed to keep his inheritance, the barony of Arcadia with the castle of Kyparissia as his household. During the arrangements, Centurione made sure that his son John Asen Zaccaria would at least retain his princely title even only by name. Centurione retired to Arcadia in 1430, after the marriage was finalized. He died there two years later in 1432. He was still hoping in vain for Genoese aid. His domains passed to the despotate of Morea and into Byzantine hands.

After his death, the widowed princess of Centurione was targeted by Thomas. According to Chalkokondyles, Asenina Palaiologina was imprisoned at Chlemoutsi castle, where she would spend the rest of her days. It has been suggested that Thomas accused his mother-in-law of scheming against him, presumably to place her son John on the throne.

Sphrantzes in his Short History mentions a Kydonides Tzamblakon next to Thomas Palaiologos, that he calls the most beloved uncle of his wife Catherine. At 1459 this man helped Thomas in his war against his brother Demetrios Palaiologos. Kydonides Tzamblakon was married to a sister of Princess Asenina Palaiologina, while Sphrantzes himself was married to Helena Tzamblakina, a niece of the princess.

== Family ==
From his marriage to the Asenina Palaiologina lady, Centurione had four children:

1. John Asen Zaccaria: he revived the Principality of Achaea for a short period in 1453 but was later forced to exile by Thomas Palaiologos and his Turkish allies. He was married to Magdalene Tocco and had at least three children.
2. Catherine Zaccaria: she was married to Thomas Palaiologos in 1430 at Mystras and became Despoina of Morea. After the death of Constantine XI Palaiologos, her husband Thomas started to be regarded as basileus (emperor of the Romans) and we find Catherine addressed as basilissa (empress).
3. Martino: he was regarded for a time as Prince of Achaea but nothing else is recorded of him.
4. Unknown daughter: she was married to Oliver Franco after he conquered Glarentza in 1418. Franco in 1421 sold the city to Carlo Tocco, but her subsequent fate remains unknown.
