= History of European consuls in the Ottoman Empire =

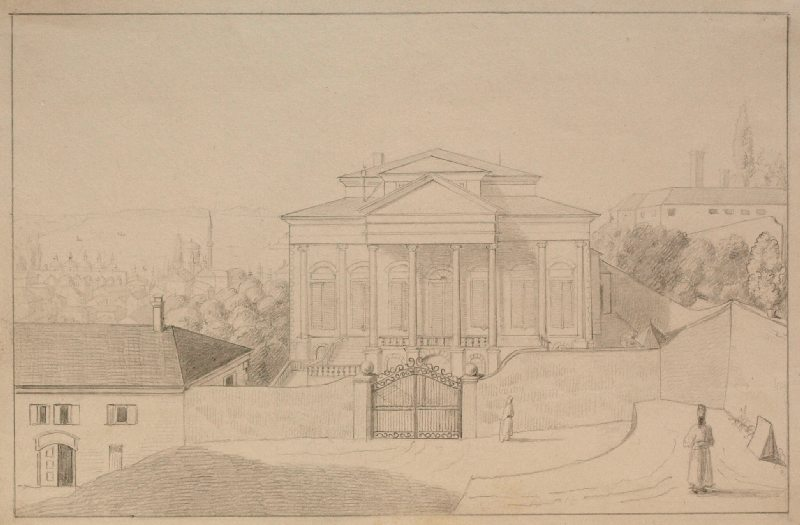
The former embassy of the Republic of Venice in Constantinople, 1840

The European consuls in the Ottoman Empire began as informal relationships between merchants residing in the Empire and the Sultan. The relationships were defined by the ahdname granted by the Sultan which would stipulate the religious freedom and exemption from the taxes that non-Muslim subjects had to pay. The religious implications of these relationships diminished over time as the commercial aspects took over.

The Italian city states initially appointed resident ambassadors to other Italian states to create some peace between the conflicting powers. From the twelfth-century onward the merchants from the Italian city states would organize and select a consul to represent them in the Ottoman Empire, but soon after these consuls were more formally chosen by the government. By the fifteenth-century other Western European nations adopted similar practices and diplomacy has been characterized as a Western European phenomenon ever since. Another cause of the consular phenomena was the military hardening of borders which meant that Europeans could not infiltrate another area by force so they relied on economic and commercial ties to gain entry. In the early stages of these consular relationships the Ottomans' did not reciprocate in sending consuls to European capitals, partly because European Christians were less welcoming towards Muslims than Muslims were towards Christians.

The consuls and the trading communities, of which they were in charge, had wide implications for European-Ottoman relationships. Since consuls and merchants would remain in Istanbul (and other Ottoman cities) for longer periods of time, they would return home with a more accurate depiction of the Ottoman culture than the earlier negative depiction. Reporting home with political news was one of the consul's primary responsibilities which also helped in re-shaping the opinions of the Ottoman's held by Europeans. A new respect–not necessarily for Ottoman people, but for the Ottoman accomplishments—eventually broke the old barriers and Ottomans appointed representatives to European states.

== Venetian consuls ==
The Venetians appointed principal consuls to important commercial centers like Aleppo and Alexandria because this was where there was a large nation of their merchants. They also appointed vice-consuls to less important areas where they had less commercial interest. The principal consuls were in contact with their home country's authorities, while the vice-consuls had a more informal position. The consuls were Venetian nobility and appointed on a three-year contract which for the most part was strongly adhered to. Also, it was important that they did not have commercial interests or have ties to the merchant community in the area to which they were appointed, but frequently that was not observed in practice. The consuls would have a fixed salary and no other means of income. The Venetian consul would have a council of twelve to assist him and would be responsible for approving all expenditures of the nation's treasury. Also in the event of the consuls death, the council would appoint a vice-consul until a new consul could be sent from Venice. Through the sixteenth and seventeenth-centuries the Venetians practiced a policy of neutrality which was only possible through their strong diplomatic corps—chiefly the bailo (who acted as consul and ambassador). The bailo needed personal skills that would allow him to befriend high ranking Ottoman officials in order to ensure Venetian interests. One of the main tasks of the bailo was to collect information on the Ottomans’ politics and social life and report back to the Venetian senate regularly. Second in importance was his consular role of promoting and protecting Venetian interests. The bailo was in charge of all Venetians in the Ottoman territory, but he would appoint consuls and vice consuls where he thought it was necessary.

== French consuls ==
The French appear to have kept most intact the medieval tradition of the consul—a representative of the nation of merchants. When the state assumed control of the consuls in the later sixteenth century they diminished the privileges of the nation of merchants. The primary function became financial. However, the state then lost control again over the consuls and the position became a personal one that could be succeeded by an heir. The French consuls did not have fixed incomes like the Venetians, which caused them to "farm" the position out to someone able to pay a higher price for it. This meant that the nation of merchants was potentially represented by someone who was unqualified. The consul had no legal right to collect supplementary taxes. However a voluntary agreement could be reached, but if one member of the French nation refused to pay or lodged a complaint against the consul it would sabotage the agreement. The French had success in the Ottoman Empire notably through their political and diplomatic initiatives rather than their commercial ones. The consuls were responsible for promoting French trade in the Levant through persuasion (gifts, donations, favours etc..) The French consuls were not allowed to participate in trade and commerce themselves, but they were to report political and economic information back to the French government. However, the consulate was frequently headed by corrupt consuls and many of them did engage in commerce.

== Dutch consuls ==
Before the Dutch had their own consuls in the Levant, they traded under the French Capitulations of 1569 until they sent Cornelius Haga as a Consul to Istanbul in 1611. The States-General was responsible for appointing the consul, but the Levant merchants in these cases were closely consulted. The poor payment system for the consuls disrupted the potential successes of the relationship between consul and merchant community. The merchants requested changing to the Venetian fixed salary payment, but the States-General went against their wishes and tried to find other means of income. This posed problems for the Dutch consuls, and there are many reports of cases where consuls exerted their authority over the nations members who did not want to pay consulate and embassy dues. Despite internal struggle within the Dutch nation, it had a good relationship with the Ottomans and in 1804 Sultan Selin III (1789–1807) appointed the first resident representative to Amsterdam.

== English consuls ==
The English consuls were appointed by and affiliated with the Levant Company. The consuls were not in any way a representative for the Crown, but merely representing the interests of the Company. It is interesting that if any issues arose with the Ottoman officials, the nation of merchants would meet with the consul to reach a decision on what to do and the company would never interfere in the decisions of the nation. It was not until 1605 that the Company gained the formal right to appoint consuls and vice consuls which were solely concerned with the nation of merchants who were members of the Company. If a consul was absent or died the vice consul would remain in charge until a new consul could be sent. England had the simplest hierarchy when it came to consular representation because the Company was in charge of the nation and consuls below, whereas the Crown used other representation abroad.

== See also ==
- Dragoman

== Sources ==
- Brewer, M. Jonah (2002), Gold, Frankincense, and Myrh: French Consuls and Commercial Diplomacy in the Ottoman Levant, 1660–1699. Unpublished PhD Dissertation, Georgetown University.
- De Groot, Alexander (1978), The Ottoman Empire and the Dutch Republic: a History of the Earliest Diplomatic Relations, 1610–1630, Leiden: Nederlands Historisch-Archaeologisch Instituut Leiden/Istanbul, ISBN 978-90-6258-043-9
- Dursteler, Eric R. (2001), "The Bailo in Constantinople: Crisis and Career in Venice's Early Modern Diplomatic Corps", Mediterranean Historical Review, 16 (2): 1–30, doi:10.1080/714004583, ISSN 0951-8967, S2CID 159980567
- Eldem, Edhem (1999), French Trade in Istanbul in the Eighteenth Century, Boston: Brill Academic Publishers, ISBN 978-90-04-11353-4
- Goffman, Daniel; Aksan, Virginia H. (2007), "Negotiation With the Renaissance State: The Ottoman Empire and the New Diplomacy", The Early Modern Ottomans: Remapping the Empire, Cambridge: Cambridge University Press, pp. 61–74, ISBN 978-0-521-81764-6
- Goffman, Daniel (2002), The Ottoman Empire and Early Modern Europe, New York: Cambridge University Press, ISBN 978-0-521-45280-9
- Mattingly, Garrett (1963), Renaissance Diplomacy, The Bedford Historical Series, London: Cape, OCLC 270845938
- Steensgaard, Neils (1967), "Consuls and Nations in the Levant From 1570 to 1650", The Scandinavian Economic History Review, 15 (1): 13–55, doi:10.1080/03585522.1967.10414351, ISSN 0358-5522
