= Catherine Zaccaria =

Despoina of Morea - (after 1453) Eastern Roman Empress consort

Catherine Asenina Zaccaria

Despoina of Morea
- Reign: 1430–1460

Byzantine Empress consort
- Reign: 1453–1462
- Died: 1462; Corfu, Venice
- Spouse: Thomas Palaiologos
- Issue: Helena Palaiologina; Zoe Palaiologina; Andreas Palaiologos; Manuel Palaiologos
- House: Zaccaria
- Father: Centurione II Zaccaria
- Mother: Palaiologina Asenina
- Religion: Greek Orthodox

Catherine Asenina Zaccaria or Catherine Palaiologina (Medieval Greek: Αἰκατερίνα Παλαιολογίνα; died 26 August 1462) was the daughter of the Prince of Achaea, Centurione II Zaccaria and a Byzantine lady hailing from the prestigious houses of Asen-Palaiologos and the house of Tzamblakon. In September 1429 she was betrothed to the Byzantine Despot of the Morea Thomas Palaiologos, and married him in January 1430 at Mystras.

Sphrantzes in his Short History mentions a Kydonides Tzamblakon next to Thomas Palaiologos, that he calls the most beloved uncle of his wife. In 1459, this man aroused Thomas in a war against his brother Demetrios Palaiologos. Kydonides Tzamblakon was married to a sister of Catherine's mother. In Kalavryta there survives a palace known in the region as "the palace of Palaiologina," that according to tradition, was given as a personal gift by Constantine Palaiologos to his sister-in-law Catherine, and as such, received its name from her.

Catherine remained in the Morea as Thomas' consort until the Ottoman conquest in 1460, after which she fled with her husband and children to the Venetian-held island of Corfu. George Sphrantzes acted as a servant of Catherine's household for some time. Eleni Tzamblakina, the wife of Sphrantzes, was a second cousin of Catherine, from the side of her Asenina-Palaiologina mother. She died on 26 August 1462 and was buried in the Monastery of Jason and Sosipatros. The erudite and later professor of the Greek language Hermonymos Georgios wrote a eulogy for Catherine. Hermonymos was close to the family of Thomas. He said that he wrote the epitaph for Catherine not out of duty, but out of his deep admiration for her. In it he laments her death and praises her as "a divine empress" and "the most modest and bravest of women".

== Family ==
By her marriage with Thomas, she had four children, the sons Andreas and Manuel and the daughters Helena (wife of Lazar Branković of Serbia) and Zoe (wife of Ivan III of Russia).
