= Maria Castriota =

Maria Castriota Maria Kastriota
- Coat of arms of the Kastrioti family
- Died: 1560
- Occupation: Artist
- Known for: Granddaughter of Albanian National Hero, Skanderbeg
- Spouse: Carlo Minutolo
- Parents: Gjon Kastrioti II (father); Jerina Branković (wife of Gjon Kastrioti II) (mother)
- Family: Kastrioti

Maria Castriota (died 1560) (Albanian: Maria Kastriota) was the daughter of the Albanian nobleman Gjon Kastrioti II, who was the son of Skanderbeg, his wife Jerina Branković. She married Carlo Minutolo and she dedicated her life to art. She also had three siblings, Giorgio Castriota (1540), Costantino Castriota (1477–1500), and Ferdinand Castriota (1561).

== Family tree ==
Ancestors of Maria Castriota

8. Gjon Kastrioti
4. Gjergj Kastrioti
9. Voisava Kastrioti
2. Gjon Kastrioti II
10. Gjergj Arianiti
5. Donika Kastrioti
11. Maria Muzaka
1. Maria Castriota
12. Đurađ Branković
6. Lazar Branković
13. Irene Kantakouzene
3. Jerina Branković
14. Thomas Palaiologos
7. Helena Palaiologina
15. Catherine Zaccaria

== See also ==
- House of Kastrioti
