= Erina Castriota =

16th century Albanian princess

Erina Castriota Erina Kastrioti
- Princess of Bisignano; Duchess of San Pietro; Countess of Soleto
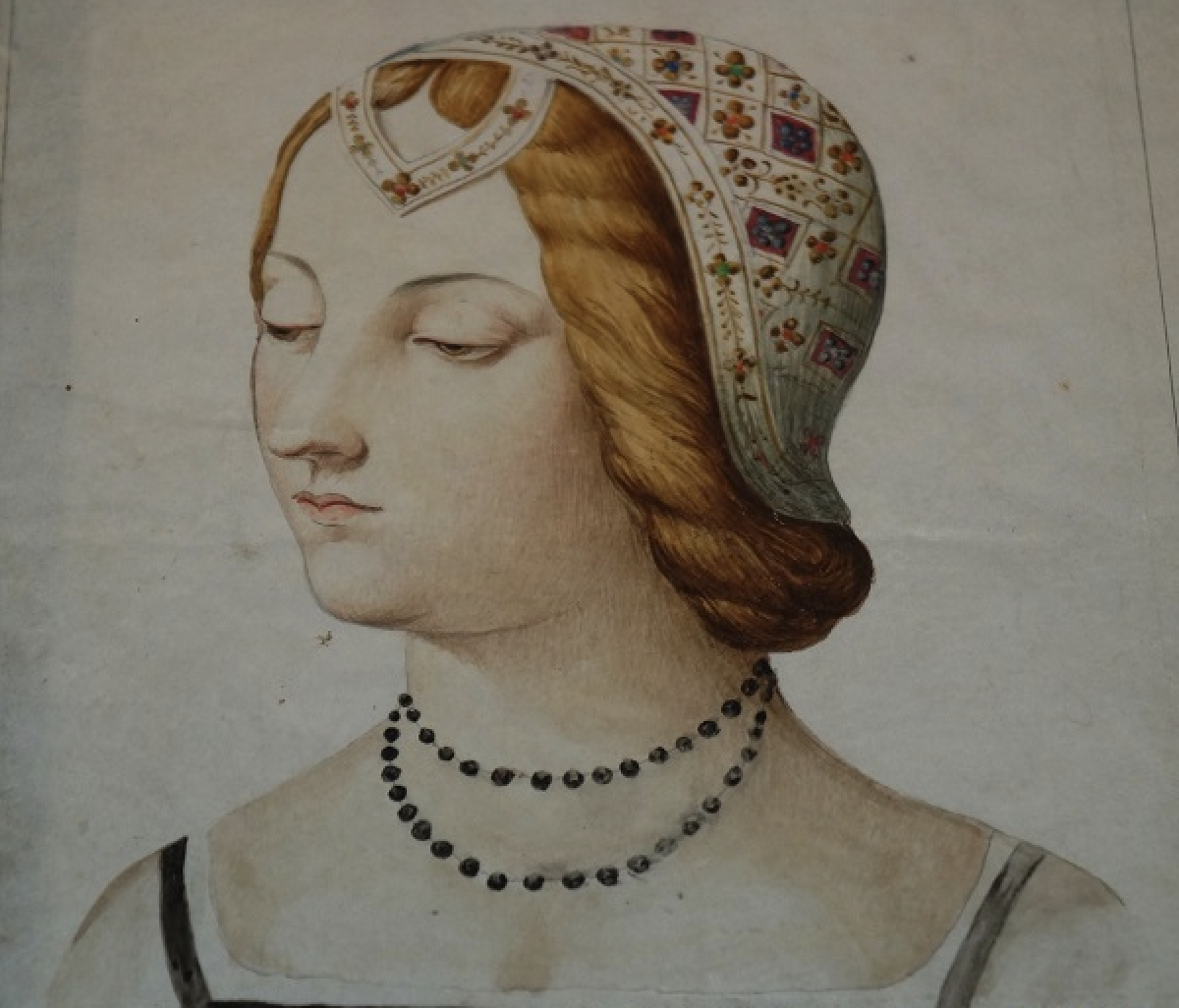
- Portrait of Erina Castriota

Princess consort of Bisignano
- Tenure: 1539-1565
- Predecessor: Eleonora Todeschini Piccolomini
- Successor: Isabella della Rovere

Duchess of San Pietro
- Tenure: 1530-1565
- Predecessor: Ferdinand Castriota
- Successor: Nicolò Bernardino Sanseverino

Countess of Soleto
- Tenure: 1530-1565
- Predecessor: Ferdinand Castriota
- Successor: Nicolò Bernardino Sanseverino
- Born: 1528
- Died: September 15, 1565 (aged 36–37); Morano Calabro
- Spouse: Pietro Antonio Sanseverino
- Issue: Nicolò Bernardino Sanseverino; Vittoria Sanseverino
- Dynasty: Kastrioti (by birth); Sanseverino (by marriage)
- Father: Ferdinand Castriota
- Mother: Andreana Acquaviva d'Aragona
- Religion: Roman Catholic

Erina Castriota (Albanian: Erina Kastrioti), also known as Irina Castriota, was an Albanian princess from the House of Kastrioti. She was the 3rd Duchess of San Pietro in Galatina, 3rd Countess of Soleto and Princess of Bisignano.

== Life ==
Erina Castriota was born into the House of Kastrioti, she was the daughter of Ferdinand Castriota and Andreana Acquaviva d'Aragona. Not much is known about her early life. Erina Castriota inherited her father's confiscated fiefs, including the Duchy of San Pietro in Galatina and the County of Soleto, following Ferdinand's exclusion from amnesty by Charles V after the Peace of Cambrai in 1530. This exclusion led to the confiscation of Ferdinand's lands. As part of her dowry when marrying Pietro Antonio Sanseverino, Erina brought these fiefs, a transfer recognized by Charles V. The official donation document referred to her as the "only-begotten legitimate and natural daughter," and outlined a dowry of twenty-five thousand ducats, with a portion payable at her marriage and the remainder upon Ferdinand's death, contingent on him having no male heirs. Scholars debate whether Ferdinand had male children. Some, like Dufresne, assert that all his sons died without heirs, while others, such as Zazzera, believe Erina was the only child from his marriage to Adriana Acquaviva. Erina's inheritance was likely due to her father's felony and the supposed death of any brothers without issue.

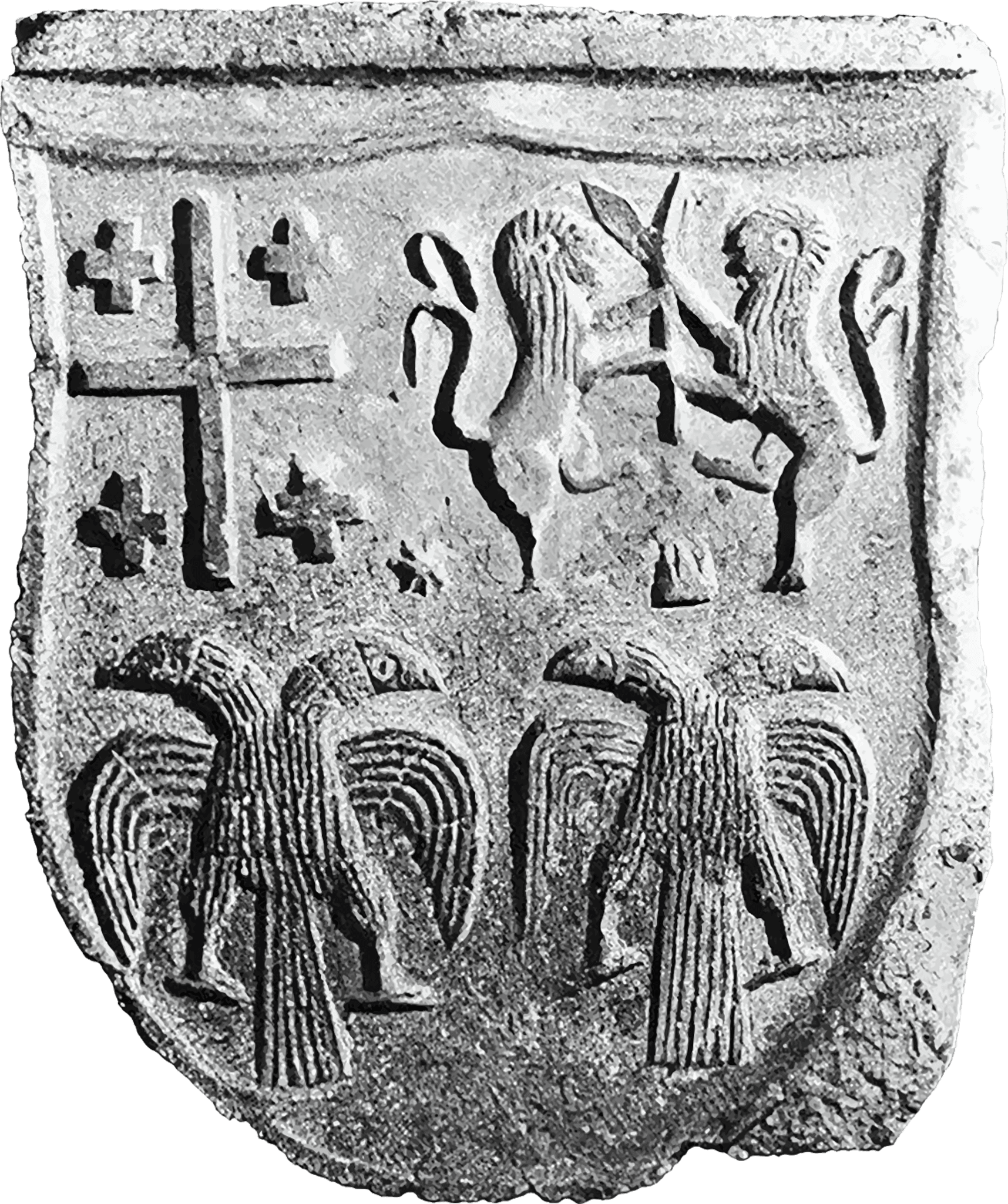
Coat of arms of Erina. Located in the halls of the Ducal Palace of Tricarico. It's a Modified version of her father and grandfather's coat of arms.

In 1539, Erina Castriota married Pietro Antonio Sanseverino of the House of Sanseverino, becoming his second wife and the Princess consort of Bisignano. She brought 25,000 Ducats and the fiefs she inherited from her father as her dowry for her husband.

Erina died in Morano Calabro on September 15, 1565, and was buried there.

== Issue ==
Erina married Pietro Antonio Sanseverino. The pair had two children:

- Nicolò Berardino Sanseverino, (1541–1606) 5th Prince of Bisignano, 10th and last Count of Tricarico married Isabella della Rovere Princess of Urbino in 1565.
- Vittoria Sanseverino, (Before 1559–1614) married Ferrante of Capua, Duke of Termoli.

== Family tree ==
Ancestors of Erina Castriota

8. Gjergj Kastrioti
4. Gjon Kastrioti II
9. Donika Kastrioti
2. Ferdinand Castriota
10. Lazar Branković
5. Jerina Branković
11. Helena Palaiologina
1. Erina Castriota
12. Giulio Antonio Acquaviva
6. Belisario Acquaviva
13. Caterina Orsini del Balzo
3. Andreana Acquaviva d'Aragona
14. Gerolamo Sanseverino
7. Sveva Sanseverino
15. Vannella Gaetani dell'Aquila d'Aragona

== See also ==
- House of Kastrioti

== Bibliography ==
- Biscaglia, Carmela (2003). Il Liber iurium della città di Tricarico: Edizione [The Liber iurium of the city of Tricarico: Edition] (in Italian). M. Congedo.
- Cocco, Giuseppe (2022). Viaggio in Molise con Lentezza Viaggi in Italia in compagnia dei Travelogue dei ViaggiAutori del Grand Tour [Travel to Molise slowly Trips to Italy in the company of the Travelogues of the Travel Authors of the Grand Tour] (in Italian). Penisolabella.
- Dennistoun, James (1851). Memoirs of the Dukes of Urbino, Illustrating the Arms, Arts, and Literature of Italy, from 1440 to 1630 Volume 3. Longman, Brown, Green, and Longmans.
- Hopf, Karl (1873). Chroniques greco-romanes inedites ou peu connues [Unpublished or little-known Greco-Roman chronicles] (in French). Weidmann.
- Larson, Keith Austin (1985). The Unaccompanied Madrigal in Naples from 1536 to 1654 Part 1. Harvard University. ISBN 978-3-4470-4783-8.
- Mansueto, Donato; Calogero, Elena Laura (2007). The Italian Emblem A Collection of Essays. Glasgow Emblem Studies. ISBN 978-0-8526-1832-5.
- Martuscelli, Domenico (1818). Biografia degli Uomini Illustri del Regno di Napoli Decorati con i rispettivi ritratti · Volume 5. Presso Nicola Gervasi [Biography of the Illustrious Men of the Kingdom of Naples Decorated with their respective portraits · Volume 5. At Nicola Gervasi] (in Italian).
- Padiglione, Carlo (1879). Di Giorgio Castriota Scanderbech e de' suoi discendenti [By Giorgio Castriota Scanderbech and his descendants] (in Italian). Stab. Tipografico del Cav. Francesco Giannini.
- University of California (1980). Studi meridionali Volumes 13-14 [Southern Studies Volumes 13-14] (in Italian). Casa editrice studi meridionali.
