= Helena of Serbia =

Helen, Helena or Jelena of Serbia (Serbian: Јелена) may refer to the following Serbian consorts:

- Helena of Serbia, Queen of Hungary (Jelena Vukanović), Queen consort of Hungary; Béla II of Hungary (1131–1141)
- Saint Helena of Serbia (Jelena Anžujska), Queen consort of Serbia; Stephen Uroš I of Serbia (1245–1276)
- Helena Doukaina Angelina, Queen consort of Serbia; Stefan Uroš II Milutin (1273–1284)
- Helena of Bulgaria, Empress of Serbia (Jelena), Empress consort of Serbia; Stephen Uroš IV Dušan of Serbia (1332–1355)
- Helena of Serbia, Princess of Zeta (Jelena), Princes consort of Zeta; Đurađ II Balšić of Zeta (1385–1403)
- Helena Gattilusio, Despotitsa consort of Serbia; Stefan Lazarević (1405–1427)
- Helena Palaiologina of Morea, Despotitsa consort of Serbia; Lazar Branković (1456–1458)
- Maria of Serbia, Queen of Bosnia (christened Jelena), Queen consort of Bosnia; Stephen Tomašević (1461–1463)
- Princess Helena of Serbia (Jelena Karađorđević), Princess consort of Russia; Prince John Constantinovich of Russia (lived 1886–1918)
- Helena Dragaš of the House of Dejanović

== See also ==
- Helena of Bulgaria (disambiguation)
- Anna of Serbia (disambiguation)
- Maria of Serbia (disambiguation)
- Queen Jelena (disambiguation)
