= Castriota =

Castriota is a surname. Notable people with the surname include:

- Costantino Castriota (1477–1500), Albanian nobleman
- Jason Castriota, American automobile designer
- Samuel Castriota (1885–1932), Argentine musician

== See also ==
- Candidula castriota, species of snail
- House of Kastrioti, noble family
- Kastriot (disambiguation)
