= Alfonso Castriota =

15th century Albanian nobleman

Alfonso Castriota Alfonso Kastriota
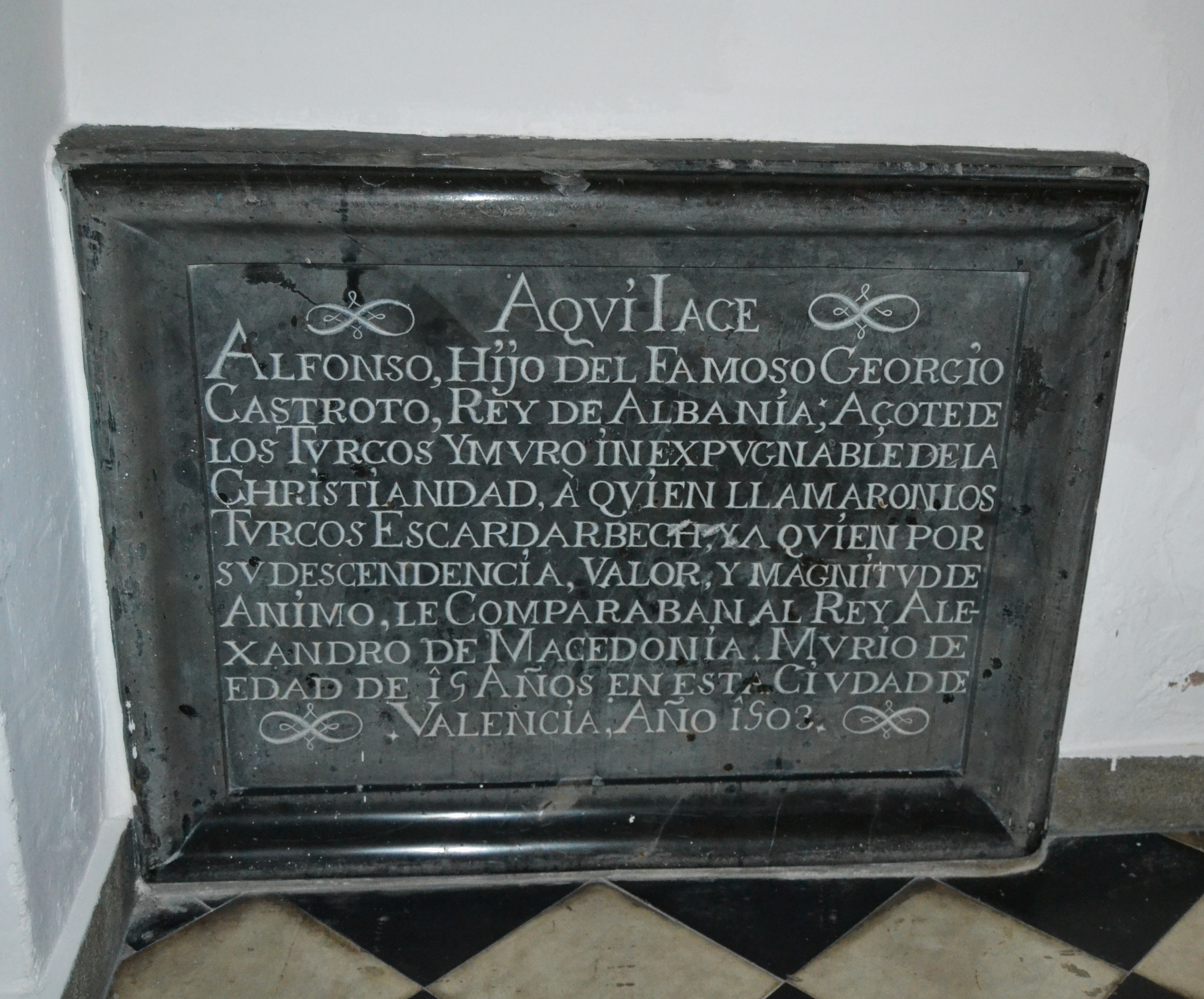
- The epitaph of Alfonso Castriota in the Royal Monastery of the Holy Trinity in Valencia
- Born: 1488
- Died: 1503 (Aged 15); Valencia, Kingdom of Valencia
- Buried: Royal Monastery of the Holy Trinity
- Noble family: Kastrioti
- Father: Gjon Kastrioti II
- Mother: Jerina Branković

Alfonso Castriota (Albanian: Alfonso Kastriota), also known as Don Alonso Castrioto, was an Albanian nobleman from the House of Kastrioti.

== Life ==
Alfonso Castriota was born in 1488 into the House of Kastrioti, he was the youngest son of Gjon Kastrioti II and Jerina Branković. He was the grandson of the Albanian national hero, Skanderbeg, through his father, and the great-grandson of Thomas Palaiologos through his mother. Details about his early life remain scarce.

After the death of his grandfather Skanderbeg in 1468, his family moved to Naples, where his father became the Duke of San Pietro in Galatina. Donika Kastrioti, invited and protected by Frederick I of Aragon, traveled to Spain in 1501 or 1502, along with Jerina Branković, her daughter-in-law and Alfonso’s mother, and an escort of twenty knights. This relocation was prompted by the deteriorating political situation in Italy, particularly the advancing French armies and the shifting power dynamics in Naples and the surrounding regions. Alfonso, who was around fifteen years old at the time, found himself in Valencia, far from his Albanian homeland, facing a future that was heavily influenced by the political upheaval in Europe.

== Death ==
Alfonso Castriota tragically died in 1503 at the age of fifteen. The circumstances surrounding his death remain somewhat unclear, with several accounts suggesting different causes. According to one version, he was accidentally hit by a stone while crossing a bridge near the Royal Monastery of the Holy Trinity. Another account suggests he suffered a horse accident, while yet another claims he was involved in a duel. This text follows a report indicating that he was struck by a stone while attempting to mediate a brawl between individuals, or perhaps received a fatal stab wound while trying to intervene in a dispute between two men. These conflicting reports reflect the uncertainty surrounding the tragic demise of Alfonso Castriota, emphasizing the chaotic and perilous environment he lived in during his time in Spain.

Alfonso Castriota was buried in the Royal Monastery of the Holy Trinity in Valencia, Spain, in 1503. His epitaph on the grave reads: "Here lies Alfonso, son of the famous Georgio Castroto, King of Albania, scourge of the Turks and impregnable wall of Christendom, whom the Turks called Escardarbech, and who was compared to King Alexander of Macedon due to his lineage, courage and magnitude of spirit. He died at the age of 15 in this city of Valencia, in the year 1503".

Donika Kastrioti, Alfonso's grandmother, was buried in the same monastery between 1505 and 1506. The tomb is described as being adorned with two angels, with a central marble slab bearing the two-headed eagle, the emblem of the Albanian monarchy, and above it, the inscription: "The Most Holy Lady, the Patroness of Albania." According to historian Paolo Petta, Donika served as a lady-in-waiting and personal advisor to Spanish Queen Isabel of Castile, a position she held from 1478 to 1496. Her burial place in the Monastery of the Holy Trinity in Valencia reflects her significant role and legacy, combining her personal nobility with the broader Albanian national identity. An engraving from 1596 by Johann Theodor de Bry also depicts her, with her name inscribed in Latin: "Donika, Skanderbeg's wife," capturing her enduring influence and the respect she commanded as a mother, noble wife, and patron of Albania.

== Family tree ==
Ancestors of Alfonso Castriota

8. Gjon Kastrioti
4. Gjergj Kastrioti
9. Voisava Kastrioti
2. Gjon Kastrioti II
10. Gjergj Arianiti
5. Donika Kastrioti
11. Maria Muzaka
1. Alfonso Castriota
12. Đurađ Branković
6. Lazar Branković
13. Irene Kantakouzene
3. Jerina Branković
14. Thomas Palaiologos
7. Helena Palaiologina
15. Catherine Zaccaria

== See also ==
- House of Kastrioti

== Bibliography ==
- García, Javier Becerra; Guede, José Ramón Sarmiento; Gómez, Raquel Pinilla (2023). El júbilo de la palabra [The joy of the word] (in Spanish). Editorial Dykinson, S.L. ISBN 978-8-4117-0854-8.
- Goerlich, Daniel Benito (2021). La estirpe albanesa de la Virgen del Refugio de la Trinidad sobre un viejo icono casi olvidado [The Albanian lineage of Our Lady of Refuge of the Trinity on an almost forgotten old icon] (in Spanish). University of Valencia.
