= Ferdinand Castriota =

16th century Albanian nobleman

Ferdinand Castriota Ferdinand Kastrioti
- Duke of San Pietro; Count of Soleto
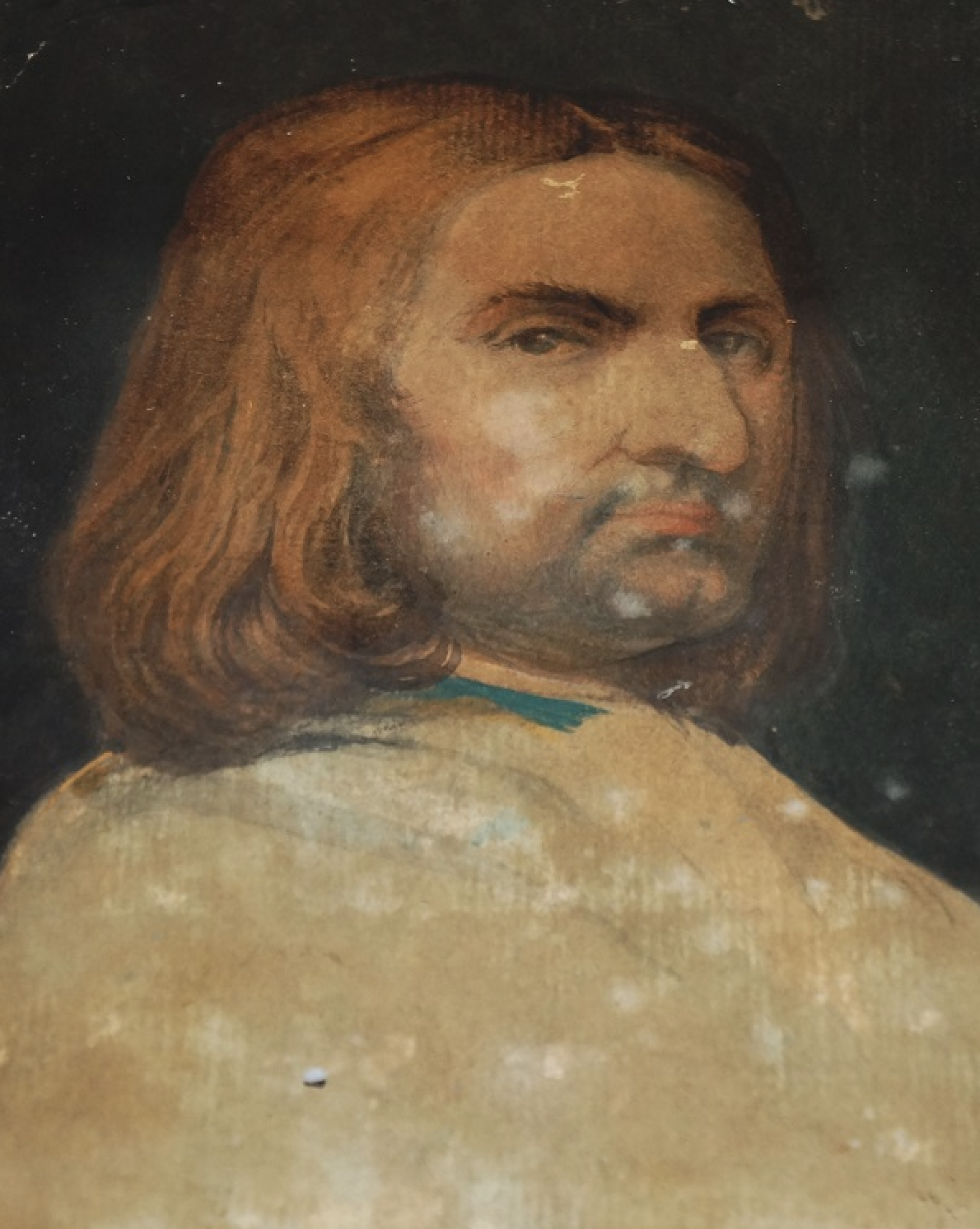
- Portrait of Ferdinand Castriota

Duke of San Pietro
- Reign: 1514-1530
- Predecessor: Gjon Kastrioti II
- Successor: Erina Castriota
- Died: 1561
- Noble family: Kastrioti
- Spouse: Andreana Acquaviva d'Aragona
- Issue: Erina Castriota; Federico Castriota; Pardo Castriota; Achille Castriota; Alfonso Castriota; Paolo Castriota; Giovanni Castriota; Ferrante Castriota
- Father: Gjon Kastrioti II
- Mother: Jerina Branković

Ferdinand Castriota (Albanian: Ferdinand Kastrioti), also known as Ferrante, was an Albanian nobleman from the House of Kastrioti. He was the 2nd Duke of San Pietro in Galatina and 2nd Count of Soleto.

== Life ==
Ferdinand Castriota was born into the House of Kastrioti, he was the son of Gjon Kastrioti II and Jerina Branković. He was the grandson of the Albanian national hero Skanderbeg on his father's side. As well as the great-grandson of Thomas Palaiologos on his mother's side. Not much is known about his early life. But he succeeded his father as Duke of San Pietro and Count of Soleto. Ferdinand Castriota, whose exact year of marriage remains unknown, married Andreana Acquaviva d'Aragona of Nardò. Ferdinand, fought under General Lotrecco against Charles V, whose army was commanded by Philibert of Chalon in the War of the League of Cognac. Following the conflict, Ferdinand's name appeared among those excluded from the amnesty that Charles V proclaimed after the Peace of Cambrai on April 28, 1530. As a result of this exclusion, his fiefs, including the Duchy of San Pietro in Galatina and the County of Soleto, were confiscated. His daughter, Erina, inherited these fiefs and later brought them as dowry upon marrying Pier Antonio Sanseverino.

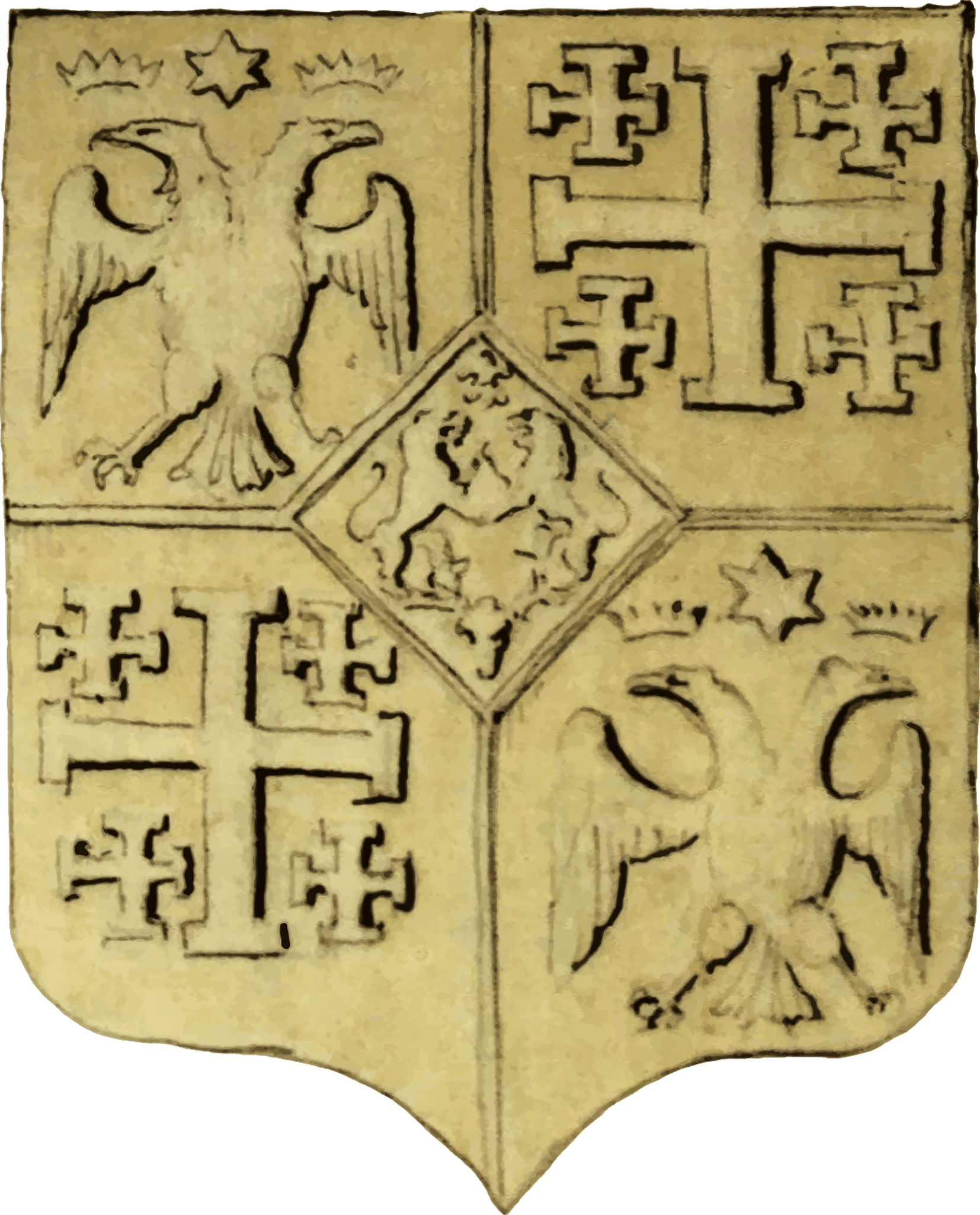
Coat of arms of Ferdinand, identical to that of his father, Gjon

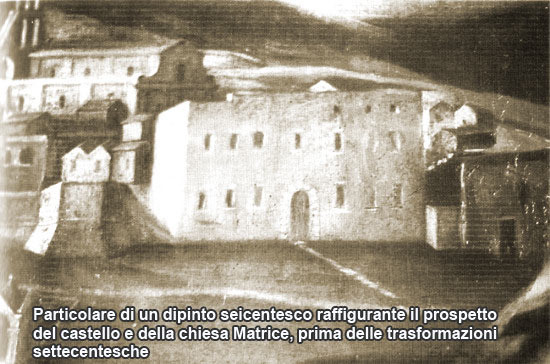
16th century painting of Galatina Palace the former home of the Castriota family

== Debate Over Heirs and Inheritance ==
Following this loss of his fiefs, his only daughter, Erina, inherited the fiefs and was part of her dowry upon marrying Pier Antonio Sanseverino. This transfer was recognized by Charles V, who referred to Erina as the "only-begotten legitimate and natural daughter" in the donation document. The act stipulated a dowry of twenty-five thousand ducats, with three thousand paid at her marriage and the remaining twenty-two thousand due after Ferdinand's death if he had no male heirs. There is ongoing debate regarding whether Ferrante had male children, with Dufresne asserting that all his sons died without heirs and Monardo suggesting that the male line had died out. Conversely, some scholars, like Zazzera, argue that Erina was Ferrante's only child with Andreana Acquaviva. Erina's inheritance of Ferrante's estates is attributed to the felony of her father and the supposed death of her brothers without heirs. When Erina died in 1565, it implied that the direct line of the Castriota family as feudatories of S. Pier in Galatina became extinct, although the broader Castriota lineage persisted. Historical records indicate that Achille Castriota Scanderbech, a descendant of Ferdinand, maintained ties to the family legacy, underscoring the complexities of inheritance and lineage within the Castriota family.

== Issue ==
Ferdinand married Andreana Acquaviva d'Aragona of Nardò. The pair had one child:

- Erina Castriota, (1528–1565) Duchess of San Pietro and Countess of Soleto married Pietro Antonio Sanseverino in 1539 and became Princess Consort of Bisignano.

Ferdinand possibly had other illegitimate children, as Erina was recognized as his only legitimate child and inherited her father's lands. Furthermore, it is suggested that Ferdinand's sons may not have had descendants, thereby solidifying Erina's position as the sole heir. Some historians debate whether Ferdinand had additional children, but Erina's status as the sole heir marks the end of the direct male line of the Castriota family as feudatories of San Pietro in Galatina and Soleto.

- Achille Castriota
- Federico Castriota
- Alfonso Castriota
- Paolo Castriota
- Pardo Castriota
- Giovanni Castriota
- Ferrante Castriota

== Family tree ==
Ancestors of Ferdinand Castriota

8. Gjon Kastrioti
4. Gjergj Kastrioti
9. Voisava Kastrioti
2. Gjon Kastrioti II
10. Gjergj Arianiti
5. Donika Kastrioti
11. Maria Muzaka
1. Ferdinand Castriota
12. Đurađ Branković
6. Lazar Branković
13. Irene Kantakouzene
3. Jerina Branković
14. Thomas Palaiologos
7. Helena Palaiologina
15. Catherine Zaccaria

== See also ==
- House of Kastrioti

== Bibliography ==
- Elsie, Robert (2003). Early Albania A Reader of Historical Texts, 11th-17th Centuries. Harrassowitz. ISBN 978-3-4470-4783-8.
- Gegaj, Athanase (1937). L'Albanie et l'invasion turque au XVe siècle [Albania and the Turkish invasion in the 15th century] (in French). Bureaux du Recueil, Bibliothèque de l'Universite. ISBN 978-0-5989-3599-1.
- Hopf, Karl (1873). Chroniques greco-romanes inedites ou peu connues. Weidmann.* Mansueto, Donato; Calogero, Elena Laura (2007). The Italian Emblem A Collection of Essays. Glasgow Emblem Studies. ISBN 978-0-8526-1832-5.
- Padiglione, Carlo (1879). Di Giorgio Castriota Scanderbech e de' suoi discendenti [By Giorgio Castriota Scanderbech and his descendants] (in Italian). Stab. Tipografico del Cav. Francesco Giannini.
