= Milica Branković =

Serbian princess

Milica Branković (Serbian Cyrillic: Милица Бранковић, d. 1464) was a Serbian princess and the first wife of Leonardo III Tocco, whom she married on 1 May 1463. She was a daughter of despot Lazar Branković of Serbia and Helena Palaiologina. Milica died in childbirth in 1464, while giving birth to Carlo III Tocco. Carlo III Tocco succeeded his father as titular ruler of Epirus (Arta) and Zakynthos. Her siblings were Maria, the wife of King Stephen Tomašević of Bosnia, and Jerina, the wife of Gjon Kastrioti II.

== Ancestry ==
Ancestors of Milica Branković

16. Branko Mladenović
8. Vuk Branković
4. Đurađ I Branković
18. Lazar Hrebeljanović
9. Maria Lazarević
19. Milica Nemanjić
2. Lazar Branković
5. Eirene Kantakouzene
1. Milica
24. John V Palaiologos
12. Manuel II Palaiologos
25. Helena Kantakouzene
6. Thomas Palaiologos
26. Constantine Dragaš
13. Helena Dragaš
27. Unnamed first wife
3. Helena Palaiologina
28. Andronikos Asen Zaccaria
14. Centurione II Zaccaria
29. Catherine Le Maure
7. Catherine Zaccaria
15. Asenina Palaiologina

== Sources ==
- Fine, John Van Antwerp Jr. (1994) [1987]. The Late Medieval Balkans: A Critical Survey from the Late Twelfth Century to the Ottoman Conquest. Ann Arbor, Michigan: University of Michigan Press. ISBN 0472082604.
- Babinger, Franz (1978). Hickman, William C. (ed.). Mehmed the Conqueror and His Time. Translated by Manheim, Ralph. Princeton University Press. ISBN 9780691099002.
- Zečević, Nada (2014). The Tocco of the Greek Realm: Nobility, Power and Migration in Latin Greece (14th-15th centuries). Belgrade: Makart. ISBN 9788691944100.
