= Queen Jelena =

Queen Jelena (Serbian: Јелена) may refer to:

- Helen of Zadar (also known as Helen the Glorious or Jelena Slavna), Queen consort of Kingdom of Croatia; Michael Krešimir II 946-969, later (Queen dowager 969-976)
- Helena of Serbia, Queen of Hungary (Jelena Urošević Vukanović), Queen consort of Hungary; Béla II of Hungary (1131–1141)
- Queen Helen of Anjou (Hélène d'Anjou), Queen consort of Serbia; Stephen Uroš I of Serbia (1245–1276)
- Helena Doukaina, Queen consort of Serbia; Stefan Uroš II Milutin (1273–1284)
- Helena of Bulgaria (Elena), Empress consort of Serbia; Stephen Uroš IV Dušan of Serbia (1332–1355)
- Jelena Gruba (Helena), Queen regnant of Bosnia (1395-1398); Stephen Dabiša (1391-1395).
- Helena Gattilusio, Despotess consort of Serbia; Stefan Lazarević (1405–1427)
- Helena Palaiologina of Morea, Despotess consort of Serbia; Lazar Branković (1456–1458)
- Maria of Serbia, Queen of Bosnia (Jelena), Queen consort of Bosnia; Stephen Tomašević (1461–1463)
- Princess Helen of Serbia (Jelena Karađorđević), Princess consort of Russia; Prince John Constantinovich of Russia (lived 1886–1918)
- Elena of Montenegro, Queen consort of Italy; Victor Emmanuel III (1900-1946)

== See also ==
- Grand Order of Queen Jelena
- Helena of Serbia (disambiguation)
