= Anna of Serbia =

Anna of Serbia (Serbian: Ana/Ана) may refer to:

- Anna (fl. 1110–1115), Grand Princess consort of Serbia, wife of Uroš I (r. 1112–1145)
- Anna–Anastasia (d. 1200), Grand Princess consort of Serbia; Stefan Nemanja (r. 1166–1196)
- Anna Dandolo (d. 1264), Queen consort of Serbia; Stefan Nemanjić (r. 1196–1228)
- Anna Angelina Komnene Doukaina (fl. 1216–1234), Queen consort of Serbia; Stefan Radoslav (r. 1228–1233)
- Anna Terter (fl. 1282–1304), Queen consort of Serbia; Stefan Milutin (r. 1284–1299)
- Anna–Neda (fl. 1323–1357), Empress consort of Bulgaria; Michael Shishman (r. 1323–1330)
- Anna–Anka (fl. 1360), Empress consort of Serbia; Stefan Uroš V (r. 1355–1371)
- Anna Jakšić, Serbian Princess of the Jakšić noble family; Prince Vasili Lvovich Glinsky
- Anna Branković (d. 1578), Serbian Princess of the Branković dynasty; Fiodor Sanguszko of Volhynia

== See also ==
- Helena of Serbia (disambiguation)
- Maria of Serbia (disambiguation)
