= Albanian Rebellion of 1481–1484 =

Uprising against the Ottoman Empire

Albanian Rebellion of 1481–1484 Rebelimi Shqiptar
- Part of the Ottoman wars in Europe
Date	1481–1484 (3 years)
Location	Ottoman Albania
Result	Ottoman victory

Belligerents
Principality of Kastrioti; Supported by: Kingdom of Naples	Ottoman Empire

Commanders and leaders
Gjon Kastrioti II; Konstandin Muzaka; Krokodeilos Kladas; Nicholas Pal Dukagjini; Lekë Dukagjini (until 1481)	(Ottoman Empire) Bayezid II (Ottoman Empire) Gedik Ahmed Pasha (Ottoman Empire) Hadım Suleiman Pasha (POW)

The Albanian Rebellion of 1481–1484 (Albanian: Rebelimi Shqiptar) was an uprising led by Gjon Kastrioti II, son of Gjergj Kastrioti Skanderbeg, against the Ottoman Empire.

== Background ==
After the death of Gjergj Kastrioti Skanderbeg, his wife, Donika Kastrioti, and only son, Gjon Kastrioti II, left Albania due to Ottoman expansion. They were granted feudal lands in Italy, specifically the Duchy of San Pietro in Galatina and the County of Soleto in the Province of Lecce. Gjon Kastrioti II later served in the army of the Duke of Calabria, who was besieging Otranto. Representatives from Himara, the area where the revolt began, called upon him to lead the uprising. Additionally, King Ferdinand I of Naples and Duke Alfonso encouraged him to incite an insurrection in Albania.

== Uprising ==
In early 1481, Gjon Kastrioti II set sail for Albania with four Neapolitan ships provided by Ferdinand I of Naples. Accompanied by his cousin, Konstantin Muzaka, Gjon disembarked south of Durrës, while Konstantin continued on to Himara. In his search for allies, Gjon enlisted Krokodeilos Kladas, a military leader from the Peloponnese, and sent him with Albanian-manned galleys to raid Ottoman positions in Morea. In February, Albanian rebels attacked Ottoman and Venetian positions in Albania. Despite the size of his army, Ahmed Pasha was aware of the tenuous Ottoman hold in the region, Ahmed Pasha sent a force to suppress the uprising. However, Gjon Kastrioti II defeated the Ottomans, capturing their weapons and supplies and delaying their plans to sail for Italy.

During the succession conflict between Bayezid II and his brother Cem Sultan, Bayezid summoned grand vizier Gedik Ahmed Pasha and his army for support. Although initially reluctant to abandon his campaign in Italy, Ahmed Pasha complied. However, when attempting to leave Albania, he encountered Albanian rebels blocking the main route with lances. After intense fighting, Ahmed Pasha managed to escape on 1 June 1481, but was forced to leave behind his livestock and supplies. His departure further intensified the Albanian rebellion. After several defeats, Ahmed Pasha was replaced by Suleiman Pasha, who dispatched a sanjak-bey with 2,000 men to expel Gjon Kastrioti II. Upon learning of the approaching Ottoman force, Gjon sent an advance force to confront them, but his troops were defeated with significant losses. Gjon considered retreating to Puglia but ultimately decided to stay. His decision rallied local support, and a force of 6,000 infantry and 400 cavalry gathered around him. With this strengthened force, John successfully defeated a second Ottoman force.

=== Siege of Himarë ===
The Albanian rebels in Himarë posed a significant threat to Ottoman control over Vlora. At his cousin's request, Konstantin Muzaka took command of the Himarë rebels and, with the support of Krokodeilos Kladas’ galleys, besieged the coastal cities of Himarë and Sopot by land and sea. As a result, Suleiman Pasha could not send troops to Otranto and knew that, if these cities fell, the Albanians would use them to launch attacks on Vlora and disrupt Ottoman shipping.

Siege of Himarë
Location	Ottoman Albania
Result	Albanian victory

Belligerents
Principality of Kastrioti	Ottoman Empire

Commanders and leaders
Gjon Kastrioti II	Hadım Suleiman Pasha (POW)

To reinforce the Ottoman garrison in Himarë, Suleiman set out with 3,000 men but encountered an Albanian force en route. The Ottoman army was defeated, with around 1,000 soldiers killed and captured, Suleiman Pasha himself was captured. This decisive victory, followed by the capture of Himarë on 31 August, and later Sopot, solidified Albanian control in the region.

=== Krujë campaign ===
After the success in southern Albania, Gjon, with an army of 7,000, launched an attack on Krujë. Initially, his forces failed to capture the city due to its strong defenses. However, by 1483, Gjon had successfully recaptured Krujë and other lost territories of the Principality of Kastrioti.

=== Decline and end of resistance ===
In 1483, a peace agreement was reached between the Ottoman Empire and the Kingdom of Naples, in which Naples agreed to cease its support for the Albanian rebels. In response, the Ottomans immediately strengthened their position in Albania and began reconquering lost territories. In January 1484, Gjon Kastrioti defeated an Ottoman army near the Erzen River. However, by the summer of 1484, the Ottomans had reconquered Himara, effectively bringing an end to the Albanian rebellion.

== Aftermath ==
After the fall of Himara, Gjon Kastrioti II was forced into exile once again.
