= Kastriot =

Kastriot or Kastrioti may refer to:

- Kastriot or Kastrioti, an Albanian name for Obiliq, a town and municipality in central Kosovo
- Kastriot, Albania or Kastrioti, a village and municipality in north-eastern Albania
- Kastriot (name), an Albanian masculine given name
- Kastrioti, an Albanian royal and noble family
- Principality of Kastrioti, a principality in medieval Albania
