= Costantino Castriota =

Prelate of the Catholic Church from 1497 to 1500

Most Reverend Costantino Castriota Kostandin Kastriota
- Bishop of Isernia
- Coat of arms of the Kastrioti family
- Church: Catholic Church
- Diocese: Diocese of Isernia
- In office: 1497–1500
- Predecessor: Francesco de Adamo de Lucharo
- Successor: Giovanni Olivieri

Personal details
- Born: 1477
- Died: 1500 (aged 22–23)

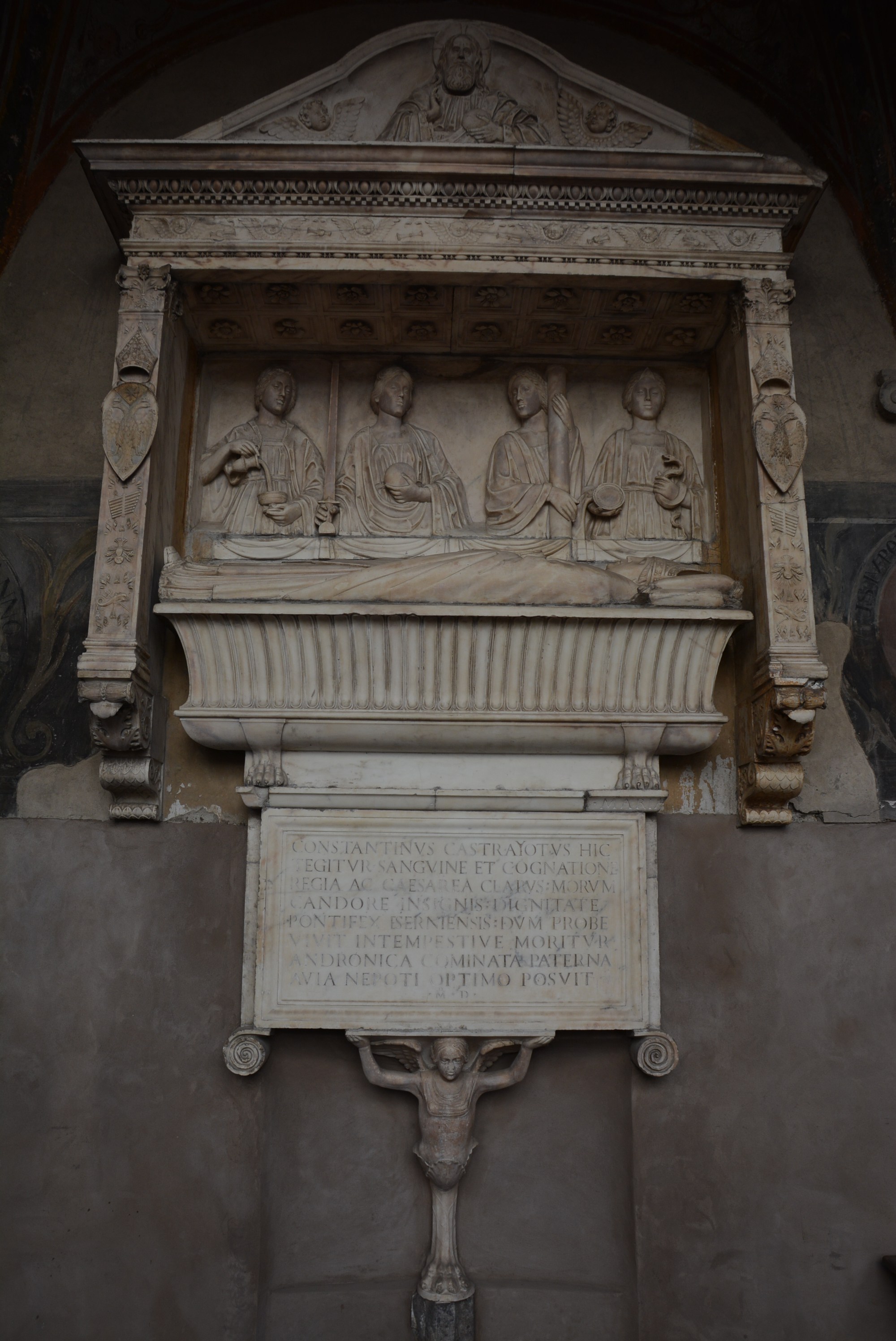
The tomb of the Albanian noble Costantino Castriota, built in 1500. Two Albanian eagles can be noticed in the left and right pillars

Costantino Castriota Scanderbeg (1477–1500) (Albanian: Kostandin Kastriota) was an Albanian nobleman from the House of Kastrioti and prelate of the Catholic Church who served as Bishop of Isernia (1497–1500).

== Biography ==
Costantino was born in 1477 to the House of Kastrioti, the son of Gjon Kastrioti II, son of Skanderbeg, and Jerina Branković, the daughter of Serbian Despot Lazar Branković. On 2 Oct 1497, he was appointed during the papacy of Pope Alexander VI as Bishop of Isernia. He served as Bishop of Isernia until his death in 1500.

== Family tree ==
Ancestors of Costantino Castriota

8. Gjon Kastrioti
4. Gjergj Kastrioti
9. Voisava Kastrioti
2. Gjon Kastrioti II
10. Gjergj Arianiti
5. Donika Kastrioti
11. Maria Muzaka
1. Costantino Castriota
12. Đurađ Branković
6. Lazar Branković
13. Irene Kantakouzene
3. Jerina Branković
14. Thomas Palaiologos
7. Helena Palaiologina
15. Catherine Zaccaria

== See also ==
- House of Kastrioti

Catholic Church titles
Preceded by Francesco de Adamo de Lucharo	Bishop of Isernia; 1497–1500	Succeeded by Giovanni Olivieri
