= Jerina Branković (wife of Gjon Kastrioti II) =

15th century Albanian noblewoman

- Full name: Jerina Branković
- Noble family: Branković (by birth); Kastrioti (by marriage)
- Spouse: Gjon Kastrioti II
- Issue: Ferdinand Castriota; Maria Castriota; Costantino; Giorgio Castriota; Alfonso Castriota
- Father: Lazar Branković
- Mother: Helena Palaiologina

Jerina Branković (Serbian Cyrillic: Јерина Бранковић) or Irina (Ирина), was a Serbian noblewoman and the wife of Gjon Kastrioti II. She was the third daughter of Lazar Branković and Helena Palaiologina.

== Family ==
Jerina had two sisters, Maria of Serbia, the wife of King Stephen Tomašević of Bosnia, and Milica, wife of Leonardo III Tocco of Epirus.

Jerina married Gjon Kastrioti II, the only child of Skanderbeg, and had the following issue:

- Costantino (b. 1477 d. 1500), Bishop of Isernia
- Ferdinand Castriota (d. 1561), Duke of San Pietro in Galatina
- Maria (d. 1569)

== Ancestry ==
Ancestors of Jerina Branković (wife of Gjon Kastrioti II)

16. Branko Mladenović
8. Vuk Branković
4. Đurađ I Branković
18. Lazar Hrebeljanović
9. Maria Lazarević
19. Milica Nemanjić
2. Lazar Branković
5. Eirene Kantakouzene
1. Jerina
24. John V Palaiologos
12. Manuel II Palaiologos
25. Helena Kantakouzene
6. Thomas Palaiologos
26. Constantine Dragaš
13. Helena Dragaš
27. Unnamed first wife
3. Helena Palaiologina
28. Andronikos Asen Zaccaria
14. Centurione II Zaccaria
29. Catherine Le Maure
7. Catherine Zaccaria
15. Asenina Palaiologina
