= Kastriot (name) =

Kastriot is an Albanian male given name, which is derived from the Kastrioti family, a medieval Albanian noble family. The name may refer to:

- Kastriot Dermaku (born 1992), Albanian footballer
- Kastriot Hysi (born 1958), Albanian footballer
- Kastriot Islami (born 1952), Albanian politician
- Kastriot Kastrati (born 1993), Finnish footballer
- Kastriot Medhi (1934–2018), Brazilian judoka
- Kastriot Peqini (born 1974), Albanian footballer
