= Helena of Bulgaria (disambiguation) =

Helena, Helen, Elena or Jelena of Bulgaria (Bulgarian: Елена; Serbian: Јелена) may refer to:

- Helena, Empress of Bulgaria, second wife of Bulgarian Emperor Ivan Asen I (d. 1196)
- Helena Asenina of Bulgaria, Empress consort of Byzantium; Theodore II Laskaris (1254–1258)
- Helena of Bulgaria, Empress of Serbia, Empress consort of Serbia; Stefan Uroš IV Dušan (1331–1355)

== See also ==
- Helena of Serbia (disambiguation)
