= Maria of Serbia =

Maria of Serbia or Marija of Serbia may refer to:

- Maria of Serbia, Duchess of Znojmo, daughter of grand prince Uroš I of Serbia
- Maria of Serbia (sultana), daughter of despot George Branković of Serbia
- Maria of Serbia, Queen of Bosnia, daughter of despot Lazar Branković of Serbia
- Maria of Serbia, Marchioness of Montferrat, daughter of despot Stefan Branković of Serbia

== See also ==
- Maria (disambiguation)
- Serbia (disambiguation)
