= House of Kastrioti =

Albanian noble family

Kastrioti Kastriotët
- Noble family
- Colored rendition of the Kastrioti coat of arms based on an illustration found in the book Gli Albanesi e la Questione Balkanica by prominent Arbëresh author and linguist Giuseppe Schirò
- Country: Medieval Albania: Principality of Kastrioti; League of Lezhë
- Current region: Mat, Dibër
- Founded: 14th and 15th centuries
- Titles: Lord of Albania; Prince of Kastrioti; Prince of Mat; Princess consort of Zeta; Princess consort of Bisignano; Duke of San Pietro in Galatina; Count of Soleto; Lord of Mat and Dibër; Ecclesiastical: Bishop of Isernia
- Members: Konstantin Kastrioti; Pal Kastrioti; Gjon Kastrioti; Stanisha Kastrioti; Mara Kastrioti; Mamica Kastrioti; Hamza Kastrioti; Skanderbeg; Gjon Kastrioti II; Costantino Castriota; Maria Castriota; Ferdinand Castriota; Erina Castriota; Reposh Kastrioti; Alfonso Castriota

The Kastrioti were an Albanian noble family, active in the 14th and 15th centuries as the rulers of the Principality of Kastrioti. At the beginning of the 15th century, the family controlled a territory in the Mat and Dibra regions. The most notable member was Gjergj Kastrioti, better known as Skanderbeg, regarded today as an Albanian hero for leading the resistance against Mehmed the Conqueror's efforts to expand the Ottoman Empire into Albania. After Skanderbeg's death and the fall of the Principality in 1468, the Kastrioti family gave their allegiance to the Kingdom of Naples and were given control over the Duchy of San Pietro in Galatina and the County of Soleto, now in the Province of Lecce, Italy. Ferrante (died 1561), son of Gjon Kastrioti II, Duke of Galatina and Count of Soleto, is the direct ancestor of all male members of the Kastrioti family today. Today, the family consists of two Italian branches, one in Lecce and the other in Naples.

The descendants of the House of Kastrioti in Italy use the family name "Castriota Scanderbeg". Other forms are Castrioto, Castriotto, Castriotta, Castrioti or Casteroti, and in Turkish Kastriyota.

== History ==
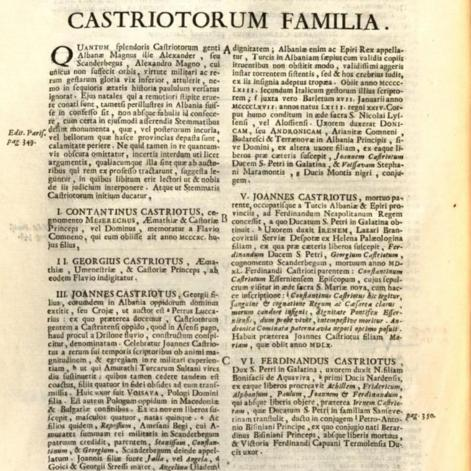
Genealogy of the Kastrioti family, Du Cange (1680), Historia Byzantina duplici commentario

A figure attested as Kastriot of Kanina in southern Albania who appears in a letter sent on September 2, 1368 by Alexander Komnenos Asen to the Ragusan senate has been hypothesised by a number of authors, mostly in the early 20th century, as an ancestor of the Kastrioti family. Heinrich Kretschmayr argued that this Kastriot may have been in fact Pal or Gjergj Kastrioti, John Fine considered it "probable" that this Kastriot was an ancestor of Gjon Kastrioti and Aleks Buda tried to bridge the geographical discrepancy between the Kastriot of Kanina who lived in southern Albania and the Kastrioti who were active in north-central Albania by arguing that after the fall of the Balšić, they returned to their ancestral lands in the Dibër valley. In contemporary historiography, the figure recorded as Kastriot of Kanina in 1368 is considered to be unrelated to the Kastrioti family. The Kastrioti so far remain absent from historical or archival records in comparison to other Albanian noble families until their first historical appearance at the end of the 14th century. The historical figure of Konstantin Kastrioti Mazreku is attested in Giovanni Andrea Angelo Flavio Comneno's Genealogia diversarum principum familiarum. Angelo mentions Kastrioti as Constantinus Castriotus, cognomento Meserechus, Aemathiae & Castoriae Princeps (Constantinus Castriotus, surnamed Meserechus, Prince of Aemathia and Castoria). The toponym Castoria has been interpreted as Kastriot, Kastrat in Has, Kastrat in Dibra or the microtoponym "Kostur" near the village of Mazrek in the Has region. In connection to the Kastrioti family name, it is very likely that the name of one the different Kastriot or Kastrat which were fortified settlements as their etymology shows (castrum) was as their family name. The Kastrioti may have originated from this village or probably had acquired it as pronoia. Angelo used the cognomen Meserechus in reference to Skanderbeg and this link to the same name is produced in other sources and reproduced in later ones like Du Cange's Historia Byzantina (1680). These links highlight that the Kastrioti used Mazreku as a name that highlighted their tribal affiliation (farefisni). The name Mazrek(u), which means horse breeder in Albanian, is found throughout all Albanian regions. The Kastrioti themselves were organised in a tribal structure and formed a fis or clan/tribe.

Konstantin Kastrioti's son, who was the father of Gjon Kastrioti and grandfather of Skanderbeg, appears in two historical sources, Gjon Muzaka's Breve memoria de li discendenti de nostra casa Musachi (1510) and Andrea Angelo's Genealogia diversarum principum familiarum (1603/1610) who was later largely reproduced by Du Cange (1680). Angelo calls Gjon Kastrioti's father "Georgius Castriotus" (Gjergj), lord (princeps) of "Aemathiae, Umenestria" (Mat and probably Ujëmisht) and "Castoriae". Muzaka calls him "Paulo Castrioto" (Pal) and asserts that "he ruled over no more than two villages, called Signa and Gardi Ipostesi" (Sinë and Gardhi i Poshtëm, in Çidhën of Dibër). His first name is disputed. Neither name can be characterized as the correct version because of an extreme lack of sources. The name "Paulo" (Pal) is mentioned only by one author (Muzaka) and wasn't used as the name of any of his grandsons (Reposh, Konstantin, Stanisha, Gjergj) or great-grandsons (Giorgio, Costantino, Ferrante).

His rule over "only two villages" as described by Muzaka has been disputed because if true, it would mean that his son, Gjon Kastrioti who ruled over a much larger area rose to power in the span of one generation. This is considered a very unlikely trajectory in the context of Albanian medieval society because noble families had acquired their area of influence over multiple generations. Historian Kristo Frashëri considers it likely that he ruled over his region "in the third quartier of the 14th century" between 1350-75 based on the fact that when his grandson Gjergj Kastrioti was born, his son Gjon had already fathered eight children.

His son, Gjon Kastrioti (died 1437), became the lord of Matia (Mat). He managed to expand his territory but was ultimately subdued by the invading Ottomans. The most notable member was Gjergj Kastrioti, better known as Skanderbeg (1405–1468), declared an Albanian national hero, renowned in Albanian folklore for uniting the Albanian principalities in a military and diplomatic alliance, the League of Lezhë, which fought against Mehmed the Conqueror's efforts to further expand the Ottoman Empire into Europe.

== Titles ==
The list of titles used by Kastrioti family are:

Albania in the Middle Ages

- Lord or King of Albania
- Prince of Kruja (Principality of Kastrioti)
- Lord of Sina and Lower Gardi
- Lord of Emathia and Vumenestia

In Ottoman Empire

- Sanjakbey of the Sanjak of Dibra
- Subaşi of Krujë

In the Kingdom of Naples

- Duke of San Pietro in Galatina
- Count of Soleto
- Signore of Monte Sant'Angelo
- Signore of San Giovanni Rotondo
- Baron of Gagliano
- Baron of Salignano
- Baron of Arigliano

== Members ==
- Kostandin Kastrioti, possibly the father of Pal Kastrioti
  - Pal Kastrioti - had the title "segnior de Signa et de Gardi-ipostesi" (Sina (Albanian: Sinë) and Lower Gardi (Albanian: Gardhi i Poshtëm)), three sons
    - Aleks Kastrioti - lord of three villages, unknown issue
    - Kostandin Kastrioti - Lord of Kruja castle (Latin: dominus Serinae), unknown issue
    - Gjon Kastrioti (d. 1437), married Voisava Tripalda, nine children
      - Reposh Kastrioti - (d. 1430 or 1431), unknown issue, possibly father of Constantine
      - Stanisha Kastrioti - (d. 1445?), one son
        - Hamza Kastrioti - (d. after 1457)
      - Kostandin Kastrioti, unknown issue, possibly father of Constantine
      - Mara Kastrioti, married Stefan Crnojević, buried in Kom Monastery, three sons (Ivan, Andrija and Božidar)
      - Skanderbeg (Gjergj Kastrioti) - Albanian national hero (d. 1468), married Donika Arianiti
        - Gjon Kastrioti II (d. 1501)- Count of Soleto, married Jerina Branković, daughter of despot Lazar Branković of Serbia
          - Costantino Castriota (d. 1500), bishop of Isernia (fl. 1498)
          - Ferdinand Castriota (d. 1561), duke of San Pietro in Galatina, Venetian military (fl. 1499–1501)
            - Erina Castriota (1528–1565), Princess of Bisignano, Duchess of San Pietro and countess of Soleto
          - Maria Castriota (d. 1560)
          - Giorgio (d. 1540)
          - Alfonso Castriota (1488–1503)
      - Jelena Kastrioti (Gjela) - married Pavle Balšić with whom she had George Strez Balšić, Lord of Misia
      - Mamica Kastrioti, married Muzakë Thopia in 1445
      - Angelina Kastrioti, married Vladan Arianiti, secondly Ajdin Muzaka
      - Vlajka Kastrioti, married Gjin Muzaka, secondly Stefan Strez Balšić, two sons with Stefan with whom she had Gojko Balšić and Ivan Strez Balšić

Two possible members of the Kastrioti are recorded in the Ottoman defter of 1467. The first, a certain Dimitri Kastrijoti, appears as a household head from the village of Setina e Poshtme which, alongside Setina e Sipërme, can be identified with Signa which was traditionally held by the Kastrioti. The second was a yamak by the name of Mark Kastrioti from Derjan who was stationed in Shtjaknëz (modern Shqefën).

== Italian period ==
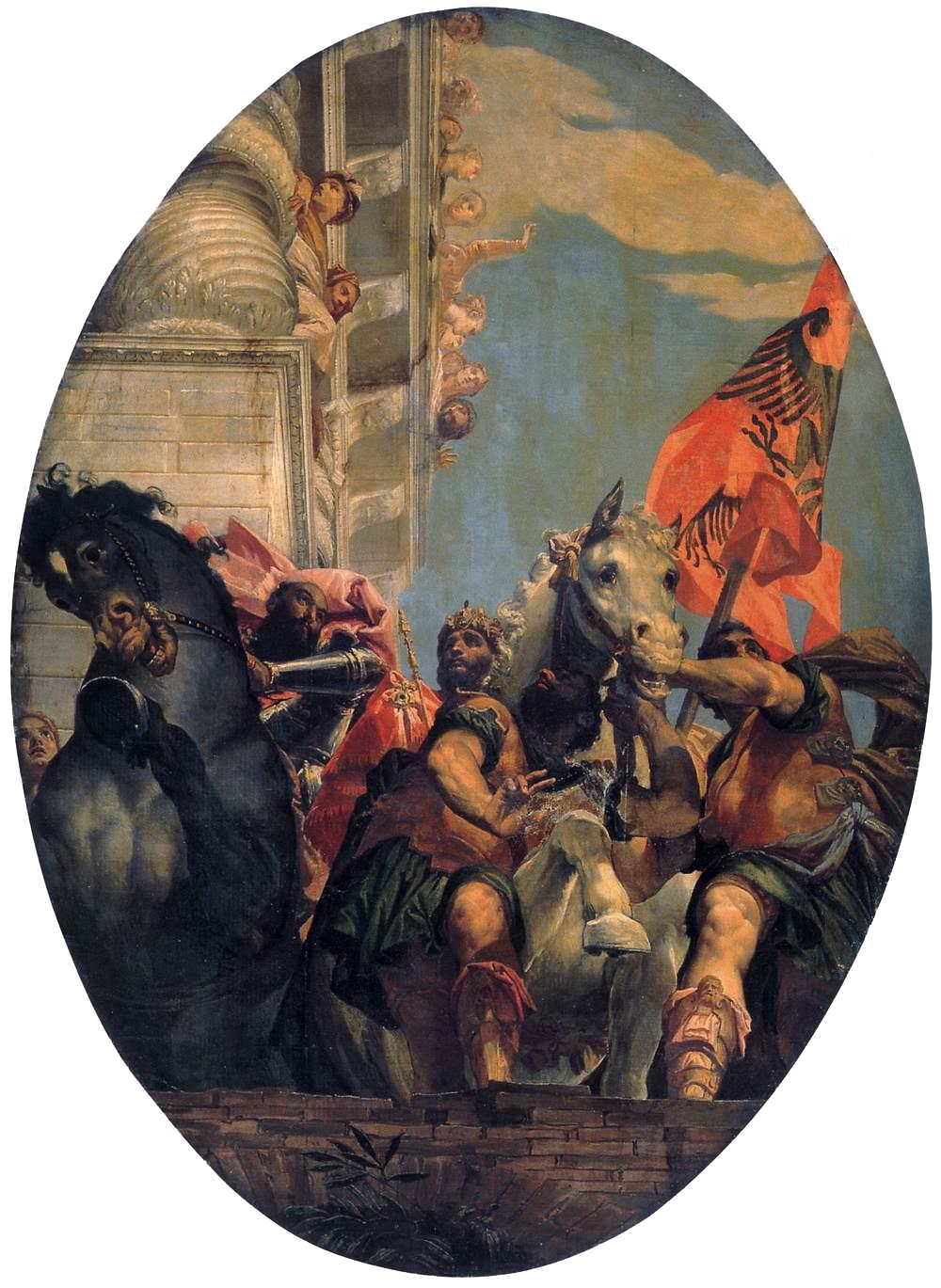
Trionfo di Mardocheo by Paolo Veronese in the church of San Sebastiano, Venice, 1556. Skanderbeg, who holds the Albanian flag, is depicted as the Biblical hero Mordechai who saved the Hebrews in the Achaemenid Empire

After the fall of Albania to the Ottoman Empire, the Kingdom of Naples gave land and noble title to Skanderbeg's family, the Kastrioti. His family were given control over the Duchy of San Pietro in Galatina and the County of Soleto, now in the Province of Lecce in Italy. His son, Gjon Kastrioti II, married Jerina Branković, daughter of Serbian Despot Lazar Branković and one of the last descendants of the Palaiologos. Two patrilineal branches of the Kastrioti family exist today: the branch of Lecce with two sub-branches and the branch of Naples with one sub-branch. Both branches are patrilineally descended from the sons of Ferrante (-1561), Duke of Galatina and Count of Soleto.

== Armorials ==
=== Main branch ===
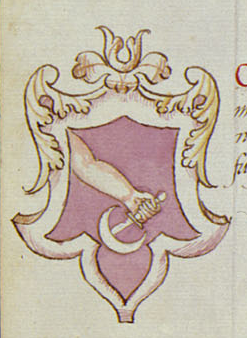
Venetian Armorial (16th century)

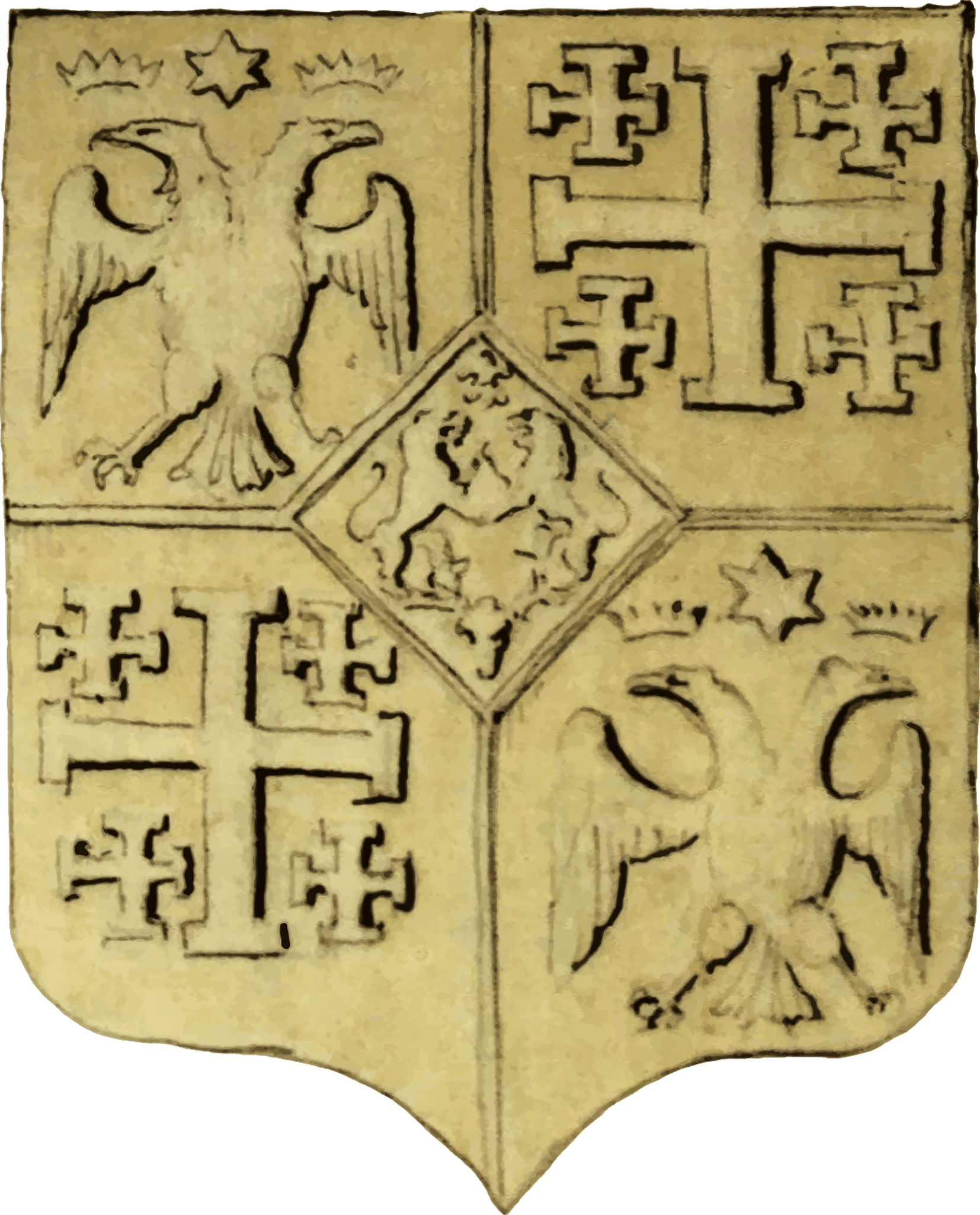
Coat of arms of Gjon Kastrioti II and Ferdinand Castriota (16th century)

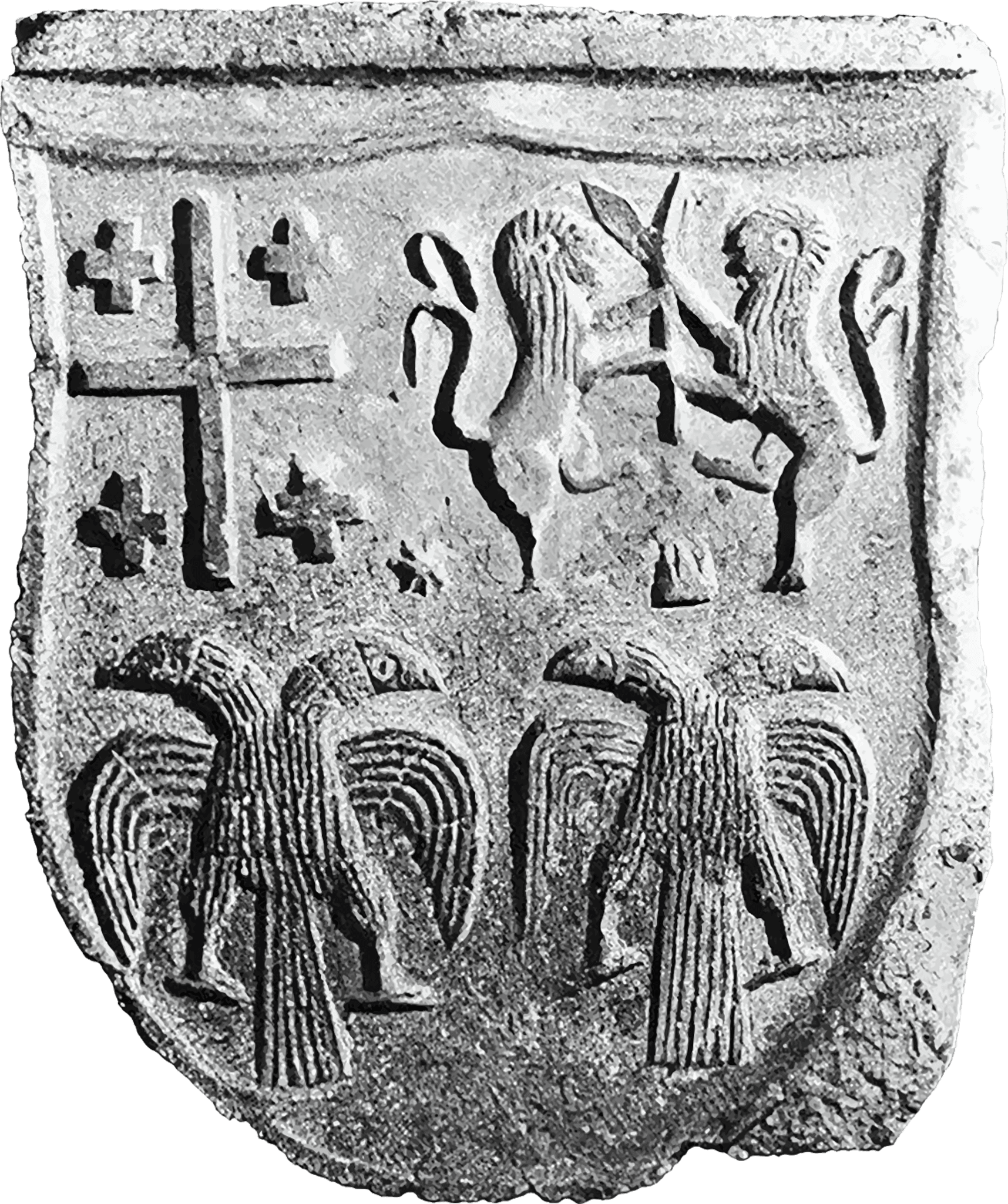
Coat of arms of Erina Castriota (16th century)

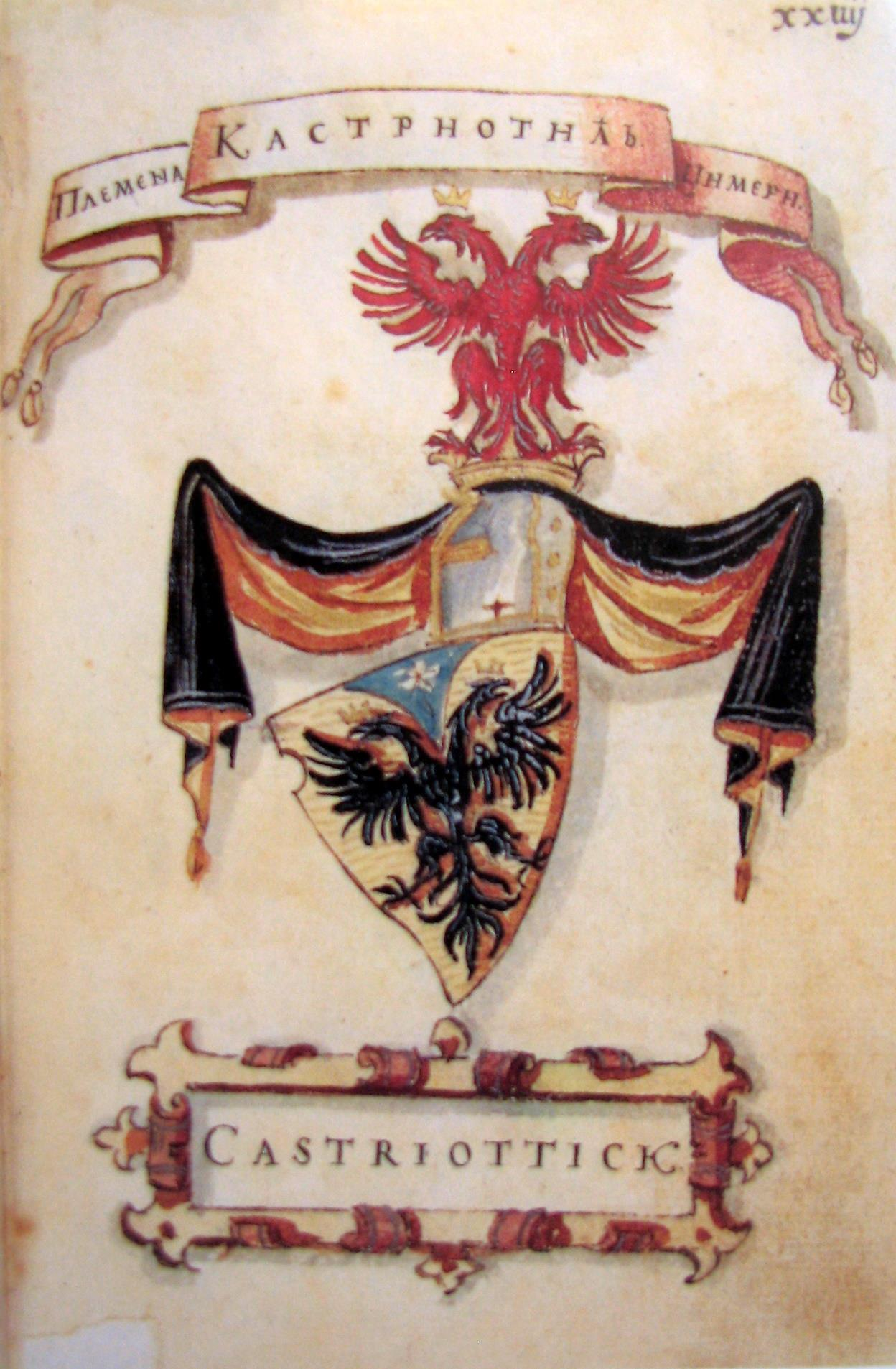
Korenić-Neorić Armorial (1595)

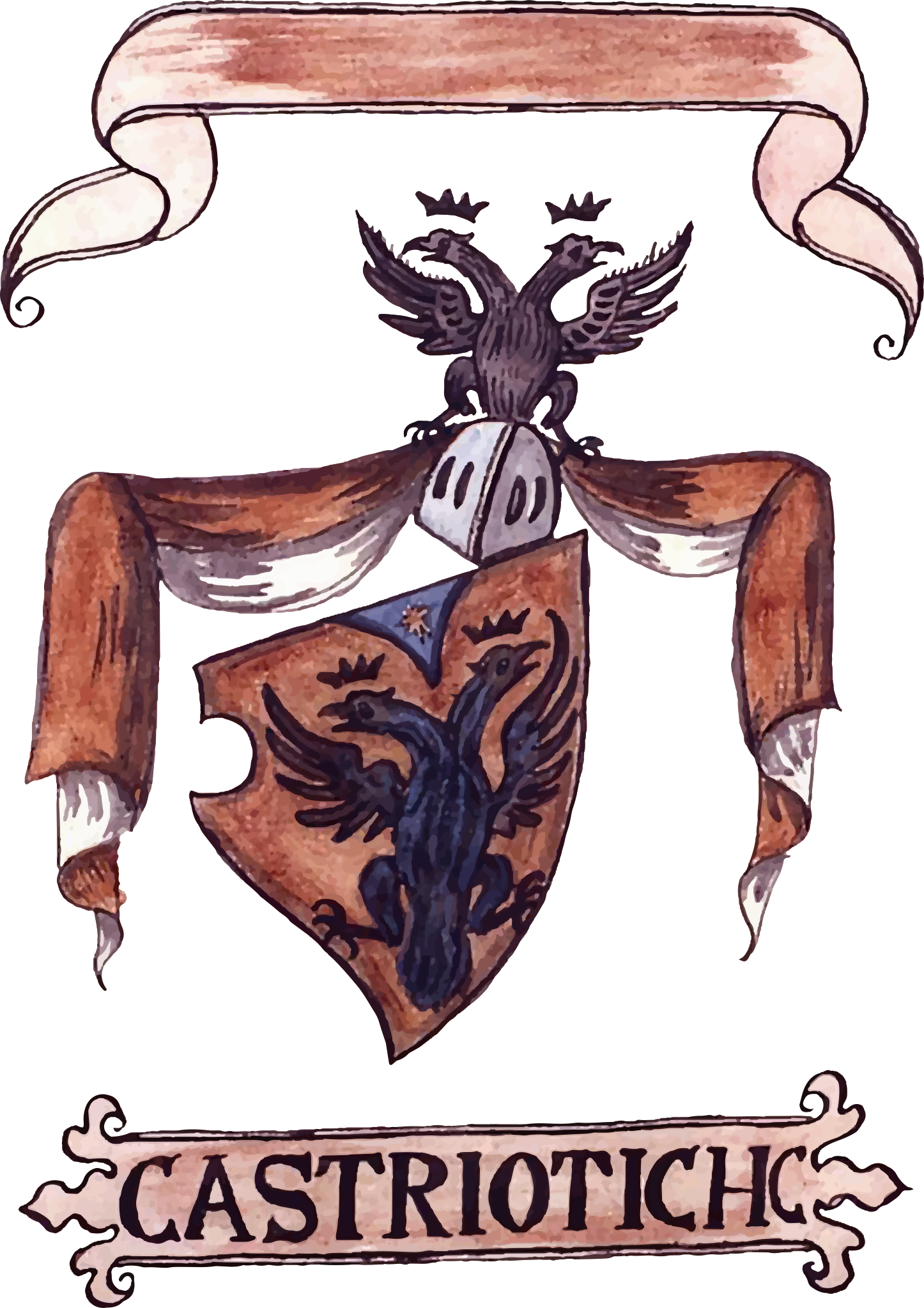
Fojnica Armorial (1675-1688)

Charles du Fresne, sieur du Cange (1680)

Giuseppe Schirò (1904)

=== Cadet branches ===
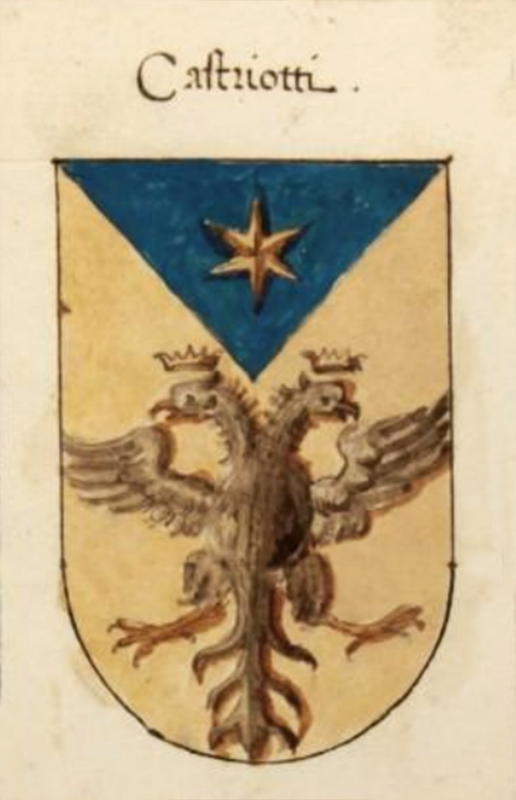
Coat of arms of the Neapolitan branch of the family by Giacomo Fontana (1605)

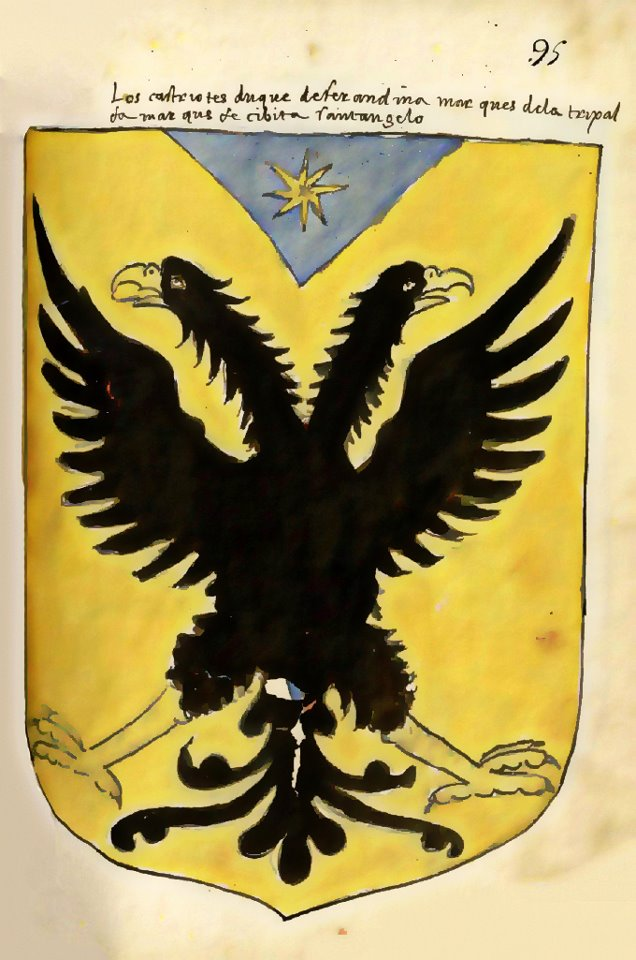
Coat of arms of the Neapolitan branch of the family by Jerónimo de Bolea (17th century)

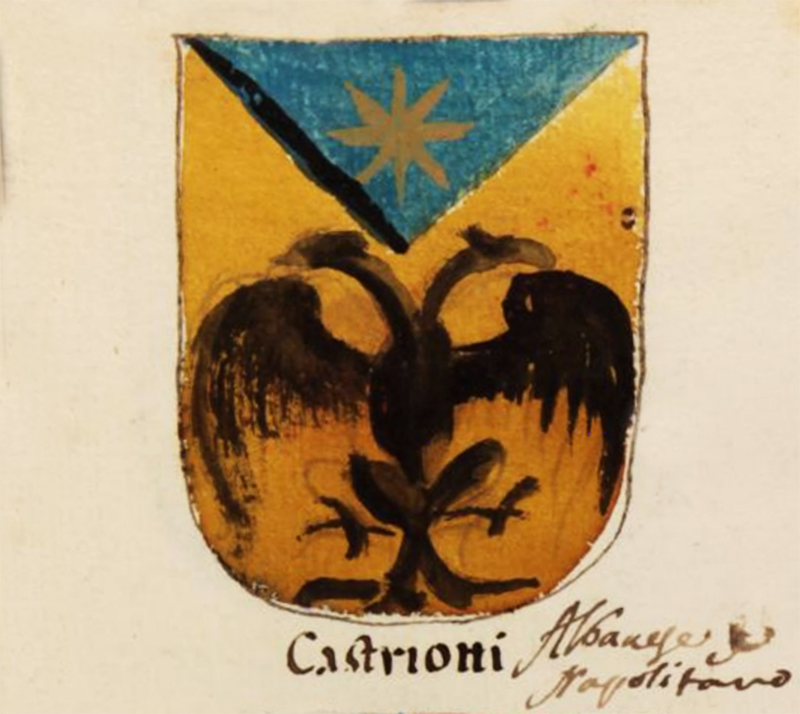
Coat of arms of the Neapolitan branch of the family by Angelo Maria da Bologni (1715)

== Sources ==
- Bela, Muhamet (2019). "A ishte Skënderbeu nga Hasi?! - Mendime rreth origjinës së Skënderbeut". In Syla, Sabit; Verli, Marenglen; Asani, Skënder; Berisha, Gjon (eds.). Gjergj Kastrioti - Skënderbeu në 550-vjetorin e vdekjes: (materiale nga Konferenca shkencore ndërkombëtare "Gjergj Kastrioti - Skënderbeu në 550-vjetorin e vdekjes", mbajtur në Prishtinë, më 16 tetor 2018) (PDF) (in Albanian). Institute of history "Ali Hadri". ISBN 978-9951409803.
- Buda, Aleks (1986). Shkrime Historike. Shtëpia Botuese "8 Nëntori". ISBN 9992716517.
- Ducellier, Alain (1981). La façade maritime de l'Albanie au Moyen âge: Durazzo et Valona du XIe au XVe siècle. Ed. de l'Ècole des Hautes Études en Sciences Sociales.
- Fine, John (1994). The Late Medieval Balkans: A Critical Survey from the Late Twelfth Century to the Ottoman Conquest. University of Michigan Press. ISBN 978-0-472-08260-5.
- Gibbon, Edward (1901) [1802], The decline and fall of the Roman empire, P. F. Collier & Son, OCLC 317326240
- Hodgkinson, Harry (1999). Scanderbeg: From Ottoman Captive to Albanian Hero. London: Centre for Albanian Studies. ISBN 978-1-873928-13-4.
- Malaj, Edmond (2013). "Familje fisnike të Drishtit mesjetar (Noble Families of Medieval Drivasto". Studime Historike. 3–4.
- Muhaj, Ardian (2015). "Hulumtimi i origjinës së Skënderbeut përmes historisë së jetës dhe veprës së tij". 610-vjetori i lindjes së Heroit Kombëtar Gjergj Kastrioti Skënderbeu. Academy of Sciences of Albania.
- Omari, Jeton (2014). Scanderbeg tra storia e storiografia [Skanderbeg between history and historiography] (PDF) (Thesis). University of Padua.
- Runciman, Steven (1990), The fall of Constantinople, 1453, Cambridge University Press, ISBN 978-0-521-39832-9
