= Soleto =

Soleto Sulìto (Greek)
- Comune
- Comune di Soleto
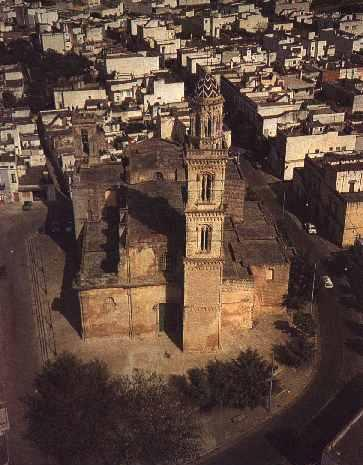
- Plazza and town Church of Soleto

- Coat of arms

- Location within Italy Location within Apulia
- Coordinates: 40°11′N 18°12′E
- Country: Italy
- Region: Apulia
- Province: Lecce (LE)

Area
  - Total: 29 km^{2} (11 sq mi)
- Elevation: 91 m (299 ft)

Population (30 November 2014)
  - Total: 5,523
  - Density: 190/km^{2} (490/sq mi)
- Demonym: Soletani
- Time zone: UTC+1 (CET)
  - Summer (DST): UTC+2 (CEST)
- Postal code: 73010
- Dialing code: 0836
- ISTAT code: 075076
- Patron saint: St. Anthony of Padua
- Website: Official website

Soleto (Griko: Sulìtu; Salentino: Sulìtu; Latin: Soletum) is a small Griko-speaking city located in the province of Lecce in Apulia, Italy. The town has a total population of 5,542 and is one of the nine towns of Grecìa Salentina where the Greek dialect Griko is spoken.

== History ==
In the 5th century, Soleto was elevated to the seat of a bishopric of the Byzantine Rite. In the Middle Ages it was ruled by Count Gjon Kastrioti II, son of the Albanian national hero Gjergj Kastrioti. In the 13th century the Angevine rulers of Naples chose the city as the capital of a county, later ruled by the Castro, Balzo, Orsini, Campofregoso, Castriota, Sanseverino, Carafa, and Gallarati-Scotti families, until feudal control was finally abolished in 1806. Soleto became part of the Neapolitan Republic of 1799 and was a center of the Carboneria during the Italian Risorgimento.

== Soleto Map ==
The Soleto Map, the oldest geographical map in the Western world, was discovered in Soleto by Belgian archaeologist Thierry van Compernolle of Montpellier University on 21 August 2003.

== Notable people ==
- Matteo Tafuri (1492–1582), philosopher, astrologer and physician.

== See also ==
- Kastrioti family
- Orsini family
