= Gjon Kastrioti II =

15th century Albanian nobleman

Gjon II Kastrioti
- Prince of Albania; Prince of Kastrioti; Duke of San Pietro in Galatina
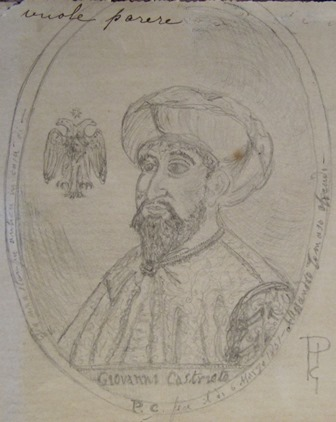

Prince of Kastrioti
- Reign: 1468–1468; 1481–1484
- Predecessor: Gjergj Kastrioti
- Other titles: Count of Soleto; Signore of Monte Sant'Angelo and San Giovanni Rotondo; Signore of Gagliano del Capo and Oria; Lord of Krujë
- Born: 1456; Petralba, Principality of Kastrioti
- Died: 2 August 1514 (aged 57–58)
- Noble family: Kastrioti
- Spouse: Jerina Branković
- Issue: Costantino Castriota; Ferdinand Castriota; Giorgio Castriota; Maria Castriota; Alfonso Castriota
- Father: Gjergj Kastrioti
- Mother: Andronika Arianiti

Gjon II Kastrioti (Italian: Ioanne Castrioto, Giovanni Castrioto; 1456 – 2 August 1514), was an Albanian prince and the son of Gjergj Kastrioti Skanderbeg, the Albanian national hero, and of Andronika Arianiti, daughter of Gjergj Arianiti. He was for a short time Lord of Krujë after his father's death, then Duke of San Pietro in Galatina (1485), Count of Soleto, Signore of Monte Sant'Angelo and San Giovanni Rotondo. In 1495, Ferdinand I of Naples gave him the title of the Signore of Gagliano del Capo and Oria. While in his early teens, he was forced to leave the country after the death of his father in 1468. He is also known for his role in the Albanian Rebellion of 1481–1484, when, after reaching the Albanian coast from Italy and settling in Himara, he led a rebellion against the Ottoman Empire. In June 1481, he supported forces of Ivan Crnojević to successfully recapture Zeta from the Ottomans. He was unable to re-establish the Kastrioti Principality and liberate Albania from the Ottomans, and he retired in Italy after three years of war in 1484.

== The return of Gjon II Kastrioti in Albania (1481-1484) ==
Gjon II Kastrioti was born in 1456 in Petralba castle (modern Gur i Bardhë) and according to Marin Barleti, Skanderbeg before battle of Albulena took his wife and son to Krujë. With the death of his father, Skanderbeg, in 1468, he migrated with his mother, and for a short period of time lived in the Kingdom of Naples, in the properties he had inherited from his father, Skanderbeg. He was fighting against the Ottomans in Otranto, when representatives of the Albanian insurgents asked Gjon II Kastrioti to return to Albania and he accepted their request, starting the Albanian Rebellion of 1481–1488

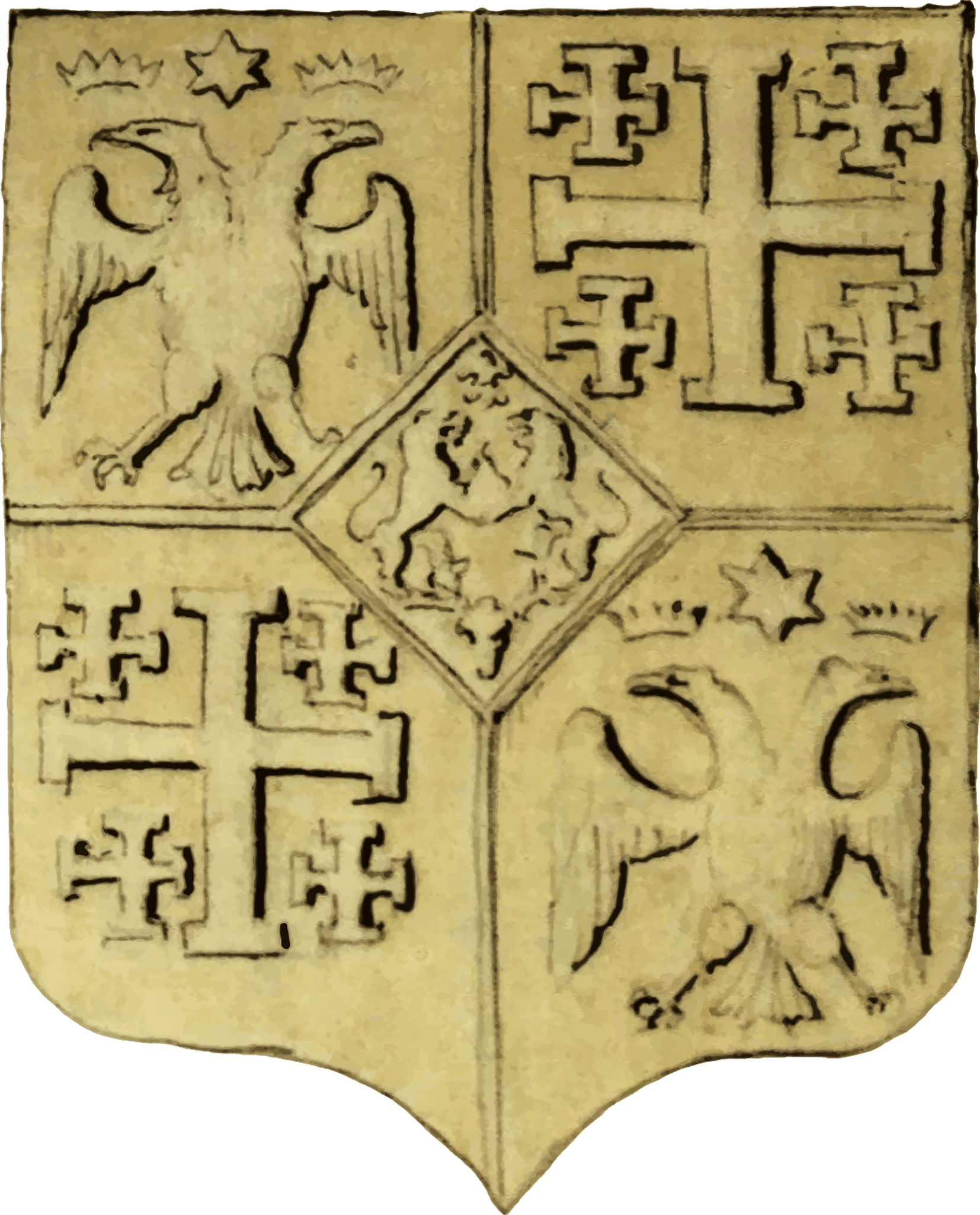
The Coat of arms of Gjon Kastrioti II

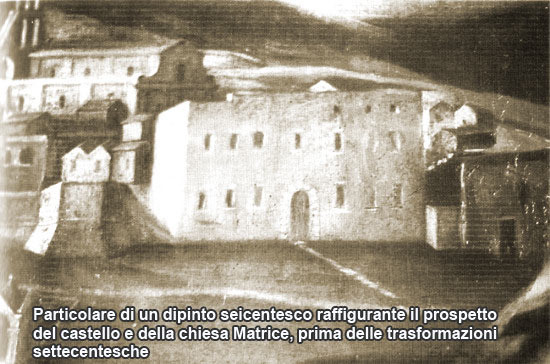
16th century painting of Galatina Palace the former home of the Castriota family

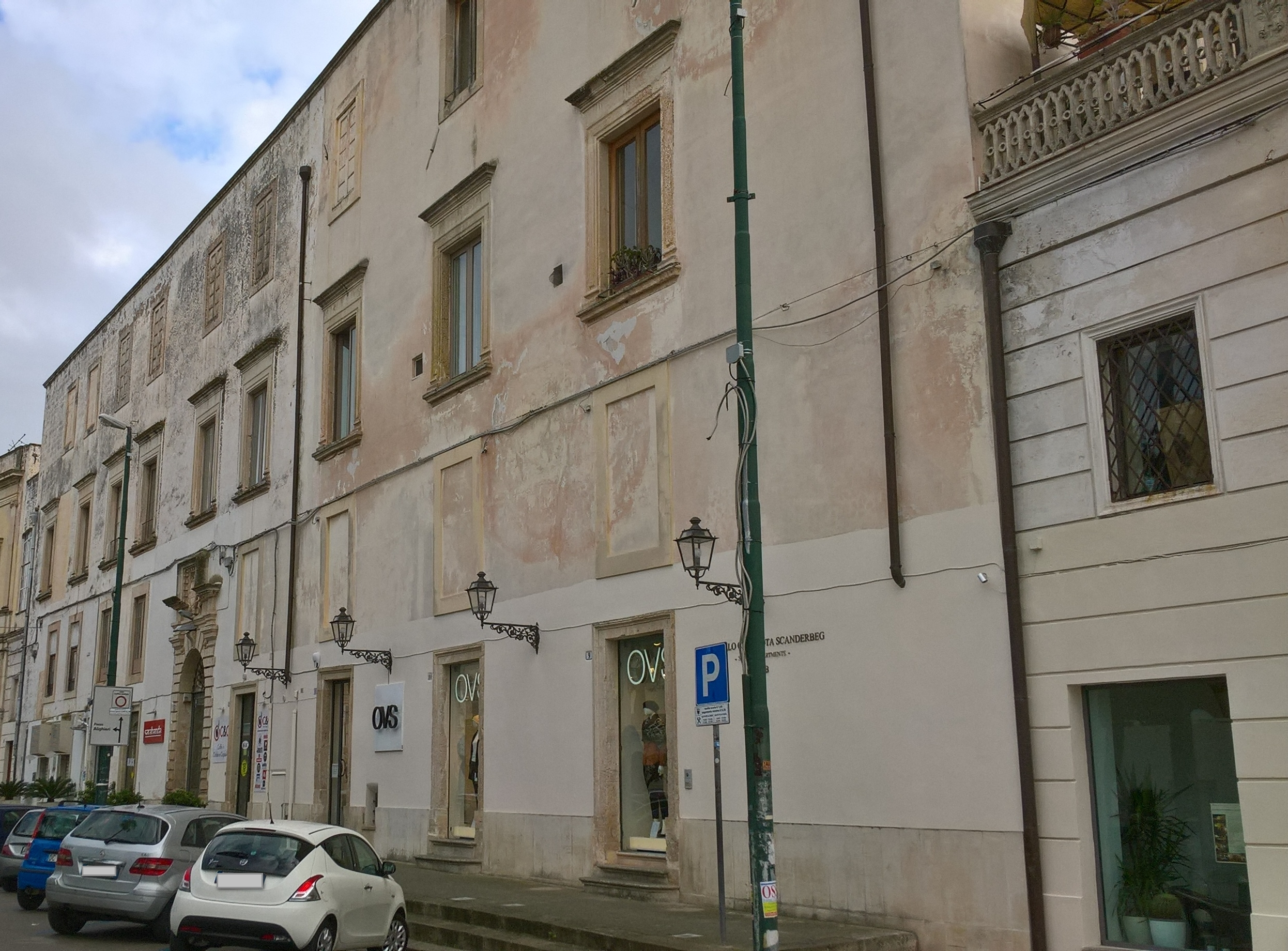
The Galatina Palace today

Taking advantage of the interest of the Neapolitan court at this time in expanding the front of the war against the Ottoman invaders, Gjon II Kastrioti managed to obtain from King Ferdinand the necessary means of navigation to come to Albania together with a number of warriors. In four Neapolitan ships (galera) he loaded his forces and set sail for the homeland with his cousin, Kostandin Muzaka.

After Gjon II Kastrioti landed south of Durrës in 1481, Neapolitan ships headed for southern Albania and landed Kostandin Muzaka in the Himara area, where another hotbed of anti-Ottoman uprisings had been created. Meanwhile, in northern Albania, in the mountainous regions of Lezha and Shkodra, the forces of Nikollë and Lekë Dukagjini operated. They also attacked the city of Shkodra, which forced Sulejman Pasha to send military reinforcements to this area as well.

Gjon II Kastrioti was welcomed by the inhabitants of central Albania as the legal heir of the country. With his arrival the insurgents of these regions intensified the struggle for the expulsion of the Ottoman invaders. In these conditions, Sulejman saw Eunuku launched against them a part of the Ottoman army, which was preparing in the vicinity of Vlora to go to Italy.

To withstand the attack of the Ottoman army, Gjon II Kastrioti sent a part of his fighters to defend a path from which the enemy troops would pass. But the Albanian fighters could not withstand the attack of the Ottoman forces and almost all of the Albanian soldiers were taken prisoner. This loss shook Gjon II Kastrioti's confidence in the success of the uprising, so he thought of leaving Albania and returning to Italy. But the inhabitants of the Kastriot possessions expressed a massive readiness to continue the fight against the Ottoman invaders. About 7,000 Albanian infantry gathered around Gjon II Kastriot and in the first half of August 1481 attacked and defeated an Ottoman army of 2,000 to 3,000 soldiers. In addition to this victory, the Albanians who had been captured by the Ottomans in the previous battle were also released.

Also during August 1481, in the western parts of southern Albania, especially in the region of Himara, fierce fighting took place between Albanians and Ottoman troops. Under the leadership of Kostandin Muzaka, Albanian fighters surrounded and attacked the castles of Himara and Sopot (Borsh), capturing both of them. The very difficult situation that was created for the Ottoman forces, operating in these areas, forced Sulejman Pasha to leave on his own at the head of 3,000 soldiers in the direction of Himara. But on the way they were defeated in battle by the Albanians and left over 1,000 Ottomans killed and prisoners. Among the captives was the beylerbey of Rumelia, Sulejman Pasha, whom the Albanians gave as a war trophy to Gjon II Kastrioti.

After the victory of the Albanians over the troops of Sinan Pasha, in the coastal areas of southern Albania, the castle of Himara was liberated on August 31, 1481 and then the castle of Sopot.

The defeat of Sulejman Pasha's army in Albania greatly facilitated the anti-Ottoman military actions that took place in the Kingdom of Naples. On September 10, 1481, the army of Naples liberated the castle of Otranto and thus expelled the Ottomans from Italy.

After the victories of the Albanians during the month of August 1481 against the army of Sulejman Pasha, their military actions for the liberation of the cities and castles in Albania were expanded. Gjon II Kastriot's fighters turned to Kruja and launched attacks to liberate it. Although the Albanian army failed to take Kruja, because the castle of Kruja was very fortified and impregnable by force of arms, by the end of 1481 the Albanians liberated a considerable part of the Kastrioti possessions including Kruja, by 1483. Gjon II Kastrioti became known as the Prince of the liberated Albanian lands.

After the peace agreement of 1483 between the Ottoman Empire and the Kingdom of Naples, the Ottoman armies strengthened their activity for the reconquest of the Kastrioti possessions and other free Albanian territories. Although in January 1484, Gjon II Kastriot's fighters defeated an Ottoman army near the Erzen River, but the resistance and organized struggle of the Albanians temporarily began to weaken due to the great and unceasing pressure of the invading Ottoman forces. In the summer of 1484 the Ottomans reconquered the castle of Himara. The fall of the anti-Ottoman resistance forced Gjon II Kastrioti to leave Albania and settle again in the properties that the Kastriots had in Italy. The same thing was done by other Albanian rulers, who had emigrated and came to Albania in the early 1480s to lead the anti-Ottoman uprisings. Shortly after, the Himarotes liberated and held resistance against the Ottoman Empire, which lasted until 1488.

== Family ==
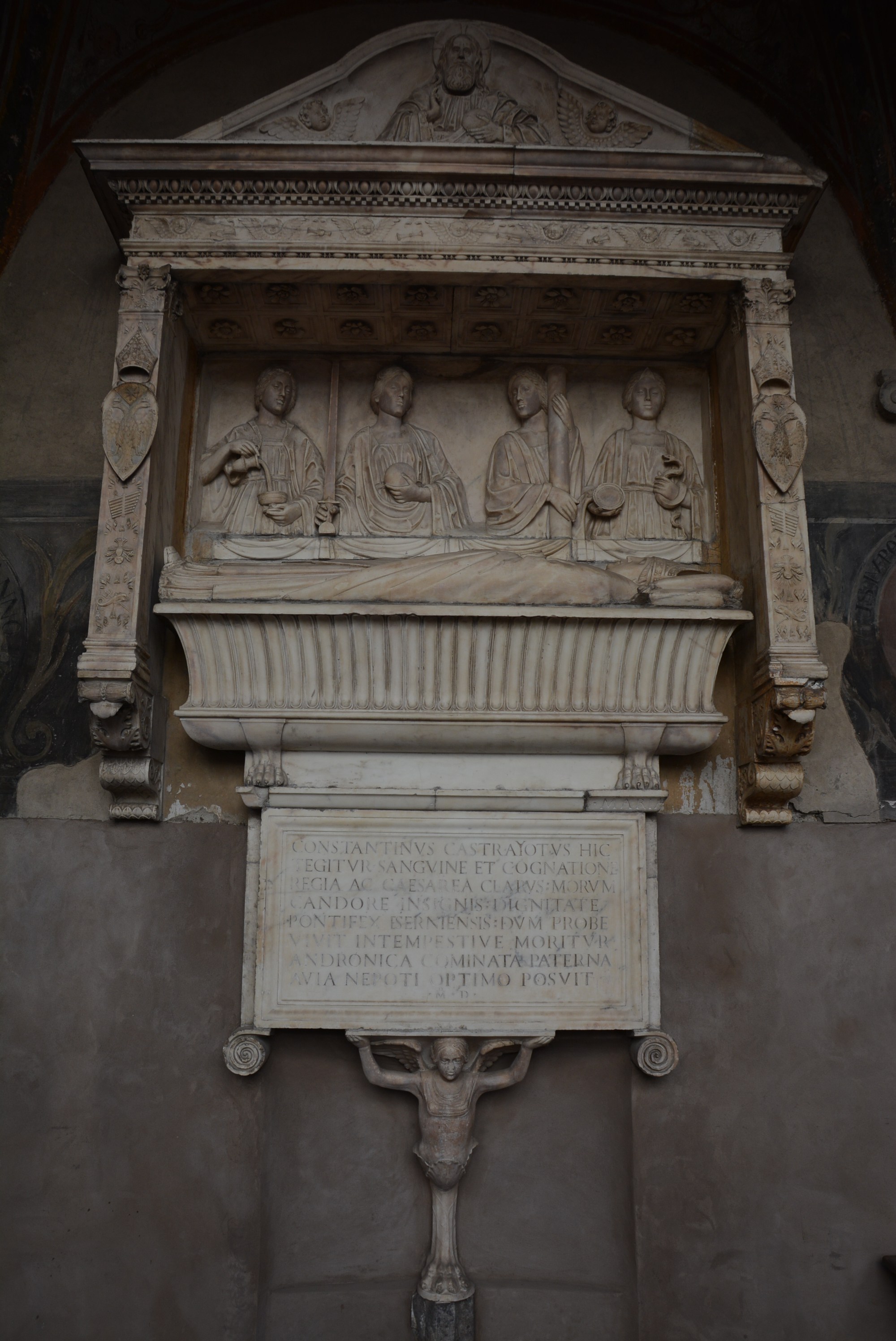
The tomb of the Albanian noble Costantino Castriota, built in 1500. Two Albanian eagles can be noticed in the left and right pillars

Gjon II married Princess Jerina Branković,(also Irina or Irene). They had the following issue:

- Giorgio Castriota (died 1540),
- Costantino Castriota (1477–1500), Bishop of Isernia
- Ferdinand Castriota (d. 1561), 2nd Duke of San Pietro in Galatina and 2nd Count of Soleto, who married Adriana Acquaviva-d'Aragona of Nardò with whom he had one surviving legitimate daughter : Erina Castriota, who succeeded most of her fathers titles and properties, that would later be passed on to her husband. Erina married Pietro Antonio Sanseverino, Prince of Bisignano. The couple had a daughter, Princess Vittoria Sanseverino, and a son, Prince Niccolò Sanseverino, who inherited his fathers titles. Other than Erina, Ferdinand had several male and female natural children, from whom descend the current members of the Castriota family. His sons, were:

Federico Castriota, Baron of Gagliano
Pardo Castriota
Achille Castriota
Alfonso Castriota
Paolo Castriota
Giovanni Castriota
Ferrante Castriota

- Maria Castriota (d. 1569), who married Carlo Minutolo and dedicated herself to art.
- Alfonso Castriota (d. 1503) who, while visiting the spanish court with his paternal grandmother Lady Andronika in 1503, died suddenly aged only 15. He was buried with royal honours in Valencia, Spain. Some years later, in 1506, Alfonso would be joined by his grandmother who was buried in Valencia as well.

The Castriota descendants living in Italy today represent the only descendants of Manuel II Palaiologos, great-grandfather of Irina.

== See also ==
Ancestors of Gjon Kastrioti II

16. Kostandin Kastrioti
8. Pal Kastrioti
4. John Castriot
2. Skanderbeg
5. Voisava
1. John Castriot II
12. Komnen Arianiti
6. Gjergj Arianiti
13. daughter of Nicholas Zaharia
3. Andronika Arianiti
14. Andrea III Muzaka
7. Maria Muzaka
15. Chiranna Zenevisi

== Sources ==
- Akademia e Shkencave e Shqipërisë, Instituti i Historisë; K. Prifti; Xh. Gjeçovi; M. Korkuti; G. Shpuza; S. Anamali; K. Biçoku; F. Duka; S. Islami; S. Naçi; F. Prendi; S. Pulaha; P. Xhufi (2002), Historia e Popullit Shqiptar (Vëllimi I) (in Albanian), Tirana, Albania: Toena, ISBN 99927-1-622-3
- Anamali, Skënder (2002), Historia e popullit shqiptar në katër vëllime (in Albanian), vol. I, Botimet Toena, OCLC 52411919
- Noli, Fan (1962), Historia e Skënderbeut (in Albanian), Tirana, Albania: N.Sh. botimeve "Naim Frashëri"
- Runciman, Steven (1990), The fall of Constantinople, 1453, Cambridge University Press, ISBN 978-0-521-39832-9
