= Lazar Branković =

Despot of Serbia from 1456 to 1458

- Despot of the Kingdom of Rascia
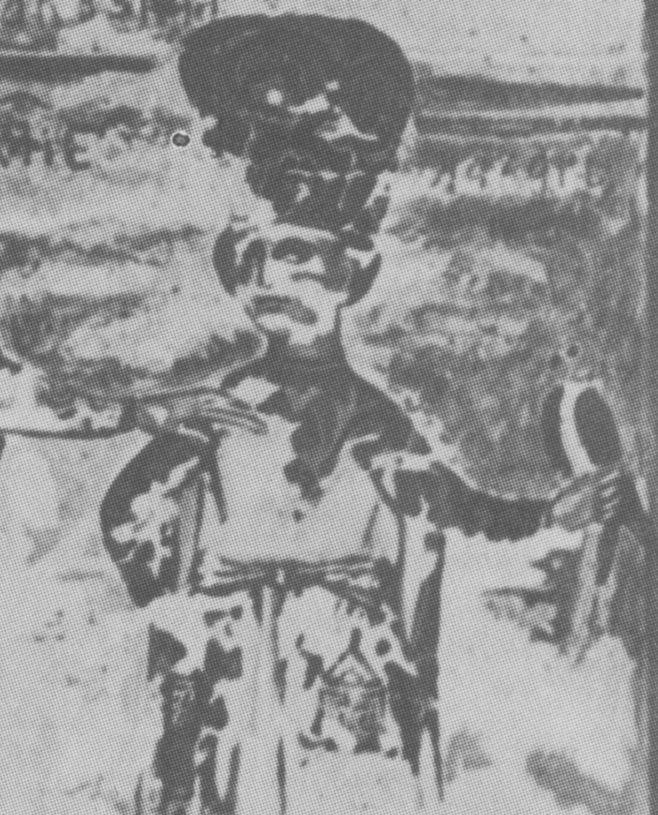
- Lazar Branković from a charter held in Esphigmenou Monastery, Mount Athos

Despot of Serbia
- Reign: 1456–1458
- Predecessor: Đurađ Branković
- Successor: Stefan Branković
- Born: c. 1421
- Died: 20 February 1458
- Spouse: Helena Palaiologina, Despotess of Serbia
- Issue: Maria of Serbia, Queen of Bosnia; Milica, Despotess of Epirus; Jerina, Duchess of San Pietro in Galatina
- House: Branković
- Father: Đurađ Branković
- Mother: Eirene Kantakouzene
- Religion: Eastern Orthodox

Lazar Branković (Serbian Cyrillic: Лазар Бранковић; c. 1421 – 20 February 1458) was Despot of Serbia from 1456 to 1458. He was the third son of Despot Đurađ Branković and his wife, Eirene Kantakouzene. He died without sons, and was succeeded by his elder brother, Despot Stefan Branković.

== Biography ==
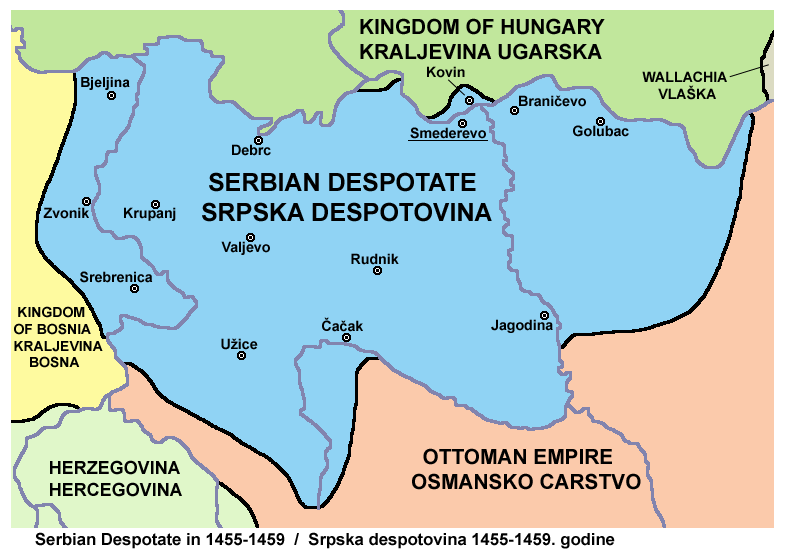
Serbian Despotate, 1455–1459

Both Grgur and Stefan, his older brothers, were blinded by orders of Ottoman sultan Murad II in 1441. Lazar apparently became the heir to their father as the only son not to be handicapped. Đurađ died on 24 December 1456. Lazar succeeded him as planned.

According to Fine, his brief reign mostly included family quarrels with his mother and siblings. In 1457, Lazar gave an oath of subservience to Mehmed II, son and successor of Murad II. Fine considers this to be an attempt to prevent an Ottoman invasion. His only other decision of consequence was to appoint Mihailo Anđelović, a member of the Angelos family, as his chief official. Mihailo briefly served as head of a regency council following the death of his lord.

Lazar died on 20 February 1458. George Sphrantzes recorded the date but not the cause.

== Family ==
Lazar and his relations are named in "Dell'Imperadori Constantinopolitani", a manuscript held in the Vatican Library. The document is also known as the "Massarelli manuscript" because it was found in the papers of Angelo Massarelli (1510–1566). Masarelli is better known as the general secretary of the Council of Trent, who recorded the daily occurrings of the council.

The Massarelli manuscript names him as a son of Đurađ Branković and Eirene Kantakouzene. "The Byzantine Lady: Ten Portraits 1250-1500" (1994) by D. M. Nicol questioned his maternity, suggesting Đurađ had a prior marriage to a daughter of John IV of Trebizond. However his theory presented no sources and failed to take into account that John IV was born between 1395 and 1417. He was unlikely to be a grandparent by the 1410s.

On 11 September 1429, Đurađ made a donation to Esphigmenou Monastery at Mount Athos. The charter for the document names his wife Irene and five children. The Masarelli manuscript also names the same five children of Đurađ and Eirene. Other genealogies mention a sixth child, Todor Branković. He could be a child who died young and thus not listed with his siblings.

The oldest sibling listed in the Massarelli document was Grgur Branković. The 1429 document mentions him with the title of Despot. According to Fine, Grgur was appointed governor of territories of southern Serbia associated to the House of Branković. He was reportedly appointed by Murad II of the Ottoman Empire in 1439. In April 1441, Grgur was accused of plotting against Murad and his governorship terminated. He was imprisoned in Amasya and blinded on 8 May 1441. According to Miklosich, Grgur and his brothers co-signed a charter by which Đurađ confirmed the privileges of the Republic of Ragusa. The charter was dated to 17 September 1445. According to the "Europäische Stammtafeln: Stammtafeln zur Geschichte der Europäischen Staaten" (1978) by Detlev Schwennicke, Grgur retired to a monastery under the monastic name "German". According to Fine, Grgur resurfaced in 1458, claiming the succession of the vacant throne of Serbia for himself or his son. The Massarelli manuscript mentioned Grgur as unwed. Later genealogies name his wife as "Jelisaveta". Vuk Grgurević, a son of Grgur, was later a titular Serbian despot (1471–1485). He was possibly an illegitimate.

The Massarelli manuscript next names an older sister of Lazar, Mara Branković. She was one of the wives of Murad II. Then are listed Stefan Branković and "Cantacuzina", a sister with the Latinized version of their mother's last name. Later genealogies give her name as Katarina. She married Ulrich II of Celje. Lazar is listed fifth and last, the youngest child of the marriage.

== Marriage and children ==
In 1446, Lazar married Helena Palaiologina of Morea. She was a daughter of Thomas Palaiologos, Ruler of Morea, and Catherine Zaccaria of the Principality of Achaea. They had three daughters:

- Helen (Mary), wife of King Stephen Tomašević of Bosnia.
- Milica, wife of Leonardo III Tocco of Epirus.
- Jerina, wife of Gjon Kastrioti II

== Sources ==
- Babinger, Franz (1978). Hickman, William C. (ed.). Mehmed the Conqueror and His Time. Translated by Manheim, Ralph. Princeton University Press.
- Ćirković, Sima (2004). The Serbs. Malden: Blackwell Publishing. ISBN 9781405142915.
- Fine, John V. A. (1994) [1987]. The Late Medieval Balkans: A Critical Survey from the Late Twelfth Century to the Ottoman Conquest. Ann Arbor, Michigan: University of Michigan Press. ISBN 978-0-472-10079-8.
- Fotić, Aleksandar (2008a). "Branković family". Encyclopedia of the Ottoman Empire. New York: Infobase Publishing. pp. 93–94.
- Fotić, Aleksandar (2008b). "Serbia". Encyclopedia of the Ottoman Empire. New York: Infobase Publishing. pp. 517–519.
- Ivanović, Miloš (2018). "The Nobility of the Despotate of Serbia between Ottoman Empire and Hungary (1457-1459)". Secular Power and Sacral Authority in Medieval East-Central Europe. Amsterdam: Amsterdam University Press. pp. 167–177. ISBN 9789462981669.
- Miklosich, Franz (1858), Monumenta Serbica Spectantia Historiam Serbiae, Bosniae, Ragusi, CCCL, p. 433
- Nicol, Donald M. (1968). The Byzantine Family of Kantakouzenos (Cantacuzenus) ca. 1100-1460: A Genealogical and Prosopographical Study. Washington: Dumbarton Oaks Center for Byzantine Studies.
- Schwennicke, Detlev (1978), Europäische Stammtafeln: Stammtafeln zur Geschichte der Europäischen Staaten, vol. 3, p. 180
- Sedlar, Jean W. (1994). East Central Europe in the Middle Ages, 1000-1500. Seattle: University of Washington Press. ISBN 9780295800646.
- Spremić Momčilo (2013). "Despot Lazar Branković". Zbornik radova Vizantološkog instituta. 50 (2): 899–912. doi:10.2298/ZRVI1350899S.

== See also ==
- List of Serbian monarchs

Regnal titles
Preceded by Đurađ Branković	Serbian Despot; 1456–1458	Succeeded by Stefan Branković
