= Maria of Serbia, Queen of Bosnia =

Maria of Serbia
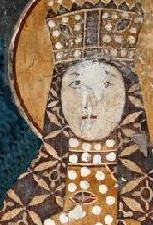
- Maria of Serbia, fresco from Serbian Orthodox Church of St. Achillius, Serbia

Queen consort of Bosnia
- Tenure: 10 July 1461 – 5 June 1463

Despoina consort of Serbia
- Tenure: 1 April 1459 – 20 June 1459
- Born: c. 1447; Smederevo, Serbia
- Died: c. 1500; Çorlu, Ottoman Empire
- Spouse: Stephen Tomašević, King of Bosnia
- House: Branković
- Father: Lazar Branković, Despot of Serbia
- Mother: Helena Palaiologina

Maria of Serbia (Serbian Cyrillic: Мара Бранковић, romanized: Mara Branković; c. 1447 – c. 1500), christened Helena (Serbian Cyrillic: Јелена, romanized: Jelena), was the last queen of Bosnia and despoina of Serbia. As the eldest daughter of the deceased despot of Serbia, Lazar Branković, the 12-year-old Helena was given in marriage to the Bosnian prince Stephen Tomašević in 1459. She then took the name Maria, while her husband obtained the title to Serbia through her. The country was lost to the Ottomans within a few months, and the couple fled to Bosnia. Maria's husband ascended the Bosnian throne in 1461, but two years later the kingdom too fell to the Ottomans and he was executed. The widowed queen avoided capture by fleeing to the coast. Having spent a few years in Venetian Dalmatia and possibly Hungary, Maria settled in Ottoman Greece at the court of her aunts Mara and Kantakouzene, where she spent her life in a string of conflicts and legal disputes with Kantakouzene, the Republic of Ragusa, and the Athonite monasteries.

== Youth ==
Maria was the eldest of three children born to Lazar Branković, son of the despot of Serbia, Đurađ Branković. Her mother was Lazar's wife, Helena Palaiologina. Born probably in 1447, Maria was christened Helena. Two sisters followed her: Milica and Irene.

Lazar succeeded his father as despot on 24 December 1456, but his reign was cut short by his death on 28 January 1458. Despoina Helena and Lazar's brother Stefan seized power and began negotiating a marriage between her eldest daughter and Stephen Tomašević, the elder surviving son of King Thomas of Bosnia. The intent was to consolidate an alliance against the threat of the expanding Ottoman Empire, which had already reduced the Despotate of Serbia to a strip of land governed from the Smederevo Fortress. Stephen Tomašević arrived to Smederevo during the Holy Week of 1459, taking over the fortress and the government on 21 March. The marriage was celebrated on 1 April, the first Sunday following Easter. The bride soon afterwards joined the Catholic Church and adopted the name Maria.

== Marriage ==
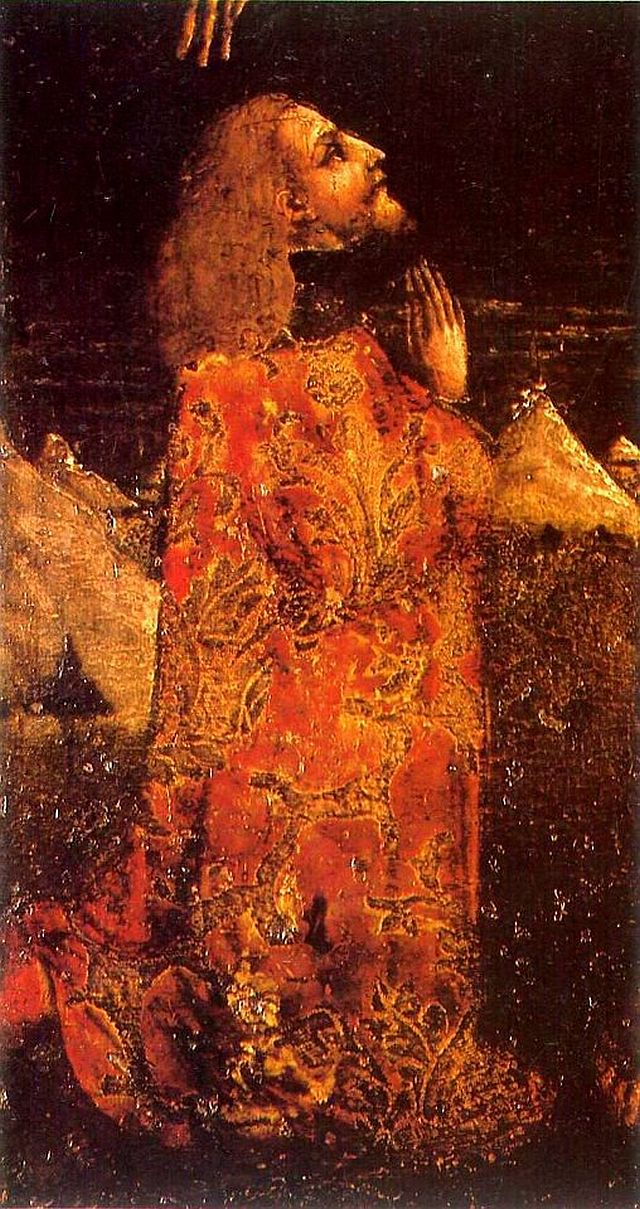
King Stephen, Maria's husband

Stephen Tomašević's reign in Serbia was short-lived. The Ottoman sultan Mehmed the Conqueror regarded the arrangement as an offense to his rights as overlord of Serbia. On 20 June 1459, Ottoman forces captured Smederevo without a struggle and proceeded to annex the remnants of the Serbian state to their realm. Stephen and Maria fled to Bosnia, seeking refuge at the court of his father in Jajce. Maria carried with her the relics of Saint Luke the Evangelist, her precious family heirloom. Upon the death of King Thomas in the summer of 1461, Maria's husband ascended as king of Bosnia. Maria became the new queen consort, with her stepmother-in-law Catherine possibly retiring from the court as queen dowager.

Maria's queenship did not last long either; in 1462, her husband made a fatal decision of refusing to pay tribute to the Ottomans, who started preparing an attack which ended the independent Kingdom of Bosnia. Following the Ottoman invasion in May 1463, the royal family appears to have decided to split and flee towards the neighbouring Croatia and Dalmatia in different directions to confuse and mislead the attackers. King Stephen, who had sent Maria to Dalmatia along with Saint Luke's relics, was captured and executed. The two queens, Maria and Catherine, were the only members of the royal family to escape the invaders and both eventually reached the territories of the Republic of Ragusa. The 16th century chronicler Mavro Orbini wrote that Queen Maria was captured by the ban of Croatia, Pavao Špirančić, during her journey to the coast, but this is unlikely because Pavao himself was in Turkish captivity around that time.

== Years of wandering ==
Maria, in her haste to avoid falling into Ottoman hands, mislaid the relics of Saint Luke. Bosnian Franciscan friars retrieved them and headed towards Ragusa, but were intercepted in Poljice by Ivaniš Vlatković, a local nobleman and friend of the queen, who refused to let them pass without her permission. This angered Ragusa, which demanded that Ivaniš surrender the relics to them. On 9 July, the republic's authorities issued a decree allowing the queen to take refuge on one of their islands. The decree also made reference to an important issue the Ragusans wanted to discuss with her, most likely the sale of the relics. The Republic of Venice also expressed interest in Maria's heirloom, but she was gravely offended in August when Venetian authorities miserly tried to question the authenticity of the relics. The Venetians eventually succeeded in concluding a sale through her deputy, Ivaniš Vlatković. She regretted the transaction after the Hungarian king Matthias Corvinus offered her three or four towns in exchange for the relics, but her attempt to have Ivaniš retrieve them in late August failed. Both Ivaniš and Maria were rewarded by Venice, with the queen being allowed to settle in the Benedictine Monastery of St. Stephen under the Pines near Spalato.

While residing in the monastery, Queen Maria received visits from Bosnians and Hungarians that made the Venetian authorities grow suspicious. They soon instructed the government of Spalato to recommend moving her to Sebenico (now Šibenik, Croatia) or to an island on the grounds of poor living conditions in the monastery, with the intention of permanently removing her from their territory. Unlike her stepmother-in-law (and even the Hungarian king), the 16-year-old Queen Maria refrained from claiming the patrimony of Bosnian kings during her exile in Dalmatia and Ragusa.

Possibly having spent some time in Hungary after leaving Dalmatia, Queen Maria settled in Ottoman Greece. She probably joined her paternal aunts, Mara (Mehmed's esteemed and influential stepmother) and Kantakouzene, on their estate near Serres. A conflict which erupted in 1476 between Maria and Kantakouzene led to the latter's brief imprisonment after the queen complained to Mehmed. The strife may have caused the queen to move to Constantinople, the Ottoman capital, where she enjoyed protection of Mehmed and his successor, Bayezid II. She spent years "slandering and intriguing against her closest relatives", as well as suing everyone from whom she could profit.

== Lawsuits and frauds ==
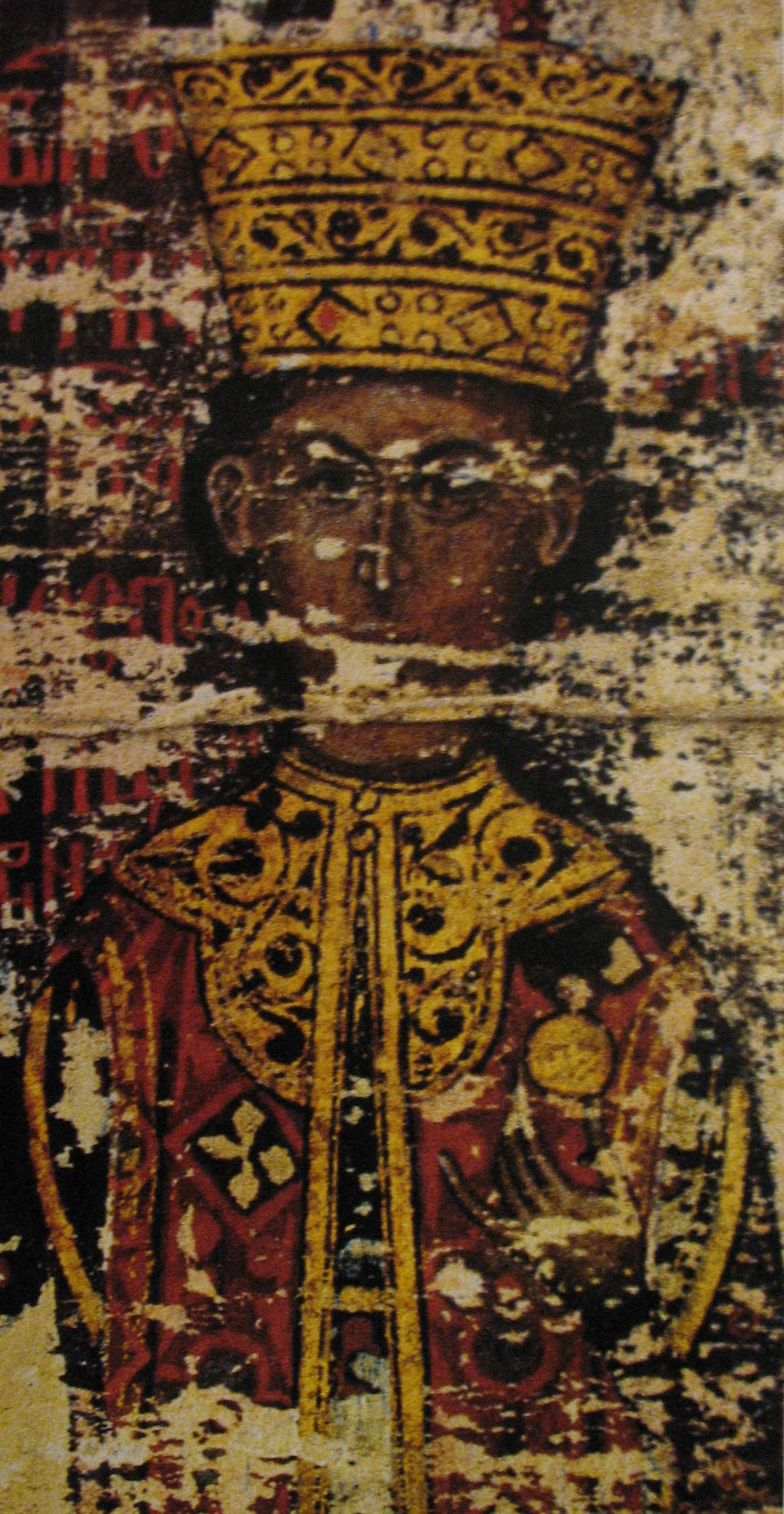
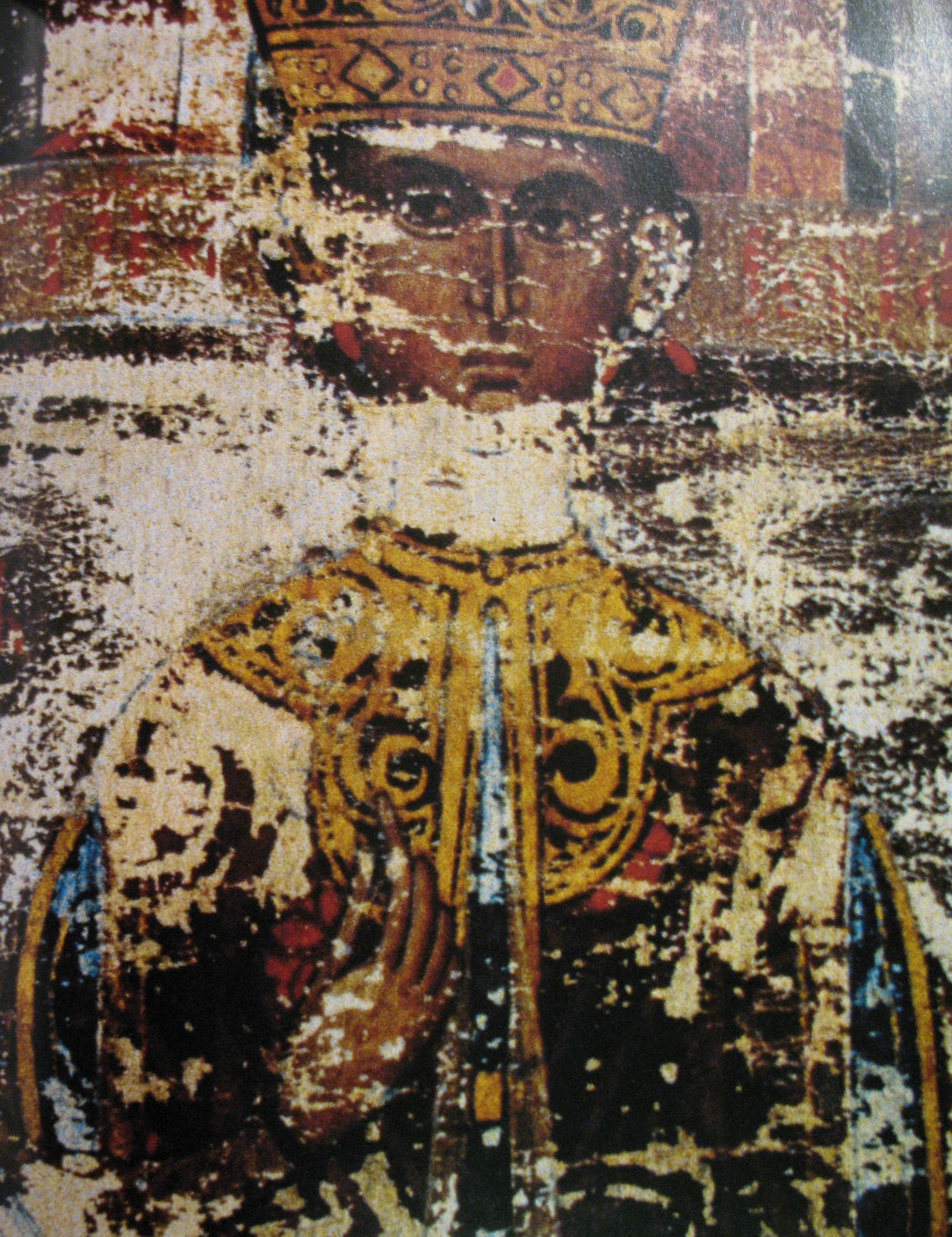
Maria's aunts Mara and Kantakouzene

In October 1484, Queen Maria approached the Sublime Porte to ask for the sultan's help in reclaiming a third of her paternal grandfather's deposit in Ragusa, which she insisted had not been returned to her father. Bayezid wrote to Ragusa and sent an envoy to bring the gold, but the Ragusans responded with a letter proving that the deposit had been returned to Lazar. Maria, however, disputed the authenticity of her father's seal, and Bayezid sided with her. It is not known whether the Ragusans obeyed Bayezid's command to send the gold to the queen, but there is plenty of evidence against her allegations in the letters of her father and uncle.

Upon the deaths of her aunts Mara and Kantakouzene in 1487 and 1490 respectively, Maria inherited their possessions in accordance with the Islamic Sharia law. She immediately launched a claim to icons left by Mara to the Christian monastery of Great Lavra on Mount Athos. Since her gender precluded her from accessing the holy mountain, it took Bayezid's intervention in 1492 for her to receive the icons. Shortly afterwards, she called to Sharia court the monks of Xeropotamou Monastery, alleging that one of them stole money from her aunt Kantakouzene while in her service, but could not prove this.

In c. 1495, Maria became involved in another legal dispute with Ragusa, this time concerning the tribute of Ston. The tribute had been paid by Ragusa to Serbian rulers since the reign of Stefan Dušan, but the income was ceded to the Monastery of Saint Archangels Michael and Gabriel in Jerusalem. Her aunt Mara reclaimed the income after the monastery was closed, and after her death it was managed by Kantakouzene. Maria decided to claim it as her aunts' legal heir, but the Athonite monasteries of Chilandar and Saint Paul's cited her aunts' non-formalized bequest.

It is not clear why Maria enjoyed such strong support of the sultans in her various conflicts and plain frauds. An explanation might be offered by the narrative of her relative Theodore Spandounes, who lived for some time with her aunts and whose family maintained close relations with the Branković dynasty. He wrote that Queen Maria married a sipahi with whom she had no children, but went so far as to claim that she was captured by the Turks in Bosnia and forced into the marriage, which is evidently untrue.

Queen Maria, described straightforwardly by the monks she sued as an "evil woman", died c. 1500, when Chilandar and Saint Paul's were recorded as having secured the income. She is believed to have died in Çorlu and to have been buried in a local church along with her maternal uncle, Manuel Palaiologos.

== Family tree ==
Đurađ Branković	Irene Kantakouzene	Thomas Palaiologos	Caterina Zaccaria
Murad II	Mara Branković	Kantakouzene Branković	Lazar Branković	Helena Palaiologina	Manuel Palaiologos	Tomaš Kotromanić	Katarina Kosača
Mehmed II	Marija/Jelena Branković	Stjepan Kotromanić
Bayezid II

== Bibliography ==
- Babinger, Franz (1992). Mehmed the Conqueror and His Time. USA: Princeton University Press. ISBN 0-691-01078-1.
- Fine, John Van Antwerp Jr. (1975). The Bosnian Church: Its Place in State and Society from the Thirteenth to the Fifteenth Century. Saqi. ISBN 0914710036.
- Fine, John Van Antwerp (1994), The Late Medieval Balkans: A Critical Survey from the Late Twelfth Century to the Ottoman Conquest, University of Michigan Press, ISBN 0472082604
- Mahinić, Senja (2014), "Životni put posljednje bosanske kraljice Mare nakon propasti Bosanskog kraljevstva", Radovi (in Serbo-Croatian), Filozofski fakultet u Sarajevu
- Regan, Krešimir (2010), Bosanska kraljica Katarina : pola stoljeća Bosne, 1425-1478 (in Serbo-Croatian), Zagreb: Naklada Breza, ISBN 978-9-5370-3655-3
- Tošić, Đuro (2002), "Posljednja bosanska kraljica Mara (Jelena)", Zbornik za istoriju Bosne i Hercegovine 2 (in Serbo-Croatian), Serbian Academy of Sciences and Arts, pp. 29–60

Maria of Serbia Branković dynasty Born: 1447 Died: 1498
Royal titles
Preceded by Catherine of St Sava	Queen consort of Bosnia; 1461 – 1463	Ottoman conquest
Vacant Title last held by Helena Palaiologina	Despoina consort of Serbia; 1459	Ottoman conquest
