= Helena Palaiologina, Despotess of Serbia =

Helena Palaiologina
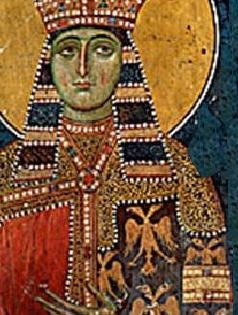
- Helena Palaiologina, Despotess of Serbia

Despotess of Serbia
- Tenure: 24 December 1456 – 20 January 1458
- Born: 1431; Despotate of the Morea, Byzantine Empire
- Died: 7 November 1473 (aged 42); Leukas
- Spouse: Lazar Branković, Despot of Serbia
- Issue: Jelena Brankovic; Milica Branković; Jerina Brankovic
- House: Palaiologos; Branković
- Father: Thomas Palaiologos, Despot of Morea
- Mother: Catherine Zaccaria
- Religion: Eastern Orthodoxy

Helena Palaiologina (Greek: Ελένη Παλαιολογίνα; Serbian: Јелена Палеолог/Jelena Paleolog; 1431 – 7 November 1473) was a Byzantine princess who married Serbian Despot Lazar Branković, who ruled from 1456 until his death in 1458. After Smederevo fell to the Ottoman Turks on 20 June 1459, she fled Serbia for the Greek island of Lefkada, where she converted to Catholicism.

She is not to be confused with her grandmother, Helena Dragaš, a Serbian princess who was the mother of the last two Eastern Roman Emperors and who became a nun and a Saint of the Eastern Orthodox Church.

== Family ==
Helena was born in the Despotate of the Morea in 1431, the eldest daughter and child of Thomas Palaiologos, Despot of the Morea and Catherine Zaccaria of Achaea. She had two younger brothers, Andreas Palaiologos and Manuel Palaiologos, and a sister, Zoe, who would become the wife of Ivan III of Russia. Her maternal grandparents were Centurione II Zaccaria and an unnamed Byzantine lady by the Asen Palaiologos houses. Her first cousin, also Helena Palaiologina, became Queen consort of Cyprus.

== Marriage and issue ==
In October 1446 she left Glarentza, Peloponnese, for Semendria, Serbia, where she married Lazar Branković, son of Lord Đurađ Branković that December. On 24 December 1456, Helena became Despotitsa of Serbia, when Lazar succeeded his father to the despotate. They had three surviving daughters:

- Jelena Branković (upon her marriage she changed her name to Maria) (1447–1498), married King Stephen Tomašević of Bosnia; she might have later been forced into the harem of a Turkish general.
- Milica Branković (died 1464), married Leonardo III Tocco, Ruler of Epirus, by whom she had one son; she died in childbirth.
- Jerina Branković, wife of Gjon Kastrioti II.

== De facto ruler of Serbia ==
When her husband died after a year of rule, Mihailo Anđelović was chosen to lead a council, becoming the de facto ruler of Serbia (Voyvoda). Palaiologina, together with her brother-in-law, Stefan Branković, Palaiologina and Branković assumed control as joint de facto rulers of Serbia. In March 1458, when the Ottomans invaded Smederevo, and local rebel Serbs took Anđelović prisoner. In order to strengthen her position, she sought an ally in King Stephen Thomas of Bosnia, through the arranged marriage to his eldest son, Stephen Tomašević, of her eldest daughter, Helena-Maria, which took place on 1 April 1459.

On 20 June 1459, the Ottomans launched a major assault against Smederevo and succeeded in taking the city, effectively ending the despotate in Serbia. Palaiologina was compelled to leave and, in April 1462, she arrived in Ragusa (modern Dubrovnik), where she stayed for a year. During this time, she arranged the marriage of her daughter Milica. In June 1463 she moved to Corfu, joining her mother and brothers who had taken refuge there. Eventually she came to live on the Greek island of Leukas, where she died 7 November 1473, having become a nun and taking the name Hypomone.

== See also ==
- List of Serbian consorts

== Sources ==
- Fine, John V. Jr. (1994). The Late Medieval Balkans: A Critical Survey from the Late Twelfth Century to the Ottoman Conquest. Vol. I. The University of Michigan Press.
- Nicol, Donald M. (1968). "The Byzantine Family of Kantakouzenos (Cantacuzenus) ca. 1100-1460: a Genealogical and Prosopographical Study". Dumbarton Oaks Papers. Dumbarton Oaks, Trustees for Harvard University.
- Stavrides, Theoharis (2016). "From Byzantine Aristocracy to Ottoman Ruling Elite: Mahmud Pasha Angelovic and His Christian Circle, 1458-1474". In Isom-Verhaaren, Christine; Schull, Kent (eds.). Living in the Ottoman Realm: Empire and Identity, 13th to 20th Centuries. Indiana University Press.

Royal titles
Preceded by Irene Kantakouzene	Despotess of Serbia; 1456–1458	Succeeded by Maria Branković
