= Ottoman conquest of the Morea =

End of the despotates

The Despotate of the Morea in 1450, divided between the two brothers, Despots Thomas and Demetrios Palaiologos

The Ottoman conquest of the Morea occurred in two phases, in 1458 and 1460, and marked the end of the Despotate of the Morea, one of the last remnants of the Byzantine Empire, which had been extinguished in the Fall of Constantinople in 1453.

The Despotate of the Morea had been founded as an autonomous appanage ruled by members of the Byzantine imperial Palaiologos dynasty. During the 14th and 15th centuries, it was the scene of the last flourishing of Byzantine culture, but in the 1420s it was repeatedly attacked by Ottoman raiders under Turahan Bey, and was reduced to a tributary vassal by Sultan Murad II in 1446. From 1449, it was ruled by the brothers Demetrios Palaiologos and Thomas Palaiologos, who were engaged in a constant rivalry with one another: they divided the Morea peninsula among themselves, and neglected the payment of tribute to the Sultan. Having lost his patience with the quarreling brothers, and determined to avoid the Morea being used as a springboard for a Western crusade against him following his capture of Constantinople, Sultan Mehmed II invaded the peninsula in May 1458. While part of his forces besieged the Acrocorinth, the rest ravaged the peninsula. After the fall of the Acrocorinth, the two Palaiologoi brothers capitulated. Acrocorinth, Thomas' capital, Patras, and much of the northern part of the peninsula came under direct Ottoman rule; the Palaiologoi were left as tributary rulers in the southern half, which included the Despotate's capital, Mystras.

As soon as the Sultan left, the quarrel between the two brothers resumed, with Demetrios moving to a pro-Ottoman stance and Thomas, who had lost most of his domain, increasingly looking for Western assistance. Thomas rose in revolt in January 1459, leading Demetrios to call for Ottoman assistance from the governors installed in the northern peninsula. Mehmed II tried to mediate between the brothers, but the civil war resumed soon after. Bolstered by Italian reinforcements, Thomas gained the upper hand; Demetrios withdrew to Monemvasia and sent envoys to beg the Sultan for his assistance, while Pope Pius II tried to rally Western support for an anti-Ottoman crusade at the Council of Mantua. In April 1460, Mehmed II led his second invasion of the Morea. He first secured the surrender of Demetrios and the remaining territories under the latter's control, including Mystras, before moving west to the lands held by Thomas, who fled to Corfu with his family. The last sources of resistance in the peninsula were subdued in July 1461, and the Morea became an Ottoman province. Ottoman rule would be challenged during the First Ottoman–Venetian War, which broke out in 1463, and in which the Republic of Venice would unsuccessfully attempt to capture the peninsula; and the remaining Venetian coastal strongholds would be gradually reduced by 1540. Apart from a period of Venetian rule in 1685–1715, the Morea would remain in Ottoman hands until the outbreak of the Greek War of Independence in 1821.

== Background: the Despotate of the Morea and the Ottoman Empire ==
After the Fourth Crusade (1203–1204), the Morea (Peloponnese) peninsula in southern Greece was conquered by Western European Crusaders ('Franks') and became the Principality of Achaea. The Republic of Venice, which also claimed dominion over the Morea by virtue of the Partitio Romaniae, accommodated itself to the situation and kept for itself only the two strategic forts of Modon and Coron in Messenia, on the southwestern tip of the peninsula. Byzantine rule was restored over the southeastern part of the Morea, around the fortress of Mystras, in 1262, and gradually expanded into the interior, at the expense of Achaea. In 1349, the Byzantine province of the Morea became a semi-autonomous appanage under a prince with the title of despot, who led his own administration and tax system; after 1380 the Despotate of the Morea was held by younger sons of the ruling Palaiologos dynasty. Constant warfare and Turkish raids on the coast and the interior severely depopulated the Morte countryside; to combat the lack of manpower, the despots encouraged the settlement of large numbers of Albanian migrants in the peninsula. The despots also faced frequent opposition from the Moreote nobility, who resented the arrival and placement in high office of people from outside the peninsula by the despots, as well as the imposition of new taxes and the curtailment of their autonomy by the despots' administration.

=== First wave of Ottoman expansion and its impact on the Morea ===
Map of the southern Balkans and western Anatolia in 1410. Ottoman and other Turkish territories are marked in shades of brown, Byzantine territory in pink, and Venetian and Venetian-influenced areas in green

Towards the end of the 14th century, the rapid expansion of the Ottoman Empire in the Balkans made the Ottomans a determining factor in Moreote politics. Already in 1387, the Ottoman general Evrenos Bey raided deep into the Morea, as far as the Venetian colonies of Modon and Coron. Despot Theodore I Palaiologos (r. 1383–1407) even swore vassalage to Sultan Murad I in the same year; and Theodore's quarrels with local magnates were used by Sultan Bayezid I to force him to hand over various fortresses in the Morea, whereupon Theodore broke off his vassalage. Further Ottoman raids followed in 1394–1395 and 1397, in which the Despot's army was defeated and the peninsula plundered. The mounting Ottoman threat led Theodore to sell the entire Despotate to the Knights Hospitaller in 1399, while the Venetians hoped to form a league of the Frankish and Byzantine rulers against the Ottoman threat, and fortify the peninsula at the Isthmus of Corinth by rebuilding the Hexamilion wall.

The Ottoman defeat at the Battle of Ankara in 1402 and the subsequent civil war of the Ottoman Interregnum removed the Ottoman threat for the immediate future, allowing Theodore to recover the Despotate from the Hospitallers in 1402–1404. In 1415–1416, Emperor Manuel II Palaiologos came to the Morea in person, refortifying the Hexamilion and imposing his authority over the local potentates; this was followed by a resurgence of Byzantine power in the peninsula, as Byzantine forces captured most of Messenia and threatened Patras. In the more peaceful period after 1402, the Despotate of the Morea prospered and saw a major flowering of late Byzantine culture; its capital, Mystras, attracted philosophers and scholars, and was endowed with numerous fine churches. Venice did not remain idle, either: in addition to northeastern fortresses of Nauplia and Argos, which it had acquired in 1388 and 1394 respectively, the Republic expanded its Messenian possessions by acquiring Pylos (Navarino or Port de Jonc) in 1423.

=== End of the Principality of Achaea and resurgence of the Ottoman threat ===
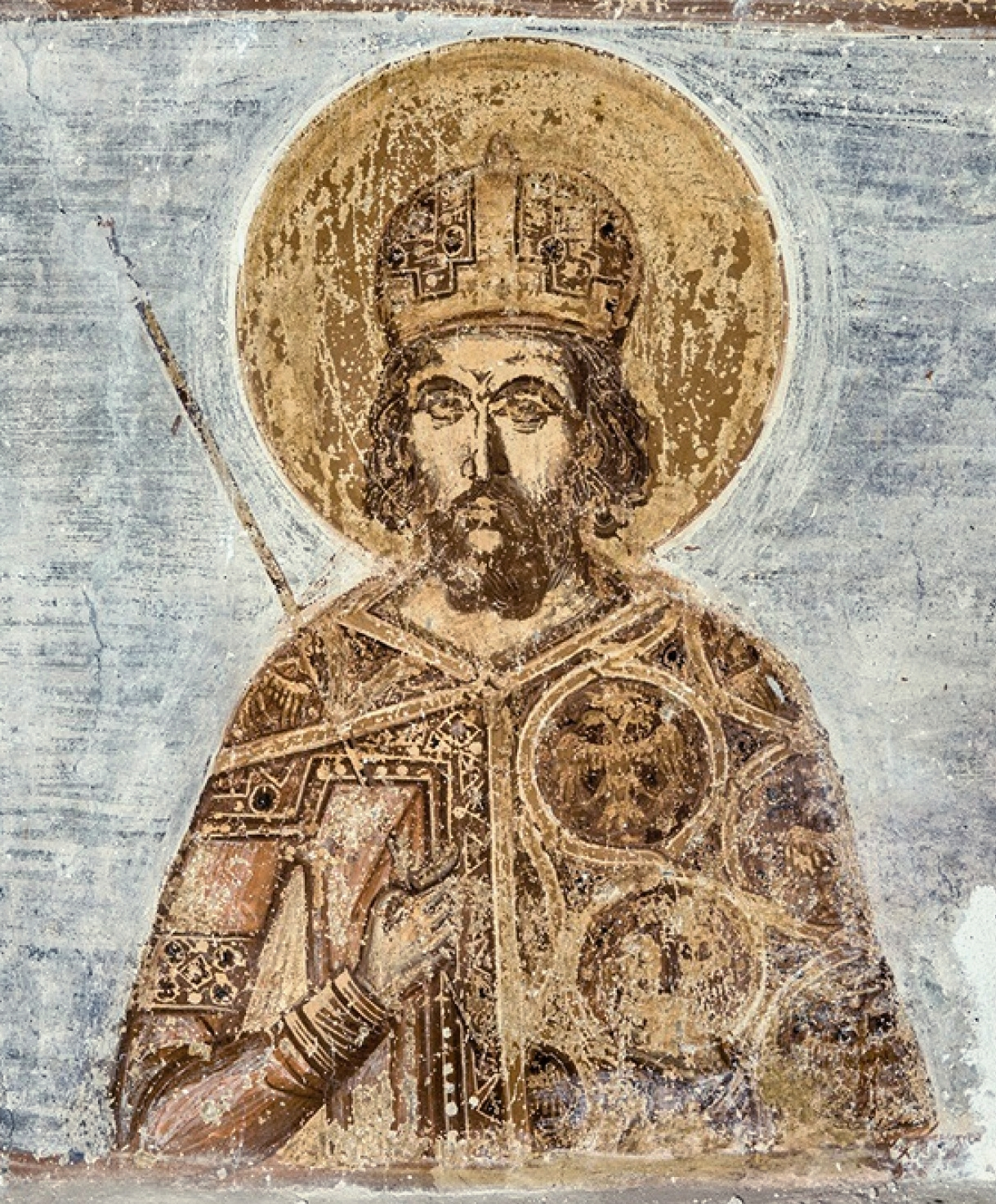
15th-century fresco of Constantine Palaiologos as emperor

In 1429–1432, a concerted Byzantine campaign finally ended the Principality of Achaea: Despot Constantine Palaiologos (later to rule as the last Byzantine emperor) seized Patras, while his brother, Despot Thomas Palaiologos, through a combination of force and marriage diplomacy seized the possessions of the last Prince of Achaea, Centurione II Zaccaria, the baronies of Chalandritsa and Messenian Arcadia. Apart from the Venetian possessions, all of the Morea was again in Byzantine hands. These successes were precarious, as the Ottoman threat revived at the same time: in 1423 the semi-autonomous Ottoman ruler of Thessaly, Turahan Bey, launched a devastating raid into the Morea, breaching the Hexamilion wall with ease. Another Ottoman raid in 1425 carried off thousands of Greek and Albanian Moreotes into slavery, and in 1431 Turahan returned, once again overcoming the Hexamilion defences. As the historian John Van Antwerp Fine Jr. commented, for now "the Ottomans were out for plunder and to soften up the area. They were not yet conquering towns or annexing any territory. But the earlier fate of Thessaly and that of most of Epirus in 1430-31 should have been a clear message to the Morea that its days were numbered."

In 1435, Despot Constantine tried to absorb the neighbouring Frankish Duchy of Athens, but his attempt faltered because the local barons preferred to become Ottoman vassals than risk expropriation at the hands of the Byzantines. The attempt was repeated in 1444, taking advantage of the Ottoman diversion north to face the Crusade of Varna: the Duke of Athens, Nerio II Acciaioli, recognized Byzantine suzerainty, and Constantine's forces marched on, restoring Byzantine rule up to southern Thessaly and the Vlach territories of the Pindus by the end of 1445. Following the defeat of the crusade, however, the Ottomans turned south again, and by November 1446 they stood once again before the Hexamilion; all Constantine's gains in Central Greece had been lost. The Venetians, angered because Constantine during his campaigns had captured the port of Vitrinitsa from them, refused any assistance. Negotiations failed, and the Ottomans attacked the Hexamilion. After two weeks, with the aid of artillery, the wall was stormed; the Moreote army disintegrated rather than confront them, and the Ottomans proceeded to lay waste to the Morea. Sixty thousand were carried off as slaves, and the Ottoman troops withdrew only after both Constantine and Thomas became vassals of the Sultan and promised not to rebuild the Hexamilion.

In January 1449, Constantine succeeded to the Byzantine throne in Constantinople and left the Morea, which was divided in two halves: Thomas kept the western half, while the younger Demetrios received the eastern half. The two brothers were practically strangers, having lived apart since early childhood; they quickly quarreled, not only over possession of the district of Skorta, but also on religious-ideological grounds: Thomas supported the union of the Byzantine Church with the Catholic Church, while Demetrios opposed it. The dispute led to open war, which lasted until Turahan Bey imposed a settlement on the two despots which left Skorta to Thomas but obliged him to hand over Kalamata and Messenia to Demetrios in exchange.

=== Mehmed II and the Despotate of the Morea ===
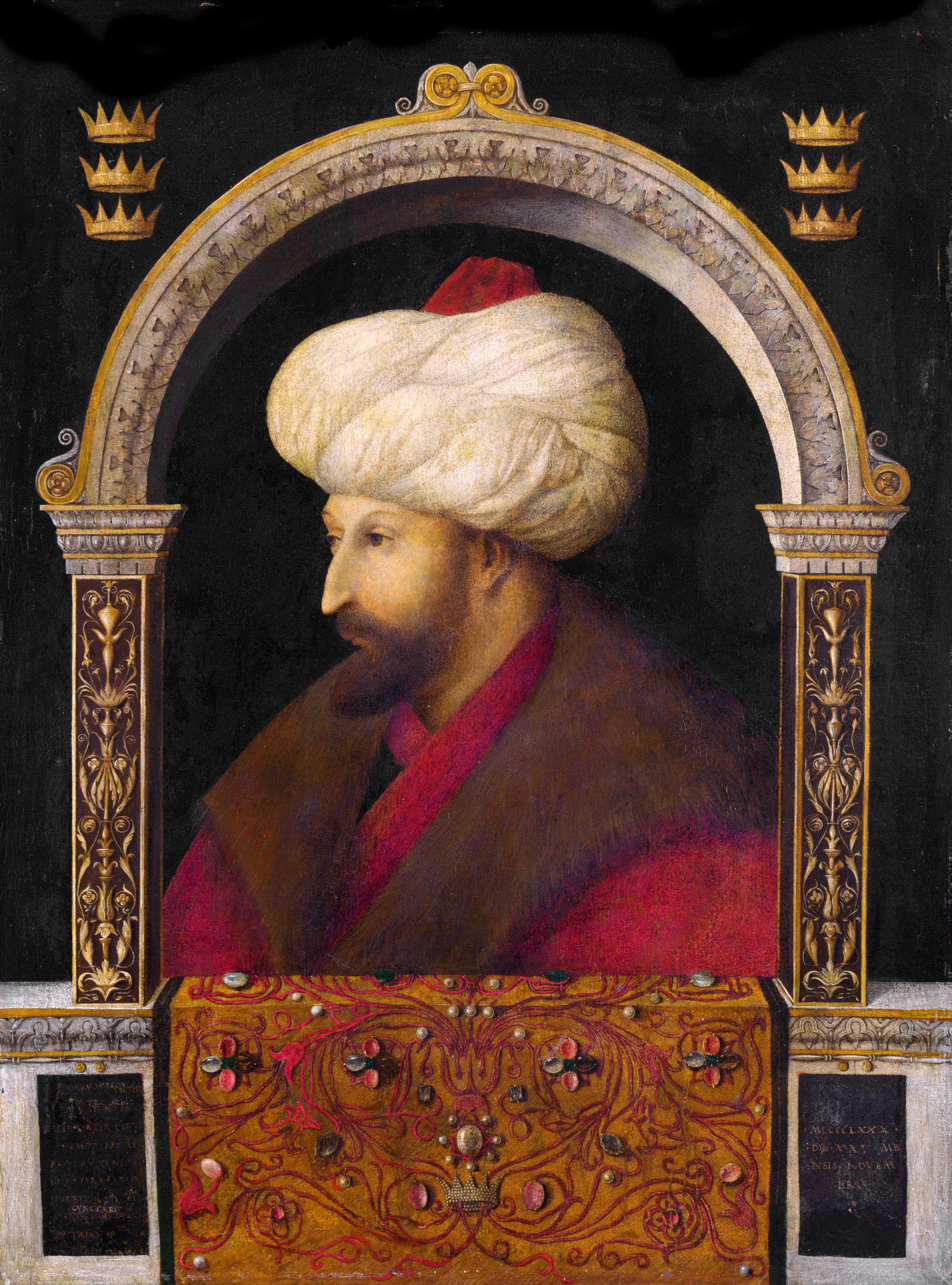
Portrait of Mehmed II by Gentile Bellini

In 1451, a new Ottoman sultan, Mehmed II, came to the throne, and immediately began preparations for a final assault on Constantinople. In order to prevent the despots from assisting Constantinople, in October 1452, Turahan led a large force into the Morea, broke through the Hexamilion, crisscrossed the peninsula almost at will, and wintered there. The only Byzantine success was the defeat and capture of Turahan's son Ahmed by Matthew Palaiologos Asen.

The fall of Constantinople on 29 May 1453 had great repercussions in the Peloponnese, and at first the two despots prepared to flee to Italy, before Mehmed II informed them that they could remain in office as tributary vassals. In autumn, a rebellion broke out against the unpopular despots by the Albanian immigrants, although it also found support among the native Greeks, and spread quickly: Thomas and Demetrios found themselves besieged in their capitals, Patras and Mystras. The rebels called for Venetian assistance, and although this did not materialize—the Republic was loath to be dragged into a potential conflict with the Ottomans—this alarmed the Sultan.

As the Sultan's vassals, the despots called upon Ottoman aid; first Turahan's son Ömer and then Turahan himself campaigned in the Morea, putting down the revolt. Turahan advised the two despots to compose their differences and rule well, and then departed the peninsula. At the same time, the tribute owed the Sultan by the despots was raised further still to 10,000 or 12,000 gold ducats each, while some local magnates used the opportunity to become direct subjects of the Sultan, bypassing the despots. The erosion of the brothers' authority also meant that taxes were frequently withheld, leading to their inability to pay the new, higher tribute; by 1458 they owed three years' worth of tribute money.

Even when faced with this situation, the two despots kept up their dispute. Not only that, but the two brothers independently pursued separate designs to receive help from Western Europe: Thomas sent the scholar John Argyropoulos, while Demetrios sent Frankoulios Servopoulos. Married to Catherine Zaccaria, daughter of the last Prince of Achaea, and a pro-Unionist, Thomas was the more pro-Western of the two, whereas Demetrios increasingly took a pro-Ottoman stance, or at least preferred to not risk the status quo, especially since his entreaties with Western rulers proved fruitless. News of this activity nevertheless reached Mehmed II, who, in the words of the Byzantinist Donald Nicol, "was astonished at the behaviour of the Despots Thomas and Demetrios. They were his sworn vassals. He had gone out of his way to keep them in power. Yet as soon as his back was turned he heard that they were plotting with the Pope, with the Duke of Milan and with the King of France to draw the western world into a crusade."

According to the contemporary historian Kritoboulos of Imbros, when Mehmed II placed the despots before the choice of paying the owed tribute or surrendering the Morea to him, the despots collected the money but kept it for themselves, possibly in hopes of a Western intervention, encouraged by the presence of a Papal squadron under Ludovico Trevisan in the Aegean. These hopes were in vain: despite strenuous efforts, Pope Callixtus III failed to rally the Western princes for anti-Ottoman crusade, or even at securing sufficient funds and troops for the Albanian warlord Skenderbeg, who was resisting Ottoman incursions into Albania at the time.

== Fall of the Morea ==
=== First Moreote campaign of Mehmed II (1458) ===
The despots' quarrels, infidelity, and inability to pay the promised tribute led Mehmed II to decide to campaign in the Morea. Preparations began in late 1457, and the Sultan set out at the head of his army from Adrianople in spring 1458. The Sultan stayed his march at Thessaly, to rest his army and, according to Kritoboulos, to give the despots time to send envoys and settle their affairs peacefully. In the event, only envoys from Thomas arrived, with 4,500 ducats, when the Ottoman army's scouts were already scouting the northern approaches to the Isthmus of Corinth.

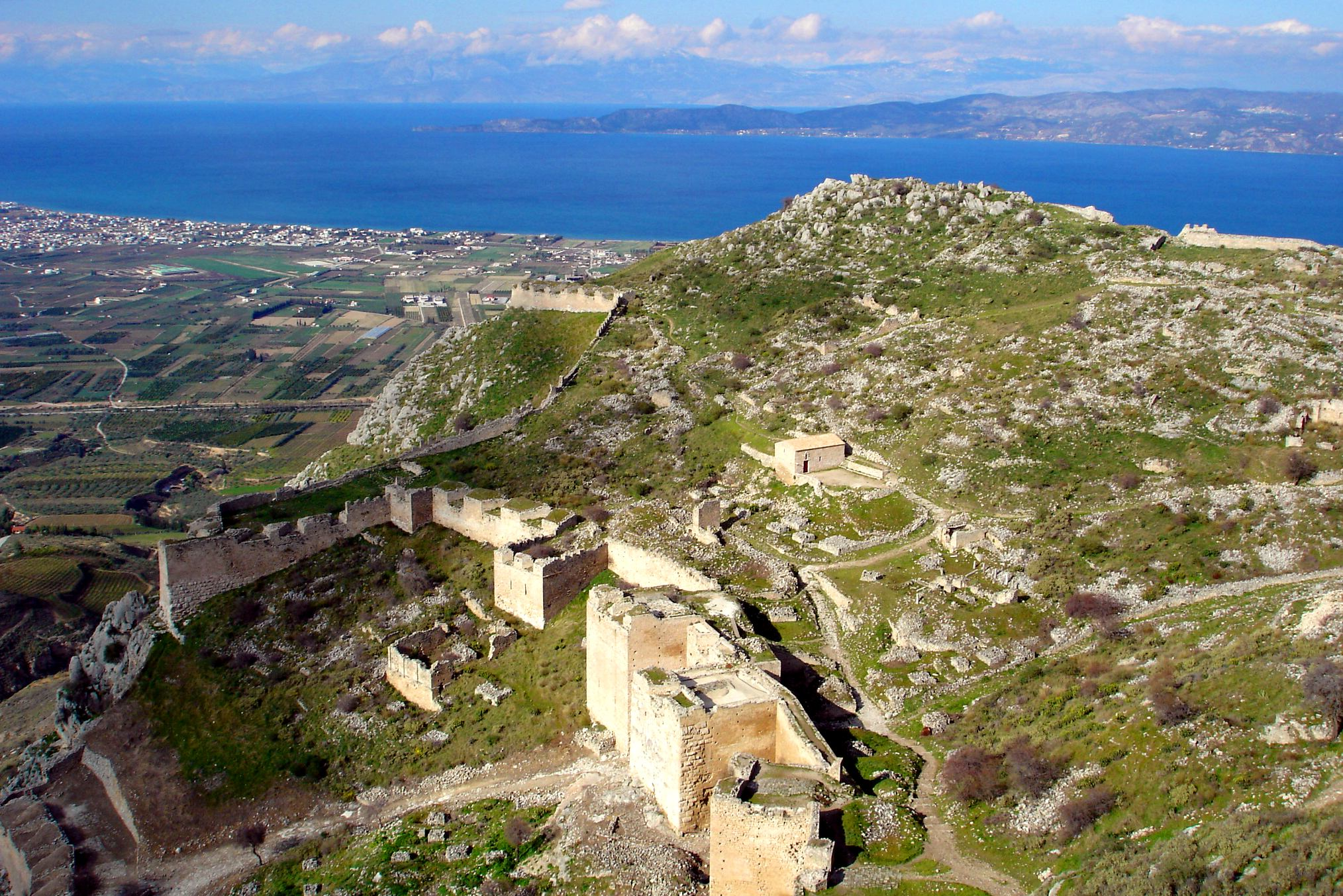
View from the top of the Acrocorinth, north towards the Gulf of Corinth

The Ottoman army entered the Morea on 15 May. With the Hexamilion destroyed, the Sultan's forces made for the Acrocorinth, which belonged to Demetrios' domains. Held by Nikephoros Loukanes, the fortress resisted, so the Sultan left his Anatolian troops to besiege the fortress, while he led the remainder of his army into the interior of the peninsula. The Sultan raided mostly the northern and western parts of the Morea, likely not by accident, as these were the domains of Thomas. Despite facing stiff resistance in some cases, within two months the Sultan captured many fortresses in Corinthia and the Argolid. The first target was the Albanian-populated town of Tarsos, which surrendered after a short siege. At Phlius, the local commander, Doxas, resisted until the Ottomans cut the castle's underground water supply and was forced to begin talks for surrender; but taking advantage of the lull in fighting, the Ottomans entered the castle through an unguarded section and massacred the garrison. Akova and Roupeli, which resisted until the Sultan almost gave up the siege, were next; and Mouchli was taken after a three-day siege, again after cutting its water supply.

The despots fled before the Sultan's advance: Thomas with his family went to the small port of Mantineia, and prepared to sail for Italy if the Ottomans approached. His brother Demetrios likewise found refuge in Monemvasia. Mehmed II considered attacking him there, but was dissuaded due to the necessity of first marching through the rough terrain of Laconia, which would make resupply difficult. The Ottoman army then moved northwest through the mountains towards Patras, the capital of Thomas' portion of the Despotate. The latter was deserted, leaving only a small garrison in its citadel, which capitulated after a brief siege. Appreciating the town's position, he sent messengers inviting its inhabitants to return and even promised a full remission of taxation for a few years. From Patras the Ottoman army followed the coast eastward again, capturing Vostitsa (modern Aigio) on the way, and arriving before the Acrocorinth four months after it had left.

The fortress, now led by Matthew Asen, who had entered it at night with seventy men and carrying supplies, repelled the Sultan's initial attacks. Mehmed II redeployed his troops to blockade it instead, while sending detachments to raid the surrounding region. As the supplies were exhausted, Asen gave way to the pleas of the local metropolitan bishop, who favoured a capitulation. On 6 August, Asen surrendered the fortress on terms: the garrison was allowed to depart, and the inhabitants were to be left in place rather than carried off into slavery. Acting on the despots' behalf, Asen also agreed a new treaty of vassalage: the territory conquered by Mehmed, corresponding to the northeastern third of the Morea, was to remain under Ottoman rule, while the remainder was left to the joint rule of the two despots, against an annual tribute of 3,000 gold pieces. The contemporary historian Sphrantzes also claims that it was only at this time that Patras was surrendered to the Ottomans, along with Kalavryta and Greveno.

The treaty was resented by the despots, especially Thomas, from whose domains most of the new Ottoman province was carved, including his own capital. Furthermore, by leaving the Acrocorinth in Ottoman hands, the Morea was left defenceless. Despite its onerous terms, the despots accepted it as fait accompli. After appointing Turahan's son Ömer as his governor in the Morea, Mehmed returned to Adrianople in early autumn. The Sultan carried off thousands of prisoners captured during his campaign, who were resettled in Constantinople and its suburbs, as part of Mehmed's efforts to restore his new capital to its former glory.

=== Civil war in the Morea (1459–1460) ===
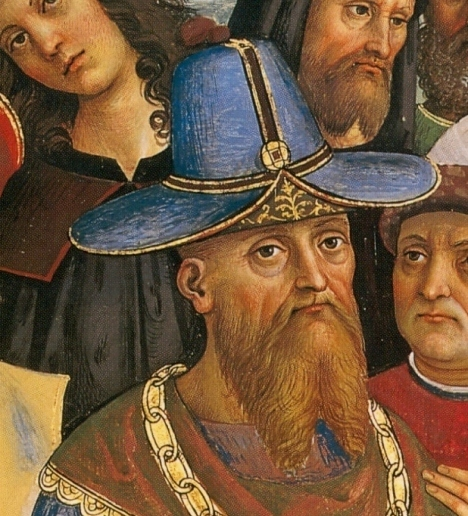
Despot Thomas Palaiologos, detail from a Pintoricchio fresco in the Siena Cathedral

The situation in the Morea did not improve after the Ottoman sultan left. The two despots drifted further apart, especially as Mehmed purposely pursued a marriage to Demetrios' only daughter Helena and Thomas, embittered over the loss of most of his territory, turned against Demetrios. At the same time, local magnates not only manipulated the two brothers against one another, but behaved more and more openly in defiance of the despots' authority, to the point of launching attacks on one another. As Nicol comments, "The district of the Morea that was under Turkish government was a model of order compared to the chaos that reigned in the Byzantine section".

In January 1459, Thomas rose in revolt, seeking to recover the fortresses that he had been forced to cede the previous year. As a result, medieval historians, followed by many modern ones, place the blame for the subsequent events on Thomas, and especially on the machinations of Nikephoros Loukanes, who is said to have counselled him to this move. In June 1459, Pope Pius II convened the Council of Mantua in an effort to foment another anti-Ottoman crusade. Despite the impassioned pleas of the Byzantine-born cardinal Bessarion, nothing came of the venture, as the Western European rulers were entangled in their own intrigues and quarrels. Bessarion even led a mission in Germany to gather support, but despite man promises, nothing materialized. Venice, which alone among them had immediate interests in the Morea, took the precaution of reinforcing its fortresses in the region but otherwise refused to commit themselves. Thomas sent envoys to the Council, pleading for the assistance of even a small Italian army. A force of three hundred infantry, paid for by the Pope and by the Duchess of Milan, were assembled and sent to the Morea.

With the aid of these mercenaries, Thomas attacked Patras. While the lower city fell, the citadel held out. The endeavour was abandoned as soon as an Ottoman relief force approached, while the Italians soon quarreled with the Greeks. Sphrantzes reports that Thomas did recover Kalavryta during this time, although a plot engineered by Loukanes to recapture the Acrocorinth did not succeed. Thomas also did not hesitate to attack his brother at the same time, and soon Demetrios' position was crumbling: several of his commanders began acting as de facto independent lords in the fortresses they governed. Many of these places—Kalamata, Zarnata, Leuktron and the rest of the Mani Peninsula—fell into Thomas' hands. At some point, Demetrios is rumoured to have offered the remainder of his lands to the Sultan, in exchange for a minor lordship elsewhere in the Ottoman Empire, likely the islands of Lemnos and Imbros.

Mehmed II, informed of events in part through Demetrios' envoys, did not intervene in person. He ordered Thomas to hand back his gains, but also sent Hamza Zenevisi south to replace Ömer Bey and lead his force against Thomas. After relieving Patras, Hamza pursued Thomas' troops to Leontari, where the Despot deployed his army to confront the Ottomans. The Ottoman cavalry quickly broke the Moreote lines, forcing the Despot's men to take refuge in the castle of Leontari. Only an outbreak of the plague in the Ottoman camp saved the castle, as the Ottomans withdrew. Demetrios in turn laid siege to Leontari, but the castle was relieved by Thomas, and Demetrios and his army had to retreat to Mystras. The chaos became complete when the local Albanians raided the lands of both factions, and the Ottoman garrisons in the northeast followed suit, laying waste to Arcadia, the heartland of the Morea.

Fearing another Ottoman invasion and bowing to popular pressure, the two brothers staged a public reconciliation at Kastritza near Sparta, but this was of brief duration. The hostilities were recommenced by Demetrios this time, apparently because Thomas still failed to return to him some of the captured castles. In early 1460, Thomas attacked Palaia Achaia near Patras with his own and the Italian troops, and even employed a cannon; lacking experienced artillerymen, its effect was minimal, and when Ottoman troops under Zagan Pasha arrived, the siege was abandoned. He then turned against his brother's domains. Although he failed to capture Mantineia, Thomas captured most of Laconia, and sent envoys to Mehmed II to ask for peace.

At the time, the Ottoman sultan was aiming to campaign east, against Uzun Hasan of the Aq Qoyunlu, and was thus prepared to grant peace in return for a return to the previous status quo (including handing over the forts captured from Demetrius), the immediate payment of 3,000 gold pieces, and come in person before an envoy of the Sultan at Corinth within twenty days. Thomas was inclined to comply, but could not force his magnates to hand over the forts they had occupied and appropriated for themselves, or hand over the money needed for the tribute. As a result, Mehmed II abandoned the campaign against Uzun Hasan and instead turned his army south against the Morea, with the aim of directly incorporating the rest of the peninsula into his empire.

=== Second Moreote campaign of Mehmed II (1460) ===
Map of the Morea (Peloponnese) and its principal locations in the late Middle Ages

Mehmed II set out from Adrianople in April or early May 1460, and was at Corinth 27 days later. There he summoned Demetrios to come within three days, but the Despot did not come, fearing that the Sultan would take Helena away from him; Demetrios sent his wife and daughter to Monemvasia, and dispatched Matthew Asen as an envoy in his stead. Asen was received in audience by the Sultan and the Grand Vizier, Mahmud Pasha Angelović, but Asen's pleas were rejected. Asen was arrested the next day, and Mehmed II proceeded south into Demetrios' domains. Mahmud Pasha was sent ahead towards Mystras, where Demetrios had ensconced himself in the town's castle. Mahmud called upon the Despot to surrender the castle, but he refused unless he received sureties for his safety. Demetrios is said to have planned to abscond to Monemvasia, but Kritoboulos at least regarded the whole affair as nothing but a hypocritical show put on for the public, since Demetrios had resigned himself to surrendering. On 30 May 1460, almost exactly seven years since the Fall of Constantinople, Mystras was handed over to the Ottomans.

Mehmed II arrived in Mystras on 31 May. The Sultan received Demetrios with honours, rising from his throne to greet him, seating the Despot at his right hand, and promising to recompense him with a new domain in Thrace. The Sultan sent envoys to Monemvasia, where Demetrios' wife and daughter had been brought for safety. The local governor, Manuel Palaiologos, agreed to hand them over, but refused to surrender the town itself; instead he acknowledged the Despot Thomas as his lord. Mehmed II spent four days at Mystras, ordering its fortifications strengthened and installing a garrison there, before moving on to conquer the remainder of the Morea, accompanied by Demetrios.

The town of Vordonia capitulated without resistance, but Kastritza initially resisted the Janissary attacks, but shortly after, bereft of water and food, they surrendered. The garrison were executed at the Sultan's orders, the women and children sold to slavery, and the town destroyed. Mehmed II then marched on Leontari and found it deserted, as its inhabitants had fled to the strongly fortified castle of Gardiki. Due to the lack of water and provisions, the overcrowding of the refugees, and the summer heat, the castle surrendered after only a day. 6,000 people are said to have been massacred in the aftermath; only its commander, Manuel Bochalis and his family escaped this fate, as they were relatives of Mahmud Pasha. The massacre at Gardiki spread terror in the Morea, and the governors of the other castles surrendered themselves to the Sultan. Mehmed II assembled some 10,000 inhabitants from these castles and sent them to the suburbs of Constantinople.

Thomas was unable to offer any meaningful resistance to the Ottoman advance; the Italian troops left him and, after engaging in some plundering of their own, departed for Italy. The Despot abandoned his residence, Kalamata, and made for the Venetian stronghold of Navarino. Urged by the Venetian authorities to leave, and with Mehmed II and his army approaching, Thomas set sail with his family for Corfu in July, taking the relics of Saint Andrew, patron of Patras, with him. From there he sailed on to Italy, reaching Ancona on 16 November. The Venetians treated the Sultan with studied friendliness, even though Ottoman cavalry raided the environs of Navarino and killed Venetian citizens. The Sultan renewed his agreements with Venice regarding the various fortresses the Republic held in the area, while Zagan Pasha operated further north and conquered Kalavryta, Chlemoutsi, and Santameri. Zagan Pasha's brutal treatment of the surrendered populations, which were killed or sold into slavery, became too much even for the Sultan, who feared that it might spark further resistance; he thus replaced Zagan with Hamza Zenevisi. Only one fortress held out against the Ottomans for a longer period: Salmenikon, whose commander, Graitzas Palaiologos, did not capitulate until July 1461. The sole fortress to escape capture was Monemvasia, whose inhabitants, on the advice of Thomas, placed themselves under the authority of the Pope, before submitting to Venice in 1464 in hopes of greater security from the Ottomans.

== Aftermath ==
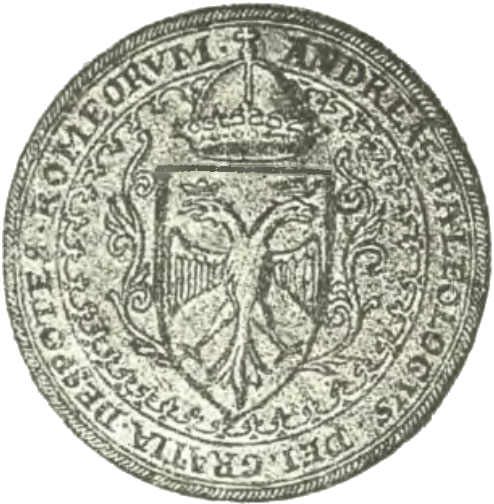
Seal of Andreas Palaiologos, son of Thomas, with the inscription "Andreas Palaiologos, by the grace of God, Despot of the Romans"

Mehmed II left the Morea in late summer, taking Demetrios and his family with him. Helena did not enter the Sultan's harem, and Demetrios received the proceeds of the islands of Imbros and Lemnos, as well as the Thracian town of Ainos, and parts of the islands of Thasos and Samothrace, as well as additional payments, so that he received a yearly income of 700,000 silver akçes, before an embezzlement scandal saw him disgraced and reduced to a much smaller pension. Increasingly ill and of advanced age, Demetrios retired to a monastery in Adrianople where he and his wife died in 1470, shortly after their daughter Helena. Thomas was lavishly received in Rome by the Pope, where he died in 1465. Thomas' elder son Andreas laid claim to the titles of 'Despot of the Morea' and later 'Emperor of Constantinople' and hoped to recover his father's possessions, but later sold his claims to King Charles VIII of France. He died in 1502, willing his claims to Ferdinand II of Aragon and Isabella I of Castile. His younger brother Manuel left Rome for Constantinople, where he spent the rest of his life under the Sultan's patronage.

== Sources ==
- Babinger, Franz (1978). Mehmed the Conqueror and His Time. Bollingen Series 96. Translated from the German by Ralph Manheim. Edited, with a preface, by William C. Hickman (1978 ed.). Princeton, New Jersey: Princeton University Press.
- Chasiotis, Ioannis (1974). "Πολεμικές συγκρούσεις στον ελληνικό χώρο και η συμμετοχή των Ελλήνων" [Conflicts in the Greek lands and the participation of the Greeks]. Ιστορία του Ελληνικού Έθνους, Τόμος Ι′: Ο ελληνισμός υπό ξένη κυριαρχία, 1453–1669 [History of the Greek Nation, Volume X: Hellenism under foreign rule, 1453–1669] (in Greek). Athens: Ekdotiki Athinon. pp. 252–323.
- Fine, John V. A. (1994) [1987]. The Late Medieval Balkans: A Critical Survey from the Late Twelfth Century to the Ottoman Conquest. Ann Arbor, Michigan: University of Michigan Press. ISBN 978-0-472-10079-8.
- Harris, Jonathan (2010). The End of Byzantium. New Haven: Yale University Press. ISBN 978-0300117868. JSTOR j.ctt1npm19.
- Inalcik, Halil (1989). "The Ottoman Turks and the Crusades, 1451–1522". In Setton, Kenneth M.; Hazard, Harry W.; Zacour, Norman P. (eds.). A History of the Crusades, Volume VI: The Impact of the Crusades on Europe. Vol. 6. Madison and London: University of Wisconsin Press. pp. 222–275. ISBN 0-299-10740-X.
- Setton, Kenneth M. (1976). The Papacy and the Levant (1204–1571), Volume I: The Thirteenth and Fourteenth Centuries. Vol. 1. Philadelphia: The American Philosophical Society. ISBN 0-87169-114-0.
- Setton, Kenneth M. (1978). The Papacy and the Levant (1204–1571), Volume II: The Fifteenth Century. Vol. 2. Philadelphia: The American Philosophical Society. ISBN 0-87169-127-2.
- Nicol, Donald M. (1993) [1972]. The Last Centuries of Byzantium, 1261–1453 (Second ed.). Cambridge: Cambridge University Press. ISBN 978-0-521-43991-6.
- Runciman, Steven (2009) [1980]. Lost Capital of Byzantium: The History of Mistra and the Peloponnese. Tauris Parke Paperbacks. ISBN 978-1-84511-895-2.
- Talbot, Alice-Mary (1991). "Morea, Despotate of". In Kazhdan, Alexander (ed.). The Oxford Dictionary of Byzantium. Oxford and New York: Oxford University Press. pp. 1409–1410. ISBN 0-19-504652-8.
- Topping, Peter (1975). "The Morea, 1364–1460". In Setton, Kenneth M.; Hazard, Harry W. (eds.). A History of the Crusades, Volume III: The Fourteenth and Fifteenth Centuries. Vol. 3. Madison and London: University of Wisconsin Press. pp. 141–166. ISBN 0-299-06670-3.
- Vakalopoulos, Apostolos E. (1974). Ιστορία του νέου ελληνισμού, Τόμος Α′: Αρχές και διαμόρφωσή του (Έκδοση Β′) [History of modern Hellenism, Volume I: Its origins and formation] (in Greek) (2nd ed.). Thessaloniki: Emm. Sfakianakis & Sons.
