= Demetrios Palaiologos =

Brother of the last Byzantine emperor (1407–1470)

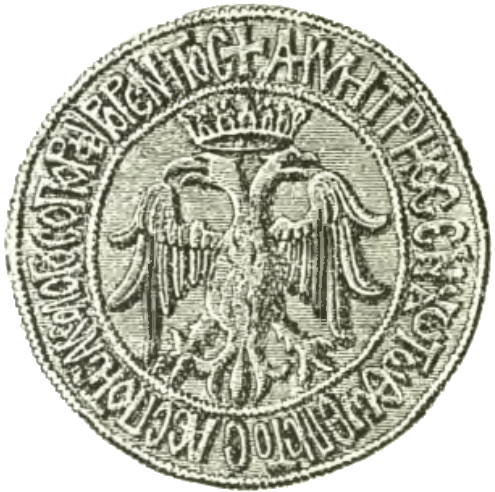
- Seal of Demetrios with the inscription "Demetrios, in Christ the God Faithful Despot, Palaiologos the Porphyrogennetos"

Despot of the Morea
- Reign: March 1449 – 29 May 1460
- Predecessor: Constantine and Thomas Palaiologos
- Co-ruler: Thomas Palaiologos

Despot of Lemnos
- Reign: 1422–1440

Despot of Mesembria
- Reign: 1441–1442
- Born: 1407; Constantinople, Byzantine Empire (now Istanbul, Turkey)
- Died: 1470 (aged c. 63); Adrianople, Ottoman Empire (now Edirne, Turkey)
- Spouse: 1. A daughter of Kantakouzenos Strabomytes; 2. Zoe Paraspondyle; 3. Theodora Asanina
- Issue: Helena Palaiologina
- Dynasty: Palaiologos
- Father: Manuel II Palaiologos
- Mother: Helena Dragaš
- Religion: Greek Orthodox
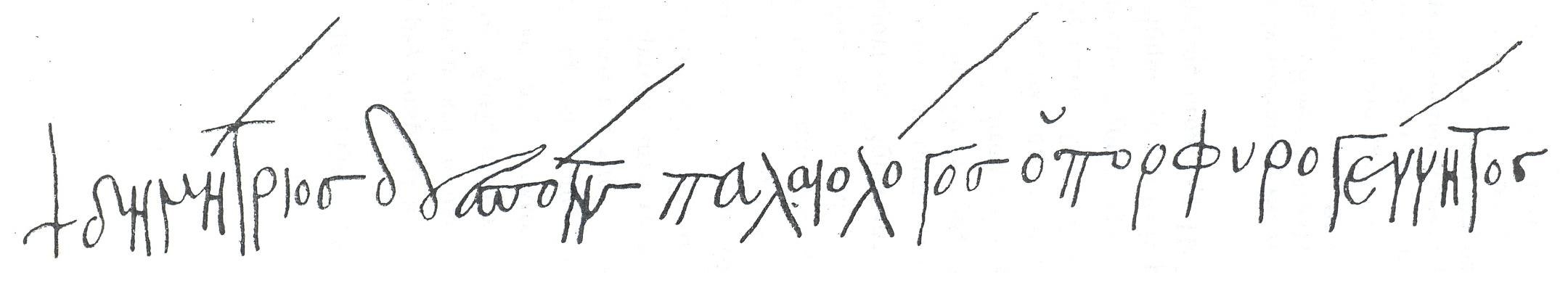
- Signature

Demetrios Palaiologos or Demetrius Palaeologus (Greek: Δημήτριος Παλαιολόγος, romanized: Dēmētrios Palaiologos; 1407–1470) was Despot of the Morea together with his brother Thomas from 1449 until the fall of the despotate in 1460. Demetrios and Thomas were sons of Byzantine Emperor Manuel II Palaiologos, and brothers of the final two emperors John VIII and Constantine XI. Demetrios had a complicated relationship with his brothers, whom he frequently quarrelled with, usually over the matter of Demetrios's wish to establish himself as the most senior of them and claim the imperial throne for himself.

In 1437, Demetrios accompanied his elder brother John VIII to the Council of Florence, the main objective of which was to unify the Roman Catholic and Eastern Orthodox churches so that Western Europe might be more inclined to lend military aid to the desperate Byzantine Empire. Even though Demetrios was staunchly against a union of the churches, he was brought along as John did not dare to leave him in the east without he himself being present. Demetrios attempted to claim the throne twice, first attempting to take it with Ottoman support in 1442 and then by hoping to be proclaimed emperor after John VIII's death in 1448. Both attempts failed and in 1449, Demetrios was proclaimed as Despot of the Morea by the new emperor, his brother Constantine XI.

John VIII had already made Thomas, Demetrios's younger brother, Despot of the Morea, and Constantine now desired for them to rule jointly. The two despots found it difficult to cooperate and often quarrelled with each other. In the aftermath of the Fall of Constantinople, the death of Constantine XI and end of the Byzantine Empire on 29 May 1453, Ottoman Sultan Mehmed II allowed Thomas and Demetrios to continue to rule as Ottoman vassals in the Morea. Though he never proclaimed himself emperor, some of the Moreots wished to proclaim Demetrios, the oldest living brother of Constantine XI, as Constantine's successor. Thomas hoped to turn the small despotate into a rallying point of a campaign to restore the empire, hoping to gain support from the Papacy and Western Europe. The constant disagreements between Thomas and Demetrios, who supported the Ottomans instead, eventually led Mehmed to invade and conquer the Morea in 1460.

Though Thomas escaped into exile, Demetrios was captured at the despotate's capital, Mystras, and surrendered to the Ottomans on 29 May 1460, exactly seven years after Constantinople's fall. As compensation for the loss of the Morea, Mehmed granted Demetrios lands in Thrace and some islands, which allowed Demetrios to live in relative comfort until he was stripped of his lands and income in 1467 following accusations against his brother-in-law. Shortly after, the sultan granted him an estate in Adrianople, where he lived with his wife, Theodora Asanina. After the death of his daughter and only child, Helena, in 1469 at Edirne, Demetrios retired and became a monk, dying a year later in 1470.

== Biography ==
=== Early life ===
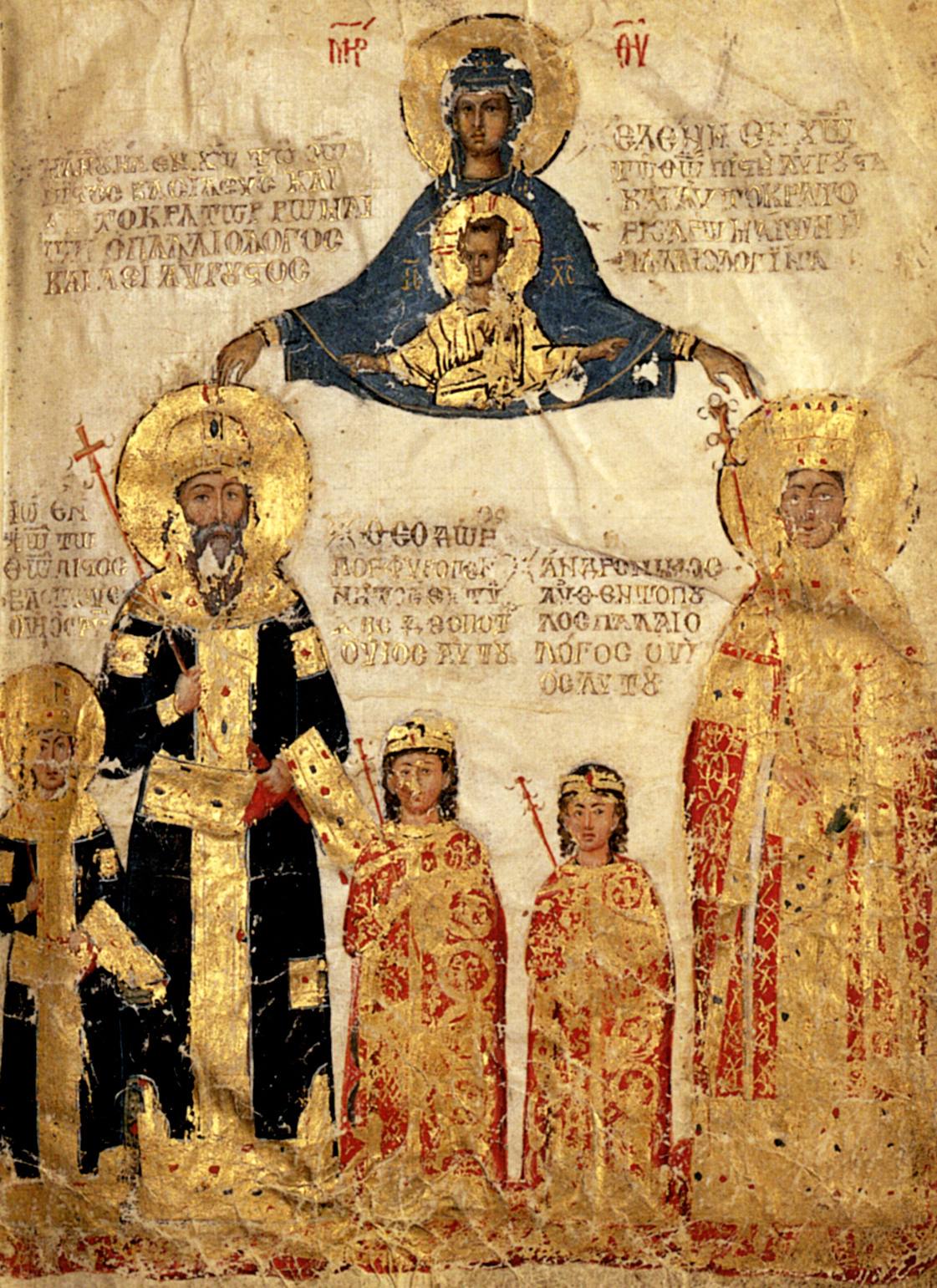
Miniature from an early 15th-century manuscript depicting Demetrios's father Emperor Manuel II Palaiologos, his mother Helena Dragaš and his three oldest brothers John (later Emperor John VIII), Theodore and Andronikos

As the Byzantine Empire fell apart and fragmented over the course of the 14th century, the emperors of the Palaiologan dynasty came to feel that the only sure way to keep their remaining holdings intact was to grant them to their sons, receiving the title of despot, as appanages to defend and govern. Emperor Manuel II Palaiologos (r. 1391–1425) had a total of six sons who survived infancy. Manuel's eldest surviving son, John, was raised to co-emperor and designated to succeed Manuel as sole emperor upon his death. The second son, Theodore was designated as Despot of the Morea and the third, Andronikos, was made Despot of Thessaloniki in 1408 at just eight years old. Manuel's younger sons, Constantine, Demetrios (born in 1407), and Thomas, were kept in Constantinople as there was insufficient land left to grant them. The younger children; Theodore, Andronikos, Constantine, Demetrios and Thomas were frequently described as having the distinction of Porphyrogennetos ("born in the purple"; born in the imperial palace during the reign of their father), a distinction that does not appear to have been shared by the emperor-to-be John.

Relations between the Palaiologos brothers were not always good. Though the young John and Constantine appear to have got on well with each other, relations between Constantine and the younger Demetrios and Thomas were not as friendly. Demetrios was made the despot of the island of Lemnos in 1422 by Manuel; however, he was not satisfied and refused to live on the island. In 1423, Demetrios fled to the court of King Sigismund of Hungary in 1423 under the pretext of needing protection against his brothers. He was accompanied by two of his supporters, Hilario Doria and George Izaoul, and did not return to Constantinople until 1427.

In 1437, John, now Emperor John VIII, left Constantinople to attend the Council of Florence in an effort to unite the Orthodox and Catholic churches and thus inspire Western Europe to act in the defense of his collapsing empire, threatened by the rapidly expanding Ottoman Empire. John left Constantine, his most trusted brother, and favored heir, as regent in Constantinople. Demetrios, alongside many distinguished Byzantine nobles and church officials (including the Patriarch of Constantinople, Joseph II) accompanied John on his journey to Italy. Although Demetrios was known to be firmly against any plans of reuniting the Orthodox and Catholic churches, he had already shown rebellious tendencies, hoping to become emperor himself with Ottoman support, and could not be trusted to remain in Constantinople or Lemnos when the emperor was away.

While the Council of Florence did achieve a union of the churches, it lasted for several years, concluding in June 1439. John did not return to Constantinople until 1 February 1440 and though he was received with a grand and ceremony, organized by Constantine and Demetrios (who had returned sometime earlier), the news that the churches had been unified stirred a wave of resentment and bitterness among the general populace, who felt that John had betrayed their faith.

=== Attempts to become emperor ===
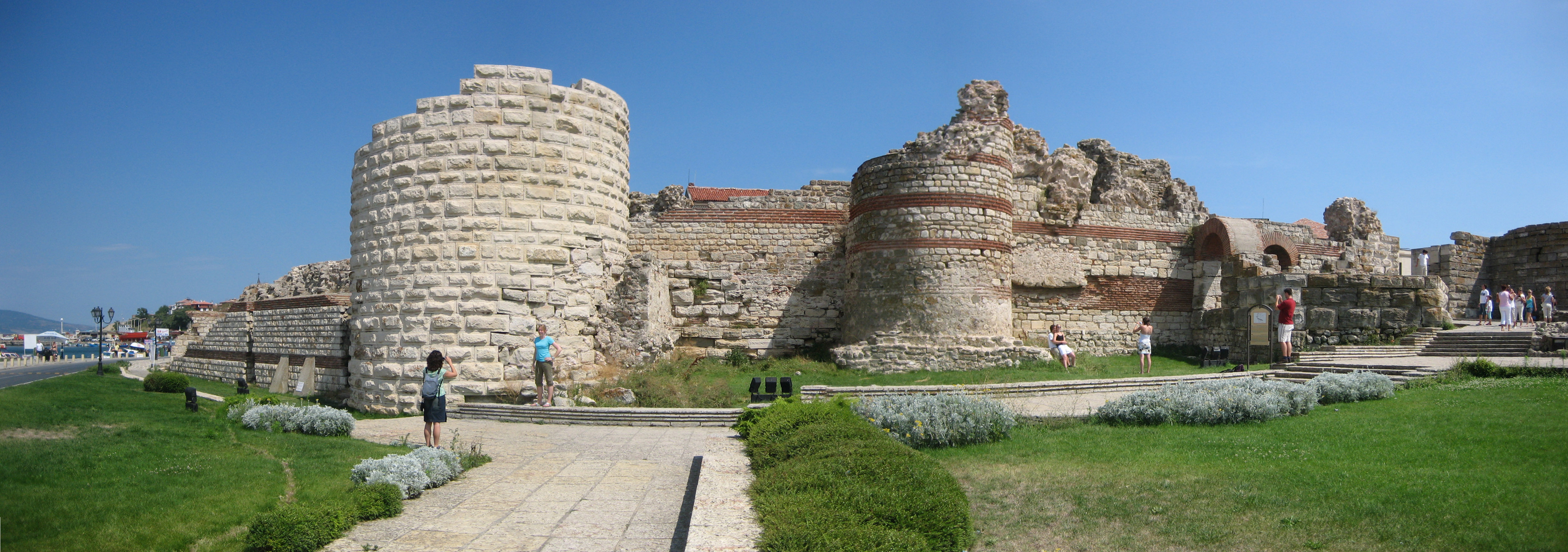
Ruins of fortifications in Mesembria, where Demetrios ruled as despot until his attempt to usurp the throne in 1442

With his tenure as regent finished, Constantine had observed that the other Despots of the Morea (Constantine's former appanage), his brothers Theodore and Thomas, had ruled well without him and he considered that he could serve the empire's interest better if he were closer to the capital. Demetrios now governed a stretch of land around the city of Mesembria in Thrace and Constantine considered the idea that he and Demetrios could switch places, Constantine becoming the new governor in Mesembria and Demetrios being granted the Morea. Constantine thus sent his close adviser George Sphrantzes to propose the idea to both Demetrios and Ottoman Sultan Murad II, who by this point had to be consulted about any appointments.

By 1442, Demetrios had no desire for new appointments, instead eyeing the imperial throne. He had just made a deal with Murad himself and had raised an army, portraying himself as the champion of the anti-unionist cause, which opposed the union of the Catholic and Eastern Orthodox Churches, a cause supported by the Turks, declaring war on his brother John VIII. When Sphrantzes reached Demetrios to deliver Constantine's offer, Demetrios was already preparing to march on Constantinople. The danger he posed to the city was so great that Constantine was summoned from the Morea by John VIII to oversee the city's defenses. In April 1442, Demetrios and the Ottomans began their attack, but they were repulsed and Demetrios was briefly imprisoned. In March 1443, Sphrantzes was made governor of Selymbria in Constantine's name. From Selymbria, Sphrantzes and Constantine would be able to keep a watchful eye on the activities of Demetrios. In November, Constantine gave over control of Selymbria to Theodore, who in turn abandoned his position as Despot of the Morea, making Constantine and Thomas the sole Despots of the Morea.

Theodore died in June 1448 and on 31 October of the same year, Emperor John VIII also passed away. The potential successors to the throne were Constantine, Demetrios and Thomas. John had not formally designated an heir, though everyone knew he favored Constantine and ultimately, the will of their mother, Helena Dragaš (who also preferred Constantine), prevailed. Both Thomas, who had no intention of claiming the throne, and Demetrios, who most certainly did, hurried to Constantinople and reached the capital before Constantine. Though Demetrios was favored by many due to his anti-unionist sentiment, Helena reserved her right to act as regent until her eldest son, Constantine arrived, stalling Demetrios's attempt at seizing the throne. Thomas accepted Constantine's appointment and Demetrios, who soon thereafter joined in proclaiming Constantine as his new emperor, was overruled. Soon thereafter, Sphrantzes informed Sultan Murad II, who also accepted the appointment.

=== Despot of the Morea ===
==== The Fall of Constantinople and early rule ====
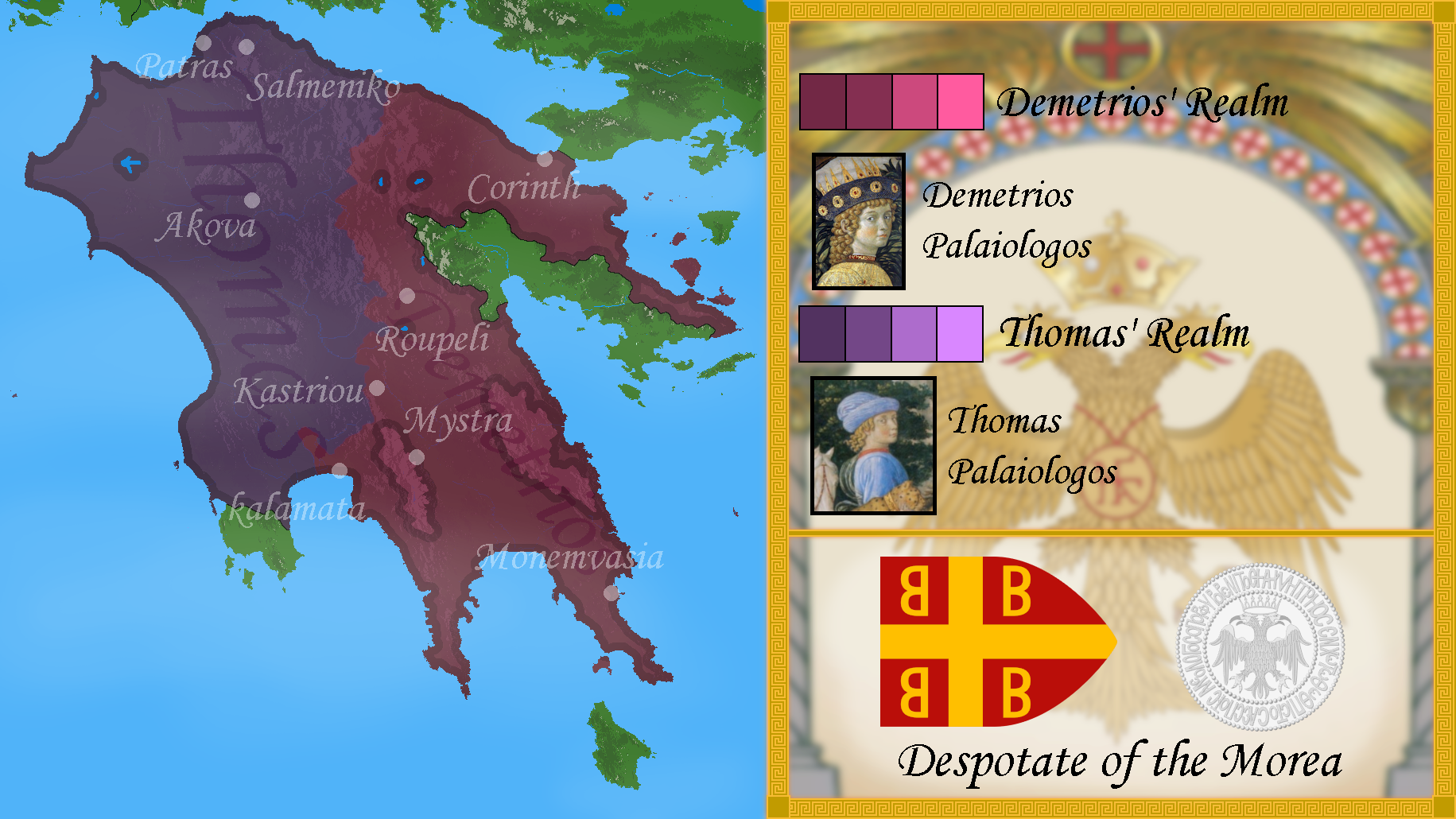
The Despotate of the Morea c. 1450, showing the areas under the control of Demetrios and his brother Thomas

In order to remove Demetrios from the capital and its vicinity, Constantine made Demetrios Despot of the Morea, to rule the despotate together with Thomas. Demetrios was granted the despotate's nominal capital, Mystras, and primarily ruled the southern and eastern parts of the despotate, with Thomas ruling Corinthia and the north-west, variously using Patras or Leontari as his capital. During his tenure as despot, Demetrios made some efforts to expand the despotate, seizing the Venetian-held castle of Kastri. With him to the Morea, Demetrios brought a part of the ancient Asen family, which had once ruled the Second Bulgarian Empire. Demetrios married Theodora Asanina, daughter of Paul Asan. Theodora's brother Matthew Palaiologos Asen was appointed as governor of Corinth by Demetrios.

Before his marriage to Theodora, Demetrios had been married either once or twice. His previous marriage(s) had not produced any children. His "first" wife was the daughter of Kantakouzenos Strabomytes, between 1430 and 1435. His "second" wife, possibly the same person as the daughter of Kantakouzenos Strabomytes, was Zoe Paraspondyle and died in March/April 1436.

In 1452, during the preparation stages of the final Ottoman siege of Constantinople, Constantine XI sent an urgent message to the Morea, requesting that one of his brothers bring their forces to help him defend the city. To prevent aid coming from the Morea, Mehmed II sent one of his generals, Turahan Bey (who had raided the Morea twice before) to devastate the peninsula. The Turkish attack was repelled by an army commanded by Matthew Palaiologos Asen, but this victory came too late to offer any aid to Constantinople, which fell on 29 May 1453.

In the aftermath of Constantinople's fall, and Constantine XI's death in its defense, one of the most pressing threats to the new Ottoman regime was the possibility that one of Constantine XI's surviving relatives would find a following and return to reclaim the empire. Luckily for Mehmed II, the two despots in the Morea represented scarcely more than a nuisance and were allowed to keep their titles and lands. When emissaries of Thomas and Demetrios visited the Sultan at Adrianople some months after Constantinople's fall, the Sultan demanded no surrender of territory, only that the despots were to pay an annual tribute of 10,000 ducats. Because the Morea was allowed to continue to exist, many Byzantine refugees fled to the despotate, which made it somewhat of a Byzantine government-in-exile. Some of these influential refugees and courtiers even raised the idea of proclaiming Demetrios, the elder brother, as the Emperor of the Romans and the legitimate successor of Constantine XI. Both Thomas and Demetrios might have considered making their small despotate the rallying point of a campaign to restore the empire, with considerable fertile and wealthy territory under the despotate's control, there did seem for a moment to be a possibility that the empire could live on in the Morea. However, Thomas and Demetrios were never able to cooperate and spent most of their resources fighting each other rather than preparing for a struggle against the Turks. Since Thomas had spent most of his life in the Morea, and Demetrios most of his life elsewhere, the two brothers hardly knew each other.

Shortly after Constantinople fell, a revolt broke out against the despots in the Morea, prompted by the many Albanian immigrants to the region being unhappy with the actions of the local Greek landowners. The Albanians had respected earlier despots, such as Constantine and Theodore, but despised the two current despots and without central authority from Constantinople, they saw their opportunity to gain control of the despotate for themselves. In Thomas's part of the despotate, the rebels chose to proclaim John Asen Zaccaria, bastard son of the last Prince of Achaea, as their leader and in Demetrios's part of the despotate, the leader of the revolt was Manuel Kantakouzenos, grandson of Demetrios I Kantakouzenos (who had served as despot until 1384) and great-great-grandson of Emperor John VI Kantakouzenos (r. 1347–1354). With no hope of defeating the Albanians on their own, the despots appealed to the only power near enough and strong enough to aid them; the Ottomans. Mehmed II did not wish to see the despotate pass into the hands of Albanians, and out of his control, and sent an army to quell the rebellion in December 1453. The rebellion was not fully crushed until October 1454, when Turahan Bey arrived to aid the despots in firmly establishing their authority in the region. In return for the aid, Mehmed demanded a heavier tribute from Thomas and Demetrios, amounting to 12,000 ducats annually rather than the previous 10,000.

==== The possibility of Western aid ====
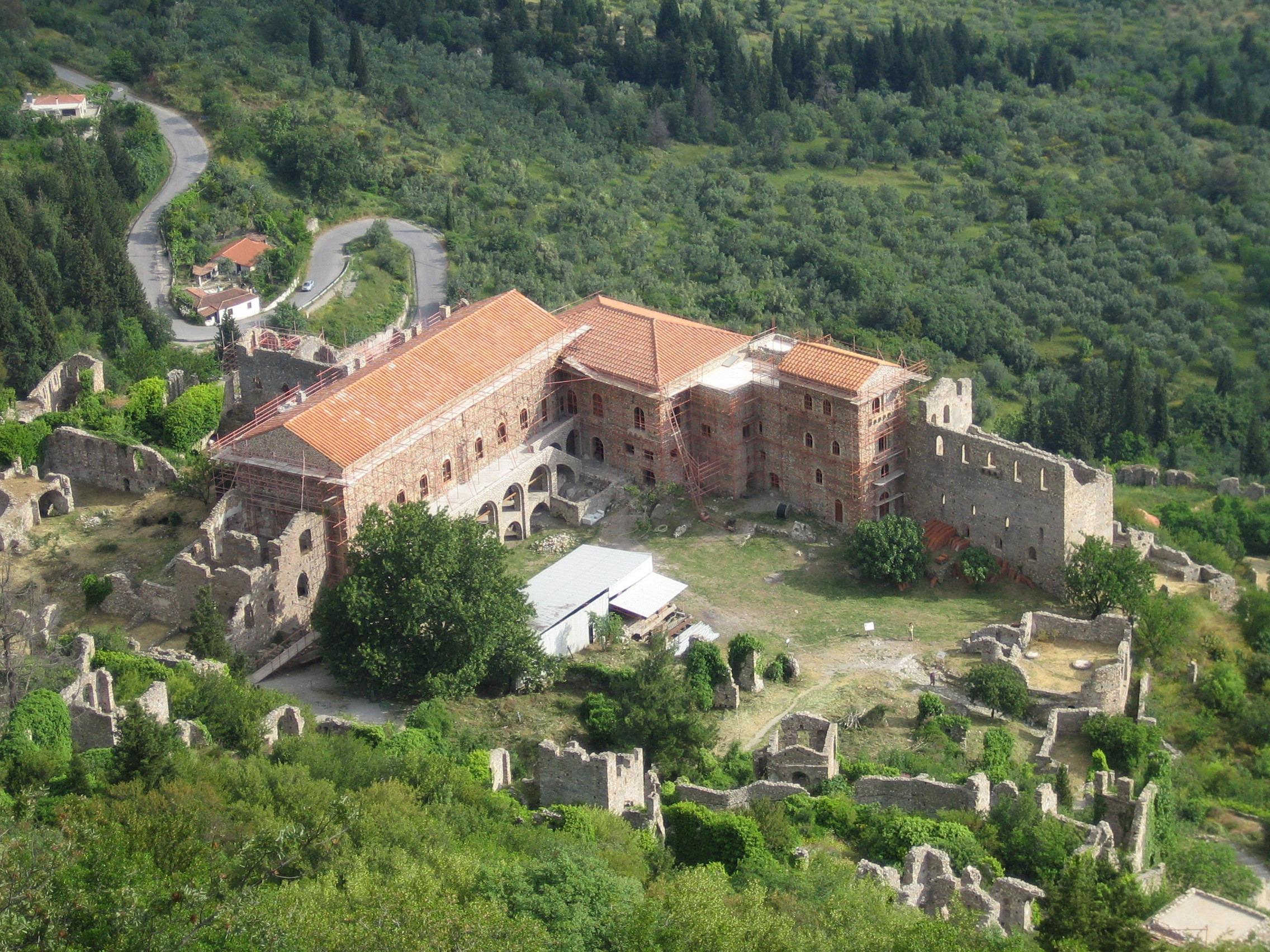
The Despot's Palace in Mystras, from which Demetrios ruled as Despot of the Morea

Neither brother could raise the sum demanded by the Sultan and they were divided in their policies. While Demetrios, probably the more realistic of the two, had more or less given up hope of Christian aid from the west and thought it might be best to placate the Turks, Thomas retained hope that the Papacy might yet call for a crusade to restore the Byzantine Empire. Thomas's hopes were not ridiculous; the Fall of Constantinople had been received with as much horror in Western Europe as it had been in the few remaining Byzantine territories in the East. In September 1453, Pope Nicholas V issued the crusading bull Etsi ecclesia Christi, which called on Christians throughout the west to take the cross and embark on a crusade to recover Constantinople. The response was enthusiastic; some of Europe's most powerful and influential rulers came forward to take the cross, including Philip the Good of Burgundy in February 1454 and Alfonso the Magnanimous of Aragon and Naples in November 1455. Alfonso promised to personally lead a host of 50,000 men and 400 ships against the Ottomans. At Frankfurt, Holy Roman Emperor Frederick III assembled a council of German princes and proposed that 40,000 men be sent to Hungary, where the Ottomans had suffered a crushing defeat at Belgrade in 1456. If the combined forces of Hungary, Aragon, Burgundy and the Holy Roman Empire had been unleashed to exploit the victory at Belgrade, Ottoman control of the Balkans would have been seriously threatened.

Despite the Ottomans having secured the position of the two despots in the recent Albanian uprising, the possibility of Western aid to restore Byzantine territory proved too enticing to resist. Thomas sent John Argyropoulos and other envoys to the West in 1456 and even Demetrios, decidedly anti-Latin, softened his attitude towards the West. Demetrios raised the possibility of a marriage alliance with Alfonso of Aragon and Naples, suggesting that his daughter Helena marry Alfonso's grandson. Despite his own views on the Council of Florence, Demetrios even sent his own envoy to Pope Nicholas V's successor, Pope Callixtus III, in 1455; Frankoulios Servopoulos, a known supporter of the Council of Florence. Servopoulos probably arrived in Rome at around the same time as Thomas's envoy, Argyropoulos, and the two envoys travelled through Europe, visiting the same courts, independently of each other. Thomas and Demetrios proved to be incapable of working together even with foreign diplomacy.

==== Moreot civil war and the fall of the Morea ====
In the end, no crusade ever set out to combat the Ottomans. Due to their conviction that help would arrive, and being unable to pay, the two despots had not paid their annual tribute to the Ottomans for three years. With no money coming from the Morea, and the looming threat of Western aid, Mehmed eventually lost his patience with the Palaiologoi. The Ottoman army marched from Adrianople in May 1458 and entered the Morea, where the only real resistance was faced at Corinth, within the domain governed by Demetrios. Leaving his artillery to bombard and besiege that city, Mehmed left with most of his army to devastate and conquer the northern parts of the despotate, under Thomas's jurisdiction. Corinth at last gave up in August, after several cities in the north had already surrendered, and Mehmed imposed a heavy retribution on the Morea. The territory under the two brothers was drastically reduced, Corinth, Patras and much of the north-west of the peninsula were annexed into the Ottoman Empire and provided with Turkish governors, with the Palaiologoi only being allowed to keep the south, including the despotate's nominal capital, Mystras, on the condition that they paid their annual tribute to the sultan.

Almost as soon as Mehmed had left the Morea, the two brothers began quarreling with each other again. Mehmed's victory had only increased the antagonism between Thomas and Demetrios. Demetrios had shifted to becoming even more pro-Ottoman after Mehmed had promised the despot that he would marry his daughter Helena, whereas Thomas increasingly hoped for western aid as the regions of the Morea annexed by Mehmed had been almost the entire area ruled by Thomas, including his capital of Patras. In January 1459, Thomas rebelled against Demetrios and the Ottomans, joining with a number of Albanian lords. They seized the fortress of Kalavryta and much of the land in the central Morea and besieged Kalamata and Mantineia, fortresses held by Demetrios. Demetrios responded by seizing Leontari and called for aid from the Turkish governors in the northern Morea. There were many attempts made to broker peace between the two brothers, such as Mehmed ordering the Bishop of Lacedaemon to make the two swear to keep the peace, but any truce lasted only briefly. Many of the Byzantine nobles in the Morea could only look on in horror as the civil war raged on. Byzantine historian George Sphrantzes summed up the conflict with the following words:

Both brothers fought against each other with all their resources. Lord Demetrios rested his hopes on the friendship and help of the sultan, and on his claim that his subjects and castles had been wronged, while Lord Thomas relied on the fact that his opponent had committed perjury and that he was waging war against the impious.

Although Demetrios had more soldiers and resources, Thomas and the Albanians were able to appeal to the West for aid. After a successful skirmish against the Ottomans, Thomas sent 16 captured Turkish soldiers, alongside some of his armed guards, to Rome to convince the Pope that he was engaging in a holy war against the Muslims. The scheme worked and the Pope sent 300 Italian soldiers under the Milanese condottieri Gianone da Cremona to aid Thomas. With these reinforcements, Thomas gained the upper hand and it looked as if Demetrios was about to be defeated, having retreated to the town of Monemvasia and having sent Matthew Palaiologos Asen to Adrianople to beg Mehmed for aid. Thomas's pleas to the west represented a real threat to the Ottomans, a threat made even greater through the support of the plan by the vocal Cardinal Bessarion, a Byzantine refugee who had escaped the empire years earlier. Pope Pius II convened a council in 1459 in Mantua and sent Bessarion and some others to preach for a crusade against the Ottomans throughout Europe.

Determined to bring order to Greece, Mehmed decided that the destruction of the despotate and its full annexation directly into his empire was the only possible solution. The sultan assembled his army once more in April 1460 and led it in person first to Corinth and then on to Mystras. Although Demetrios had ostensibly been on the sultan's side, Mehmed invaded Demetrios's territory first. Demetrios surrendered to the Ottomans without a fight, fearing retribution and already having sent his family to safety in Monemvasia. Mystras thus fell into Ottoman hands on 29 May 1460, exactly seven years after Constantinople's fall. The few places in the Morea that dared resist the sultan's army were devastated as per Islamic law, the men being massacred and the women and children being taken away. As large numbers of Greek refugees escaped to Venetian-held territories such as Methoni and Koroni, the Morea was slowly subdued, the last resistance being led by Constantine Graitzas Palaiologos, a relative of Thomas and Demetrios, at Salmenikon in July 1461.

=== Life in the Ottoman Empire ===
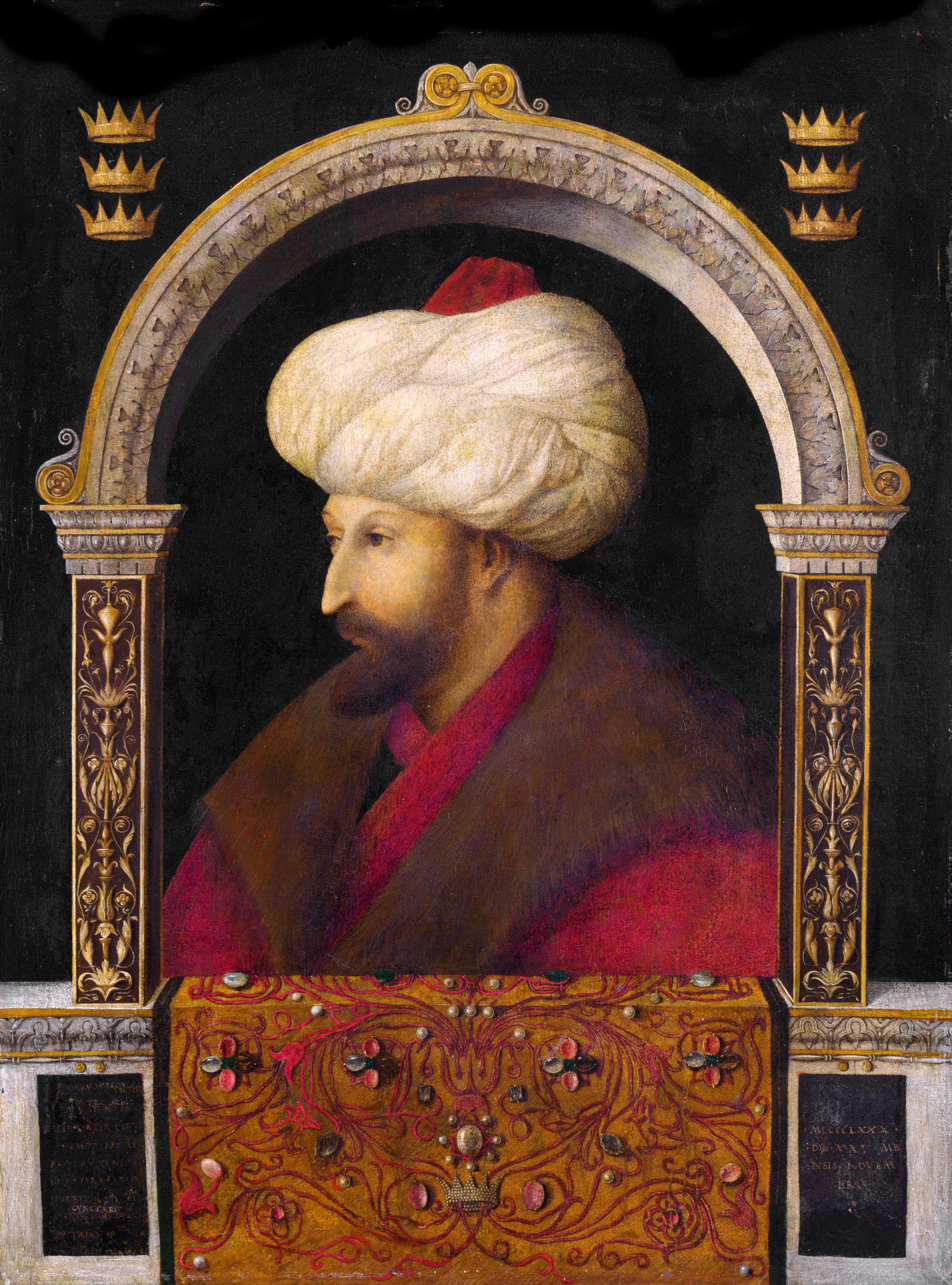
Portrait of Mehmed the Conqueror

On 31 May 1460, Mehmed II arrived outside Mystras in person, inviting the recently deposed despot to his tent. Demetrios was terrified of the sultan, but Mehmed received him kindly, offering him a chair and speaking gently to him. Mehmed demanded that Demetrios recall his wife Theodora and his only child, Helena, from their refuge in Monemvasia and yield them to the sultan so that they could accompany him to Adrianople, but also showered Demetrios with gifts and promised to grant him an appanage in Thrace as compensation for the loss of the Morea. Theodora and Helena were put in the care of some of the eunuchs in Mehmed's entourage and Demetrios was obliged to accompany Mehmed as he went on to subdue the rest of the Morea after spending four days at Mystras.

For the rest of his life, Demetrios, though favored, would in effect remain a prisoner of the Ottomans. Demetrios's appanage consisted of the islands Lemnos and Imbros, as well as parts of the islands Thassos and Samothrace as well as the town Enos in Thrace. Ownership of these lands brought Demetrios enough revenue to support himself and he lived in relative comfort, donating much of his income to the church. He lived at Enos for seven years, together with his wife Theodora and her brother, Matthew Palaiologos Asen. In 1467, George Sphrantzes, former companion to Constantine XI, who had little regard for either Matthew or Demetrios, wrote that Matthew, who controlled a local salt monopoly, had allowed his underlings to cheat the government on some revenue. Outraged by this, Mehmed II stripped Demetrios of his territories and income.

Demetrios, Theodora and Matthew were sent in disgrace to Didymoteicho, where Matthew died shortly thereafter. Mehmed appears to have taken pity on the former despot and then provided him and his wife with a small estate in Adrianople, where their daughter Helena was living at the time. Since the sultan feared that Helena, described as high-spirited, might attempt to poison him, he had never taken her into his harem. Helena had her own large estate and pension provided by Mehmed, but was forbidden to marry. After Helena died of unknown causes c. 1469, Demetrios and Theodora were so struck by grief that they retired to monastic life, Demetrios becoming a monk. The former despot died in 1470 and, due to Helena's death, left no descendants. Theodora also died in 1470, only outliving her husband by a few weeks.

== In popular culture ==
Portrayed by Volkan Keskin in the Turkish television series Mehmed: Fetihler Sultanı (2024).

Demetrios Palaiologos Palaiologos dynasty Born: 1407 Died: 1470
Regnal titles
Preceded by Thomas Palaiologos & Constantine Palaiologos	Despot of the Morea; 1449–1460 with Thomas Palaiologos	Ottoman conquest of the Morea
