= Helena Palaiologina (disambiguation) =

Helena Palaiologina was Queen consort of Cyprus (1428–1458); daughter of Theodore II Palaiologos.

Helena Palaiologina may also refer to:

- Helena Palaiologina of the Morea (1431–1473), Princess consort of Lazar Brankovic of Serbia; daughter of Thomas Palaiologos
- Helena Palaiologina (1442–1470), daughter of Demetrios Palaiologos, later taken into Sultan Mehmed II's harem
- Helena Dragaš (c.1372–1450), empress consort of Byzantine emperor Manuel II Palaiologos, venerated as a saint in the Greek Orthodox Church
