= Manuel Kantakouzenos (usurper) =

Byzantine usurper

- Despot of Morea

Despot of Morea
- Reign: 1453-1454
- Spouse: Cuchia
- Dynasty: Kantakouzenos
- Religion: Eastern Orthodoxy

Manuel Kantakouzenos (Greek: Μανουὴλ Καντακουζηνὸς) was a Greek rebel leader who started a revolt against the Palaiologos family in the Byzantine Despotate of the Morea.

== Life ==
He was the grandson of Demetrios I Kantakouzenos, the last Kantakouzenos governor of the Morea. Shortly after the fall of Constantinople and the death of the last Byzantine Emperor, Constantine XI, Manuel with the local Greek population joined 30,000 Albanians in a revolt against the two brothers, Thomas and Demetrios, rulers of the Byzantine Morea.

It was public knowledge that the two brothers hated one another, and using this situation to his advantage, Manuel headed this revolt in 1453. He was soon proclaimed by the Albanians as a Despot and in order to please them, he took the Albanian name "Gjin" and also called his wife "Cuchia".

His situation was favorable in the beginning, but that quickly changed. The Palaiologos brothers soon realized that they needed outside help to succeed and appealed to the Ottomans and Venice to receive it. The Ottoman overlord of the Morea decided that the province would stay in the hands of Thomas and Demetrios and assisted the two brothers. With minimal Ottoman support, the brothers joined together and crushed the revolt the following year, in 1454.

== Sources ==
- Miller, William (1908). The Latins in the Levant: A History of Frankish Greece (1204–1566). London: John Murray.
