= Helena Palaiologina (daughter of Demetrios) =

Byzantine princess, daughter of Demetrios Palaiologos

- Born: 23 April 1442; Mesembria (now Nesebar, Bulgaria)
- Died: c. 1469 (aged c. 27); Adrianople (now Edirne, Turkey)
- Buried: Edirne
- Noble family: Palaiologos
- Spouse: Mehmed II
- Father: Demetrios Palaiologos
- Mother: Theodora Asanina

Helena Palaiologina (Greek: Ἑλένη Παλαιολογίνα; 23 April 1442 – c. 1469), known also as Helena Hatun, was the daughter and only child of Demetrios Palaiologos, Despot of Morea, a brother of the final Byzantine emperor Constantine XI Palaiologos. Her mother was Theodora Asanina of the Asen family, a family which had once ruled Bulgaria.

== Biography ==
Helena Palaiologina, born 23 April 1442, was the daughter and only child of Demetrios Palaiologos, Despot of the Morea, a brother of Constantine XI Palaiologos, the final Byzantine emperor. Her mother was Theodora Asanina, the daughter of Paul Asan, part of the ancient Asen family, which had once ruled the Second Bulgarian Empire. At the time of Helena's birth, Demetrios was the Despot of Mesembria, not being appointed as the Despot of the Morea until 1449. In her time, Helena was famous for being beautiful and high-spirited.

In 1455, two years after the Fall of Constantinople, Helena's father Demetrios attempted to arrange a marriage alliance with Aragon and Naples by betrothing Helena, then 13 years old, to a grandson of King Alfonso the Magnanimous. After Sultan Mehmed II, who had conquered Constantinople in 1453 and now ruled as the suzerain of Demetrios and his co-despot and younger brother Thomas, invaded the Morea in 1458 because he had not received the agreed upon tribute by the two despots, these marriage plans fell through. Instead, Mehmed proclaimed that he would marry Helena.

From 1459 to 1460, Demetrios and Thomas fought a civil war over control of the Morea, which ended only with the intervention of Mehmed II and the annexation of both their territories into the Ottoman Empire. Whereas Thomas escaped into exile, Demetrios surrendered to the Ottomans at Mystras without a fight. Since he feared the sultan's retribution, Helena and her mother Theodore had already been sent to safety in Monemvasia. On 31 May, Mehmed II arrived outside Mystras and met with the frightened Demetrios, demanding Demetrios to recall Theodora and Helena from Monemvasia and yield them to the sultan so that they could accompany him to Adrianople. The sultan probably, at least initially, intended for Helena, now 18 years old, to enter his harem, and put her and her mother in the care of some of the eunuchs in his entourage. As per Byzantine historian Theodore Spandounes, Mehmed never married Helena:

The Despot Demetrios who ruled at Mistra seems to have allowed the Sultan to conquer the Peloponnese because Mehmed had promised to take his daughter to wife. She was his only child and heiress to all that he had. Mehmed, however, no longer wanted to marry Demetrios's daughter; and she died as a virgin at Adrianople.

According to Joseph von Hammer-Purgstall, Mehmed II “did not deem Helena Palaiologina worthy of residing in the imperial harem, but assigned a eunuch to attend her.” William Miller, relying on Greek sources, states that Mehmed did not trust Helena and feared that she might poison him.In addition, Ottoman sources contain no record of a marriage between Mehmed II and Helena Palaiologina.

She died of unknown causes around 1469, only about 27 years old, and both of her parents, so struck by grief that they retired to monastic life, died in the following year.
