= Thomas Palaiologos =

Despot of the Morea from 1428 to 1460

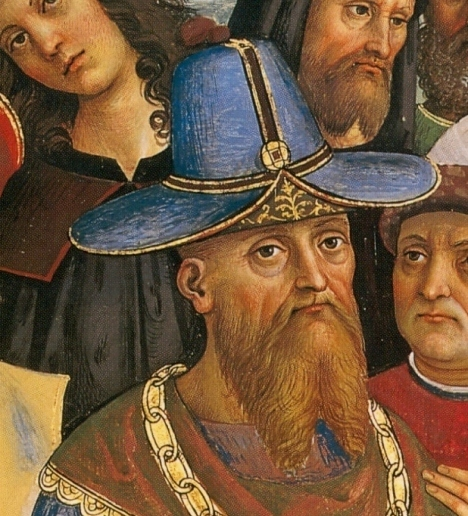
- Thomas, detail from the Pintoricchio fresco of Pius II's arrival at Ancona, in the Siena Cathedral

Despot of the Morea
- Reign: 1428–1460 (claimed in exile until 12 May 1465)
- Predecessor: Theodore II Palaiologos (alone)
- Successor: Andreas Palaiologos (titular)
- Co-rulers: Theodore II Palaiologos (1428–1443); Constantine Palaiologos (1428–1449); Demetrios Palaiologos (1449–1460)
- Born: 1409; Constantinople
- Died: 12 May 1465 (aged 56); Rome
- Burial: St. Peter's Basilica, Rome
- Spouse: Catherine Zaccaria
- Issue: Helena Palaiologina; Zoe Palaiologina; Andreas Palaiologos; Manuel Palaiologos
- Dynasty: Palaiologos
- Father: Manuel II Palaiologos
- Mother: Helena Dragaš
- Religion: Eastern Catholicism
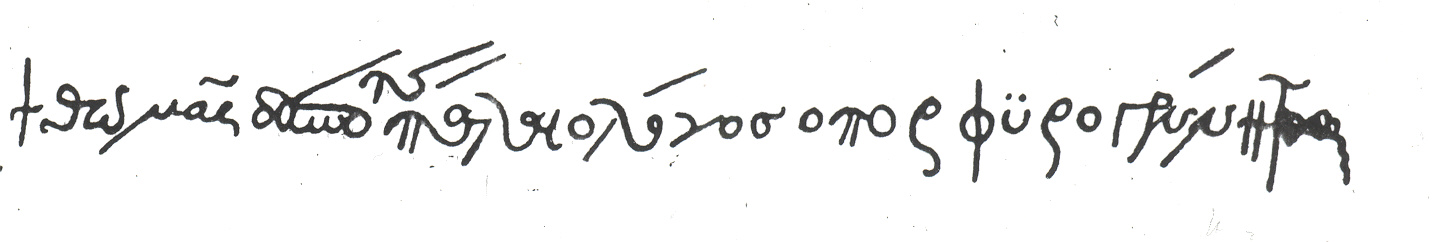
- Signature

Thomas Palaiologos (Greek: Θωμᾶς Παλαιολόγος; 1409 – 12 May 1465) was Despot of the Morea from 1428 until the fall of the despotate in 1460, although he continued to claim the title until his death five years later. He was the younger brother of Constantine XI Palaiologos, the final Byzantine emperor. Thomas was appointed as Despot of the Morea by his oldest brother, Emperor John VIII Palaiologos, in 1428, joining his two brothers and other despots Theodore and Constantine, already governing the Morea. Though Theodore proved reluctant to cooperate with his brothers, Thomas and Constantine successfully worked to strengthen the despotate and expand its borders. In 1432, Thomas brought the remaining territories of the Latin Principality of Achaea, established during the Fourth Crusade more than two hundred years earlier, into Byzantine hands by marrying Catherine Zaccaria, heiress to the principality.

In 1449, Thomas supported the ascension of his brother Constantine, who then became Emperor Constantine XI, to the throne despite the machinations of his other brother, Demetrios, who himself desired the throne. After Constantine's rise to the throne, Demetrios was then assigned by Constantine to govern the Morea with Thomas but the two brothers found it difficult to cooperate, often quarreling with each other. In the aftermath of the Fall of Constantinople and end of the Byzantine Empire in 1453, Ottoman Sultan Mehmed II allowed Thomas and Demetrios to continue to rule as Ottoman vassals in the Morea. Thomas hoped to turn the small despotate into a rallying point of a campaign to restore the empire, hoping to gain support from the Papacy and Western Europe. Constant quarreling with Demetrios, who supported the Ottomans instead, eventually led Mehmed to invade and conquer the Morea in 1460.

Thomas and his family, including his wife Catherine and his three younger children Zoe, Andreas and Manuel, escaped into exile to the Venetian-held city of Methoni and then to Corfu, where Catherine and the children stayed. In the hopes of raising support for a crusade to restore his lands in the Morea, and possibly the Byzantine Empire itself, Thomas travelled to Rome, where he was received and provided for by Pope Pius II. His hopes of retaking the Morea never materialized and he died in Rome on 12 May 1465. After his death, his claims were inherited by his oldest son Andreas, who also attempted to rally support for a campaign to restore the fallen despotate and the Byzantine Empire.

== Biography ==
=== Early life and appointment as despot ===
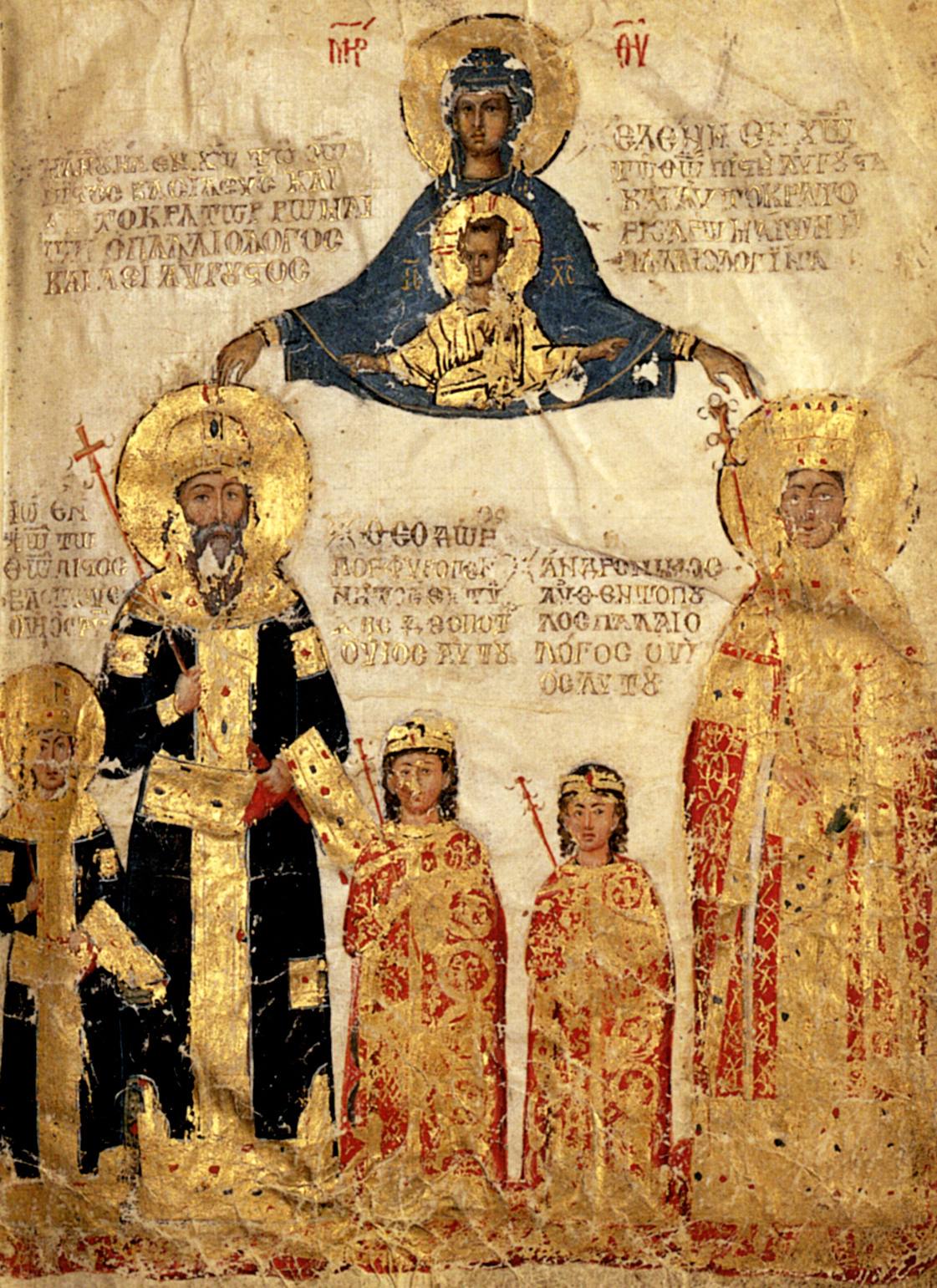
Miniature from an early 15th-century manuscript depicting Thomas's father Emperor Manuel II Palaiologos, his mother Helena Dragaš and his three oldest brothers John (later Emperor John VIII), Theodore and Andronikos

As the Byzantine Empire fell apart and fragmented over the course of the 14th century, the emperors of the Palaiologan dynasty came to feel that the only sure way to keep their remaining holdings intact was to grant them to their sons, receiving the title of despot, as appanages to defend and govern. Emperor Manuel II Palaiologos (r. 1391–1425) had a total of six sons who survived infancy. Manuel's eldest surviving son, John, was raised to co-emperor and designated to succeed Manuel as sole emperor upon his death. The second eldest son, Theodore was designated as Despot of the Morea and the third eldest, Andronikos, was made Despot of Thessaloniki in 1408 at just eight years old. Manuel's younger sons, Constantine, Demetrios, and Thomas (the youngest, born in 1409), were kept in Constantinople as there was not sufficient land left to grant them. The younger children; Theodore, Andronikos, Constantine, Demetrios and Thomas were frequently described as having the distinction of Porphyrogennetos ("born in the purple"; born in the imperial palace during the reign of their father), a distinction that does not appear to have been shared by the emperor-to-be John.

Relations between the Palaiologos brothers were not always good. Though the young John and Constantine appears to have got on well with each other, relations between Constantine and the younger Demetrios and Thomas were not as friendly. The complex relationships between the sons of Manuel II were put to the test when John, now Emperor John VIII, appointed Constantine as Despot of the Morea in 1428. Since his brother Theodore refused to step down from his role as despot, the despotate became governed by two members of the imperial family for the first time since its creation in 1349. Soon thereafter, the younger Thomas (aged 19) was also appointed as Despot of the Morea, meaning that the nominally undivided despotate had effectively disintegrated into three smaller principalities.

Theodore did not make way for Constantine or Thomas in the despotate's capital, Mystras. Instead, Theodore granted Constantine lands throughout the Morea, including the northern harbor town of Aigio, fortresses and towns in Laconia (in the south), and Kalamata and Messenia in the west. Constantine made his capital as despot the town Glarentza. Meanwhile, Thomas was given lands in the north and based himself in the castle of Kalavryta.

=== Despot under the Byzantine Empire ===
==== Strengthening the Morea ====
Map of the Byzantine Empire in 1400. By the time Thomas became Despot of the Morea in 1428, his older brother Theodore had already worked to expand the despotate's (the southern territory on the map) borders somewhat. It would be expanded to cover almost the entire Peloponnese by Thomas and his brother Constantine.

Shortly after being appointed as despots, Constantine and Thomas, together with Theodore, decided to join forces in an attempt to seize the flourishing and strategic port of Patras in the north-west of the Morea, then under the rule of its Catholic Archbishop. The campaign, which was unsuccessful, possibly due to Theodore's reluctance to partake, was Thomas's first experience of war. Constantine later captured Patras on his own, ending 225 years of foreign ownership.

Thomas's early tenure as Despot of the Morea was not without acquisitions either. For years, Thomas and Constantine had been eating away at the last remnants of the Principality of Achaea, a crusader state established during the Fourth Crusade in 1204 which had once governed almost the entire peninsula. It was Thomas who finally brought an end to the principality by marrying Catherine Zaccaria, daughter and heir of the final prince, Centurione II Zaccaria. With Centurione's death in 1432, Thomas could claim control over all of his remaining territories. By the 1430s, Thomas and Constantine had ensured that nearly the entire Peloponnese was once more in Byzantine hands for the first time since 1204, the only exception being the few port towns and cities held by the Republic of Venice.

Murad II, Sultan of the Ottoman Empire, which occupied most of the Byzantine Empire's former territory and had relegated the empire and the despotate as effectively vassal states, felt uneasy about the recent string of Byzantine successes in the Morea. In 1431, Turahan Bey, a Turkish general who governed Thessaly, sent his troops south to demolish the Morea's primary defensive fortifications, the Hexamilion wall, in an effort to remind the despots that they were the Sultan's vassals.

In March 1432, Constantine, possibly desiring to be closer to Mystras, made a new territorial agreement, presumably approved by Theodore and John VIII, with Thomas. Thomas agreed to cede his fortress Kalavryta to Constantine, who made it his new capital, in exchange for Elis, which Thomas made his new capital. Though relations between the three despots thus appears to have been good in 1432, they soon soured. John VIII had no sons to succeed him and it was thus assumed that his successor would be one of his four surviving brothers (Andronikos having died some time before). John VIII's preferred successor was Constantine and though this choice was accepted by Thomas, who had developed good relations with his older brother, it was resented by the still older Theodore. When Constantine was summoned to the capital in 1435, Theodore believed this was to appoint Constantine as co-emperor and designated heir, which was not actually the case, and he too travelled to Constantinople to raise his objections. The quarrel between Constantine and Theodore was not resolved until the end of 1436, when the future Patriarch Gregory Mammas was sent to reconcile them and prevent civil war. When Constantine was summoned to act as regent in Constantinople while John VIII was away at the Council of Florence from 1437 to 1440, Theodore and Thomas stayed in the Morea. In November 1443, Constantine gave over control of Selymbria, which he had received after helping to deal with the rebellion of their younger brother Demetrios, to Theodore, who in turn abandoned his position as Despot of the Morea, making Constantine and Thomas the sole Despots of the Morea. Though this brought Theodore closer to Constantinople, it also made Constantine the ruler of the capital of the Morea and one of the most powerful men in the small empire. With Theodore and Demetrios out of their way, Constantine and Thomas hoped to strengthen the Morea, by now the cultural center of the Byzantine world, and make it a safe and nearly self-sufficient principality. The philosopher Gemistus Pletho advocated that while Constantinople was the New Rome, Mystras and the Morea could become the "New Sparta", a centralized and strong Hellenic kingdom in its own right.

==== Turkish attacks and the accession of Constantine XI ====
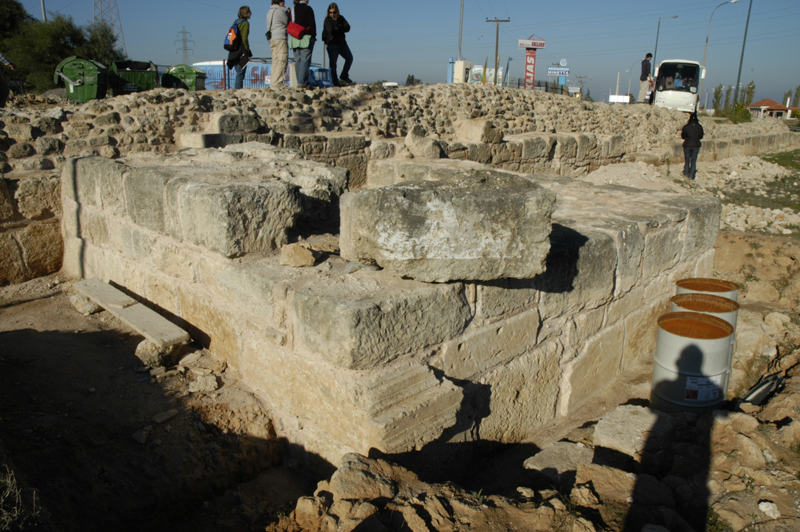
Ruins of the Hexamilion wall, restored by Thomas and his brother Constantine to defend the Morea in 1444 and destroyed by the Ottomans in 1446

Among the actions taken during the brothers' project of strengthening the despotate was to reconstruct the Hexamilion wall, destroyed by the Turks in 1431. Together, they completely restored the wall, which was finished in March 1444. The wall was destroyed by the Turks again in 1446 after Constantine had attempted to expand his control northwards and had refused the sultan's demands of dismantling the wall. Constantine and Thomas were determined to hold the wall and had brought all their available forces, amounting to perhaps as many as twenty thousand men, to defend it. Despite this, the battle by the wall in 1446 was an overwhelming Turkish victory, with Constantine and Thomas barely escaping with their lives. Turahan Bey was sent south to take Mystras and devastate Constantine's lands while Sultan Murad II led his forces in the north of the Peloponnese. Although Turahan failed to take Mystras, this was of little consequence as Murad did not wish to conquer the Morea at the time, merely to instill terror, and the Turks soon left the peninsula, devastated and depopulated. Constantine and Thomas were in no position to ask for a truce and were forced to accept Murad as their lord and pay him tribute, promising to never again restore the Hexamilion wall.

Their former co-despot Theodore died in June 1448, and on 31 October of the same year, Emperor John VIII died. The potential successors to the throne were Constantine, Demetrios and Thomas. John had not formally designated an heir, though everyone knew he favored Constantine and ultimately, the will of their mother, Helena Dragaš (who also preferred Constantine), prevailed. Both Thomas, who had no intention of claiming the throne, and Demetrios, who most certainly did, hurried to Constantinople and reached the capital before Constantine. Though Demetrios was favored by many due to his anti-unionist sentiment, Helena reserved her right to act as regent until her eldest son, Constantine arrived, stalling Demetrios's attempt at seizing the throne. Thomas accepted Constantine's appointment and Demetrios, who soon thereafter joined in proclaiming Constantine as his new emperor, was overruled. Byzantine historian and Palaiologos loyalist George Sphrantzes then informed Sultan Murad II, who also accepted the ascension of Constantine, now Emperor Constantine XI. In order to remove Demetrios from the capital and its vicinity, Constantine made Demetrios Despot of the Morea, to rule the despotate together with Thomas. Demetrios was granted Mystras and primarily ruled the southern and eastern parts of the despotate, with Thomas ruling Corinthia and the north-west, variously using Patras or Leontari as his capital.

In 1451, Sultan Murad II, by then old and tired and having let go of all intentions of conquering Constantinople, died and was succeeded as sultan by his young and vigorous son Mehmed II, who was determined above all else to take the city. In 1452, during the preparation stages of the Ottoman siege of Constantinople, Constantine XI sent an urgent message to the Morea, requesting that one of his brothers bring their forces to help him defend the city. To prevent aid coming from the Morea, Mehmed II sent Turahan Bey to devastate the peninsula once more. The Turkish attack was repelled by an army commanded by Matthaios Asan, brother-in-law of Demetrios, but this victory came too late to offer any aid to Constantinople.

=== Continued rule in the Morea ===
==== Initial tenure under Ottoman rule ====
The Despotate of the Morea c. 1450, showing the areas under control by Thomas and his brother Demetrios

Constantinople ultimately fell on 29 May 1453, Constantine XI dying in its defense, ending the Byzantine Empire. In the aftermath of Constantinople's fall, and Constantine XI's death in defense of it, one of the most pressing threats to the new Ottoman regime was the possibility that one of Constantine XI's surviving relatives would find a following and return to reclaim the empire. Luckily for Mehmed II, the two despots in the Morea represented scarcely more than a nuisance and were allowed to keep their titles and lands. When emissaries of Thomas and Demetrios visited the Sultan at Adrianople some months after Constantinople's fall, the Sultan demanded no surrender of territory, only that the despots were to pay an annual tribute of 10,000 ducats. Because the Morea was allowed to continue to exist, many Byzantine refugees fled to the despotate, which made it somewhat of a Byzantine government-in-exile. Some of these influential refugees and courtiers even raised the idea of proclaiming Demetrios, the elder brother, as the Emperor of the Romans and the legitimate successor of Constantine XI. Both Thomas and Demetrios might have considered making their small despotate the rallying point of a campaign to restore the empire, with considerable fertile and wealthy territory under the despotate's control, there did seem for a moment to be a possibility that the empire could live on in the Morea. However, Thomas and Demetrios were never able to cooperate and spent most of their resources fighting each other rather than preparing for a struggle against the Turks. Since Thomas had spent most of his life in the Morea, and Demetrios most of his life elsewhere, the two brothers hardly knew each other.

Shortly after Constantinople fell, a revolt broke out against the despots in the Morea, prompted by the many Albanian immigrants to the region being unhappy with the actions of the local Greek landowners. The Albanians had respected earlier despots, such as Constantine and Theodore, but despised the two current despots and without central authority from Constantinople, they saw their opportunity to gain control of the despotate for themselves. In Thomas's part of the despotate, the rebels chose to proclaim John Asen Zaccaria, son of the last Prince of Achaea, as their leader and in Demetrios's part of the despotate, the leader of the revolt was Manuel Kantakouzenos, grandson of Demetrios I Kantakouzenos (who had served as despot until 1384) and great-great-grandson of Emperor John VI Kantakouzenos (r. 1347–1354). With no hope of defeating the Albanians on their own, the despots appealed to the only power near enough and strong enough to aid them; the Ottomans. Mehmed II did not wish to see the despotate pass into the hands of Albanians, and out of his control, and sent an army to quell the rebellion in December 1453. The rebellion was not fully crushed until October 1454, when Turahan Bey arrived to aid the despots in firmly establishing their authority in the region. In return for the aid, Mehmed demanded a heavier tribute from Thomas and Demetrios, amounting to 12,000 ducats annually rather than the previous 10,000.

==== The possibility of Western aid ====
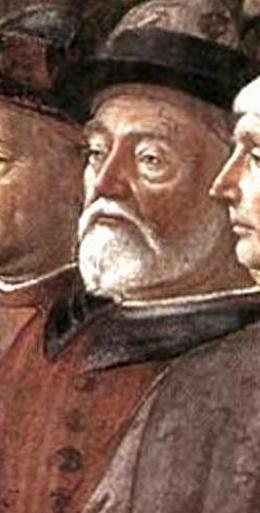
John Argyropoulos, sent as an envoy to the West by Thomas in 1456

Neither brother could raise the sum demanded by the Sultan and they were divided in their policies. While Demetrios, probably the more realistic of the two, had more or less given up hope of Christian aid from the west and thought it might be best to placate the Turks, Thomas retained hope that the Papacy might yet call for a crusade to restore the Byzantine Empire. Thomas's hopes were not ridiculous; the Fall of Constantinople had been received with as much horror in Western Europe as it had been in the few remaining Byzantine territories in the East. In September 1453, Pope Nicholas V issued the crusading bull Etsi ecclesia Christi, which called on Christians throughout the west to take the cross and embark on a crusade to recover Constantinople. The response was enthusiastic; some of Europe's most powerful and influential rulers came forward to take the cross, including Philip the Good of Burgundy in February 1454 and Alfonso the Magnanimous of Aragon and Naples in November 1455. Alfonso promised to personally lead a host of 50,000 men and 400 ships against the Ottomans. At Frankfurt, Frederick III, Holy Roman Emperor assembled a council of German princes and proposed that 40,000 men be sent to Hungary, where the Ottomans had suffered a crushing defeat at Belgrade in 1456. If the combined forces of Hungary, Aragon, Burgundy and the Holy Roman Empire had been unleashed to exploit the victory at Belgrade, Ottoman control of the Balkans would have been seriously threatened.

Despite the Ottomans having secured the position of the two despots in the recent Albanian uprising, the possibility of Western aid to restore Byzantine territory proved too enticing to resist. In 1456, Thomas sent John Argyropoulos as an envoy to the West to discuss the possibility of aid for the Morea. Argyropolous had been a carefully thought-out choice since he had been an ardent supporter of the Council of Florence, which meant that he was well received by Pope Nicholas V's successor, Pope Callixtus III, in Rome. From Rome, Argyropoulos also moved on to Milan, England and France and further envoys were sent to Aragon (because of Alfonso's involvement in the crusading plans) and Venice (since Thomas were hoping that he could secure refuge in Venetian territory in the event of an Ottoman attack on the Morea). A crusade seemed so imminent that even the decidedly anti-Western Demetrios softened his anti-Latin stance and sent envoys of his own. Argyropoulos probably arrived in Rome at around the same time as Demetrios's envoy, Frankoulios Servopoulos, and the two envoys travelled through Europe, visiting the same courts, independently of each other. Thomas and Demetrios proved to be incapable of working together even with foreign diplomacy.

==== Moreot civil war and the fall of the Morea ====
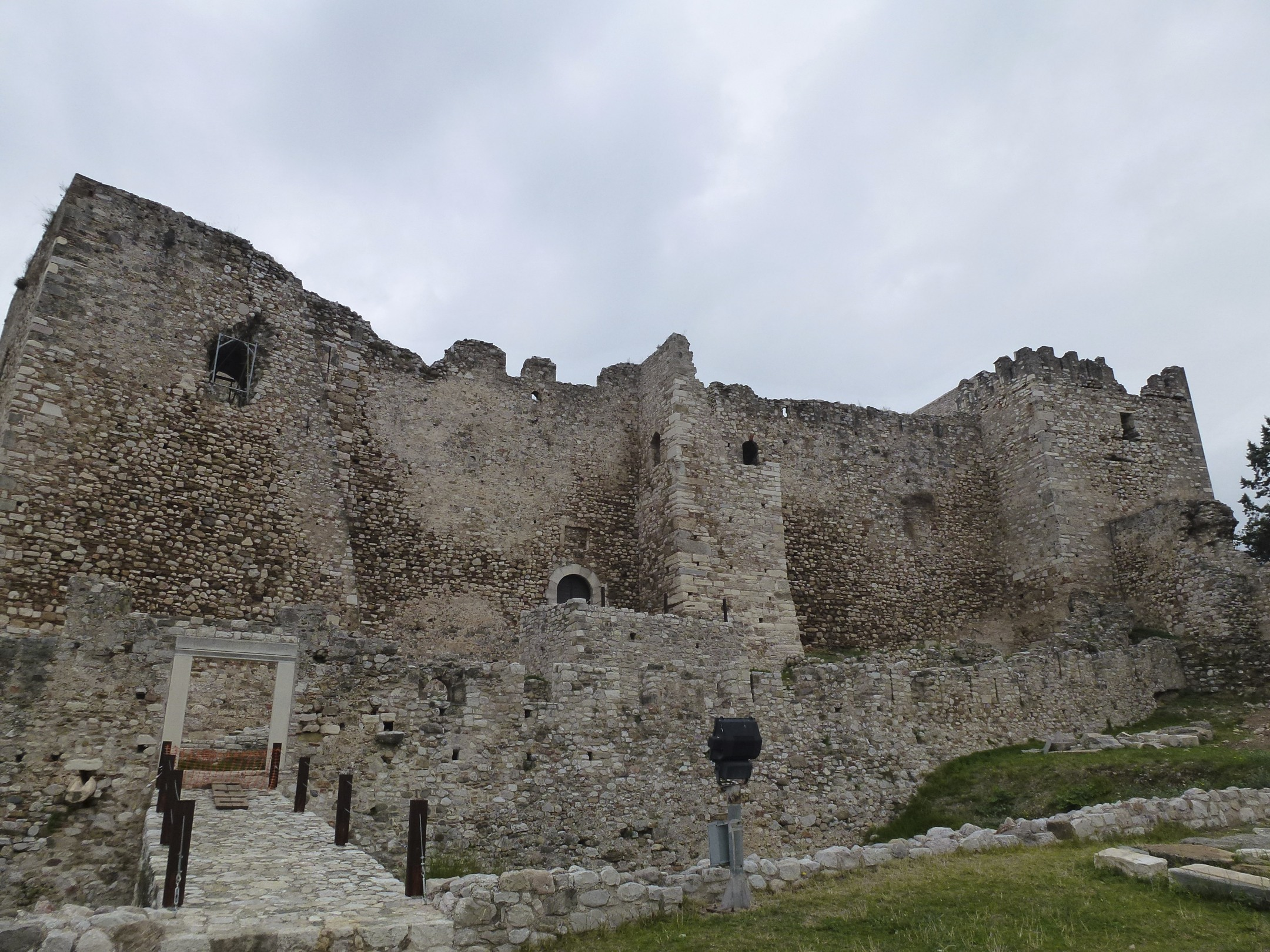
Ruins of the castle at Patras, Thomas's seat as despot from 1449 until it was taken by the Ottomans in 1458

In the end, no crusade ever set out to combat the Ottomans. Due to their conviction that help would arrive, and being unable to pay, the two despots had not paid their annual tribute to the Ottomans for three years. With no money coming from the Morea, and the looming threat of Western aid, Mehmed eventually lost his patience with the Palaiologoi. The Ottoman army marched from Adrianople in May 1458 and entered the Morea, where the only real resistance was faced at Corinth, within the domain governed by Demetrios. Leaving his artillery to bombard and besiege that city, Mehmed left with most of his army to devastate and conquer the northern parts of the despotate, under Thomas's jurisdiction. Corinth at last gave up in August, after several cities in the north had already surrendered, and Mehmed imposed a heavy retribution on the Morea. The territory under the two brothers was drastically reduced, Corinth, Patras and much of the north-west of the peninsula were annexed into the Ottoman Empire and provided with Turkish governors, with the Palaiologoi only being allowed to keep the south, including the despotate's nominal capital, Mystras, on the condition that they paid their annual tribute to the sultan.

Almost as soon as Mehmed had left the Morea, the two brothers began quarreling with each other again. Mehmed's victory had only increased the antagonism between Thomas and Demetrios. Demetrios had shifted to becoming even more pro-Ottoman after Mehmed had promised the despot that he would marry his daughter Helena, whereas Thomas increasingly hoped for western aid as the regions of the Morea annexed by Mehmed had been almost the entire area ruled by Thomas, including his capital of Patras. In January 1459, Thomas rebelled against Demetrios and the Ottomans, joining with a number of Albanian lords. They seized the fortress of Kalavryta and much of the land in the central Morea and besieged Kalamata and Mantineia, fortresses held by Demetrios. Demetrios responded by seizing Leontari and called for aid from the Turkish governors in the northern Morea. There were many attempts made to broker peace between the two brothers, such as Mehmed ordering the Bishop of Lacedaemon to make the two swear to keep the peace, but any truce lasted only briefly. Many of the Byzantine nobles in the Morea could only look on in horror as the civil war raged on. George Sphrantzes summed up the conflict with the following words:

Both brothers fought against each other with all their resources. Lord Demetrios rested his hopes on the friendship and help of the sultan, and on his claim that his subjects and castles had been wronged, while Lord Thomas relied on the fact that his opponent had committed perjury and that he was waging war against the impious.

Although Demetrios had more soldiers and resources, Thomas and the Albanians were able to appeal to the West for aid. After a successful skirmish against the Ottomans, Thomas sent 16 captured Turkish soldiers, alongside some of his armed guards, to Rome to convince the Pope that he was engaging in a holy war against the Muslims. The scheme worked and the Pope sent 300 Italian soldiers under the Milanese condottieri Gianone da Cremona to aid Thomas. With these reinforcements, Thomas gained the upper hand and it looked as if Demetrios was about to be defeated, having retreated to the town of Monemvasia and having sent Matthaios Asan to Adrianople to beg Mehmed for aid. Thomas's pleas to the west represented a real threat to the Ottomans, a threat made even greater through the support of the plan by the vocal Cardinal Bessarion, a Byzantine refugee who had escaped the empire years earlier. Pope Pius II convened a council in 1459 in Mantua and sent Bessarion and some others to preach for a crusade against the Ottomans throughout Europe.

Determined to subjugate Greece, Mehmed decided that the destruction of the despotate and its full annexation directly into his empire was the only possible solution. The sultan assembled his army once more in April 1460 and led it in person first to Corinth and then on to Mystras. Although Demetrios had ostensibly been on the sultan's side, Mehmed invaded Demetrios's territory first. Demetrios surrendered to the Ottomans without a fight, fearing retribution and already having sent his family to safety in Monemvasia. Mystras thus fell into Ottoman hands on 29 May 1460, exactly seven years after Constantinople's fall. The few places in the Morea that dared resist the Sultan's army were devastated as per Islamic law, the men being massacred and the women and children being taken away. As large numbers of Greek refugees escaped to Venetian-held territories such as Methoni and Koroni, the Morea was slowly subdued, the last resistance being led by Constantine Graitzas Palaiologos, a relative of Thomas and Demetrios, at Salmenikon in July 1461.

=== Life in exile ===
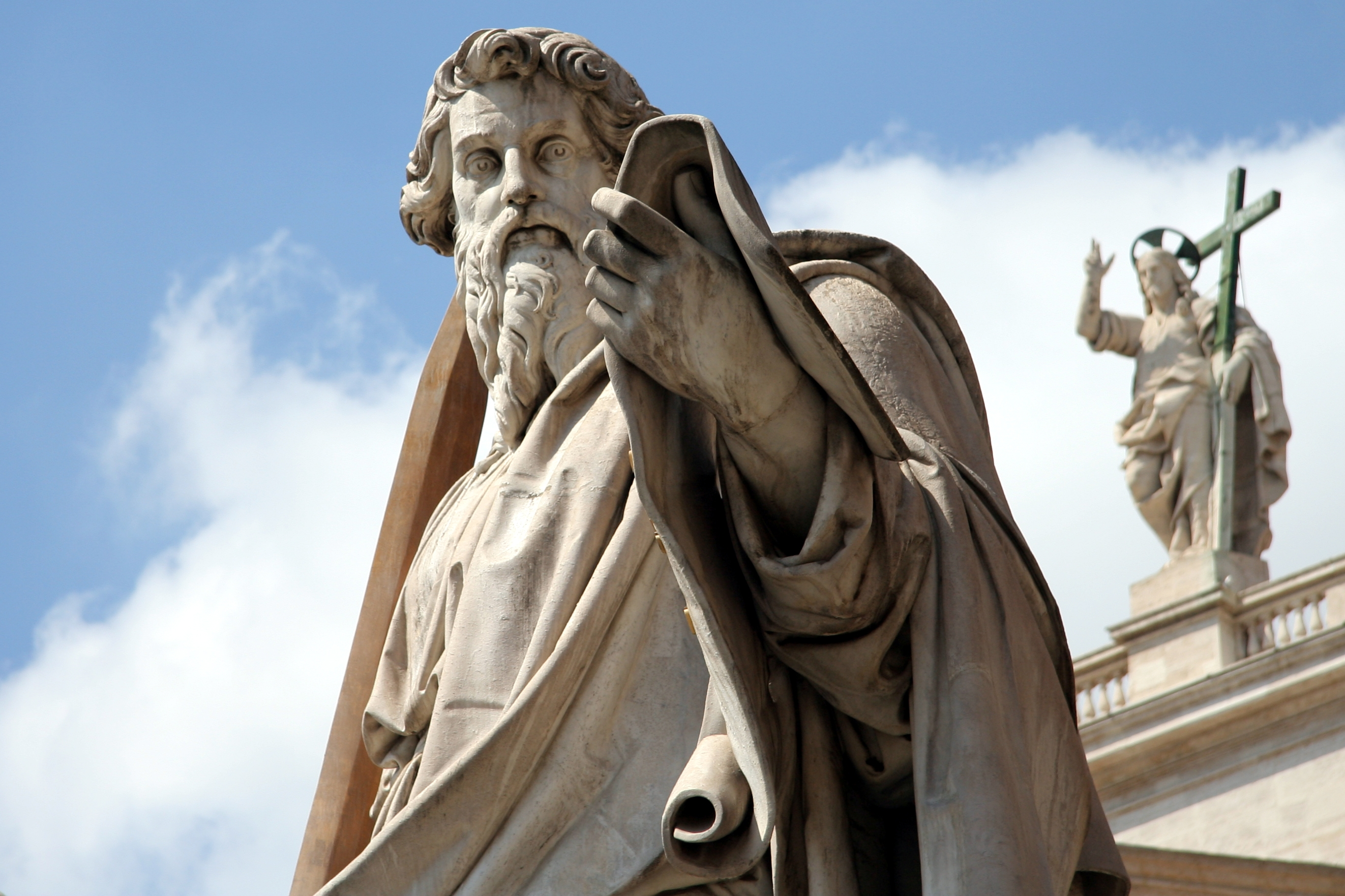
Statue of Saint Paul in front of St. Peter's Basilica in Rome. Thomas served as the model of this statue in the 1460s.

When Thomas had first heard of Mehmed's invasion, he had initially taken refuge at Mantineia to wait and see how the invasion unfolded. Once it became clear that the Ottomans were marching towards Leontari and would soon arrive outside Mantineia, Thomas, his entourage (including other Greek nobles, such as George Sphrantzes), his wife Catherine and his children Andreas, Manuel and Zoe fled to Methoni. Thomas and his companions fled to the island of Corfu on ships provided by Venice, arriving there on 22 July 1460. Although Catherine and the children stayed on Corfu, the island was only a temporary refuge for Thomas, and the local government was unwilling to allow him to stay for too long in fear of antagonizing the Ottomans. Thomas was unsure of where to travel to next, he attempted to travel to Ragusa, but the city's senate firmly rejected his arrival. Around the same time, Mehmed II sent messengers to Thomas to implore him to enter into a "treaty of friendship", promising him lands in return for his return to Greece. Unsure of what to do, Thomas sent emissaries to both Mehmed and the Papacy (to tell the Pope of his predicament). The envoy to Mehmed found the Sultan at Veria and was, despite the Sultan's words, immediately arrested and put in chains along with his entourage.

A few days later the envoy was set free and returned to Thomas at Corfu with a message; either Thomas was to come to Mehmed in person, or he was to send some of his children. In light of this, Thomas decided that he had no choice; the West was his only option. On 16 November 1460, he left his wife and children behind on Corfu and set sail for Italy, landing in Ancona. In March 1461, Thomas arrived in Rome, where he hoped to convince Pope Pius II to call for a crusade. As the brother of the final Byzantine emperor, Thomas was the highest profile ruler in exile out of all the many Christians who escaped the Balkans over the course of the Ottoman conquest.

Upon arriving in Rome, Thomas met with Pius II, who bestowed him with the Golden Rose, lodging in the Ospedale di Santo Spirito in Sassia and a pension of 300 ducats each month (for a total of 3600 annually). In addition to the papal pension, Thomas also received an additional 200 ducats a month from the cardinals and 500 ducats from the Republic of Venice, which also begged him not to return to Corfu as to not affect Venice's already tenuous relations with the Ottomans. Thomas's many followers considered the money provided to him to be barely enough to support the despot, and certainly nowhere near enough to also support themselves. The Papacy recognized Thomas as the rightful Despot of the Morea and the true heir to the Byzantine Empire, though Thomas never claimed the imperial title.

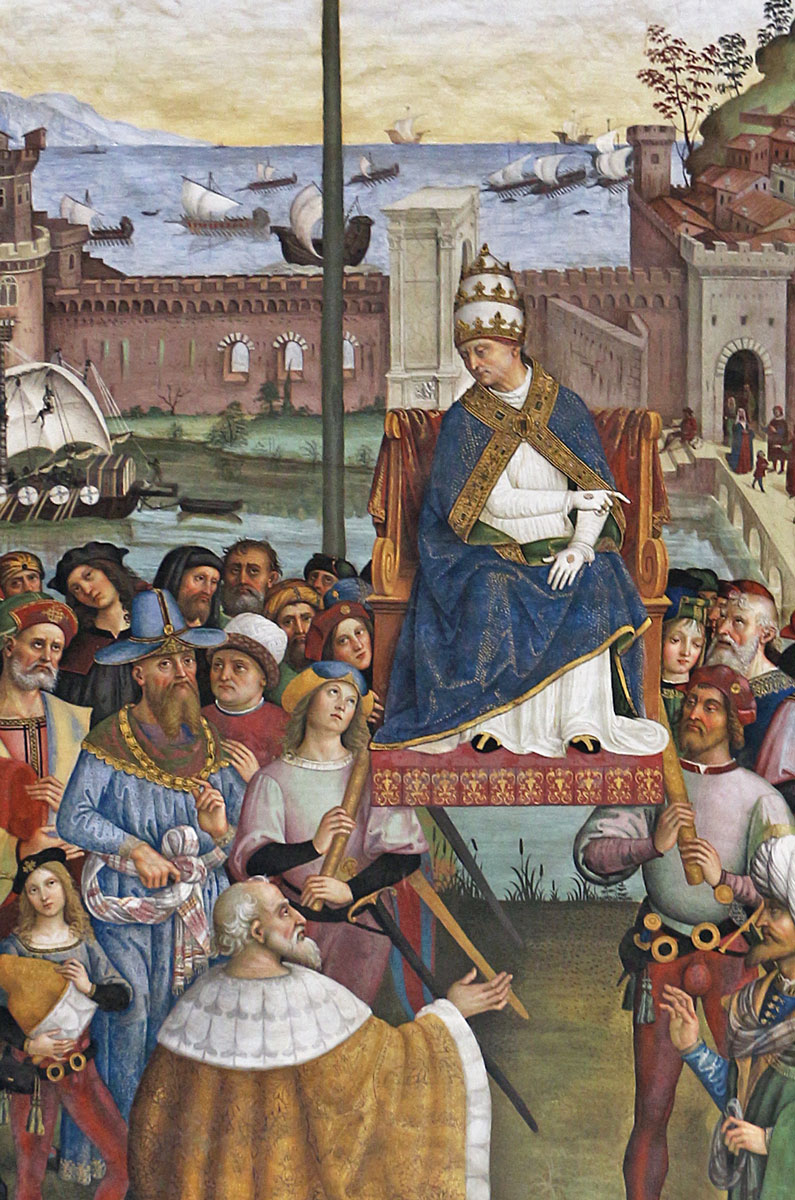
Pope Pius II's arrival at Ancona in 1464 by Pinturicchio; Thomas is the figure in the blue hat in the bottom left

During his stay in Rome, Thomas, on account of his "tall and handsome appearance", served as the model of the statue of Saint Paul which to this day stands in front of St. Peter's Basilica. On 12 April 1462, Thomas gave the supposed skull of Saint Andrew the Apostle, a precious relic which had been in Byzantine hands for centuries, to Pius II. Its arrival was viewed as highly significant by Pius II, for Andrew was St Peter's brother and was believed to have founded the church of New Rome, Constantinople, just as Peter was believed to have founded that of old Rome. Although the union of Florence had been repudiated by the mass of the Orthodox faithful the western church remained committed to it, and the arrival in Italy of Thomas, himself a uniate Catholic, bringing the head of St Andrew and seeking the protection of St Peter's Vicar, moved Pius to stage one of those great symbolic spectacles at which the Renaissance popes excelled. The ceremony, which was hailed as a return of Andrew is depicted on Pius II's grave.

In the 1460s, plans for a crusade against the Ottomans were once more underway. Pius II had made the recovery of Constantinople one of the primary goals of his pontificate and his 1459 council at Mantua had secured the promise of an army amounting to a total of 80,000 men from various of the great powers in Western Europe. Naval support for the plans was secured in 1463, when Venice formally declared war on the Ottomans as a result of Turkish incursions into their territories in Greece. In October 1463, Pius II formally declared war on the Ottoman Empire after Mehmed had refused his suggestion of converting to Christianity. While many of the Balkan exiles in the West were happy to live out their lives in obscurity, Thomas hoped to eventually restore control over Byzantine territory. As such, he staunchly supported the crusading plans.

In early 1462, Thomas left to Rome to tour Italy and drum up support for a crusade, carrying with him papal letters of indulgence. Thomas brought with him letters by Pius II who described him as "a prince who was born to the illustrious and ancient family of the Palaiologoi ... a man who is now an immigrant, naked, robbed of everything except his lineage". Like his father Manuel II and his brother John VIII before him, Thomas's possessed a certain royal charisma and good looks, which ensured that his appeals did not fall on deaf ears. The Mantuan ambassador to Rome described him as "a handsome man with a fine, serious look about him and a noble and quite lordly bearing" and Milanese ambassadors who encountered him in Venice wrote that Thomas was "as dignified as any man on Earth can be". Of the many courts Thomas visited, serious objections to his appeal was made only by Venice, where the senate made it clear that they wanted nothing to do with him. Not only did they make Thomas leave the city, but they sent ambassadors to Rome to request that he not accompany the expedition because his presence would "produce terrible and incongrous scandals". The reason for Venice's wrath against Thomas might be his advances on Venetian territories during his time as despot, or the fact that his quarreling with his brother Demetrios effectively doomed the Morean despotate. Despite Thomas's hopes, no expedition set out for Greece. When the army was ready to set sail in 1464, Pius II travelled to Ancona to join the crusade, but died there on 15 August. Without Pius II's leadership, the crusade disbanded almost immediately, with all the ships returning home one by one.

Upon the death of his wife in August 1462, Thomas summoned his children (who still remained at Corfu) to Rome, but they only arrived in the city after Thomas had died on 12 May 1465. Though Thomas had been largely bypassed and forgotten by the Roman elite after Pius II's death in 1464, he was buried with honor in St. Peter's Basilica, where his grave would survive the destruction and removal of the tombs of the Palaiologan emperors in Constantinople during the early years of Ottoman rule. Modern efforts to locate his grave within the Basilica have so far proven fruitless.

== Children and descendants ==
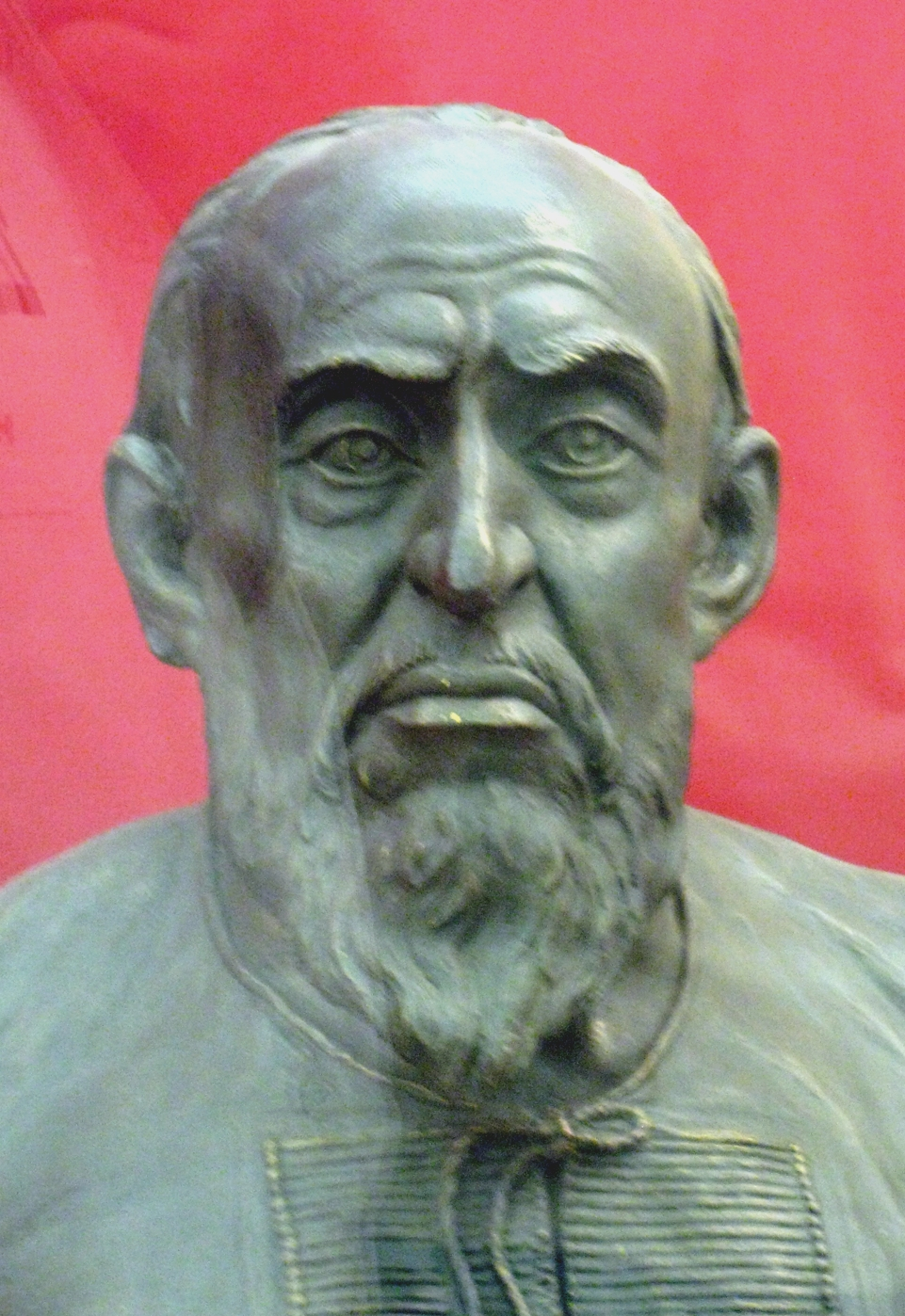
Forensical reconstruction of Ivan the Terrible, the first crowned tsar of Russia from 1547 to 1584. Thomas Palaiologos was Ivan's great-grandfather through his daughter Zoe (Sophia) Palaiologina. Blood ties to Byzantine royalty allowed Russia to strengthen its claim to being the "third Rome".

It is generally accepted that Thomas had four children with Catherine Zaccaria, the number given by George Sphrantzes. These four children were:

- Helena Palaiologina (1431 – 7 November 1473), the older of the couple's two daughters, Helena was married to Lazar Branković, a son of Đurađ Branković, Despot of Serbia. By the time of the Morea's fall, Helena had long since moved to Smederevo with her husband (who eventually became the Despot of Serbia in 1456). Lazar died in 1458 and Helena was left to care for the couple's three daughters. In 1459, Mehmed II invaded Serbia and put an end to the despotate, but Helena was allowed to leave the country. After spending some time in Ragusa, she moved to Corfu and lived there with her mother and siblings. After that, Helena became a nun and lived on the island of Lefkada, where she died in November 1473. Though Helena had many descendants through her three daughters Jelena, Milica and Jerina Brankovic, none of them carried on the Palaiologos name.
- Zoe Palaiologina (c. 1449 – 7 April 1503), the younger daughter of Thomas and Catherine, Zoe was married off to Ivan III, Grand Prince of Moscow, by Pope Sixtus IV in 1472, in the hope of converting the Russians to Roman Catholicism. The Russians did not convert, with the marriage being celebrated according to Eastern Orthodox tradition. Zoe was called "Sophia" in Russia and her marriage to Ivan III served to strengthen Moscow's claim to be the "third Rome", the ideological and spiritual successor to the Byzantine Empire. Zoe and Ivan III had several children, who in turn had numerous descendants and though none carried the Palaiologos name, many of them used the double-headed eagle iconography of Byzantium. Ivan the Terrible, Russia's first crowned tsar, was Sophia's grandson.
- Andreas Palaiologos (17 January 1453 – June 1502), the older of the couple's two sons and the third child overall, Andreas lived most of his life in Rome, surviving on a gradually declining papal pension. After Thomas's death, Andreas was recognized by the Papacy and others in Italy as the rightful heir to the Despotate of the Morea and he would later go on to claim the title Imperator Constantinopolitanus ("Emperor of Constantinople") as well, hoping to one day restore the fallen Byzantine Empire. He attempted to organize an expedition to restore the empire in 1481, but his plans failed and he later ceded the rights to the imperial title to Charles VIII of France, hoping to use him as a champion against the Turks. Andreas died poor in Rome, whether or not he had any children is uncertain. His will specified that his titles were to be granted to the Catholic Monarchs in Spain (though they never used them).
- Manuel Palaiologos (2 January 1455 – before 1512), the youngest of the four children, Manuel lived in Rome and lived off Papal money, much the same as his brother. As the pension deteriorated and Manuel (as second-in-line) did not have any titles to sell, he instead travelled Europe in search of someone to hire him in a military capacity. Failing to find satisfactory offers, Manuel surprised everyone else involved by travelling to Constantinople in 1476 and throwing himself on the mercy of Sultan Mehmed II, who graciously received him. He married an unknown woman and stayed in Constantinople for the rest of his life. Manuel had two sons, one of whom died young and another who converted to Islam and whose eventual fate is uncertain.

Sphrantzes may not have been well acquainted with Thomas's family. He gives the age of Thomas's wife at time of her death as 70, which means that she would have given birth to Manuel at the unlikely age of 65. It is known that Thomas had at least one child who is not mentioned by Sphrantzes; a daughter (whose name is unknown) who died in infancy, recorded in a funeral oration. Later sources other than the work of Sphrantzes differ considerably in the number of children ascribed to Thomas. Whereas some, such as Charles du Fresne (1680), give the same four children mentioned by Sphrantzes, others, such as Antonio Albizzi (1627) give only two children (the sons Andreas and Manuel). Leo Allatius (1648) gives three sons (John, Andreas and Manuel). This means that even a relatively short time after Thomas's death, the number of children he had was unclear.

Genealogist Peter Mallat concluded in 1985 that this uncertainty, as well as the fact that Thomas's eldest known child, Helena, was born almost twenty years before his second eldest known child, Zoe, as meaning that it is possible that Thomas had more children than the generally accepted four. Some later Italian genealogies dating to the 17th century and onwards give Thomas two more sons; a bastard son named Rogerio and a fourth legitimate son, also named Thomas. The existence of Rogerio and Thomas the Younger is overwhelmingly dismissed as fantasy in modern scholarship. There is some scant evidence of the existence of a second Thomas Palaiologos in the 15th century as a "Thomas Palaiologos, Despot of the Morea" is recorded as having married a sister of Queen Isabella of Clermont in 1444 (something Thomas could not have done as he was married at the time and ruling in the Morea). Rogerio's existence is based on a handful of unauthenticated documents and the oral tradition of his supposed descendants, the "Paleologo Mastrogiovanni". Though the individual documents themselves have little questionable content, they are contradictory when examined as a whole and do not necessarily corroborate Thomas having a son by the name Rogerio. Sphrantzes wrote on the birth of Andreas Palaiologos on 17 January 1453 that the boy was "a continuator and heir" of the Palaiologan lineage, a phrase which makes little sense if Andreas was not Thomas's first-born son (if they would have existed, both Rogerio and Thomas the Younger would have been older than Andreas).

In the late 16th century, a family with the last name Paleologus, living in Pesaro in Italy, claimed descent from Thomas through a supposed third son, called John. This family later mainly lived in Cornwall and contained figures such as Theodore Paleologus, who worked as a soldier and hired assassin, and Ferdinand Paleologus, who retired in Barbados in the late 17th century. The existence of a son of Thomas called John cannot be proven with any certainty as no mention is made of a son by that name in contemporary records. It is possible that John was a real historical figure, possibly an illegitimate son of Thomas, or perhaps his grandson through of either of his known sons, Andreas or Manuel. John's existence could be corroborated by the mention of a son by this name by Allatius in 1648 (though this is too late to act as an independent source) and contemporary documents in Pesaro discussing a Leone Palaiologos (the names Leone and John are similar in their Latin forms; Leonis and Ioannes) as living there.

== See also ==
- Succession to the Byzantine Empire

Thomas Palaiologos Palaiologos dynasty Born: 1409 Died: 12 May 1465
Regnal titles
Preceded by Theodore II Palaiologos	Despot of the Morea; 1428–1460 with Theodore II Palaiologos, 1428–1443; Constantine Palaiologos, 1428–1449; Demetrios Palaiologos, 1449–1460	Ottoman conquest of the Morea
Titles in pretence
Loss of title Loss of the Morea	— TITULAR — Despot of the Morea; 1460–1465	Succeeded by Andreas Palaiologos
