= Frankoulios Servopoulos =

Frankoulios Servopoulos (Greek: Φραγγούλιος Σερβόπουλος; fl. 1442–1474) was a Byzantine official in Constantinople and the Despotate of the Morea and an émigré to Italy.

Servopoulos is attested for the first time in 1442, being in the service of the Venetian Bailo of Constantinople, Marco Quirini. He then served the Byzantine emperors John VIII Palaiologos (r. 1425–1449) and Constantine XI Palaiologos (r. 1448–1453) as a member of the supreme tribunal of the kritai katholikoi.

After the Fall of Constantinople he moved to the Despotate of the Morea where he served Despot Demetrios Palaiologos. In this capacity he corresponded with King Alfonso V of Aragon and was sent as the Despot's envoy to Italy in 1456, hoping to secure Western support against the Ottoman Empire. He is last attested in 1474, in the entourage of Anna Notaras.

== Sources ==
- Trapp, Erich; Beyer, Hans-Veit; Walther, Rainer; Sturm-Schnabl, Katja; Kislinger, Ewald; Leontiadis, Ioannis; Kaplaneres, Sokrates (1976–1996). Prosopographisches Lexikon der Palaiologenzeit (in German). Vienna: Verlag der Österreichischen Akademie der Wissenschaften. ISBN 3-7001-3003-1.
- Vakalopoulos, Apostolos E. (1974). Ιστορία του νέου ελληνισμού, Τόμος Α′: Αρχές και διαμόρφωσή του (Έκδοση Β′) [History of modern Hellenism, Volume I: Its origins and formation] (in Greek) (2nd ed.). Thessaloniki: Emm. Sfakianakis & Sons.
