= Mesembria =

Ancient Greek city in Thrace

Coordinates: 42°39′31″N 27°43′51″E

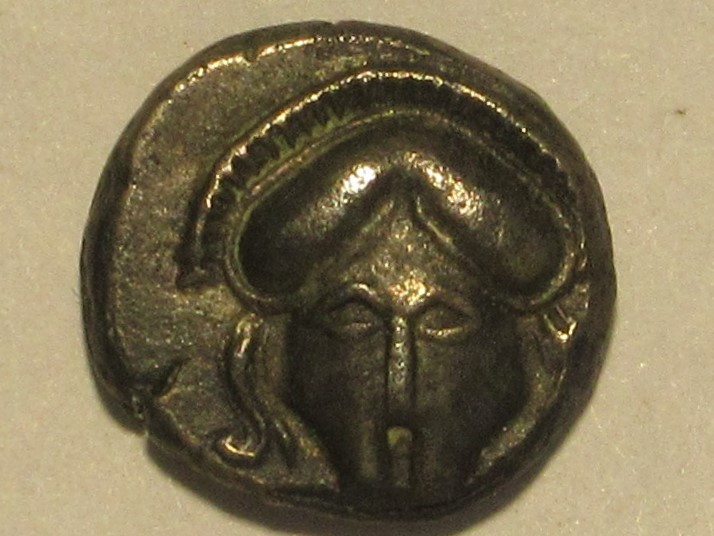
Diobol from Mesembria, ca. 450–350 BCE

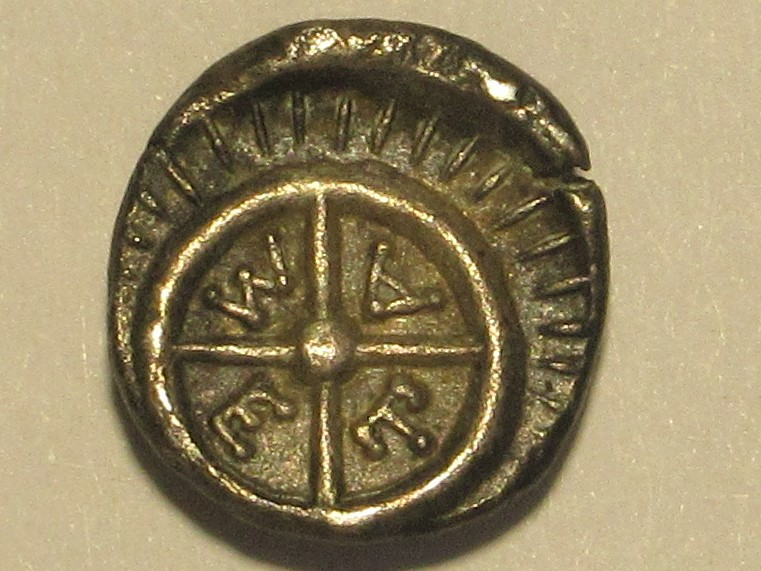
Reverse of the coin, M-E-T-A among spokes.

Mesembria (Ancient Greek: Μεσημβρία; Doric Greek: Μεσαμβρία, romanized: Mesambria) was an important Greek city in ancient Thrace. It was situated on the coast of the Euxine and at the foot of Mount Haemus; consequently upon the confines of Moesia, in which it is placed by Ptolemy. Strabo relates that it was a colony of Dorians from Megara, and that it was originally called Menebria (Μενεβρία) after its founder Menas; Stephanus of Byzantium says that its original name was Melsembria (Μελσημβρία), from its founder Melsas; and both writers state that the termination -bria was the Thracian word for town. According to the Anonymous Periplus of the Euxine Sea, Mesembria was founded by Chalcedonians at the time of the expedition of Darius I against Scythia; but according to Herodotus it was founded a little later, after the suppression of the Ionic Revolt, by fugitives from Byzantium and Chalcedon. These statements may, however, be reconciled by supposing that the Thracian town was originally colonized by Megarians, and afterwards received additional colonists from Byzantium and Chalcedon.

Mesembria was one of the cities, forming the Greek Pentapolis on the Euxine, the other four being Odessus, Tomi, Istriani and Apolloniatae. Mesembria is rarely mentioned in history, but it continued to exist till a late period, being recorded by Pomponius Mela, Pliny the Elder, and Ptolemy, and appearing in the Peutinger Table. The Dorian colonisation is dated to the beginning of the 6th century BCE, and evidence shows that it was an important trading centre from then on and a rival of Apollonia (Sozopol). It remained the only Dorian colony along the Black Sea coast, as the rest were typical Ionian colonies. At 425/4 BCE the town joined the Delian League, under the leadership of Athens.

== Archaeology ==
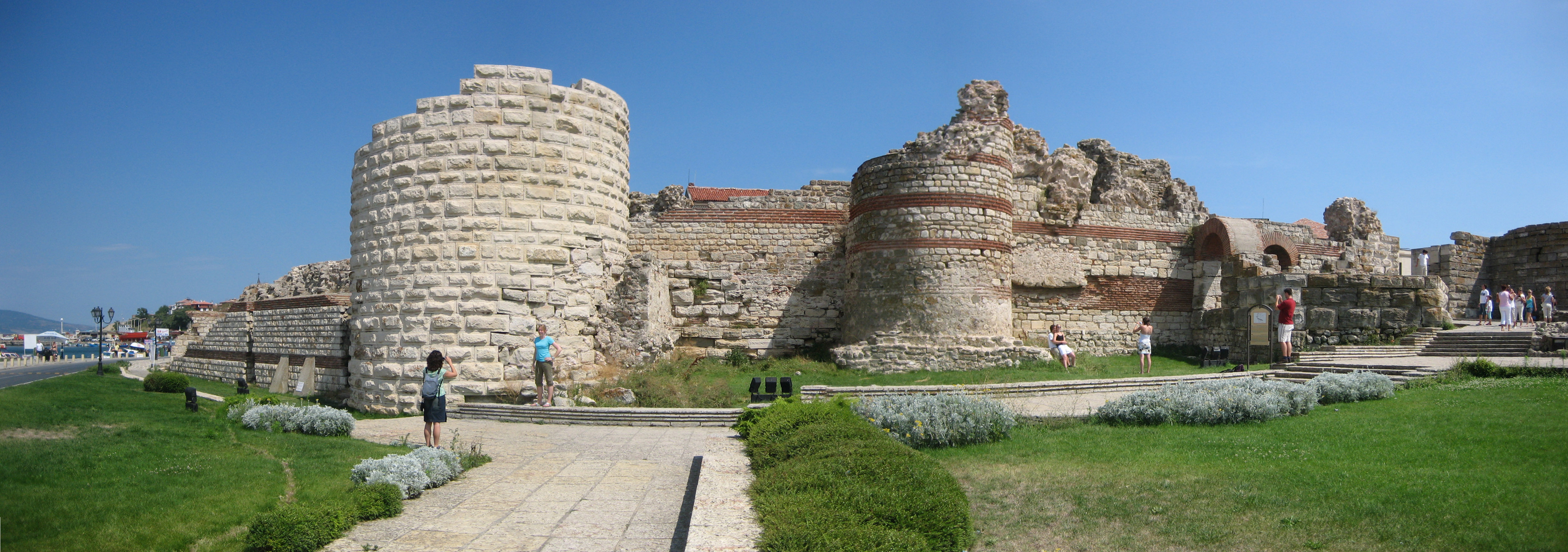
Fortifications at the entrance of Nesebar

Bulgarian archaeologist Lyuba Ognenova-Marinova led six underwater archaeological expeditions for the Bulgarian Academy of Sciences (BAS) between 1961 and 1972 in the waters along the Bulgarian Black Sea Coast. Her work led to the identification of five chronological periods of urbanization on the peninsula surrounding Nesebar through the end of the second millennium BCE, which included the Thracian protopolis, the Greek colony Mesambria, a Roman-ruled village to the Early Christian Era, the Medieval settlement and a Renaissance era town, known as Mesemvria or Nessebar.

Remains date mostly from the Hellenistic period and include the acropolis, a temple of Apollo and an agora. A wall which formed part of the Thracian fortifications can still be seen on the north side of the peninsula.

Bronze and silver coins were minted in the city since the 5th century BCE and gold coins since the 3rd century BCE. The town fell under Roman rule in 71 BCE, yet continued to enjoy privileges such as the right to mint its own coinage.

Mesembria had a theatre, the remains of which have yet to be discovered. However, inscriptions suggest its existence and indicate that it was constructed in the late 4th or early 3rd century BCE.

== Famous landmarks ==
- Basilica of St. Sofia
- Basilica of Holy Mother of God Eleusa
- Late Antique Baths
- Church of St. Demetrios
- Church of St. Stephen
- Church of the Archangels
- Church of St. John the Baptist
- Church of St. Theodore
- Church of Christ Pantokrator
- Church of St. Paraskeva
- Church of St. John Aliturgetos
- Nesebar Archaeological Museum
