= Catherine Le Maure =

Baroness of Arcadia
- Reign: 1386/88–1401
- Predecessor: Erard III
- Successor: Erard Zaccaria
- Spouse: Andronikos Asen Zaccaria
- Issue: Centurione, Erard, Benedict, Stephen
- House: Le Maure
- Father: Erard III Le Maure
- Religion: Roman Catholic

Catherine Le Maure was a French noblewoman of the Principality of Achaea. She was the de facto Baroness of Arcadia and Lady of Saint-Sauveur. She was the eldest daughter of the Erard III Le Maure, Baron of Arcadia. She had two sisters, Lucie and Marie and a brother that died young. At the end of the 14th century Catherine married to Andronikos Asen Zaccaria, the leader of the great Genoese Zaccaria house of Morea. Andronikos was one of the strongest men inside the Principality as Grand Constable of Achaea and Baron of Chalandritsa, Estamira and Lysarea.

Catherine, like other princesses in the history of the Principality of Achaea such as Isabella Villehardouin or Matilda of Hainaut, was one of the most desired brides, as she was heiress of Arcadia, and many lords wished to add her lands to their domain through a matrimonial union. The marriage ceremony with Andronikos followed the Greek orthodox rite.

The rights of Andronikos and Catherine under Arcadia were challenged by John Laskaris Kalopheros, husband of her sister Lucie Le Maure and their son and heir Erard Laskaris. Erard III compensated his son in law John with money and a house in Modon. After 1388, a lament upon the death of Erard III Le Maure was added into the narrative of the Chronicle of Morea, likely to have been carried out by members of the baron's own family relatively soon after the death, presumably on the environment of Catherine and Andronikos.

Centurione, her eldest son, named his daughter Catherine Zaccaria after his Le Maure mother. This princess later married to Thomas Palaiologos, becoming Despoina of Morea.

Catherine and Andronikos had four sons:

1. Centurione II (died 1432): Baron of Chalandritsa and Bailee for Maria II Zaccaria. On 1404 King Ladislaus of Naples appointed and confirmed Centurione as Prince of Achaea.
2. Erard IV of Arcadia: Andronikos and Catherine inherited the Barony of Arcadia to Erard that Catherine christened after her father. When Erard IV died Arcadia passed to his eldest brother Centurione.
3. Benedict: little is known of Benedict. In 1418 he was present in Glarentza defending the city against the forces of Olivier Franco. He was imprisoned by Franco and then ransomed.
4. Stephen (died 1424): Latin Archbishop of Patras. He carried the name of Stephen Le Maure, grandfather of Catherine.
