= Centurione I Zaccaria =

Lord and Bailee of the Principality of Achaea

Centurione Zaccaria

Grand Constable of the Principality of Achaea
- Reign: 1370-1382

Baron of Damala
- Reign: 1334-1382
- Predecessor: Martino Zaccaria and Jacqueline de la Roche

Baron of Chalandritsa
- Reign: 1345-1382
- Predecessor: Martino Zaccaria and Jacqueline de la Roche

Baron of Estamira
- Reign: 1370-1382
- Predecessor: Phillip II of Taranto

Lord of Lisarea
- Reign: ?-1382
- Predecessor: Lady Asenina
- Died: 1382
- Spouse: Lady Asenina
- Issue: Andronikos Filippo Martino Manuele Maria
- House: Zaccaria
- Father: Martino Zaccaria
- Mother: Jacqueline de la Roche
- Religion: Roman Catholic

Centurione I Zaccaria was one of the most powerful nobles of the Principality of Achaea in the 14th century. He was the firstborn son of Martino Zaccaria and Jacqueline de la Roche, last representant of the prestigious Burgundian house of the Duchy of Athens. In 1334 Centurione succeeded his brother, Bartolomeo Zaccaria as baron of Damala. After the death of Martino he rose as lord of one half of the Barony of Chalandritsa, and in 1359 he acquired the other half. In about 1370 he was named Grand Constable of Achaea and received also the Barony of Estamira. He also thrice held the post of bailli (viceroy) for the principality's Angevin rulers.

== Lord of Damala and prominence in Latin Morea ==
On 1329 Martino Zaccaria, father of Centurione was imprisoned by Andronikos III Palaiologos and he was expelled from the administration of the island of Chios, however during his imprisonment and later it was Centurione that governed the Zaccaria estates in Morea. He was so successful in the Principality that the Zaccarias considered themselves to be practically independent from the Napolitan suzerainty.

Nicholas of Boyano, a bailee for Prince-Emperor Robert of Taranto and his consort Marie of Bourbon, authored a report on 1360-1361 for Princess-Empress Marie where Centurione is excessively mentioned. According to his words, Zaccaria didn't offer feudal services and payments to his Neapolitan overlords. Boyano noted that he would need more than two days to record all the complaints he heard about Centurione's excesses in Morea. Nicholas sent him a command to make amends for damage done to the properties of Marie. Still, Centurione responded, "with bland words acting as if he were Prince William of Villehardouin himself come back to life". Nicholas could not bend down the insolent baron and named him "a tyrant". He warned the Empress that Zaccaria should be subdued if she and her son wished to have real authority in Romaniae.

After the death of Emperor Robert on 1364, the leading prelates, barons and knights of the Principality gathered at Glarentza and proclaimed Centurione Bailee of the Principality. Then Centurione travelled to Naples were the new Prince Philip II bestowed him the appropriate rank. During his reign (1364–1373) Philip appointed seven different bailees and one special emissary to lead the Principality on his absence, some of whom were not native barons, thus bringing considerable instability to the Principality. At 1370 Philip granted to Centurione the castle of Estamira and all the barony that until then was a princely domain. After Philips death, the Principality of Achaea and all his Greek lands were claimed by his sister Margarita and her husband Francis of Baux for themselves and their son James. Meanwhile, Queen Joanna of Naples decided to exercise direct rule over Achaea of which she had long being a surzerain. The barons of Morea sent an important delegation to Naples so to examine the rights of the two sides respecting the Principality. Its members were the greatest lords of the Principality: Erard III Le Maure of the Messenian Barony of Arcadia, Centurione Zaccaria, the Baron of Chalandritsa, Damala, Estamira, John II Misito, Baron of Molines and Leonardo I Tocco, the Count of Cephalonia, made count by Prince Robert and subject to the Prince of Achaea. The embassy decided in favor of the Queen and did homage to her after she had sworn to respect the usages and customs of the Principality, as other previous princes before her.

== Dealings with the Byzantine world ==
Centurione desired to build family ties with the imperial families that governed the Eastern Roman Empire. He married a daughter of Andronikos Asen, who had served as Epitropos (stewart) of Morea for his uncle Andronikos II Palaiologos. Andronikos Asen was a grandson of Michael VIII Palaiologos as he was the son of his firstborn daughter Irene Palaiologina, also empress of the Bulgars. The name of Centurione's wife does not survive. However, we know that this Asenina brought the fiefs of Lisarea and Maniatochorion as her dowry to her Zaccaria husband.

During the Smyrniote Crusade, Centurione was appointed by Pope Clement VI as one of the two commanders of the Papacy forces that would join the Crusade. He also held the Byzantine title of Protokomes and was known as the Protokomes of Chios or Protokomes Damalas. Protokomes was a naval officer and it was a title introduced during the Palaiologian period. It derived by the kometes of the fleet, a naval title popular in the middle Byzantine period. According to Pseudo-Kodinos it ranked 75th in court hierarchy.

Centurione maintained good ties with the Empress Anne of Savoy that for a time acted as regent of the Eastern Roman Empire. He was given lands and fiefs on Chios and Phocaea and governed the island along with other nobles entrusted by the imperial government. On 1352 he signed as a witness "the first among all the latins" to a treaty of Genoa with Emperor John VI Kantakouzenos. Centurione belonged to the Guelph party, loyal to the Holy See. They were the Genoese Guelphs that helped John IV Palaiologos take the throne by John VI Kantakouzenos on 1354.

As evidenced by his son Andronikos inheriting his titles, he died before 1382, during his third bailliage.

== Family ==
Centurione married to the Asenina, a daughter of Andronikos Asen with the wedding ceremony following the Greek orthodox rite. The couple had the following children:

- Andronikos Asano de Damala, Baron of Chalandritsa, Arcadia, Estamira. Grand Constable of the Principality, father of Centurione II Zaccaria, Prince of Achaea in 1404–1432. He was baptised with the name of his Greek grandfather.
- Filippo Zaccaria, married the heiress of Rhiolo in Morea.
- Martino Zaccaria, known only from his participation in the Battle of Gardiki in 1375.
- Manuele Zaccaria, married Eliana Cattaneo.
- Maria II Zaccaria, married Pedro de San Superano, Prince of Achaea in 1396–1402. Later Maria acted as reigning princess of Achaea in 1402–1404. She is the first woman to be attested as Maria in the family tree of house Zaccaria.

== Sources ==
- Bon, Antoine (1969). La Morée franque. Recherches historiques, topographiques et archéologiques sur la principauté d'Achaïe (in French). Paris: De Boccard.
- Hopf, Carl Hermann Friedrich Johann (1873). Chroniques Gréco-Romanes Inédites ou peu Connues. Berlin, Germany: Librairie de Weidmann.
