= Guy of Dramelay =

- Baron of Chalandritsa
- Reign: before 1280 – 1285/86
- Predecessor: Robert of Dramelay
- Successor: George I Ghisi
- Died: 1285/86
- Religion: Roman Catholic

Guy (II) of Dramelay (French: Guy de Dramelay; died 1285/86) was the third Baron of Chalandritsa in the Principality of Achaea in Frankish Greece, and also bailli of the Principality in 1282–85.

== Life ==
Guy was a scion of the Dramelay (or Trimolay, Tremolay) family from the namesake village in Burgundy, who had held the Barony of Chalandritsa since 1209, when a "G. of Dramelay" (possibly "Guy", in which case this would be Guy I) is attested among the signatories of the Treaty of Sapienza. Many older histories, following Jean Alexandre Buchon and Karl Hopf, have Audebert de la Trémouille as the first baron. His successor, Robert, is attested ca. 1230. It was he who built the castle of Chalandritsa, according to the Greek and Italian versions of the Chronicle of the Morea. He was in turn succeeded by his son Guy (II). The Aragonese version of the Chronicle on the other hand reports a completely different story, according to which the castle of Chalandritsa had been built by Conrad of Aleman, Baron of Patras, and that it and other lands, comprising eight knight's fiefs, were purchased around 1259 by Prince William II of Villehardouin and given to a knight named Guy of Dramelay, who had only recently arrived in the Morea. While otherwise reliable, the Aragonese version is considered erroneous in this regard.

Guy's tenure as a baron is relatively obscure. In 1280, he is known to have enlarged the barony by acquiring neighbouring lands such as parts of the Lisarea or the fief of Mitopoli. In November 1282, Guy was named bailli of the Principality for the King of Naples instead of Narjot de Toucy, whose duties as Admiral of the kingdom did not allow him to take up the post. Guy held the position until 1285, when he was replaced by the Duke of Athens, William I de la Roche. Guy died shortly after, either in late 1285 or in early 1286, leaving his barony to an unnamed daughter, who married George I Ghisi, heir to Tinos and Mykonos.

== Sources ==
- Bon, Antoine (1969). La Morée franque. Recherches historiques, topographiques et archéologiques sur la principauté d'Achaïe [The Frankish Morea. Historical, Topographic and Archaeological Studies on the Principality of Achaea] (in French). Paris: De Boccard.
- Longnon, Jean (1969) [1962]. "The Frankish States in Greece, 1204–1311". In Setton, Kenneth M.; Wolff, Robert Lee; Hazard, Harry W. (eds.). A History of the Crusades, Volume II: The Later Crusades, 1189–1311. Vol. 2 (Second ed.). Madison, Milwaukee, and London: University of Wisconsin Press. pp. 234–275. ISBN 0-299-04844-6.

Regnal titles
Preceded by Robert of Dramelay	Baron of Chalandritsa before 1280 – 1285/86	Succeeded by George I Ghisi (jure uxoris)
Government offices
Preceded by Narjot of Toucy	Angevin bailli in the Principality of Achaea; 1282–1285	Succeeded by William I de la Roche
