= Maria Zaccaria =

Princess of Achaea

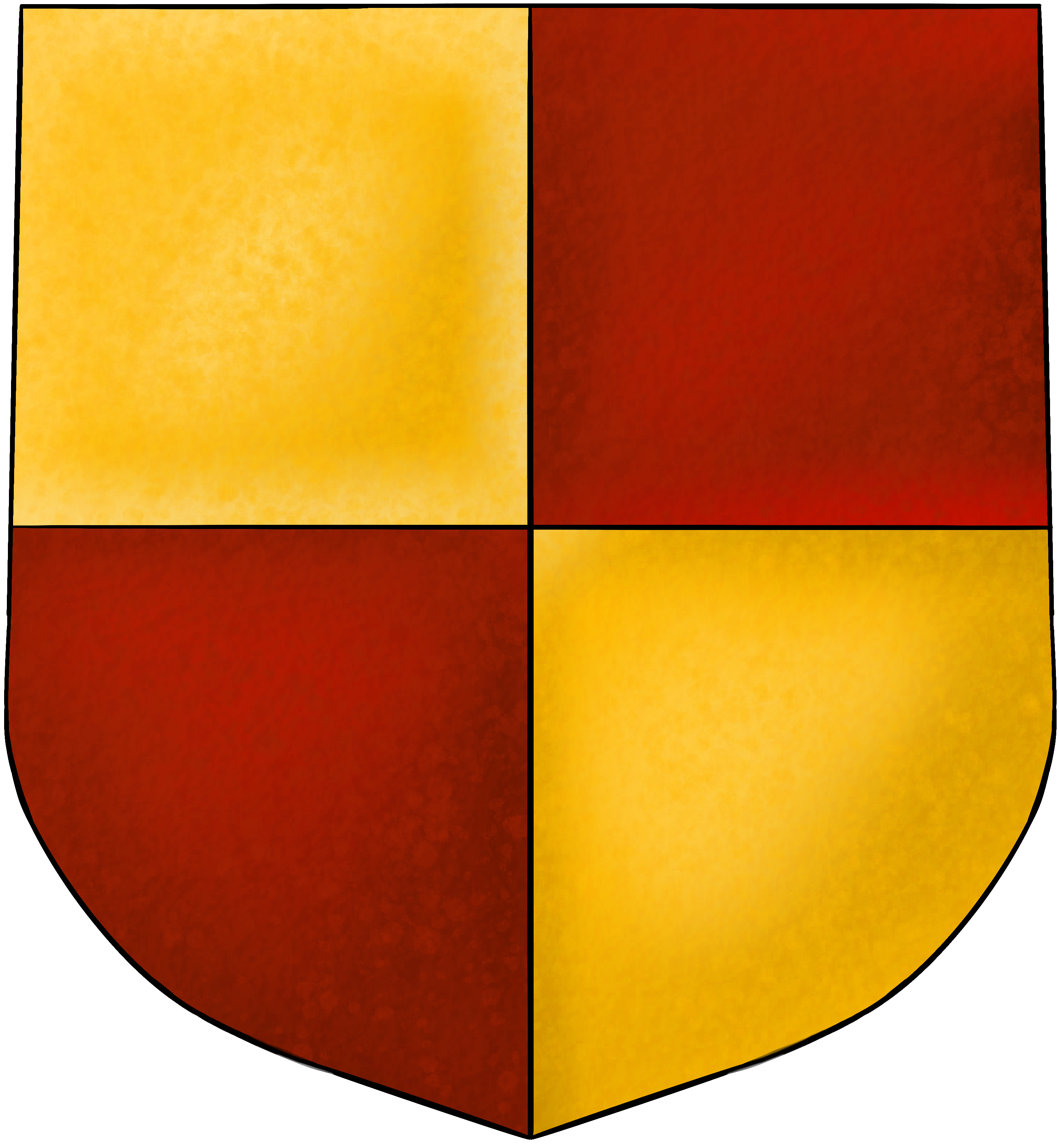

Princess consort of Achaea
- Tenure: 1396-1402

Princess Regnant of Achaea
- Tenure: 1402–1404
- Died: after 1404
- Spouse: Pedro de San Superano
- Issue: names unknown
- House: Zaccaria
- Father: Centurione I Zaccaria
- Mother: Helene? Asanina

Maria II Zaccaria (14th century – after 1404) was a Princess of Achaea.

She was daughter of Centurione I Zaccaria, Baron of Damala, Chalandritsa, Estamira and of Helene? Asanina, his Byzantine wife, daughter of Andronikos Asan. Although Maria is sometimes attributed the name Asanina in historiography, she does not appear to have employed it.

Maria's mother is likely to be identified as Helene, a younger sister of the Byzantine Empress Irene Asanina. Through her mother Maria descended from the imperial families of the Palaiologoi, Komnenoi, Angeloi, and Asenids. Maria had three known brothers: Andronico, Filippo, and Martino. She married Pedro de San Superano, leader of the Navarrese Company from 1386 and the de facto ruler of Achaea, later invested as Prince of Achaea by King Ladislaus of Naples in 1396. After Pedro's death in November 1402, Maria ruled the Principality as regent for one of her underage sons for 2 years; the names of her children, who included possibly two or more sons, are not recorded.

Once she assumed power, Maria appointed her ambitious nephew Centurione II Zaccaria, the son of her brother Andronikos, as her bailee, a choice that ended up being the undoing of her reign. In the past, Pedro had promised his suzerain, King Ladislaus of Naples, 3000 ducats in exchange for the title of Prince of Achaea, but he never paid the amount. King Ladislaus renewed his demands by asking Maria to pay him the ducats immediately, something that Maria did not. Centurione acted secretly and dispatched a trusted person in Naples to inform Ladislaus that Maria and her children could not pay him the money but that he himself was eager to pay as long as he was recognized the sole ruler of the Principality. Ladislaus accepted the unexpected offer by Centurione and declared him prince of Achaea, to the exclusion of Maria and her son, on 20 April 1404.

King Ladislaus justified his decision by stating that Maria and her son demonstrated a punishable audacity by not renewing the feudal oath of the Princes of Achaea to Naples. After their dispossession, Maria and her children disappear from the historical record. During her brief reign, based on her letters, it seems that Maria resided at the city of Patras, where we see her holding discussions with Venice about the appointment of a Venetian prelate.

== Sources ==
- Bon, Antoine (1969). La Morée franque. Recherches historiques, topographiques et archéologiques sur la principauté d'Achaïe [The Frankish Morea. Historical, Topographic and Archaeological Studies on the Principality of Achaea] (in French). Paris: De Boccard. OCLC 869621129.
- Fine, John V. A. Jr. (1994) [1987]. The Late Medieval Balkans: A Critical Survey from the Late Twelfth Century to the Ottoman Conquest. Ann Arbor, Michigan: University of Michigan Press. ISBN 978-0-472-10079-8.
- Božilov, Ivan, Familijata na Asenevci (1186–1460): genealogija i prosopografija, Sofia, 1985.
- Setton, Kenneth M.; Hazard, Harry W., eds. (1975). A History of the Crusades, Volume III: The Fourteenth and Fifteenth Centuries. Vol. 3. Madison and London: University of Wisconsin Press. ISBN 0-299-06670-3.
- Thomopoulos, Stephanos (1999). Iστορία της Πόλεως Πατρών (in Greek). Patras: Achaikes Ekdoseis. ISBN 960-7960-09-2.
- Topping, Peter (1975). "The Morea, 1364–1460". In Setton, Kenneth M.; Hazard, Harry W. (eds.). A History of the Crusades, Volume III: The Fourteenth and Fifteenth Centuries. Vol. 3. Madison and London: University of Wisconsin Press. pp. 141–166. ISBN 0-299-06670-3.

Regnal titles
Preceded by Pedro de San Superano	Princess of Achaea; 1402–1404	Succeeded by Centurione II Zaccaria
