= Stephen Zaccaria =

Stephen Zaccaria was the youngest brother of the last Prince of Achaea, Centurione II Zaccaria, and Latin Archbishop of Patras from 1404 until his death in 1424.

== Life ==
Stephen was the youngest of the four sons of Andronikos Asen Zaccaria, Grand Constable of Achaea and Baron of Chalandritsa and Arcadia. In 1404, he was elected as Latin Archbishop of Patras. In April 1404, Stephen's elder brother Centurione II Zaccaria succeeded in replacing his aunt, Maria II Zaccaria, as ruler of the Principality of Achaea.

Despite their kinship, Centurione and Stephen were not always aligned: in 1406–07, Stephen allied himself with Carlo I Tocco and the Byzantine Despot of the Morea, Theodore I Palaiologos, in the latter's unsuccessful attempts to overthrow Centurione and capture his domains. In 1408 Stephen, threatened by mounting Ottoman raids in the Peloponnese and faced with financial difficulties, decided to lease the administration of Patras to the Republic of Venice for five years, in exchange for an annual fee of 1,000 ducats. This move suited the strategic interests of the Republic, as together with Lepanto, Patras gave it control of the entrance to the Corinthian Gulf. In 1418, threatened by the advances of the Byzantines in Messenia, Stephen once again turned to Venice for protection, calling on Venice to send troops from Negroponte to garrison Patras. The Republic accepted, but the Venetian troops had to withdraw in 1419 due to the opposition of the Pope, who was concerned lest Patras, a possession of the Church, fall permanently under Venetian control.

Faced with renewed offensives by the Byzantines, in early 1422, both Centurione and Stephen contacted the Knights Hospitaller, offering to surrender their domains to them, but the Hospitallers refused to become involved, citing their commitments against the Ottomans in the southeastern Aegean. Venice then tried to intervene and buy the entire Peloponnese from the various local rulers, or at least organize an effective league against the Ottoman threat, but the negotiations in 1422–23 failed to achieve any result.

On 8 January 1424, on his deathbed, Stephen placed Patras under the protection of Venice, but the Pope, who continued to oppose the growing Venetian influence in the area, named Pandolfo Malatesta as Stephen's successor instead of a Venetian cleric. Five years later, Patras would fall to the Despot of the Morea, Constantine Palaiologos.

== Sources ==
- Bon, Antoine (1969). La Morée franque. Recherches historiques, topographiques et archéologiques sur la principauté d'Achaïe [The Frankish Morea. Historical, Topographic and Archaeological Studies on the Principality of Achaea] (in French). Paris: De Boccard. OCLC 869621129.
- Topping, Peter (1975). "The Morea, 1311–1364". In Setton, Kenneth M.; Hazard, Harry W. (eds.). A History of the Crusades, Volume III: The Fourteenth and Fifteenth Centuries. Vol. 3. Madison and London: University of Wisconsin Press. pp. 104–140. ISBN 0-299-06670-3.

Preceded by Angelo II Acciaioli	Latin Archbishop of Patras; 1404–1424	Succeeded by Pandolfo Malatesta
