= Jacques Auguste de Thou =

French historian (1553–1617)

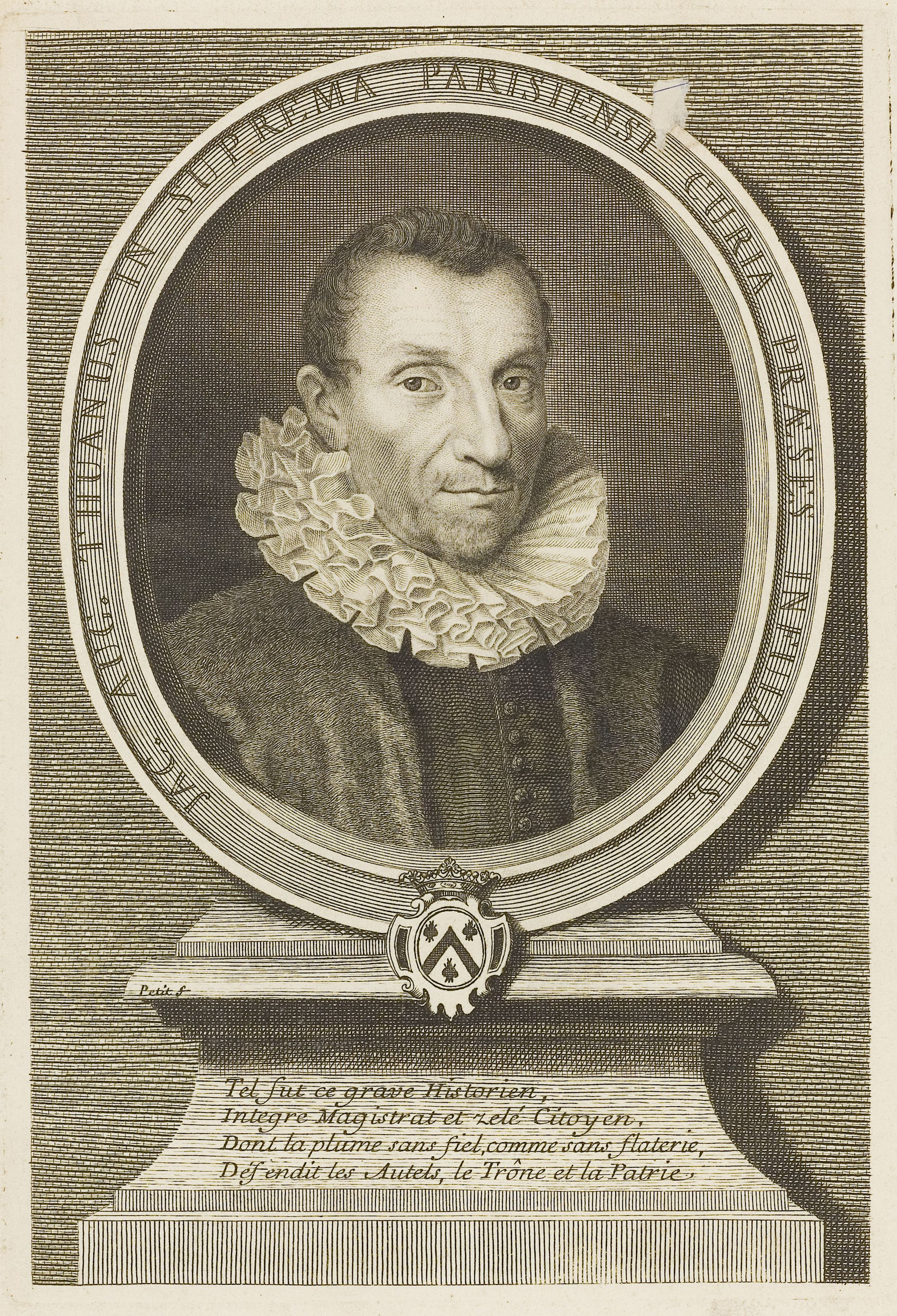
Jacques Auguste de Thou

Jacques Auguste de Thou (sometimes known by the Latin version of his name Thuanus) (8 October 1553, Paris – 7 May 1617, Paris) was a French historian, book collector and president of the Parlement of Paris.

== Life ==
Jacques Auguste de Thou was the grandson of Augustin de Thou, president of the Parlement of Paris (d. 1544), and the third son of Christophe de Thou (d. 1582), premier président of the same parlement, who had had ambitions to produce a history of France. His uncle was Nicolas de Thou, Bishop of Chartres (1573–1598). With this family background, he developed a love of literature, a firm but tolerant piety, and a loyalty to the Crown.

At seventeen, he began his studies in law, first at Orléans, later at Bourges, where he made the acquaintance of François Hotman, and finally at Valence, where he had Jacques Cujas for his teacher and Joseph Justus Scaliger as a friend. He was at first intended for the Church; he received the minor orders, and on the appointment of his uncle Nicolas to the episcopate succeeded him as a canon of Notre-Dame de Paris.

During the next ten years he seized every opportunity for profitable travel. In 1573 he accompanied Paul de Foix on an embassy, which enabled him to visit most of the Italian courts; he formed a friendship with Arnaud d'Ossat (afterwards Bishop of Rennes, bishop of Bayeux and a cardinal), who was secretary to the ambassador. In the following year he formed part of the brilliant cortege which brought King Henry III back to France, after his flight from his Polish kingdom. He also visited several parts of France, and at Bordeaux met Michel de Montaigne. On the death of his elder brother Jean (5 April 1579), who was maître des requêtes to the parlement, his relations prevailed on him to leave the Church, and he entered the parlement and got married (1588). In the same year he was appointed conseiller d'état. He served faithfully both Henry III and Henry IV, because they both represented legitimate authority.

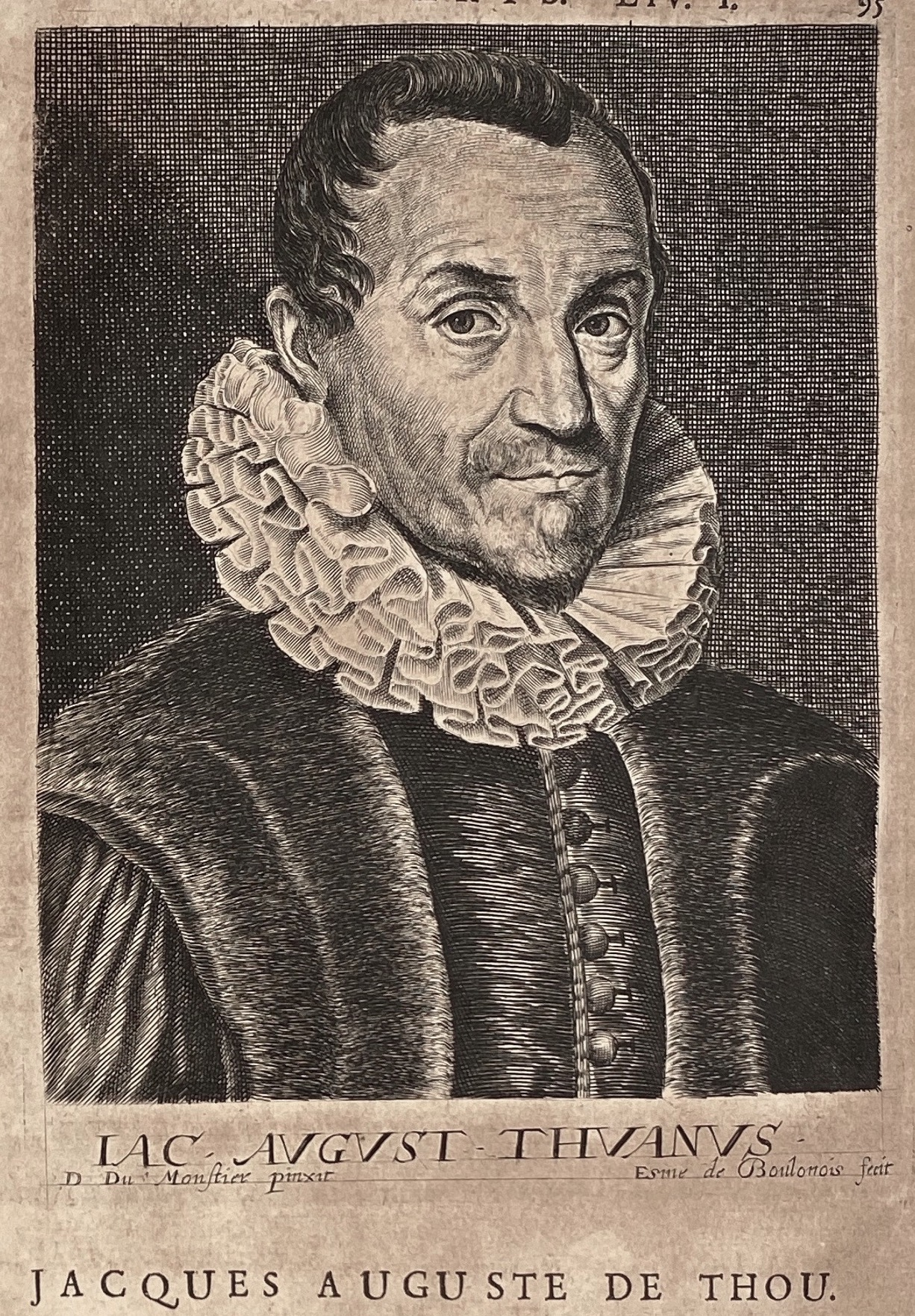
Jacques Auguste de Thou, president of the parliament of Paris

He succeeded his uncle Augustin as président à mortier (1595), and used his authority in the interests of religious peace. He negotiated the Edict of Nantes with the Protestants, while in the name of the principles of the Gallican Church he opposed the recognition of the Council of Trent.

After the death of Henry IV, de Thou had a disappointment; the queen regent, Marie de Medici, refused him the position of premier président of the parlement, appointing him instead as a member of the Conseil des finances intended to take the place of Sully. This was to him a demotion; he continued, however, to serve under her, and took part in the negotiations of the treaties concluded at Ste Menehould (1614) and Loudun (1616). He died in Paris.

=== Personal life ===
De Thou was married twice. His first wife was Marie Barbancon (1547-1601), whom he married in 1587. His second wife was Gasparde de la Chastre, whom he married in 1602. Their son François Auguste de Thou was also a bibliophile. He was executed in 1642 after having been implicated in the rebellious conspiracy of Henri Coiffier de Ruzé, Marquis of Cinq-Mars.

=== Coat of arms ===
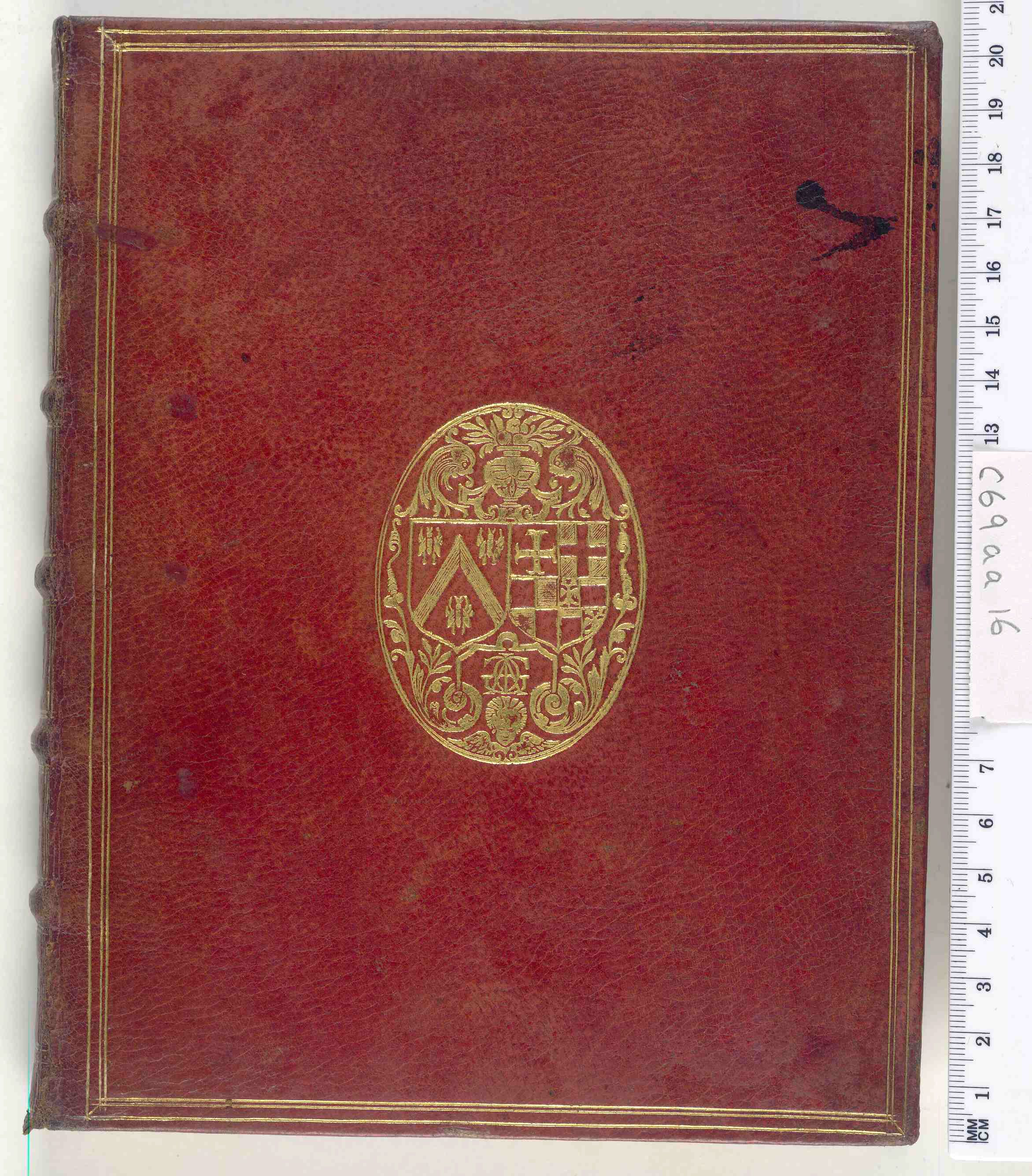
Supralibros with the arms of de Thou and his second wife

Argent, a chevron between three flies sable. The armorial bindings found in his extensive book collection vary in the way his coat of arms is presented. During his marriages he amended the design to include the coat of arms of his wife.

== Works and library ==
His attitude exposed him to the animosity of the League party and of the Holy See, and to their persecution when the first edition of his history appeared. This history was his life's work. In a letter of 31 March 1611, addressed to the president Pierre Jeannin, he described his labours.

His materials were drawn from his rich library, one of the glories of Europe, which he established in the Rue des Poitevins in the year 1587, with the two brothers, Pierre Dupuy and Jacques Dupuy, as librarians. It was one of the finest libraries developed during the Renaissance era.

His object was to produce a scientific and unbiased work, and for this reason he wrote it in Latin, giving it as title Historia sui temporis. The first 18 books, embracing the period from 1545 to 1560, appeared in 1604 (1 vol. folio), and the work was at once attacked by those whom the author himself calls les envieux et les factieux.

The second part, dealing with the first wars of religion (1560–1572) including the St. Bartholomew's Day massacre, was put on the Index Librorum Prohibitorum (9 November 1609). The third part (up to 1574), and the fourth (up to 1584), which appeared in 1607 and 1608, caused a similar outcry, in spite of de Thou's efforts to remain just and impartial. He carried his scruples to the point of forbidding any translation of his book into French, because in the process there might, to use his own words, "be committed great faults and errors against the intention of the author"; this, however, did not prevent the Jesuit Father Machault from accusing him of being "a false Catholic, and worse than an open heretic" (1614); de Thou, we may say, was a member of the third order of St Francis. As an answer to his detractors, he wrote his Mémoires, which are a useful complement to the History of his own Times.

To de Thou we also owe certain other works: a treatise De re accipitraria (1784), a Life, in Latin, of Papyre Masson, poems about plants, some Poemata sacra, etc.

== Editions ==
Three years after the death of de Thou, Pierre Dupuy and Nicolas Rigault brought out the first complete edition of the Historia sui temporis, comprising 138 books; they appended to it the Mémoires, also in Latin (1620). A hundred years later, Samuel Buckley published a critical edition, the material for which had been collected in France itself by Thomas Carte (1733). De Thou was treated as a classic, an honour which he deserved. His history is a model of exact research, drawn from the best sources, and presented in an elegant and animated style; unfortunately, even for the men of the Renaissance, Latin was a dead language; it was impossible for de Thou to find exact equivalents for technical terms of geography or of administration.

As the reasons which had led de Thou to forbid the translation of his monumental history disappeared with his death, there was soon a move to make it more accessible. It was translated first into German. A Protestant pastor, G Boule, who was afterwards converted to Catholicism, translated it into French, but could not find a publisher. The first translation printed was that of Pierre Du Ryer (1657), but it is incomplete.

In the following century the abbé Prévost, who was a conscientious collaborator with the Benedictines of Saint-Maur before he became the author of the more profane work Manon Lescaut, was in treaty with a Dutch publisher for a translation which was to consist of ten volumes; only the first volume appeared (1733). But competition, perhaps of an unfair character, sprang up. A group of translators, who had the good fortune of being able to avail themselves of Buckley's fine edition, succeeded in bringing out all at the same time a translation in sixteen volumes (De Thou, Histoire universelle, Fr. trans. by Charles le Beau, Le Mascrier, the Abbé Des Fontaines, 1734). As to the Mémoires they had already been translated by Le Petit and Des Ifs (1711); in this form they have been reprinted in the collections of Petitot, Michaud and Buchon.

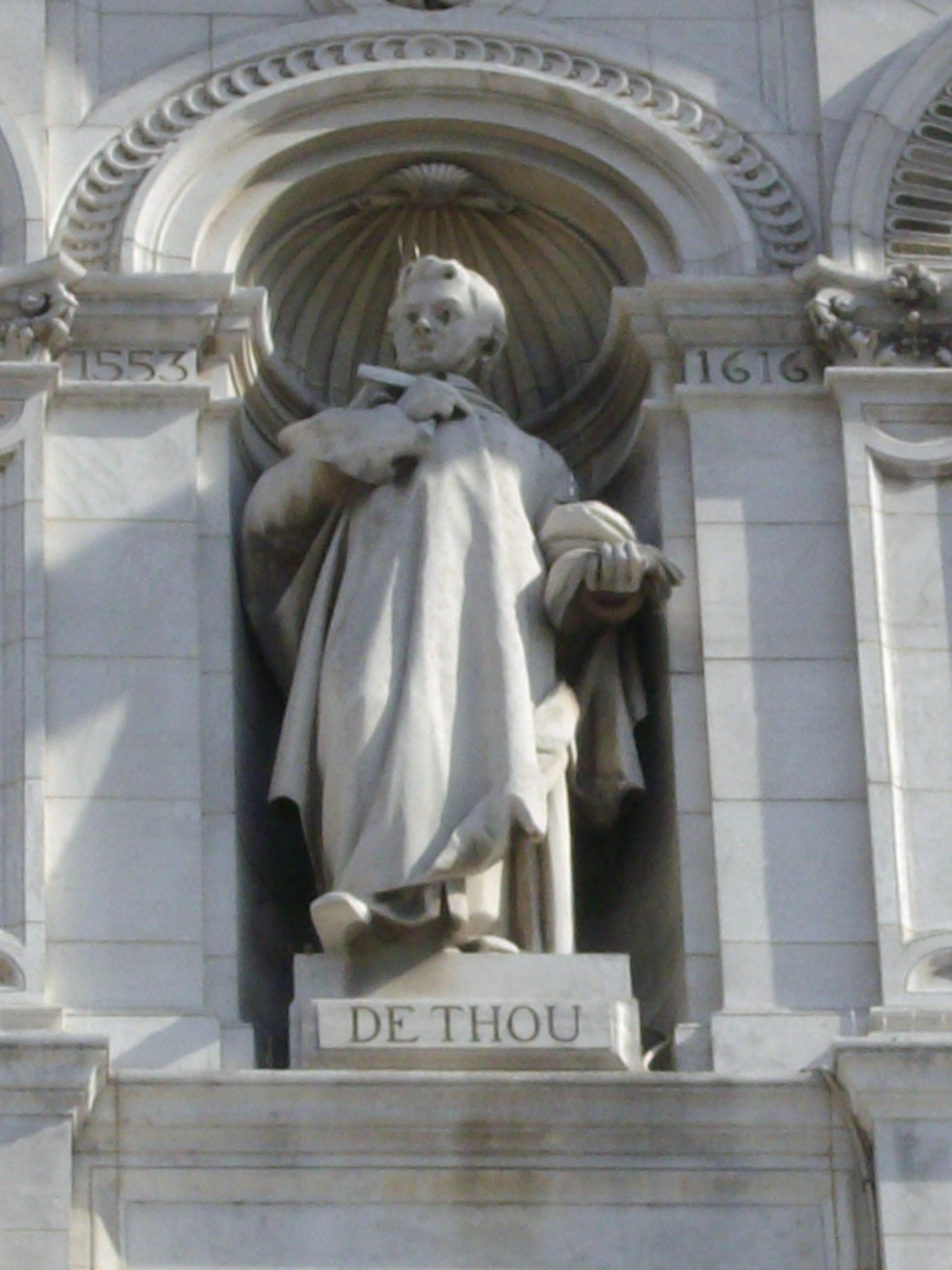
Statue of de Thou by Jean Barnabé Amy on the facade of the Hôtel de Ville, Paris

For his life may be consulted the recollections of him collected by the brothers Dupuy: Thuana, sive Excerpta ex ore J. A. Thuani per F.F.P.P., Paris, 1669 (F.F.P.P.=Fratres Puteanos, i.e. the Dupuy brothers; reprinted in the edition of 1733), and the biographies by J. A. M. Collinson (The Life of Thuanus, London: Longman, Hurst, Rees, and Orme, 1807), and Heinrich Düntzer, (Jacques Auguste de Thou's Leben, Schriften und historische Kunst verglichen mit der der Alten, Darmstadt: Leske, 1837).

See also Henry Harrisse, Le Président de Thou et ses descendants, leur célèbre bibliothèque, leurs armoiries et la traduction française de J. A. Thuani Historiarum sui Temporis (Paris: Librairie H. Leclerc, 1905).

== Bibliography ==
- Goyau, Pierre-Louis-Théophile-Georges (1912). "Jacques-Auguste de Thou" . In Herbermann, Charles (ed.). Catholic Encyclopedia. Vol. 14. New York: Robert Appleton Company.
