= Andronikos Asen Zaccaria =

Prominent noble of the Principality of Achaea

Andronikos Asanes Zaccaria

Grand Constable of the Principality of Achaea
- Reign: 1382-1401
- Predecessor: Centurione I

Baron of Chalandritsa
- Reign: 1382-1401
- Predecessor: Centurione I

Baron of Arcadia
- Reign: 1388-1401
- Predecessor: Erard III

Baron of Estamira
- Reign: 1382-1401
- Predecessor: Centurione I

Lord of Lisarea
- Reign: 1382-1401
- Predecessor: Centurione I

Titular Baron of Damala
- Reign: 1382-1401
- Predecessor: Centurione I
- Died: 1401
- Spouse: Catherine Le Maure
- Issue: Centurione; Erard; Benedict; Stephen
- House: Zaccaria
- Father: Centurione I Zaccaria
- Mother: Asenina
- Religion: Roman Catholic

Andronikos Asen Zaccaria or Asanes Zaccaria (died 1401) was a Genoese lord of the Principality of Achaea in southern Greece.

== Life ==
Andronikos Asen Zaccaria was the son of Centurione I Zaccaria, member of the Genoese Zaccaria dynasty, and of an Asenina, a daughter of the epitropos of Morea Andronikos Asen to whom Andronikos owned his Greek name. She was the sister of Irene Asanina, empress consort of the Byzantine Empire. Through his Asenina mother and her grandmother Irene Palaiologina Andronikos descended from Michael VIII Palaiologos and the imperial prestigious families of Palaiologos, Angelos and Komnenos. On the other hand, Centurione was one of the most powerful lords of the Principality of Achaea, being Grand Constable as well as lord of Damala, Estamira, Chalandritsa and Lisarea.

Andronikos was made a knight before 1375. At this year, he, along with his brother Martino and other young men of the Principality fought the despotate of Morea in the Battle of Gardiki. Impetuous by nature, the young knights led a charge against the Byzantine lines, defeating the Despot Manuel Kantakouzenos and forcing him to retire. Later Centurione was part of a Morean embassy sent to the Kingdom of Naples and precisely to Queen Joanna I and during his absence from Achaea Andronikos acted as a Bailee of the Principality for a short time. Sometime around 1382, Centurione died and Andronikos Asen Zaccaria inherited the Barony of Chalandritsa and the title of Grand Constable of Achaea. He married Catherine Le Maure, a daughter of Erard III Le Maure, Baron of Arcadia with the marriage following the Greek Orthodox rite. When Erard died in 1388 without a male heir (his sole son having died young), Asen Zaccaria added Arcadia to his possessions.

The coming of the Navarrese Company in Morea was opposed by many natives, however, the Zaccarias under Andronikos allied with the new power, and his sister Maria Zaccaria was married to vicar-general of the Navarrese Company and later Prince of Achaea (1396–1402) Peter of Saint Superan. That way Andronikos occupied a pre-eminent position within the Principality, on par only with the Latin Archbishop of Patras.

In 1387 Superan renewed a treaty of friendly relations with Venice after he consulted a court of lords of the Principality, among them was Andronikos as Baron of Chalandritsa and Grand Constable. On 10 September 1389, Andronikos imprisoned Nerio Acciaioli at the castle of Listraina that was close to the contemporary village of Graika near Vostitsa. Listraina was under the control of Andronikos and also a remote and obscure fortress, suitable for the confinement of a high hostage. The Navarrese demanded from Nerio the return of the city of Argos to Venice. Nerio urged that his son-in-law Theodore Palaiologos had conquered Argos without his consent and pledged that he would try to convince him to pass it back to the Venetian Republic.

On 22 May 1390, all parties agreed and Nerio was set free under some harsh conditions. Andronikos was one of the main negotiators in these talks representing the principality of Achaea. Andronikos was also one of the lords of the principality who was present on 11 December 1390 in a council in the castle of Androusa that welcomed the ambassadors of Amadeus of Savoy and discussed with them the ambition of Amadeus to be recognized as Prince of Achaea. On 4 June 1395, together with Saint Superan, he was defeated and captured by the Byzantine Greeks of the Despotate of the Morea, but was released in December, after the Venetians paid a ransom of 50,000 hyperpyra for him and Saint Superan. In 1396, he received a letter from Pope Boniface IX, which extended papal protection over him and urged him to vigorously fight against the growing menace of the Ottoman Turks.

Andronikos Asen Zaccaria died in 1401 and was succeeded by the eldest of his four sons, Centurione II Zaccaria, who in 1404 became Prince of Achaea, reigning until deposed by the Despotate of the Morea in 1430.

== Family ==
From his marriage to Catherine Le Maure, Andronikos Asen had at least four sons:

1. Centurione II Zaccaria (died 1432): Baron of Chalandritsa, later he became Prince of Achaea (1404-1430) after being confirmed by King Ladislaus of Naples as such.
2. Erard IV Zaccaria: succeeded his father as Baron of Arcadia. He died on 1404 and Arcadia was inherited by his elder brother Centurione.
3. Benedict Zaccaria: little are known about Benedict. On 1418 he defended Glarentza against the men of Olivier Franco and was imprisoned after Franco stormed the city.
4. Stephen Zaccaria (died 1424): Latin Archbishop of Patras 1404–1424

== Sources ==
- Bon, Antoine (1969). La Morée franque. Recherches historiques, topographiques et archéologiques sur la principauté d'Achaïe [The Frankish Morea. Historical, Topographic and Archaeological Studies on the Principality of Achaea] (in French). Paris: De Boccard. OCLC 869621129.
- Topping, Peter (1975). "The Morea, 1364–1460". In Setton, Kenneth M.; Hazard, Harry W. (eds.). A History of the Crusades, Volume III: The Fourteenth and Fifteenth Centuries. Vol. 3. Madison and London: University of Wisconsin Press. pp. 141–166. ISBN 0-299-06670-3.

| Preceded by Centurione I Zaccaria | Baron of Chalandritsa before 1386–1401 | Succeeded by Centurione II Zaccaria |
| Preceded by Erard III Le Maure | Baron of Arcadia; 1388–1401 | Succeeded by Centurione II Zaccaria |
