= Siege of Gardiki-Arcadia =

Coordinates: 37.2629°N 22.0584°E

- Part of the Ottoman conquest of the Morea
- The lands ruled by Demetrios Palaiologos and Thomas Palaiologos (the location of Gardiki is indicated).
Date	1460
Location	Gardiki Castle, Arcadia, Greece
Result	Ottoman victory

Belligerents
Ottoman Empire	Byzantine Empire; Republic of Venice

Commanders and leaders
Mehmed the Conqueror; Mahmud Angelović	Manuel Bochalis (surrendered); Georgios Paleologos (surrendered)

Strength
Unknown	1,300 guardian

Casualties and losses
Light	1,300 soldier killed 6,000 civilians killed 10,000 prisoner (From other regions of Arcadia)

The Siege of Gardiki-Arcadia was the fall of a fortress besieged by the Ottoman army under the command of Mehmed II in the Peloponnese in 1460. The castle surrendered after a one-day siege. It was the largest and most formidable castle in the region.

== Campaign ==
In May 1460, amid unrest in the Morea, Mehmed personally set out on campaign to restore order. After a march lasting twenty-seven days, Mehmed reached Gördüs from Edirne. After capturing Demetrios at Mystras, the sultan advanced against the fortresses held by Thomas.

== Siege ==
After this, Mehmed II entered the region of Arcadia. The fortresses there were receiving constant support from the Venetians and attempted to maintain their defense.

The local population and inhabitants had taken refuge in the fortress of Gardiki, which they believed to be impregnable.

This fortress was situated on a very high hill near the entrance of the mountain called Zygos of Sparta, surrounded by sheer cliffs and a deep river running nearby, making its capture impossible. There was only a single entrance to the fortress. Although Mehmed offered the fortress the option of surrender, the inhabitants refused. Since taking the fortress by force would have resulted in heavy losses, it was subjected to starvation and thirst.

The garrison of the city, suffering greatly from hunger and thirst, eventually inclined toward surrender. Although the fortress of Gardiki delayed its surrender by one day, it nevertheless could not escape the sultan's wrath.

In Gardiki, Mehmed ordered the execution of 1,300 Greek soldiers who had violated the terms of surrender. He also gathered 6,000 civilians into a confined area, chained their hands and feet, and had them tortured to death. This time, those killed included women and children. The fortress commander, Manuel Bochalis, was spared through the intervention of his wife Eugenia (the sister of Angelović) via Mahmud Pasha. Manuel Bochalis and Georgios Palaiologos withdrew freely to Corfu, and from there they went to Naples.

== Terror ==
The massacre at Gardiki spread terror in the Morea, and the governors of the other castles surrendered themselves to the sultan. Mehmed II assembled some 10,000 inhabitants from these castles and sent them to the suburbs of Constantinople.
