= Geoffrey of Aulnay =

Geoffrey of Aulnay was Baron of Arcadia in the Principality of Achaea in the late 13th century.

Geoffrey was a son of the first Baron of Arcadia, Vilain I of Aulnay. When Vilain died c. 1269, his lands were divided among his two sons, Geoffrey and Erard I.

Erard was taken prisoner by the Byzantines during the skirmishes between Achaea and the Byzantine province in the southeastern Morea, sometime around 1279, and likely died in captivity. Disregarding the provisions of Erard's will, the Angevin baillis sequestered the lands, and it was not until 1293 that Geoffrey managed to recover Erard's half of the barony.

In 1292 or 1293, Geoffrey went on a diplomatic mission to the Byzantine court in Constantinople along with John Chauderon, in order to obtain the recovery of the fortress of Kalamata, which had shortly before been seized by local Slavs and handed over to the Byzantine governor of Mystras. The embassy succeeded in obtaining a verbal promise only thanks to the intercession of the Angevin ambassador to Constantinople; the Byzantine emperor even insisted that the castle be handed over to Geoffrey, rather than the Prince of Achaea. At the same time, the emperor also sent orders to his local governor to refuse to hand the castle over. In the event, Kalamata was surrendered to the Achaeans due to the intervention of a local Greek magnate, Sgouromallis.

Geoffrey had a son, Vilain II, who married Helena, a daughter of Geoffrey II of Briel and lady of Moraina and Lisarea. Geoffrey died sometime after 1297, and was succeeded by his son.

== Sources ==
- Bon, Antoine (1969). La Morée franque. Recherches historiques, topographiques et archéologiques sur la principauté d'Achaïe [The Frankish Morea. Historical, Topographic and Archaeological Studies on the Principality of Achaea] (in French). Paris: De Boccard. OCLC 869621129.

Preceded by Vilain I of Aulnay	Baron of Arcadia c. 1269–after 1297; With: Erard I of Aulnay (until c. 1279)	Succeeded by Vilain II of Aulnay
