= Margaret, Lady of Lisarea =

Margaret, Lady of Lisarea was lady of the fief of Lisarea in the Principality of Achaea, around 1276.

Her identity is obscure, as very little is known about her. The 19th-century German medievalist Karl Hopf proposed a reconstructed genealogy, whereby she was the daughter of Guibert of Cors and Margaret of Nully, along with a hypothetical brother, William. Hopf further proposed that she married first Payen of Stenay, who is attested as selling a part of the Cors lands in 1280, and then, in 1287–89, as her second husband, Geoffrey II of Briel.

The French scholar Antoine Bon, however, rejected Hopf's hypothesis, pointing out that many assumptions rested on pure conjecture: the only certain facts, according to Bon, are that in 1276, Margaret held the fief of Lisarea, that she was a cousin of Walter of Rosières, and that she married Geoffrey II, with whom she had a daughter.

== Sources ==
- Bon, Antoine (1969). La Morée franque. Recherches historiques, topographiques et archéologiques sur la principauté d'Achaïe (in French). Paris: De Boccard.
