= Barthélemy Prieur =

French artist

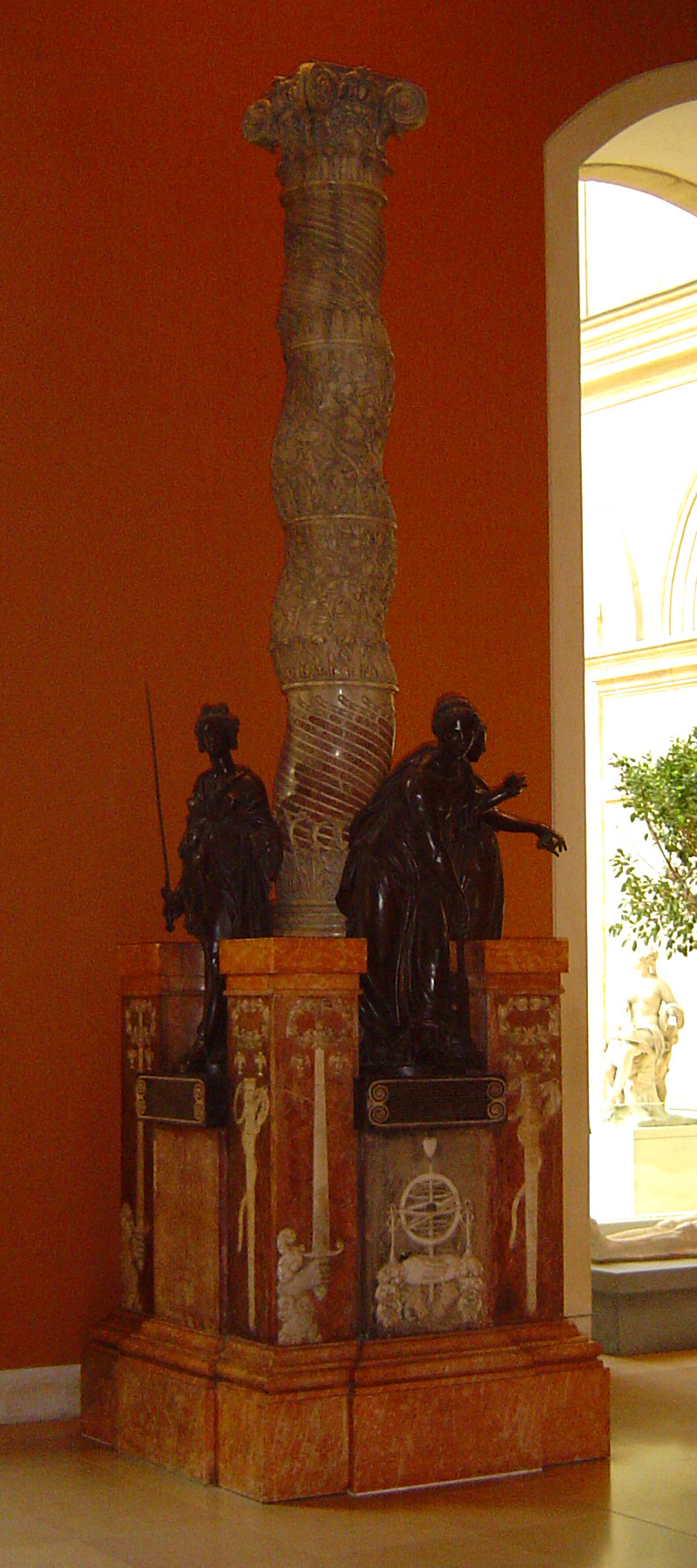
Monument to the heart of Anne de Montmorency

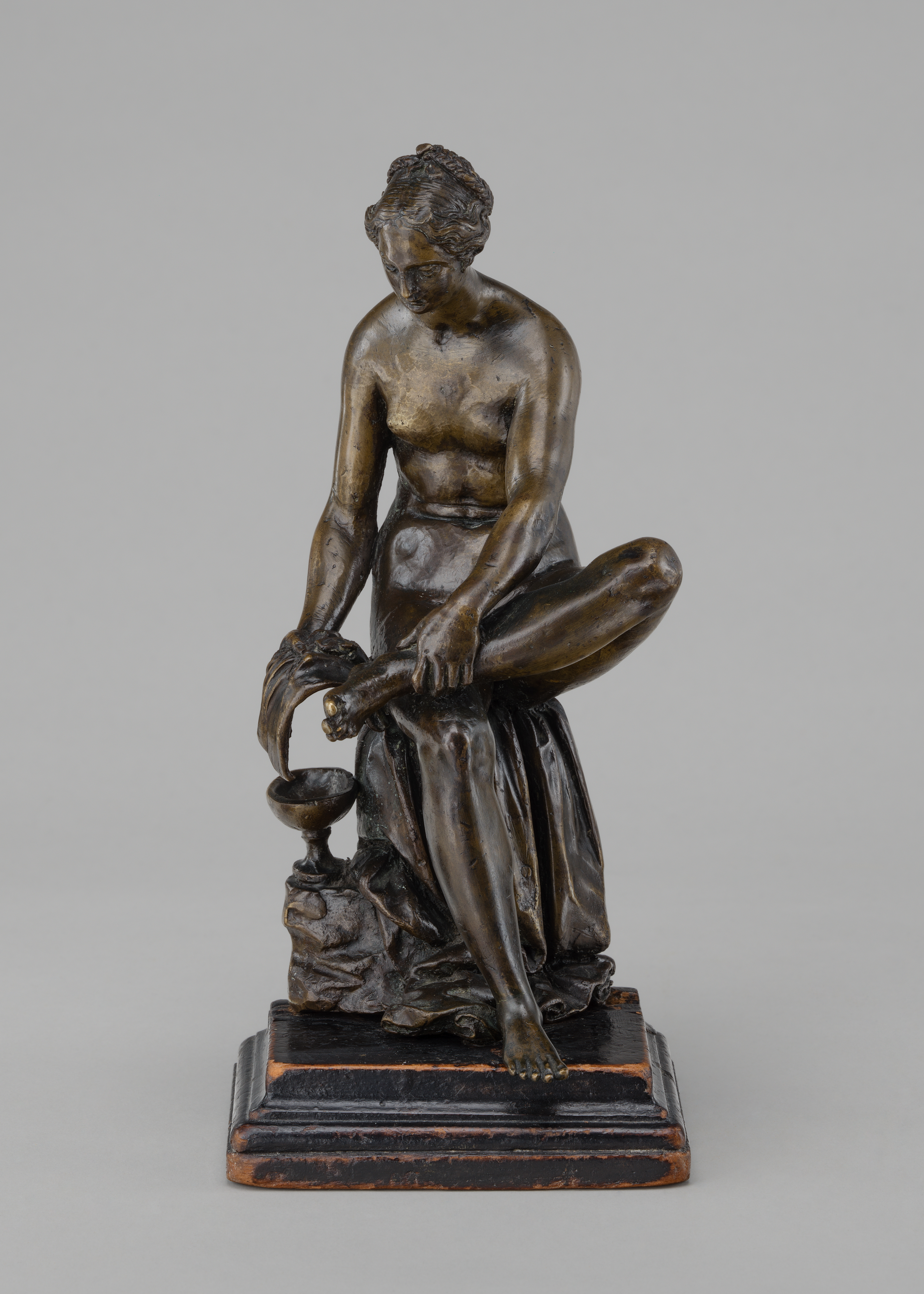
Barthélemy Prieur, Woman Bathing Her Foot. Bronze, early 17th century.

Barthélemy Prieur (c. 1536–1611) was a French sculptor.

Prieur was born to a Huguenot family in Berzieux, Champagne (now in the department of the Marne). He traveled to Italy, where he worked from 1564 to 1568 for Emmanuel Philibert, Duke of Savoy in Turin. Upon his return to France, he worked principally on funerary monuments and busts, but also on small bronzes.

In 1571, he began employment under Jean Bullant at the Palais du Louvre, where he was a contemporary of Germain Pilon. In 1585, he created the monument to Christophe de Thou, now preserved in the Louvre Museum, and was named sculptor to king Henry IV in 1591. He restored the Roman marble now called the Diana of Versailles in 1602.

Several of his bronzes are preserved in the National Gallery of Art, Washington, DC, including Gladiator, Lion Devouring a Doe, Seated Woman Pulling a Thorn from Her Heel, and Small Horse. His bronze busts of King Henry IV and the king's wife Marie de' Medici (c.1600) are now in the Ashmolean Museum. His Monument du coeur du connétable Anne de Montmorency is on display in the Louvre.
