= Erard I of Aulnay =

Erard I of Aulnay was lord of one half of the Barony of Arcadia in the Principality of Achaea.

Erard was a son of the first Baron of Arcadia, Vilain I of Aulnay. When Vilain died c. 1269, his lands were divided among his two sons, Erard and Geoffrey.

Like other Achaean nobles, Erard spent time at the court of the suzerain of the Principality, Charles I of Naples, who used them as councillors and go-betweens on affairs concerning the Principality. In 1269, he led an embassy to Venice on behalf of Charles, hoping to persuade the Venetians to abandon their recently concluded truce with the Byzantines, but to no avail.

Erard was taken prisoner by the Byzantines during the skirmishes between Achaea and the Byzantine province in the southeastern Morea, sometime around 1279. He disappears from the sources thereafter, and is not mentioned as among those released in subsequent prisoner exchanges, meaning that he likely died in captivity. Erard had appointed John Chauderon and Peter of Vaux as administrators of his domains, but, disregarding his will, the Angevin baillis sequestered the lands, and it was not until 1293 that his brother, Geoffrey, managed to recover Erard's half of the barony.

== Sources ==
- Bon, Antoine (1969). La Morée franque. Recherches historiques, topographiques et archéologiques sur la principauté d'Achaïe [The Frankish Morea. Historical, Topographic and Archaeological Studies on the Principality of Achaea] (in French). Paris: De Boccard. OCLC 869621129.

Preceded by Vilain I of Aulnay	Baron of Arcadia c. 1269–1279; With: Geoffrey of Aulnay	Succeeded by Geoffrey of Aulnay
