= John Laskaris Kalopheros =

Byzantine aristocrat

John Laskaris Kalopheros (1325/30–1392) was a wealthy Byzantine aristocrat who converted to Catholicism and served as an advisor and diplomat to the Kingdom of Cyprus, the Papacy and the Republic of Venice. He played a prominent role in negotiations to end to the East–West schism of the churches and launch a general crusade against the Ottoman Turks.

He was married three times: first before 1363 to Maria Kantakouzene, a daughter of the Emperor Matthew Kantakouzenos; second around 1367 to Maria de Mimars, a Cypriot noblewoman; and third in 1372 or 1373 to Lucie, noblewoman of Frankish Greece.

== Family ==
Kalopheros was born between 1325 and 1330. It is unclear how he was related to the Laskaris family, but there is no reason to doubt that he was. He had a brother named Maximos, who was the protosynkellos of the Patriarchate of Constantinople in 1365 and the hegoumenos of the monastery of Diomedes in 1374. Like his brother, Maximos supported the union of the churches. They had a sister, Eudoxia, who married Andronikos Agallon.

Kalopheros was a friend and correspondent of Demetrios Kydones.

== Life ==
=== Byzantine period ===
Kalapheros supported the Palaiologos emperor John V against the Kantakouzenos candidate, John VI, during the Byzantine civil war of 1341–1347. Afterwards, influenced by the preaching of Pierre de Thomas, he converted from Orthodoxy to Catholicism. When he secretly married Maria Kantakouzene, a daughter of Matthew Kantakouzenos, John V forced him into exile in 1362 or 1363. The reasons for the emperor's opposition to this marriage appear to be the threat that a man of Kalopheros' wealth and imperial pedigree posed when allied to a powerful family with a history of opposing the Palaiologoi.

Kalopheros wealth came from land and trade. His wealth was considered great enough to bankroll an imperial candidate. Even during his exile, however, his Byzantine estates were not confiscated. He had commercial connections as far afield as Egypt, Aragon and Castile.

=== Service of Peter I ===
In exile, Kalapheros visited the court of Pope Urban V, who, on 18 April 1365, sent reference letters on his behalf to John V, King Peter I of Cyprus, the doges Lorenzo Celsi of Venice and Gabriele Adorno of Genoa and the Grand Master of the Knights Hospitaller. Later that year, he moved to Cyprus and entered the service of Peter I. With a knight of Thessaloniki named Demetrios Angelos, a fellow convert and companion in exile, he took part in the Alexandrian Crusade in 1365. Kydones' letters record that he became one of Peter's financiers and advisors on military matters. He was one of the foreigners favoured by Peter with fiefs and annuities. In return, according to Kydones, he paid off some of the debts Peter had contracted during his tour of Europe. Some of his wealth may have derived from the booty of Alexandria. He took part in three campaigns in 1367: Peter's raid on Tripoli, Prince John of Lusignan's relief of besieged Corycus and the suppression of a rebellion at Adalia.

Around 1367, his first wife having died, he married Maria de Mimars, widow of the Cypriot bailli Jean de Soissons. He thereby became the brother-in-law of Margaret of Soissons, Queen of Armenia. He paid the spectacular brideprice of 243,567 Cypriot bezants and received the usufruct of Maria's Cypriot estates. The marriage was short. Maria died in 1369 or 1370.

=== Avignon, Italy and Cyprus ===
After Peter's assassination in 1369, Kalopheros was persecuted by the regime of John of Lusignan. In 1370, accused of having conspired with Eleanor, mother of the young king Peter II, he was arrested. The estates of his wife, which he had unlawfully retained, were confiscated. Freed in 1371 or 1372, he left Cyprus to serve the Papacy in Avignon.

In 1372 or 1373, Kalopheros contracted his third marriage to Lucie, daughter of Erard III, baron of Arcadia in Greece. He was in Cyprus in February 1373, when Queen Eleanor entrusted him with a message for her father, Peter of Ribagorza, then resident at Avignon. On 22 March, Pope Gregory XI sent him on a diplomatic mission to the Kingdom of Naples in an effort to coordinate a naval league against the Ottoman Turks. At the end of June, the pope sent him to the Republic of Genoa to fend off an impending Genoese invasion of Cyprus and to convince the Genoese to concentrate their efforts against the Turks. Kalopheros continued to work for the union of the churches as late as 1374.

In 1379, Kalopheros visited Rhodes. He supported the efforts of James of Baux to realize his claims to the Latin Empire. In 1382 or 1838, at the height of his war against the Navarrese Company, James granted Kalopheros the county of Cephalonia. In 1388, Kalopheros became a citizen of Venice, having already received citizenship from Genoa. He had his will drawn up at Venice on 5 July 1388 by the notary Marco de Rafanelli. Soon afterwards, he returned to Cyprus.

Kalopheros died on the island in 1392, before 2 September, when news of his death reached the Principality of Morea. His heir was Erard Laskaris, his son by Lucie. The executor of his will was his nephew, Erardo Zaccaria, the son of Lucie's sister Catherine and Andronikos Asen Zaccaria. He left legacies for Jeannot de Soissons, the son of his stepson by his first wife, and to a daughter of his stepdaughter Alise by the same.

== Bibliography ==
- Boehlke, Jr., Frederick J. (1966). Pierre de Thomas: Scholar, Diplomat, and Crusader. University of Pennsylvania Press. ISBN 9781512800425.
- Coureas, Nicholas (2018). "The Perception and Evaluation of Foreign Soldiers in the Wars of King Peter I of Cyprus: The Evidence of the Cypriot Chronicles and Its Shortcomings". The Medieval Chronicle. 11: 108–126.
- Edbury, Peter W. (1994). Kingdom of Cyprus and the Crusades. Cambridge University Press.
- Eszer, Ambrosius K. (1969). Das abenteuerliche Leben des Johannes Laskaris Kalopheros: Forschungen zur Geschichte der ost-westlichen Beziehungen im 14. Jahrhundert. Harrassowitz.
- Iorga, Nicolae (1896). Philippe de Mézières (1327–1405) et la croisade au XIV^{e} siècle. Émile Bouillon.
- Jacoby, David (1968). "Jean Lascaris Calophéros, Chypre et la Morée". Revue des études byzantines. 26: 189–228. doi:10.3406/rebyz.1968.1406.
- Jacoby, David (1971). "Review of Eszer 1969". Byzantinische Zeitschrift. 64 (2): 378–381.
- Kazhdan, Alexander (1991). "Kalopheros, John Laskaris". In Kazhdan, Alexander (ed.). The Oxford Dictionary of Byzantium. Oxford and New York: Oxford University Press. ISBN 0-19-504652-8.
- Krekić, Bariša (1974). "Prilog biografiji Johannes-a Laskaris-a Kalopheros-a". Zbornik Filozofskog fakulteta u Beogradu. 12 (1): 405–414.
- Loenertz, Raymond-Joseph (1970). "Pour la biographie de Jean Lascaris Calophéros (à propos de deux publications récentes)". Revue des études byzantines. 28: 129–139. doi:10.3406/rebyz.1970.1431.
- Ryder, Judith R. (2010). The Career and Writings of Demetrius Kydones: A Study of Fourteenth-Century Byzantine Politics, Religion and Society. Brill.
- Salzmann, Miriam Rachel (2021). Negotiating Power and Identities Latin, Greek and Syrian Élites in Fifteenth-Century Cyprus (PDF). Verlag des Römisch-Germanischen Zentralmuseums.
- Thibault, Paul R. (1986). Pope Gregory XI: The Failure of Tradition. University Press of America.
- Zečević, Nada (2016). The Tocco of the Greek Realm: Nobility, Power and Migration in Latin Greece (14th–15th Centuries). Makart.
