= Jacqueline de la Roche =

Jacqueline de la Roche (died after 1329), was sovereign baroness of Veligosti and Damala in 1308–1329, from 1311 in co-regency with her spouse.

== Life ==
She was the daughter and heiress of Renaud de la Roche, and as such the last heiress of the de la Roche family which had ruled the Duchy of Athens from 1204 to 1308.

She married Martino Zaccaria, Lord of Chios in 1311, who became her co-regent.

When Martino was captured and carted off to Constantinople by Andronicus III Palaeologus in 1329, Jacqueline was allowed to go free with her children "and all they could carry." She was the mother of Bartolommeo, Margrave of Bodonitsa, and of Centurione I.

== Sources ==
- Miller, William. "The Zaccaria of Phocaea and Chios (1275-1329)." The Journal of Hellenic Studies, Vol. 31. (1911), pp. 42–55.
- Setton, Kenneth M.; Hazard, Harry W., eds. (1975). A History of the Crusades, Volume III: The Fourteenth and Fifteenth Centuries. Madison and London: University of Wisconsin Press. ISBN 0-299-06670-3.
- Setton, Kenneth M. Catalan Domination of Athens 1311–1380. Revised edition. Variorum: London, 1975.
