= De la Roche family =

French noble family

de la Roche
- de la Roche family coat of arms
- Etymology: "of the Rock" in French in reference to the place of origin
- Origin: La Roche-sur-l'Ognon, Duchy of Athens, Fourth Crusade
- Members: Othon de la Roche (founder)
- Distinctions: Dukes (European nobility)

The de la Roche family was a French noble family named for La Roche-sur-l'Ognon in Burgundy, France that founded the Duchy of Athens 1204 and held it for just over a century.

== Notable members ==
- Alice de la Roche (unknown-1282), Lady of Beirut, Regent of Beirut
- Guy I de la Roche (1205–1263), Frankish Duke of Athens
- Guy II de la Roche (1280–1308), Frankish Duke of Athens
- Isabella de la Roche, (died c.1291), daughter of Guy I de la Roche and wife of Geoffrey of Briel
- Jacqueline de la Roche (died c.1329) baroness of Veligosti and Damala in 1308–1329, from 1311 in co-regency with her spouse.
- James de la Roche, Baron of Veligosti and Damala, son of William de la Roche (lord of Veligosti)
- John I de la Roche (died 1280) Frankish Duke of Athens, succeeding his father; Guy I de la Roche
- Othon de la Roche (died c.1234), first Frankish Lord and Duke of Athens
- Renaud de la Roche, father of Jacqueline de la Roche, son of James
- William de la Roche (lord of Veligosti), Baron of Veligosti and Damala in the Principality of Achaea, and a relative of the ruling Dukes of Athens of the de la Roche family.
- William I de la Roche (died 1287) succeeded his brother, John I de la Roche, as Duke of Athens in 1280.

== Coat of arms ==
The la Roche family bears for arms: five points gules equipolated to four or.

== Bibliography ==
- James Rennell Rodd, The Princes of Achaia and the Chronicles of Morea: A Study of Greece in the Middle Ages, 1907, v. II, p. 314, "The De La Roches of Athens", —considered outdated
