= Battle of Gardiki =

1370s battle

Battle of Geraki
- Part of the Byzantine-Latin Wars
- Map of the Peloponnese (Morea) in the Middle Ages.
Date	c. 1375
Location	Gardiki Castle, Arcadia, Greece
Result	Achaean victory in battle; failure of the siege

Belligerents
Despotate of the Morea	Principality of Achaea

Commanders and leaders
Manuel Kantakouzenos	Francis of San Severino

Strength
1,000 cavalry, 2,000 infantry	300 cavalry, 600 infantry

The Battle of Geraki took place in c. 1375 between the Latin Principality of Achaea and the Byzantine Greek Despotate of the Morea, at the fortress of Gardiki in Arcadia, southern Greece.

In 1374, Francis of San Severino was sent as the new bailli (viceroy) by the Angevin Queen of Naples, Joan, to take control over the Principality of Achaea. According to the Aragonese version of the Chronicle of the Morea, he attacked the Byzantine possessions, and laid siege to Gardiki. The Byzantine Despot of the Morea, Manuel Kantakouzenos, came to the castle's aid with a thousand cavalry and two thousand infantry. The Achaean army was considerably smaller, numbering 300 horse and 600 foot soldiers. Among its ranks, however, were a number of young men who had just been raised to knighthood—the Chronicle gives their names as Jorge and Vasili Galentini, Johan Alaman, Galiani de Baliano, and Asan and Martino, sons of the grand constable of Achaea Centurione I Zaccaria. Impetuous by nature, they led a charge against the Byzantine lines, defeating the Despot and forcing him to retire. The castle however continued to resist, and San Severino in turn was forced to raise the siege.

== Sources ==
- Bon, Antoine (1969). La Morée franque. Recherches historiques, topographiques et archéologiques sur la principauté d'Achaïe [The Frankish Morea. Historical, Topographic and Archaeological Studies on the Principality of Achaea] (in French). Paris: De Boccard.
