= Geoffrey Chauderon =

Geoffrey Chauderon (died 1278) was the first Baron of Estamira and Grand Constable of the Principality of Achaea, in Frankish Greece.

Geoffrey Chauderon was probably from Champagne. He likely settled in the Principality of Achaea sometime after 1230, and was awarded the extensive Barony of Estamira, comprising twelve fiefs. According to the Aragonese version of the Chronicle of the Morea, he was also the Grand Constable of Achaea.

He died in 1278, shortly after Prince William of Villehardouin. He was succeeded by his son John. The existence of a daughter is also attested, as she served as hostage in Constantinople, where she later married.

== Sources ==
- Bon, Antoine (1969). La Morée franque. Recherches historiques, topographiques et archéologiques sur la principauté d'Achaïe [The Frankish Morea. Historical, Topographic and Archaeological Studies on the Principality of Achaea] (in French). Paris: De Boccard. OCLC 869621129.
