= William de la Roche (lord of Veligosti) =

Greek nobleman

William de la Roche was a Baron of Veligosti and Damala in the Principality of Achaea, and a relative of the ruling Dukes of Athens of the de la Roche family.

== Life ==
William's exact parentage and position within the de la Roche family is unknown. The 19th-century scholar of Frankish Greece, Karl Hopf, proposed that he was a brother of the second Duke of Athens, Guy I de la Roche, who at the time was supposed to be the nephew of the duchy's founder, Otto de la Roche. More recent research has established that Guy was in fact Otto's son, leaving William's identity open to question. He may indeed have been a son of Ponce de la Roche, Otto's brother, who was once believed to have been Guy's father, or alternatively a son of Otto like Guy, or a descendant of another branch of the family altogether.

Whatever his origin, William by 1256 became the lord of the Barony of Veligosti (Miser Guglielmo de Villegorde in Marino Sanudo's history) in the Principality of Achaea. The exact manner of his acquisition of this fief is unknown. The barony originally belonged to the Mons family, but was probably ceded to William after Matthew of Mons married a Byzantine princess and left the principality. Hopf hypothesized that William may have married a sister of Matthew of Mons. William also held the region of Damala in the Argolid as a fief—apparently detached from the lordship of Argos and Nauplia, which was held by Guy—and the two domains of Damala and Veligosti became united under the same title.

In 1257–58 he became involved in the War of the Euboeote Succession, siding with the Lombard triarchs of Euboea and the Republic of Venice against his suzerain, Prince William II of Villehardouin. As he was likely to lose his domain as a result of this act of rebellion, he was promised by the Venetians territory in the value of 1,000 hyperpyra in compensation. In the event, despite William II's victory in the war, he was pardoned and allowed to retain his barony in the peace treaty of 1262.

William was succeeded by James de la Roche, evidently his son, while in the early 14th century, Renaud "de Véligourt", son of James and Maria Aleman, daughter of the Baron of Patras William Aleman, is mentioned as "lord of Damala" (sires de Damalet), after the family had lost Veligosti (Véligourt in French) to the Byzantines.

== Sources ==
- Bon, Antoine (1969). La Morée franque. Recherches historiques, topographiques et archéologiques sur la principauté d'Achaïe [The Frankish Morea. Historical, Topographic and Archaeological Studies on the Principality of Achaea] (in French). Paris: De Boccard. OCLC 869621129.
- Longnon, Jean (1973). "Les premiers ducs d'Athènes et leur famille". Journal des Savants (in French) (1): 61–80. ISSN 1775-383X.

Preceded by Matthew of Mons	Baron of Veligosti by 1256 – after 1262	Succeeded by James de la Roche
