= Vilain II of Aulnay =

Baron of Arcadia

Vilain II of Aulnay was Baron of Arcadia in the Principality of Achaea in the early 14th century.

Vilain II was a son of Geoffrey of Aulnay and grandson of the first Baron of Arcadia, Vilain I of Aulnay.

Vilain II married Helena, a daughter of Geoffrey II of Briel and lady of Moraina and Lisarea. Vilain's father died sometime after 1297, whereupon Vilain became Baron of Arcadia. Vilain had two children, Erard II and Agnes. When Vilain died, at some unknown point, the barony was divided between them, and not reunited until Erard III Le Maure in the 1340s.

== Sources ==
- Bon, Antoine (1969). La Morée franque. Recherches historiques, topographiques et archéologiques sur la principauté d'Achaïe [The Frankish Morea. Historical, Topographic and Archaeological Studies on the Principality of Achaea] (in French). Paris: De Boccard. OCLC 869621129.

Preceded by Geoffrey of Aulnay	Baron of Arcadia after 1297–unknown	Succeeded by Erard II of Aulnay and Agnes of Aulnay
