= Robert of Dramelay =

French Baron

Robert of Dramelay (French: Robert de Dramelay; died before 1280) was the second Baron of Chalandritsa in the Principality of Achaea in Frankish Greece from ca. 1230 until his death, some time before 1280.

He was succeeded by his son Guy II of Dramelay.
