= Nicolas de Thou =

French prelate of the Catholic Church (1528–1598)

- Bishop of Chartres
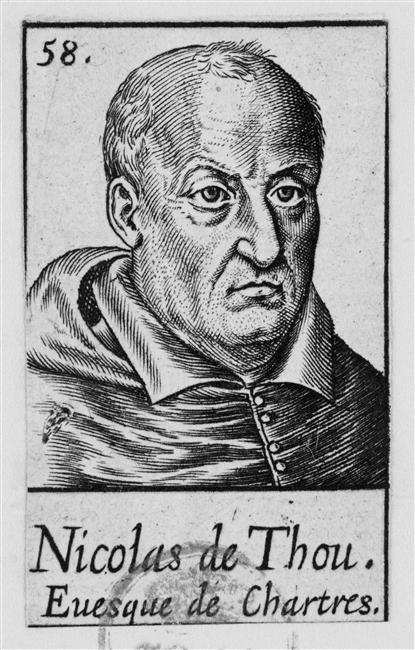
- Church: Catholic
- Diocese: Chartres
- Appointed: 8 April 1573
- Other post(s): Canon of the Cathedral of Paris

Orders
- Consecration: 29 Jun 1573 by Charles de Guise de Lorraine

Personal details
- Born: 1528; Paris, France
- Died: 5 November 1598 (aged 70); Villebon-sur-Yvette, France
- Father: Augustin de Thou
- Relatives: Christophe de Thou (brother); Jacques-Auguste de Thou (nephew)

Nicolas de Thou (1528 – 5 November 1598) was a French prelate of the Catholic Church. He was a cleric, Bishop of Chartres, and, in politics, a figure instrumental in the coronation of Henry IV of France, the first monarch of the Bourbon dynasty in France.

Born in Paris, de Thou was a son of Augustin de Thou (d. 1544), Président of the Parlement of Paris; brother to Christophe de Thou (1508–82), who became Premier Président of the Parlement of Paris; and later, uncle to noted historian Jacques-Auguste de Thou.

De Thou became a canon of the Cathedral of Paris in 1547, and Bishop of Chartres by a bull of 8 April 1573. As bishop, he played a prominent role in the War of the Three Henrys (1584-1598), in which power was transferred from Henry III of France to Henry of Navarre, who then became Henry IV.

His antipathy for the Catholic League, shared by his brother Président Christophe de Thou, made his position difficult when the people of Chartres, who were devoted to the League, shut their gates to the troops of King Henry III on 17 January 1589 and subsequently welcomed Charles of Lorraine, Duke of Mayenne, recognizing the aged Cardinal de Bourbon as king.

Nicholas de Thou temporised, and on 20 April 1591 received in his place Henry of Navarre, the future Henry IV. On 21 September 1591 he attended the assembly of bishops, which declared "null, unjust and suggested by the malice of the enemies of France Pope Gregory XIV's Bull of Excommunication against Henry of Navarre, and on 25 July 1593 he assisted at Henry IV's abjuration in St.-Denis.

As Reims was still in the power of the Duke of Mayenne, Chartres was chosen for the coronation. To end the dispute with Renaud de Beaune, Archbishop of Bourges, who had just been appointed Archbishop of Sens and who claimed the honour of anointing the king, de Thou by a skillful move had himself appointed by Nicolas de Pellevé, the Archbishop of Reims, as his representative and was thus commissioned to proceed with the coronation. Instead of the Sainte Ampoule there was brought from Tours a miraculous oil preserved in Marmoutier Abbey. The anointing took place on 27 February 1594, and the next day Nicolas de Thou bestowed on the king the Collar of the Order of the Holy Ghost.

De Thou died at Villebon-sur-Yvette on 5 November 1598. He left various pastoral writings and a book entitled Cérémonies observées au sacre et couronnement d'Henri IV, roi de France.
