= George I Ghisi =

George I Ghisi (Italian: Giorgio Ghisi) (died 15 March 1311) was a Latin feudal lord in medieval Greece.

A son of Bartholomew I Ghisi, through his first marriage to a daughter of Guy II of Dramelay he was Baron of Chalandritsa in the Principality of Achaea. In 1292, he was also named as castellan of Kalamata. In that year, following a series of destructive raids in the Greek and Latin-held islands of the Aegean Sea, the Aragonese admiral Roger of Lauria led his fleet to anchor at Navarino. Fearful lest the Aragonese seize possession of lands in Achaea, or repeat their plundering raids, and with Prince Florent of Hainaut absent in Italy, George assembled two hundred knights at Androusa and attacked the Aragonese. In a brief but bloody combat, the Achaeans were defeated and George captured, only to be ransomed for 8,000 hyperpyra shortly after when the Aragonese fleet sailed to Glarentsa.

In 1303, when his father died, he inherited the lordship of the Aegean islands of Tinos, Mykonos, with fiefs on Serifos and Keos. Through his second wife, Alice dalle Carceri, he also became triarch of Negroponte (Euboea). He was killed in the Battle of the Cephissus against the Catalan Company in 1311. According to A. Bon, his wife Alice died in 1313.

== Sources ==
- Bon, Antoine (1969). La Morée franque. Recherches historiques, topographiques et archéologiques sur la principauté d'Achaïe [The Frankish Morea. Historical, Topographic and Archaeological Studies on the Principality of Achaea] (in French). Paris: De Boccard. OCLC 869621129.
- Loenertz, Raymond-Joseph (1975). Les Ghisi, dynastes vénitiens dans l'Archipel (1207-1390) (in French). Florence: Olschki.
- Miller, William (1908). The Latins in the Levant: A History of Frankish Greece (1204–1566). London: John Murray. OCLC 563022439.
- Setton, Kenneth M. (1975). Catalan Domination of Athens 1311–1388, Revised Edition. London: Variorum. ISBN 0-902089-77-3.

Preceded by Guy of Dramelay	Baron of Chalandritsa after 1285/86 – 1311	Unknown Next known title holder: Nicholas of Dramelay
Preceded by Bartholomew I Ghisi	Lord of Tinos and Mykonos; 1303–1311	Succeeded by Bartholomew II Ghisi
