= Rigney, Doubs =

Rigney
- Commune
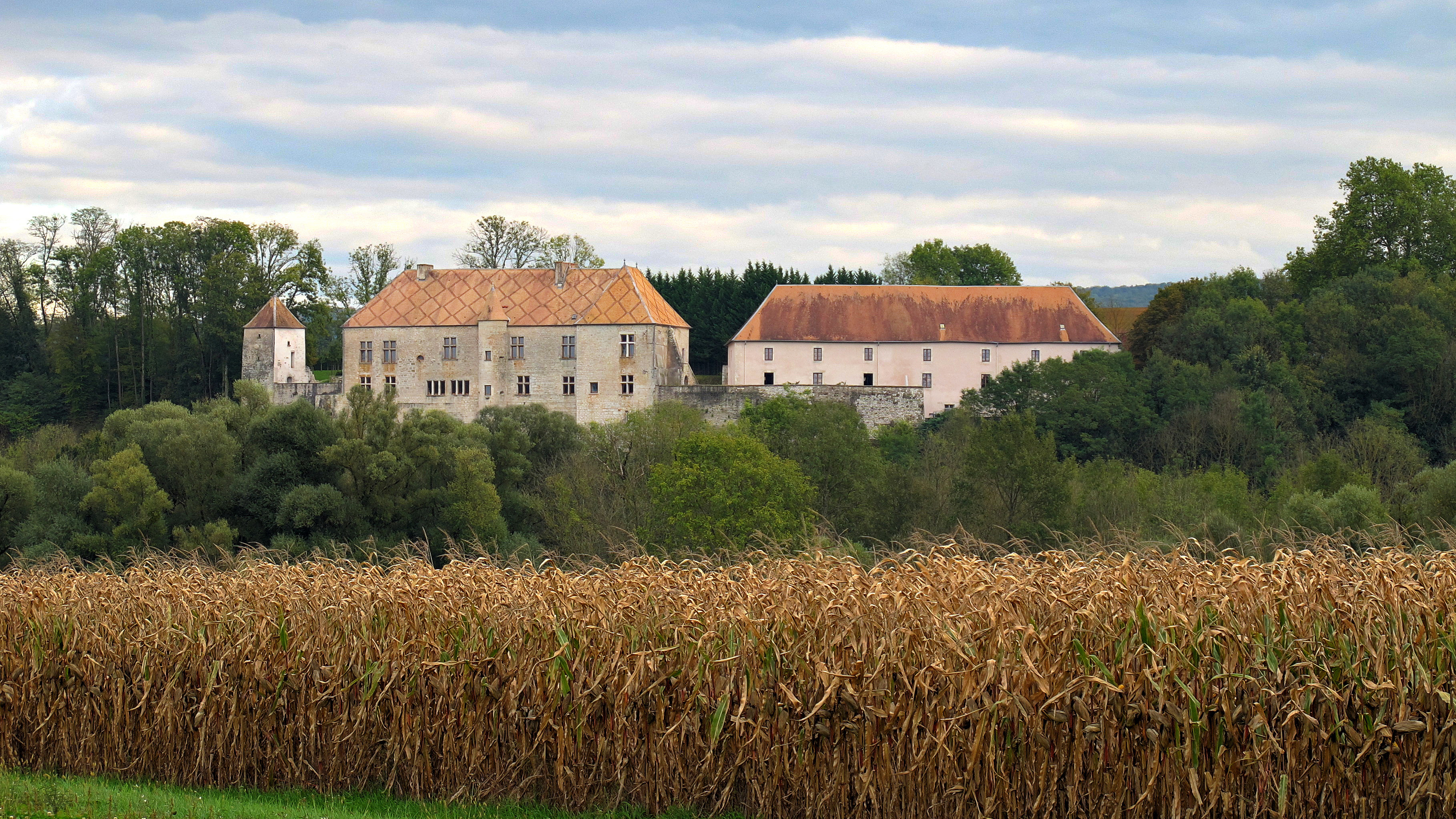
- Chateau of La Roche

- Coat of arms
- Location of Rigney
- Location within France Location within Bourgogne-Franche-Comté
- Coordinates: 47°23′20″N 6°10′36″E
- Country: France
- Region: Bourgogne-Franche-Comté
- Department: Doubs
- Arrondissement: Besançon
- Canton: Baume-les-Dames
- Intercommunality: Doubs Baumois

Government
  - Mayor (2020–2026): Nathalie Concet
- Area^{1}: 9.58 km^{2} (3.70 sq mi)
- Highest elevation: 436 m (1,430 ft)
- Lowest elevation: 227 m (745 ft)
- Population (2023): 367
  - Density: 38.3/km^{2} (99.2/sq mi)
- Time zone: UTC+01:00 (CET)
  - Summer (DST): UTC+02:00 (CEST)
- INSEE/Postal code: 25490 /25640
- ^{1} French Land Register data, which excludes lakes, ponds, glaciers > 1 km^{2} (0.386 sq mi or 247 acres) and river estuaries.

Rigney (French pronunciation: [ʁiɲɛ]) is a commune in the Doubs department in the Bourgogne-Franche-Comté region in eastern France. Its hamlet La Roche-sur-l'Ognon is also the most likely place of origin of the first ducal family of the Duchy of Athens, the de la Roche family.

== Population ==
Historical population
Year	Pop.	±% p.a.
1968	288	—
1975	285	−0.15%
1982	287	+0.10%
1990	346	+2.36%
1999	390	+1.34%
2007	427	+1.14%
2012	425	−0.09%
2017	390	−1.70%
2023	367	−1.01%
Source: INSEE

== See also ==
- Communes of the Doubs department
