= Manuel Bochalis =

Albanian military commander

Manuel Bochalis (Albanian: Manuel Bokali, Greek: Μανουήλ Μποχάλης) was an Albanian military commander in the service of the Despotate of the Morea and the Republic of Venice.

He was a son-in-law of the mesazon George Palaiologos. In 1453 he was governor of Leontari in Arcadia, but in the Morea revolt of 1453–1454 he fought against the Despot Thomas Palaiologos, was defeated and blinded. In 1459, during the civil war between Thomas Palaiologos and his brother and co-despot, Demetrios Palaiologos, Bochalis sided with the latter. Along with his father-in-law he captured Leontari, the capital of Thomas Palaiologos, but was forced to abandon the town, incurring many casualties, once Thomas arrived with his army.

During the Ottoman invasion of the Despotate in 1460, Bochalis led the defence of Gardiki Castle, where the inhabitants of Leontari had fled. When the Ottomans arrived, Sultan Mehmed II offered terms, but Bochalis rejected them. However, the crowd of refugees, some 6,000, made a prolonged resistance impossible: in the extreme heat of summer, water and supplies were quickly consumed, and after only a day of resistance to the Ottoman assault, Bochalis surrendered in exchange for promises of safety. Despite the promise to not harm, them, Mehmed ordered all defenders, including women and children, executed. Bochalis and his family were saved thanks to the intervention of Grand Vizier Mahmud Pasha Angelović, who was second cousin to Bochalis' wife. With Mahmud's aid, Bochalis and his family, including his father-in-law George Palaiologos, were escorted away, killed their Ottoman guards and escaped to Corfu, from where they moved to the Kingdom of Naples.

During the First Ottoman–Venetian War, Bochalis returned to fight for the Republic of Venice in the Morea, but was captured in 1468 by the Ottomans at Kalamata and executed by impalement.

== Sources ==
- Babinger, Franz (1960). Das Ende der Arianiten (in German). Munich: Bayerische Akademie der Wissenschaften. OCLC 876478494.
- Babinger, Franz (1992) [1978]. Mehmed the Conqueror and His Time. Bollingen Series 96. Translated from the German by Ralph Manheim. Edited, with a preface, by William C. Hickman. Princeton, New Jersey: Princeton University Press. ISBN 0-691-09900-6. OCLC 716361786.
- Miller, William (1908). The Latins in the Levant: A History of Frankish Greece (1204–1566). London: John Murray. OCLC 563022439.
- Stavrides, Théoharis (2001). The Sultan of Vezirs: The Life and Times of the Ottoman Grand Vezir Mahmud Pasha Angelovic (1453–1474). Brill. ISBN 978-90-04-12106-5.
- Stavrides, Theoharis (2016). "From Byzantine Aristocracy to Ottoman Ruling Elite: Mahmud Pasha Angelović and His Christian Circle, 1458–1474". In Christine Isom-Verhaaren; Kent F. Schull (eds.). Living in the Ottoman Realm: Empire and Identity, 13th to 20th Centuries. Bloomington: Indiana University Press. pp. 55–65. ISBN 978-0-2530-1948-6.
- Trapp, Erich; Beyer, Hans-Veit; Walther, Rainer; Sturm-Schnabl, Katja; Kislinger, Ewald; Leontiadis, Ioannis; Kaplaneres, Sokrates (1976–1996). Prosopographisches Lexikon der Palaiologenzeit (in German). Vienna: Verlag der Österreichischen Akademie der Wissenschaften. ISBN 3-7001-3003-1.
