= Barony of Chalandritsa =

European polity

- Barony of the Principality of Achaea
- 1209–1429
- Map of the Peloponnese with its principal locations during the late Middle Ages
- Capital: Chalandritsa
- Area
  - Coordinates: 38°7′N 21°48′E
  - Type: Feudal lordship
- Historical era: Middle Ages
  - Established: 1209
  - Byzantine reconquest: 1429
Succeeded by
Despotate of the Morea

The Barony of Chalandritsa was a medieval Frankish fiefdom of the Principality of Achaea, located in the northern Peloponnese peninsula in Greece, and centred on the town of Chalandritsa (Greek: Χαλανδρίτσα; French: Calandrice, Calendrice; Italian: Calandrizza; Aragonese: C[h]alandrica) south of Patras.

== History ==
The Barony of Chalandritsa was established ca. 1209, after the conquest of the Peloponnese by the Crusaders, and was one of the original twelve secular baronies within the Principality of Achaea. The barony was one of the smallest, with four knight's fiefs attached to it. The first baron was G. (probably Guy) of Dramelay (or Trimolay, Tremolay) from the namesake village in Burgundy, who is attested in the 1209 Treaty of Sapienza. Many older histories, following Jean Alexandre Buchon and Karl Hopf, have Audebert de la Trémouille as the first baron. His successor, Robert of Dramelay, is attested ca. 1230. It was he who built the castle of Chalandritsa according to the Greek and Italian versions of the Chronicle of the Morea. The Aragonese version of the Chronicle on the other hand reports a completely different story, according to which the castle of Chalandritsa had been built by Conrad of Aleman, Baron of Patras, and that it and other lands, comprising eight knight's fiefs, were purchased around 1259 by Prince William II of Villehardouin and given to a knight named Guy of Dramelay, who had only recently arrived in the Morea. While otherwise reliable, the Aragonese version is considered erroneous in this regard.

Robert's successor, Guy (II) of Dramelay (the Aragonese version's Guy), is known to have enlarged the barony by acquiring parts of the Lisarea as well as the neighbouring fief of Mitopoli (in 1280), served as bailli of the Principality for Charles I of Naples in 1282–85, and died shortly after. He was succeeded by his unnamed daughter and her husband, George I Ghisi, who was killed at the Battle of Cephissus in 1311. The last baron of the family was Nicholas of Dramelay, whose exact familial relation with the other Dramelays is unknown. Like most Achaean magnates, he initially supported the infante Ferdinand of Majorca's bid for the princely throne in 1315, but switched back to Matilda of Hainaut when she arrived in the Morea in early 1316. He died a few weeks later, and Chalandritsa was occupied by Ferdinand's troops, who defended it with success against an attack by Matilda's husband, Louis of Burgundy.

According to the Assizes of Romania, Nicholas' fief of Mitopoli was divided between Aimon of Rans and an otherwise unidentified Margaret of Cephalonia. According to the Aragonese version of the Chronicle of the Morea, however, after his victory over Ferdinand at the Battle of Manolada, Louis gave the entire vacant barony to two of his Burgundian followers, the aforementioned Aimon of Rans and his brother, Otho. Otho died soon after, and Aimon sold the domain to Martino Zaccaria, Lord of Chios, and returned to his homeland. The barony thereafter remained in the hands of the Zaccaria, although in a letter of 1324, half of it appears to be in the hands of Peter dalle Carceri. By 1361, however, Martino's son, Centurione I Zaccaria, is attested as holding the entire barony. He and his descendants retained it until 1429, when Centurione II Zaccaria was forced to hand it over to Thomas Palaiologos, the Byzantine Despot of the Morea, after a brief siege. Centurione was also forced to marry his daughter Catherine to Thomas, and retreated to his only remaining possession, the Barony of Arcadia, where he died in 1432.

== Sources ==
- Bon, Antoine (1969). La Morée franque. Recherches historiques, topographiques et archéologiques sur la principauté d'Achaïe [The Frankish Morea. Historical, Topographic and Archaeological Studies on the Principality of Achaea] (in French). Paris: De Boccard. OCLC 869621129.
- Miller, William (1921). Essays on the Latin Orient. Cambridge: Cambridge University Press.
- Topping, Peter (1975). "The Morea, 1311–1364". In Setton, Kenneth M.; Hazard, Harry W. (eds.). A History of the Crusades, Volume III: The Fourteenth and Fifteenth Centuries. Vol. 3. Madison and London: University of Wisconsin Press. pp. 104–140. ISBN 0-299-06670-3.
- Topping, Peter (1975). "The Morea, 1364–1460". In Setton, Kenneth M.; Hazard, Harry W. (eds.). A History of the Crusades, Volume III: The Fourteenth and Fifteenth Centuries. Vol. 3. Madison and London: University of Wisconsin Press. pp. 141–166. ISBN 0-299-06670-3.
