= Lepetit =

Lepetit or Le Petit is a French surname.

- Alfred Le Petit (1841–1909) French painter, caricaturist and photographer
- Annick Lepetit
- Claude Le Petit (1638–1662), French writer and poet
- Maturin Le Petit (1693–1739), Jesuit priest
- Ninot le Petit, possibly same as Jean Lepetit (fl. ca. 1500 – 1520), French composer
- Pierre Le Petit (1617–1686), French book printer and seller
- Sébastien Lepetit (1969–2025), French crime fiction writer
- Vincent Lepetit
