= Vilain I of Aulnay =

Vilain of Aulnay (French: Villain d'Aulnay/d'Aunoy) was a French knight from Aulnay-l'Aître in the Champagne who became marshal of the Latin Empire of Constantinople and first Baron of Arcadia in the Principality of Achaea. In the Greek version of the Chronicle of the Morea, he is attested as Βηλὲς ντὲ Ἀνόε, a form which passed to the other versions of the Chronicle as Anoé, Annoée or Anoée.

== Life ==
Vilain was seemingly the son of Oudard d'Aulnay, a Champenois nobleman who in 1206 succeeded Geoffrey of Villehardouin as marshal of Champagne, after the latter left to join the Fourth Crusade. The scholar J. Longnon considers it possible, but not verifiable, that Oudard's mother was a sister of Villehardouin. Oudard had three sons, Erard, Geoffrey and Vilain. The former two remained in Champagne, while Vilain soon departed to seek his fortune in the Latin Orient.

Vilain is attested for the first time in the Latin Empire in 1229, when he was sent, along with Ponce of Lyon, by the barons of the Empire to offer the regency over the young Baldwin II of Constantinople to John of Brienne. In 1238, he is already attested as "Marshal of Romania" (i.e. the Latin Empire) in the treaty whereby the Crown of Thorns was pawned to the Venetian Nicholas Quirini for the sum of 13,134 gold hyperpyra. In 1234, he was possibly sent on a diplomatic mission to the Queen of France, Blanche of Castile, on behalf of Baldwin II.

It appears that Vilain undertook frequent journeys to France, and in February 1249, his cousin, the Prince of Achaea William II of Villehardouin, ceded him in a letter to Thibaud IV, Count of Champagne, the proceeds of all the estates of the Villehardouin family in Champagne. In 1261, with the reconquest of Constantinople by the Byzantines and the collapse of the Latin Empire, Vilain was one of those nobles who fled to the court of Achaea. There William II, created for him a new barony out of lands taken from the princely domain, the Barony of Arcadia. Vilain died ca. 1269, and was succeeded by his sons, Erard I and Geoffrey.

== Sources ==
- Bon, Antoine (1969). La Morée franque. Recherches historiques, topographiques et archéologiques sur la principauté d'Achaïe [The Frankish Morea. Historical, Topographic and Archaeological Studies on the Principality of Achaea] (in French). Paris: De Boccard. OCLC 869621129.
- Longnon, Jean (1939). Recherches sur la vie de Geoffroy de Villehardouin: suivies du catalogue des actes des Villehardouins (in French). H. et É. Champion.
- de Mély, Fernand (1904). Riant, Paul Édouard Didier (ed.). Exuviæ sacræ constantinopolitanæ. Fasciculus documentorum minorum, ad byzantina lipsana in occidentem sæculo xiii translata. spectantium, & historiam quarti belli sacri imperii: gallo-græci illustrantium (in French). Vol. 3. Paris: E. Leroux.

New title	Baron of Arcadia c. 1261–1269	Succeeded by Erard I of Aulnay and Geoffrey of Aulnay
