= Geoffrey II of Briel =

Geoffrey II of Briel or Geoffrey of Briel the Younger, was a French knight and the cousin or nephew of Geoffrey I of Briel, Baron of Karytaina in the Principality of Achaea, in Frankish Greece.

== Biography ==
Geoffrey I of Briel died in 1275, and in 1279, Geoffrey the Younger came to Greece and tried, unsuccessfully, to claim the barony, which in the meantime had reverted to the princely domain due to Geoffrey the Elder's lack of direct male heirs. The 19th-century historian Karl Hopf erroneously placed Geoffrey's arrival in Greece in 1287, but the passage of Geoffrey from Italy to Greece in January 1279 is documented in the archives of the Kingdom of Naples. Undeterred, Geoffrey resolved to take part of his inheritance by force, if need be: he went to the Araklovon Castle, gained admittance by pretending to be ill, and immediately let in his armed companions (reportedly four equerries and a few local Greeks) and made himself master of the fortress. The Achaean troops quickly invested the fortress and besieged it, but Geoffrey had already called upon the Byzantine governor of Mystras for aid. The latter did indeed send troops to his assistance, but they were stopped at the borders of Skorta by the Frankish "Captain of Skorta", Simon of Vidoigne. In the end, Geoffrey was forced to capitulate and was accorded the small fief of Moraina.

Soon after his arrival and enfeoffment, in 1279 or 1280, he married Margaret, Lady of Lisarea, with whom he had a daughter, Helen, who wed Vilain II of Aulnay, Baron of Arcadia.

== Sources ==
- Bon, Antoine (1969). La Morée franque. Recherches historiques, topographiques et archéologiques sur la principauté d'Achaïe [The Frankish Morea. Historical, Topographic and Archaeological Studies on the Principality of Achaea] (in French). Paris: De Boccard. OCLC 869621129.
