= Erard III Le Maure =

Baron of Arcadia - Marshal of Achaea

Erard III Le Maure was Baron of Arcadia and Marshal of the Principality of Achaea in the mid-14th century.

== Life ==
Erard III was the son of Stephen Le Maure, lord of the castle of Saint-Sauveur, and of Agnes of Aulnay, daughter of Vilain II of Aulnay, baron of Arcadia. Stephen and Agnes married in 1324. On Vilain's death, the barony of Arcadia had been divided into two, with Agnes inheriting one half, and the other going to her brother Erard II and eventually his widow, Balzana Gozzadini, and her second husband Peter dalle Carceri.

Erard III succeeded his father sometime after 1330. Erard III is first mentioned among the Achaean barons who offered the principality to James II of Majorca in October 1344. It is likely that Erard was also the one chosen to travel and transmit the offer to James II, for which in November 1345—in James' only known act as Prince of Achaea—he received the title of Marshal of Achaea, and lands previously belonging to Nicholas Ghisi. Erard III managed to reunite the barony of Arcadia early on, and in a list of Achaean fiefs in 1377, he is also listed as holding the castle of Aetos.

In c. 1348, a French knight, Louis de Chafor, and a few companions, captured the castle of Arcadia by ruse, and took Erard's wife and daughter hostage. Erard had to pay a heavy ransom for them and his castle to be returned.

In 1373, after the death of Prince Philip III of Taranto, Erard III was member of an Achaean embassy sent to Naples to examine the rights of the rival claimants to the Principality: Philip's mother, Queen Joanna, and Francis of Les Baux. The embassy found in favour of the Queen, and swore allegiance to her.

Erard III died in 1388, and was succeeded by his son-in-law, Andronikos Asen Zaccaria.

== Family ==
Erard had a single son, who died in childhood, and several daughters. One of his daughters (or a sister), Lucia, married the merchant and diplomat John Laskaris Kalopheros, and had a son, named Erard. Another daughter, the heiress of the Barony of Arcadia Catherine Le Maure married Andronikos Asen Zaccaria, who succeeded Erard III after his death. The succession was disputed by Erard Laskaris, the son of Lucia and John Laskaris Kalopheros, but this claim came to nothing, and Erard Laskaris died in 1409 without descendants.

According to the early 15th-century Chronographia regum francorum, another daughter married Guy of Enghien, the Lord of Argos and Nauplia, but this is disputed by other sources.

== Sources ==
- Bon, Antoine (1969). La Morée franque. Recherches historiques, topographiques et archéologiques sur la principauté d'Achaïe [The Frankish Morea. Historical, Topographic and Archaeological Studies on the Principality of Achaea] (in French). Paris: De Boccard. OCLC 869621129.
- Luttrell, Anthony (1966). "The Latins of Argos and Nauplia: 1311-1394". Papers of the British School at Rome. 34. British School at Rome: 34–55. doi:10.1017/S0068246200007455. JSTOR 40310660. S2CID 179112752.
- Topping, Peter (1975). "The Morea, 1311–1364". In Setton, Kenneth M.; Hazard, Harry W. (eds.). A History of the Crusades, Volume III: The Fourteenth and Fifteenth Centuries. Madison and London: University of Wisconsin Press. pp. 104–140. ISBN 0-299-06670-3.
- Topping, Peter (1975). "The Morea, 1364–1460". In Setton, Kenneth M.; Hazard, Harry W. (eds.). A History of the Crusades, Volume III: The Fourteenth and Fifteenth Centuries. Madison and London: University of Wisconsin Press. pp. 141–166. ISBN 0-299-06670-3.

Preceded by Stephen Le Maure and Peter dalle Carceri	Baron of Arcadia; 1330/1344–1388	Succeeded by Andronikos Asen Zaccaria
