= Barony of Veligosti =

Medieval Frankish fiefdom

- Barony of the Principality of Achaea
- 1209–c. 1300/1380s
- Map of the Peloponnese with its principal locations during the late Middle Ages
- Capital: Veligosti, then Damala
  - Type: Feudal lordship
- Historical era: Middle Ages
  - Established: 1209
  - Disestablished: c. 1300/1380s
Succeeded by
Despotate of the Morea

The Barony of Veligosti or Veligosti–Damala was a medieval Frankish fiefdom of the Principality of Achaea, originally centred on Veligosti (Greek: Βελίγοστι or Βελιγόστη; French: Véligourt; Spanish: Viligorda; Italian: Villegorde) in southern Arcadia, but also came to include the area of Damala (Greek: Δαμαλᾶ, French: Damalet) in the Argolid when it came under a cadet branch of the de la Roche family in the 1250s. After Veligosti was lost to the Byzantines towards 1300, the name was retained even though the barony was reduced to Damala.

== History ==
Veligosti, near ancient Megalopolis, appears to have fallen to the Frankish Crusaders without resistance c. 1206. The name's origin is obscure. The 19th-century historian Karl Hopf thought that the Greek name derived from the French form Véligourt, in turn possibly a corruption of Valaincourt/Walincourt, which Hopf proposed as the place of origin of the original baronial line of Mons. The Valaincourt family was indeed represented in the Fourth Crusade, but as the French medievalist Antoine Bon pointed out, there is nothing other than the similarity of the names to link them to the Frankish Morea. Bon himself considers the form "Veligosti" to be the original one—of ultimately Slavic origin—and the French name to have been derived from it.

The barony, established c. 1209, was one of the twelve original secular baronies of the Principality of Achaea and comprised four knight's fiefs. According to the list of signatories of the Treaty of Sapienza in 1209, the first baron was Hugh of Mons, succeeded (some time before 1230) by Matthew of Mons, who is the first baron to be mentioned in the Chronicle of the Morea. Matthew held the barony until his marriage to a Byzantine princess, a daughter of Theodore II Laskaris, during a mission to the court of the Empire of Nicaea sometime in the 1250s. Karl Hopf, who was unaware of the Treaty of Sapienza, conjectured the existence of two barons of the same name, Matthew I and II, to fill the period from 1209, and that it was the latter who married the princess.

Matthew of Mons disappears from the sources after his marriage, and the fief and the associated title apparently passed on to a junior branch of the de la Roche family, whose senior branch ruled the Duchy of Athens. Already in a document dated to 1256, William de la Roche is mentioned as "lord of Veligosti" (dominus Villegordus). The process of the transfer is obscure; Hopf hypothesized that a sister of Matthew of Mons may have married William de la Roche. William, a younger brother of the Duke of Athens Guy I de la Roche, also held the region of Damala in the Argolid as a fief, and the two domains became united under the same title.

Damala (ancient and modern Troezen) had been captured easily in the first days of the Frankish conquest of the Morea, unlike the neighbouring citadels of Argos and Nauplia, which continued to resist until 1212. Although the latter were given as a separate fief to the de la Roche dukes of Athens, Damala itself is not mentioned in the lists of barons of Achaea in the French and Greek versions of the Chronicle of the Morea, which date to c. 1228/30. Only the Aragonese version mentions a knight—apparently to be identified with William de la Roche—who received six fiefs in the area and raised a castle, as well as the possession of three fiefs there by the Foucherolles family. These reports date to the second half of the century, and the area appears to have been entirely devoid of Frankish presence before that. James de la Roche, evidently William's son, is then mentioned as "lord of Veligosti" in the Aragonese version, while in the early 14th century, Renaud "de Véligourt", son of James and Maria Aleman, daughter of the Baron of Patras William Aleman, is mentioned as "lord of Damala" (sires de Damalet).

From the 1260s, Veligosti became an important base for the Principality of Achaea in its war against the Byzantine province of Mystras in the southeastern Morea. Along with Nikli it guarded the passes leading from Byzantine territory into the plateau of central Arcadia, the heart of the peninsula. After c. 1272 the Frankish presence at Veligosti began to come under increasing threat, as the Byzantines gradually encroached into the area. By c. 1300, both Nikli and Veligosti had been lost to the Franks, and indeed seem to have been razed and/or abandoned entirely, as they are no longer mentioned in the sources. Although now confined to the fief of Damala, the family continued to use the title of Veligosti, or rather its French version, Véligourt, thereafter.

Renaud was probably killed at the Battle of Halmyros in 1311, and his heiress, Jacqueline de la Roche, married Martino Zaccaria in 1327, who was also Lord of Chios and Baron of Chalandritsa, some time before 1325. Martino was succeeded by his two sons, first Bartholomew, and after his death in 1336, Centurione I. After Centurione's death in 1382, Damala seems to have been lost to the Zaccaria.

== Sources ==
- Bon, Antoine (1969). La Morée franque. Recherches historiques, topographiques et archéologiques sur la principauté d'Achaïe [The Frankish Morea. Historical, Topographic and Archaeological Studies on the Principality of Achaea] (in French). Paris: De Boccard. OCLC 869621129.
- Miller, William (1921). Essays on the Latin Orient. Cambridge: Cambridge University Press.
- Topping, Peter (1975). "The Morea, 1364–1460". In Setton, Kenneth M.; Hazard, Harry W. (eds.). A History of the Crusades, Volume III: The Fourteenth and Fifteenth Centuries. Vol. 3. Madison and London: University of Wisconsin Press. pp. 141–166. ISBN 0-299-06670-3.
