= Christophe de Thou =

French jurist (1508–1582)

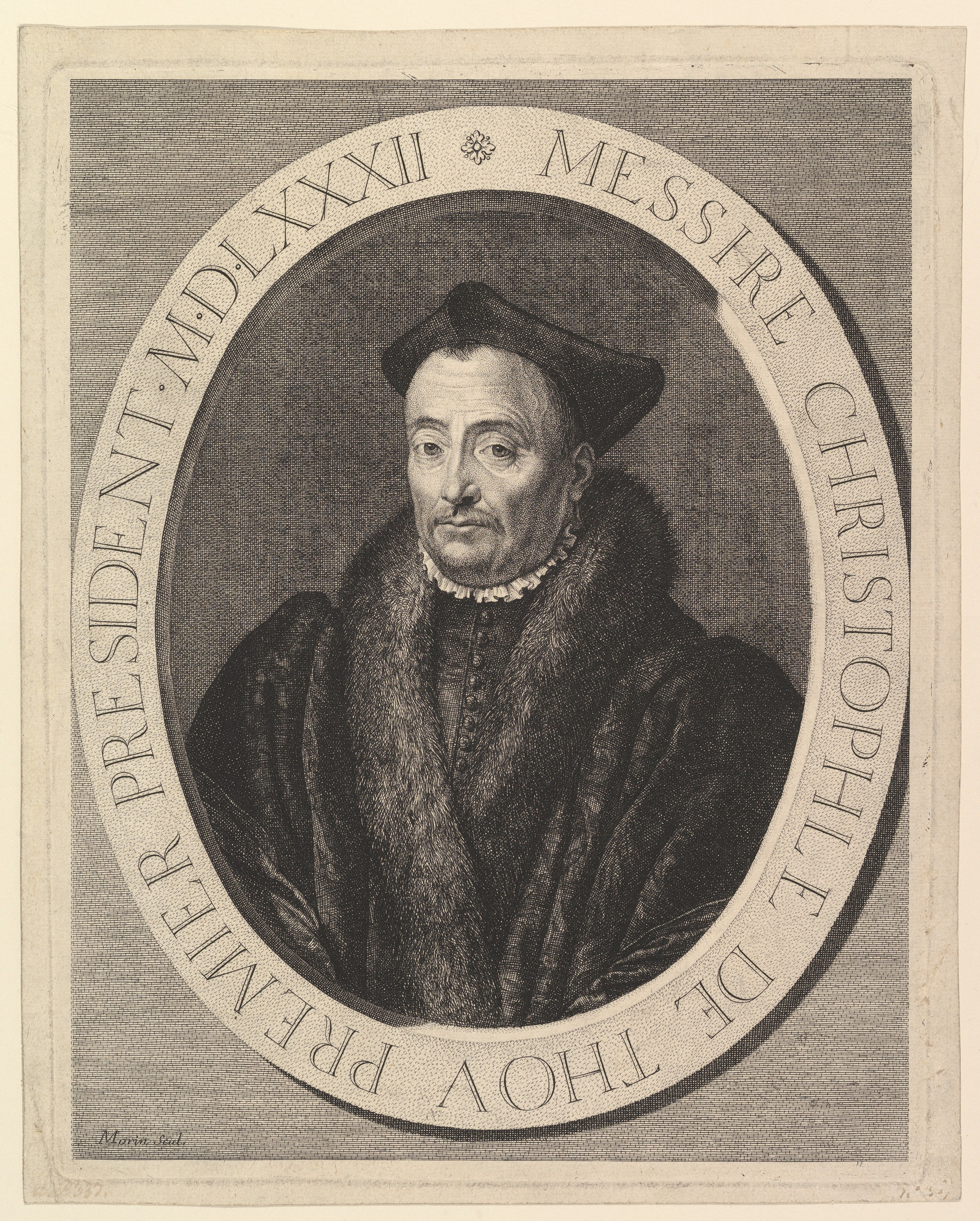
Christophe de Thou, by Jean Morin, Metropolitan Museum of Art

Christophe de Thou (1508 – 1 November 1582) was a French lawyer, and the First President of the Parlement of Paris.

De Thou became Président in 1554, and Premier Président on 14 December 1562, of the Parlement de Paris. He also served as chancellor to the Duke of Anjou and Duke of Alençon, and advisor to Henry II of France, Charles IX of France, and Henry III of France.

De Thou was a member of a respected family from Champagne. He was son of Augustin de Thou (d. 1544) and Claude de Thou (d 1523), also Président of the Parlement de Paris, and brother to Nicolas de Thou, the Bishop of Chartres. His son, Jacques Auguste de Thou (1553–1617), became a noted French historian. He was also the husband of Jacqueline de Tuleu and father of Anne de Thou and Jacques Auguste de Thou.
