= Alissos =

Alissos Αλισσός
- Community
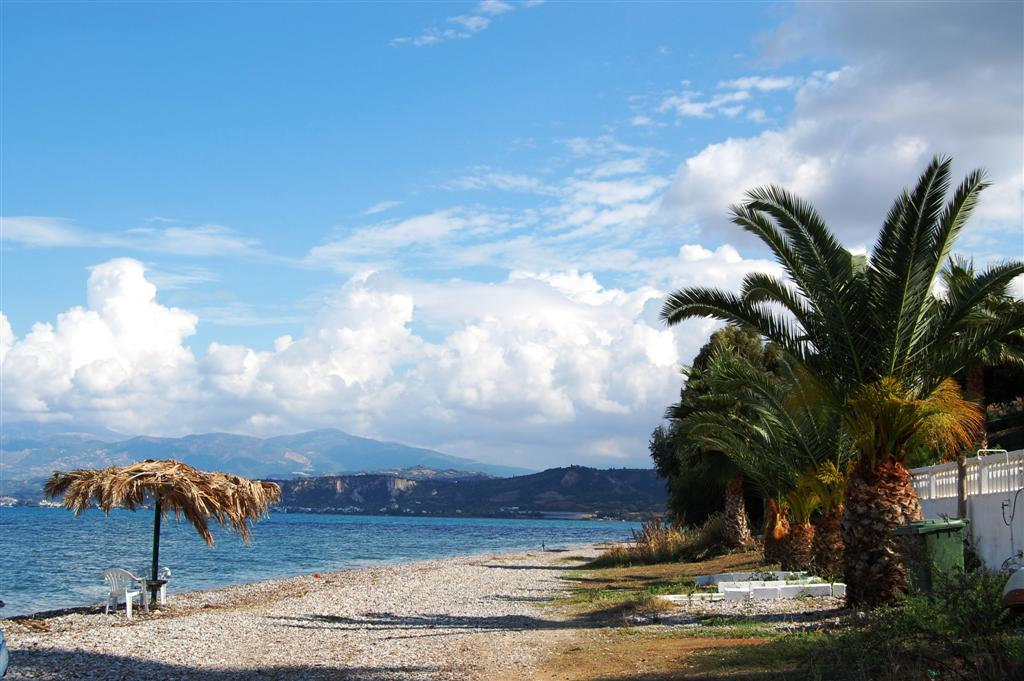
- Kato Alissos

- Location within Greece
- Coordinates: 38°8′N 21°35′E
- Country: Greece
- Administrative region: West Greece
- Regional unit: Achaea
- Municipality: West Achaea
- Municipal unit: Dymi
- Elevation: 40 m (130 ft)

Population (2021)
  - Community: 799
- Time zone: UTC+2 (EET)
  - Summer (DST): UTC+3 (EEST)
- Postal code: 252 00
- Area code: 26930

Alissos (Greek: Αλισσός) is a village and a community in the municipal unit of Dymi, Achaea, Greece. It is located near the Gulf of Patras, 3 km east of Kato Achaia, 3 km southwest of Kaminia and 17 km southwest of Patras. The community consists of the villages Alissos, Kamenitsa, Paralia Alissou and Profitis Elissaios. The Greek National Road 9 (Patras - Pyrgos) and the railway from Patras to Pyrgos run between Alissos and Paralia Alissou.

== History ==
Alissos was known as Lisarea or Lysaria (Greek: Λισσαρέα or Λησαρέα; French: la Lisarée) during the period of Frankish rule in the late Middle Ages. According to the Chronicle of the Morea, it was a fief of the Barony of Akova, held in the late 1270s by Margaret of Lisarea (or Jeanne), a cousin of Walter of Rosières, baron of Akova. She married Geoffrey II of Briel. The fief was then inherited by their daughter, Helen, and her husband, Vilain II of Aulnay, Baron of Arcadia. Lisarea disappears thereafter, until ca. 1377, when it was held by Centurione I Zaccaria.

== Historical population ==
Year	Village population	Community population
1991	-	1,073
2001	586	933
2011	418	750
2021	525	799

== See also ==
- List of settlements in Achaea
