= Pedro de San Superano =

Prince of Achaea

Pedro de San Superano (also spelled San Superán, in French Pierre de Saint-Superan; died 1402) was one of the captains of the Navarrese Company in the Morea from 1379 until he was made Prince of Achaea in 1396, a post he held to his death.

== Names ==
Pedro de San Superano appears with a significant number of names in the bibliography. Below, his name is shown as used by himself, as well as by contemporaries in letters of the period. Furthermore, the multitude of different names in later bibliography is also presented.

In a letter of 17 July 1385, Pedro himself signs as Petro de Sancto Superano, capitano Principatus de la Morerya (during the time that he was military captain in the Principality of Morea, while Mahiot de Coquerel was bailli of the Principality).

On 12 September 1382, in another letter, he is referred to as lo bort den Sen Subra, which the author of the book (1947) inscribes with a question mark and explains: «Bort de Sant Cebriá (also known as Pere de San Superano)»

In a letter of 17 April 1387, he is referred to as Petro de Sent Siura capetano e vicario generali principatus d Acaya

At the same book of 1947, the author comments a letter of Agnes Acciajuoli, who was writing to her brother Donat) and he refers to Pedro as «Pierre Bordeaux de Saint Superán, the so-called Bort de Sant Cebriá».

In a book of 1907, obtain the information that Pierre de San Superan and Varvassa, commanders, are mentioned for the first time in 1380, as well as that San Superan received the citizenship of Bordeaux from the Black Prince.

In another work he appears as Pierre Bordeaux de Saint Superan, Signore de Landirans. Saint Superan (in French) or San Superano (in Catalan) refers to a castle, possibly close to Landiras 19 miles south-southeast of Bordeaux. In the area of Landiras there is a castle (Château de Landiras) built in 1306.

In an edition of 1913 Pedro is referred to as S. Superan-Landiras.

From a reference of 1382, he appears as Pierre Lebourd de Saint-Supéran, together with Bérard de Varvassa and elsewhere just Pierre Lebourd and in anοther modification as Petrus Lebord de Sancto Superano

In a source of 1994 he is referred to as Pedro Bordo de San Superano and in another from 1885 Pedro Bordo de St. Exupery with the explanation "or the bastard of San Superano".

Finally, in a source of 1883, he is referred to as «Pierre de Saint Exupéry, called in latin and italian texts as Petrus de Sancto Superano, Petro de San Superano, named Bordo or Bordeaux from the place of his birth».

== Life ==
After the remnants of the first Navarrese company moved from Durazzo to the Morea, probably in 1378, they appeared reorganised under three chiefs, captains, named Mahiot de Coquerel, Berard de Varvassa, and Pedro Bordo. In 1381, Mahiot, the chiefest of the three, was raised to the position of bailiff of Achaea by the Latin Emperor James of Baux, while Pedro and Berard appeared as his imperial captains. Following the death (1383) of James, his successors, Charles III of Naples and his son Ladislaus, failed to maintain control of their principality of Achaea and the Navarrese Company held the power in the region. The Company negotiated between competing claimants to the principality and the Republic of Venice. Mahiot died in 1386 and Pedro succeeded him as the de facto ruler of the Company and the Morea. On 26 July 1387, Pedro, with the backing of both the secular and ecclesiastic authority in Greece, confirmed a treaty with Venice whereby she was ceded rights in the port of Navarino.

On 6 September that year, Pope Urban VI declared that as James of Baux's successors had forfeited their rights to the Holy See, the principality belonged to him and he devolved its government on Paul Foscari, the archbishop of Patras, who in turn made Pedro vicar general. Pedro was constantly at war with the Despotate of Morea, against whom he even used Ottoman pirates, and the Duchy of Athens under Nerio I Acciaioli. The latter was captured near Vostitsa on 10 September 1389 while trying to sit to talks with Pedro concerning Argos and Nauplia. He had to buy his freedom with concessions to the Navarrese ally, Venice. Late in 1394 or early in 1395, the Turkish general Evrenos Beg invaded the despotate and met Pedro's forces at Leontari. Together the two besieged and took Akova (28 February). After Evrenos returned to Thessaly, Pedro was defeated by the Greeks and taken captive with the grand constable Andronico Asano Zaccaria, his brother-in-law. In December, Venice paid 50,000 hyperpers for the release of her allies.

Early the next year, Pedro agreed to pay 3,000 ducats to Ladislaus in return for the title Prince of Achaea. He was invested with the principality, but never did end up making his payments. In that year, Pedro cooperated with Venice to refortify the Hexamilion and settle boundary disputes over Modon and Coron. Following the Battle of Nicopolis, the Ottoman sultan Bayezid I turned his attention to reducing the remaining Christian states in Greece. This drew Pedro and the despot of Morea, Theodore I Palaeologus, into alliance. The Order of St John was on board, but the Venetian senate refused to aid the Byzantines. In 1399, Pedro defeated an invasive Turkish army and received the titles of papal vicar and gonfalonier of Achaea from Boniface IX (15 February 1400). The Christian alliance did not last, however, and Pedro raided the Venetian possessions of Modon and Coron in 1401. Pedro died the next year, leaving Achaea with his infant son under the regency of his wife, Maria II Zaccaria. Maria gave the regency to her nephew Centurione II, who promptly paid the outstanding sum required by Ladislaus and received investment as prince.

== Sources ==
- Bon, Antoine (1969). La Morée franque. Recherches historiques, topographiques et archéologiques sur la principauté d'Achaïe [The Frankish Morea. Historical, Topographic and Archaeological Studies on the Principality of Achaea] (in French). Paris: De Boccard. OCLC 869621129.
- Fine, John V. A. Jr. (1994) [1987]. The Late Medieval Balkans: A Critical Survey from the Late Twelfth Century to the Ottoman Conquest. Ann Arbor, Michigan: University of Michigan Press. ISBN 978-0-472-10079-8.
- Setton, Kenneth M.; Hazard, Harry W., eds. (1975). A History of the Crusades, Volume III: The Fourteenth and Fifteenth Centuries. Vol. 3. Madison and London: University of Wisconsin Press. ISBN 0-299-06670-3.
- Setton, Kenneth M. (1975). Catalan Domination of Athens 1311–1380. London: Variorum.
- Topping, Peter (1975). "The Morea, 1364–1460". In Setton, Kenneth M.; Hazard, Harry W. (eds.). A History of the Crusades, Volume III: The Fourteenth and Fifteenth Centuries. Vol. 3. Madison and London: University of Wisconsin Press. pp. 141–166. ISBN 0-299-06670-3.

Vacant Title last held by Charles III of Naples	Prince of Achaea; 1396–1402	Succeeded by Maria II Zaccaria
