= John Chauderon =

John Chauderon (French: Jean Chauderon; died 1294) was the Baron of Estamira and Grand Constable of the Principality of Achaea, the strongest of the principalities of Frankish Greece.

He succeeded his father, Geoffrey Chauderon, Baron of Estamira and Grand Constable of Achaea, in 1278. He married Guillerme, a daughter of Richard Orsini.

Like many Achaean nobles, he spent much time at the court of Achaea's suzerain, King Charles I of Anjou, acting as an important link between Achaea and Naples. He also received lands in Italy from King Charles, who entrusted him with important diplomatic missions.

In 1278, as Prince William of Villehardouin lay dying, he designated John as his bailli, until King Charles of Anjou could make his own arrangements.

In 1292 or 1293, he went on a diplomatic mission to the Byzantine court in Constantinople along with Geoffrey of Aulnay, in order to obtain the recovery of the fortress of Kalamata, which had shortly before been seized by local Slavs and handed over to the Byzantine governor of Mystras. The embassy succeeded in obtaining only a verbal promise, and that thanks to the intercession of the Angevin ambassador to Constantinople, but the emperor also sent orders to his local governor to refuse to hand the castle over. In the event, Kalamata was surrendered to the Achaeans due to the intervention of a local Greek magnate.

After his death in 1294, he was succeeded as Grand Constable by his brother-in-law Engilbert of Liederkerque.

== Sources ==
- Bon, Antoine (1969). La Morée franque. Recherches historiques, topographiques et archéologiques sur la principauté d'Achaïe [The Frankish Morea. Historical, Topographic and Archaeological Studies on the Principality of Achaea] (in French). Paris: De Boccard. OCLC 869621129.
- Nicolas Cheetham, Mediaeval Greece. New Haven: Yale University Press, 1981. p. 95.
