= Dramelay =

Commune in Bourgogne-Franche-Comté, France

- Commune
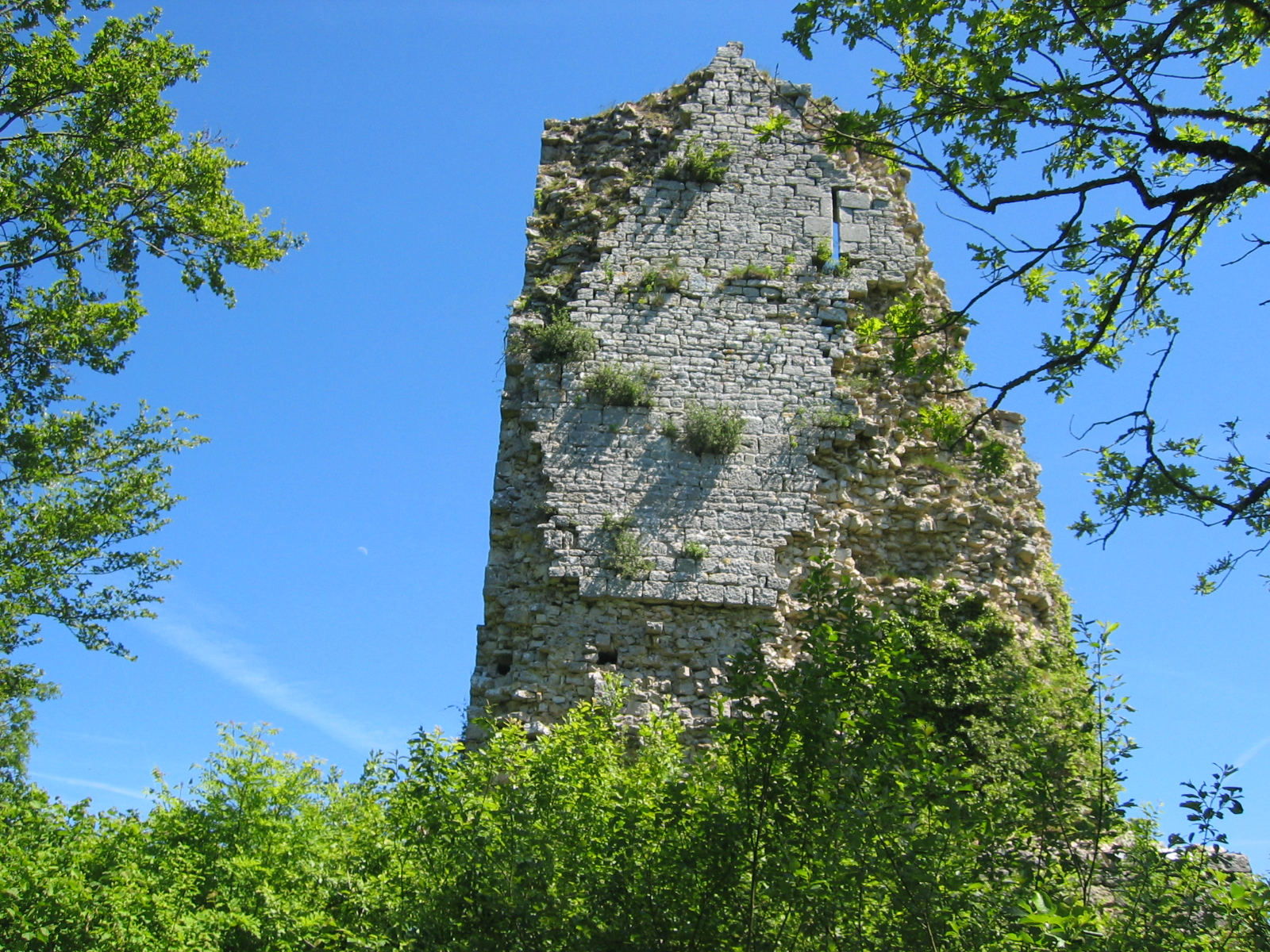
- Tower of the Chateau

- Coat of arms
- Location of Dramelay
- Location within France Location within Bourgogne-Franche-Comté
- Coordinates: 46°24′27″N 5°32′12″E
- Country: France
- Region: Bourgogne-Franche-Comté
- Department: Jura
- Arrondissement: Lons-le-Saunier
- Canton: Moirans-en-Montagne

Government
  - Mayor (2020–2026): Philippe Lamard
- Area^{1}: 6.53 km^{2} (2.52 sq mi)
- Highest elevation: 629 m (2,064 ft)
- Lowest elevation: 340 m (1,120 ft)
- Population (2023): 27
  - Density: 4.1/km^{2} (11/sq mi)
- Time zone: UTC+01:00 (CET)
  - Summer (DST): UTC+02:00 (CEST)
- INSEE/Postal code: 39204 /39240
- ^{1} French Land Register data, which excludes lakes, ponds, glaciers > 1 km^{2} (0.386 sq mi or 247 acres) and river estuaries.

Dramelay (French pronunciation: [dʁamlɛ]) is a commune in the Jura department in Bourgogne-Franche-Comté in eastern France.

== Population ==
Historical population
Year	Pop.	±% p.a.
1968	45	—
1975	43	−0.65%
1982	43	+0.00%
1990	44	+0.29%
1999	32	−3.48%
2007	31	−0.40%
2012	35	+2.46%
2017	29	−3.69%
2023	27	−1.18%
Source: INSEE

== See also ==
- Communes of the Jura department
