= Barony of Estamira =

- Barony of the Principality of Achaea
- after 1230 – 1290s ca. 1370 – 1429
- Map of the Peloponnese with its principal locations during the late Middle Ages
- Capital: Estamira
  - Type: Feudal lordship
- Historical era: Middle Ages
  - Established: after 1230
  - Reabsorption into the princely domain: 1290s
  - Re-establishment for Centurione I Zaccaria: ca. 1370
  - Conquest by the Byzantine Empire: 1429
Succeeded by
Despotate of the Morea

The Barony of Estamira or Stamira was a medieval Frankish fiefdom of the Principality of Achaea, located in the fertile plains of the Elis region of the Peloponnese peninsula in Greece, and centred on the now vanished fortress of Estamira (variously also Estamirra, Stamirra, later Stamero or Stamiro, Greek: Στάμηρον).

== History ==
The Barony of Estamira was not one of the original baronies into which the Principality of Achaea was divided by the Crusaders after the conquest of the Peloponnese. Instead, it was created some time after 1230, its territory originally forming part of the princely domain. It comprised 12 knight's fiefs and was granted to Geoffrey Chauderon, probably of Champenois origin, who was also the Grand Constable of the Principality. Died in 1278, Geoffrey was succeeded in the barony and as a constable by his son John Chauderon. A daughter, her name unknown, is also mentioned, who was sent to Constantinople in 1261 as a hostage to the Byzantine court. Apart from Estamira, John also acquired possession of Roviata and lands in Italy, some of which he exchanged in 1289 with Hugh, Count of Brienne for the fortress of Beauvoir (Pontikokastron). He is known to have had only a daughter, Bartholomée, who succeeded him in some of his domains in 1294. The fate of the barony is unclear, but it seems that at some point it reverted to the princely domain; in 1315–1316 it was held by the forces of Ferdinand of Majorca.

Finally, some time in the late 14th century, possibly in 1370, Prince Philip III ceded the barony, along with the title of Grand Constable, to Centurione I Zaccaria. The barony remained in Zaccaria's hands until the end of the Principality at the hands of the Byzantines of the Despotate of the Morea in 1429. Theodora Tocco, wife of the Despot Constantine Palaiologos, died at Stameron/Estamira (often confused with Santameri Castle) in November 1429. The castle of Estamira is reported as being in ruins in 1467; its location is now forgotten, but should lie east of Gastouni.

== Sources ==
- Bon, Antoine (1969). La Morée franque. Recherches historiques, topographiques et archéologiques sur la principauté d'Achaïe [The Frankish Morea. Historical, Topographic and Archaeological Studies on the Principality of Achaea] (in French). Paris: De Boccard. OCLC 869621129.
