= Jean Alexandre Buchon =

French scholar (1791–1849)

- Born: May 21, 1791
- Died: August 29, 1849 (aged 58)

Academic work
- Discipline: History

Jean Alexandre Buchon (21 May 1791 – 29 August 1849) was a French scholar born at Menetou-Salon (Cher).

Buchon was an ardent Liberal and took an active part in party struggles under the Restoration, while throwing himself into the historical regeneration then taking place.

During 1822 and the succeeding years he travelled about Europe in search of materials for his Collection des chroniques nationales françaises écrites en langue vulgaire, du XIe au XVIe siècle (4 vols, 1824–1829).

After the revolution of 1830 he founded the Pantheon littéraire, in which he published a Choix d'ouvrages mystiques (1843), a Choix de monuments primitifs de l'église chrêtienne (1837), a Choix des historiens grecs (1837), a collection of Chroniques trangres relatives aux expeditions françaises pendant le XIII siècle (1840), and, most important of all, a Choix de chroniques et mémoires sur l'histoire de France (1836–1841).

His travels in southern Italy and in the East had put him upon the track of the medieval French settlements in those regions, and to this subject he devoted several important works:

- Recherches et matriaux pour servir d'une histoire de la domination française dans les provinces de membres de l'empire grec (1840)
- Nouvelles recherches historiques sur la principaute française de More et ses hautes baronnies (2 vols, 1843–1844)
- Histoire des conquètes et de l'établissement des Français dans les états de l'ancienne Grèce sous es Villehardouin (1846, unfinished)

None of his publications can be described as thoroughly scholarly but they have been of great service to history, and those concerning the East have a special value of original research.
