= Barony of Arcadia =

Frankish fiefdom of the Principality of Achaea in Greece (1261–1432)

- Barony of the Principality of Achaea
- c. 1261–1432
- Map of the Peloponnese with its principal locations during the late Middle Ages
- Capital: Arcadia (Kyparissia)
- Area
  - Coordinates: 37°14′N 21°40′E
  - Type: Feudal lordship
- Historical era: Middle Ages
  - Established: c. 1261
  - Byzantine reconquest: 1432
Preceded by	Succeeded by
Principality of Achaea	Despotate of the Morea

The Barony of Arcadia was a medieval Frankish fiefdom of the Principality of Achaea, located on the western coast of the Peloponnese peninsula in Greece, and centred on the town of Arcadia (Greek: Ὰρκαδία; French: l'Arcadie; Italian: Arc[h]adia), ancient and modern Kyparissia.

== History ==
The Barony of Arcadia was not one of the original twelve secular baronies of the Principality. Initially, Arcadia—the medieval name of Kyparissia on the western coast of Messenia—formed part of the princely domain of the Villehardouin family. It was created as a separate barony by Prince William II of Villehardouin shortly after the Byzantine reconquest of Constantinople in 1261, to recompense Vilain of Aulnay, one of the Frankish lords of the Latin Empire of Constantinople who sought refuge in Achaea.

After Vilain's death in 1269 it was divided between his sons, Erard and Geoffrey. Erard disappears after 1279, when he was captured by the Byzantines, but Geoffrey did not manage to reclaim his brother's portion until 1293, due to the obstructions of the Angevin baillis, who sequestered the domain. He was succeeded sometime after 1297 by Vilain II, who was in turn succeeded by his two children, Erard II and Agnes. Erard II died some time before 1338, but Peter dalle Carceri, Triarch of Negroponte, is already attested as lord of half the barony in 1324, and it is usually assumed that Erard II left his half of the barony to his widow, Balzana Gozzadini, who took Peter as a second husband. Balzana died soon after. Agnes married in 1324 Stephen Le Maure ("The Moor"), Lord of Saint-Sauveur and Aetos, and had a son, Erard III, who by 1344 managed to reunite the barony, and was named marshal of Achaea in 1345. In 1348, a Burgundian knight, Louis of Chafor, with some companions, managed to take over the castle of Arcadia and hold Erard's wife and children captive until Erard paid a large ransom. Erard was succeeded in 1388 by one of his daughters, who married Andronikos Asanes Zaccaria, and the barony became part of the Zaccaria domain. The Zaccaria claim was disputed by Erard Laskaris, a grandson or nephew of Erard III, but without success; Laskaris died childless in 1409.

Arcadia was the last holdout of the Principality. After the conquest of Patras and Chalandritsa by the Byzantines of the Despotate of the Morea in 1429–30, which signalled the de facto end of the Principality, the last Prince, Centurione II Zaccaria, retained Arcadia as his personal fief, but after his death in 1432, his son-in-law, Despot Thomas Palaiologos, annexed it and imprisoned Centurione's widow, who died in prison.

== Barons ==
- Vilain I of Aulnay, 1262–1269
- Erard I of Aulnay, 1269–1279, and his brother
- Geoffrey of Aulnay, 1269–1297
- Vilain II of Aulnay, 1297–unknown
- Erard II of Aulnay, unknown–before 1338 (1324?), and his sister
- Agnes of Aulnay with her husband Stephen Le Maure (married 1324), unknown–after 1330
- Balzana Gozzadini, widow of Erard II, with Peter dalle Carceri, ca. 1338 (1324?)
- Erard III Le Maure, after 1330–1388
- Catherine Le Maure with her husband Andronikos Asanes Zaccaria, 1388–1401
- Erard IV Zaccaria, 1401
- Centurione II Zaccaria, 1401–1432
- John Asen Zaccaria, 1432-1446

== Sources ==
- Bon, Antoine (1969). La Morée franque. Recherches historiques, topographiques et archéologiques sur la principauté d'Achaïe [The Frankish Morea. Historical, Topographic and Archaeological Studies on the Principality of Achaea] (in French). Paris: De Boccard. OCLC 869621129.
- Topping, Peter (1975). "The Morea, 1311–1364". In Setton, Kenneth M.; Hazard, Harry W. (eds.). A History of the Crusades, Volume III: The Fourteenth and Fifteenth Centuries. Madison and London: University of Wisconsin Press. pp. 104–140. ISBN 0-299-06670-3.
- Topping, Peter (1975). "The Morea, 1364–1460". In Setton, Kenneth M.; Hazard, Harry W. (eds.). A History of the Crusades, Volume III: The Fourteenth and Fifteenth Centuries. Madison and London: University of Wisconsin Press. pp. 141–166. ISBN 0-299-06670-3.
