= Andros =

Andros may refer to:

== Places ==
- Andros, Greece, an island in Greece
  - Andros (city), an ancient city on the Greek island
  - Andros (town), the capital of the Greek island
- Andros, The Bahamas, an island in the Atlantic Ocean
  - Andros Town, a town on that island in the Bahamas

== Other uses ==
- Andros (company), French food company
- Andros (name), a given name and surname (including a list of people with the name)
- ANDROS, a military and police robot
- Andros Maritime Museum, a museum in Andros, Greece
- Andros Trophy, the French national ice racing championship
- Andrée & Rosenqvist, a boat building yard and engineering works in Finland

== See also ==
- Battle of Andros (disambiguation)
