= Gaurium =

Coordinates: 37°53′08″N 24°44′15″E

Gaurium or Gaurion (Ancient Greek: Γαύριον), also known as Gaureleon, was a town of ancient Greece on the island of Andros that acted as the harbour for the poleis of Andros.

Its site is located near modern Gavrio.
