= Andros (city) =

City-state on the island of Andros

Coordinates: 37°48′57″N 24°49′37″E

Andros (Ancient Greek: Ἄνδρος) was the chief city of, and a polis (city-state) on, the island of Andros in the Aegean Sea. The city was named after the island, which, according to tradition, derived its name either from Andreus, a general of Rhadamanthus or from the seer Andrus. It was colonized by Ionians, and early attained so much importance as to send colonies to Acanthus and Stageira in Chalcidice about 654 BCE. The Andrians were compelled to join the fleet of Xerxes I in his invasion of Greece, in 480 BCE; in consequence of which Themistocles attempted to levy a large sum of money from the people, and upon their refusing to pay it, laid siege to their city, but was unable to take the place.

The site was situated nearly in the middle of the western coast of the island, at the foot of a lofty mountain. Its citadel strongly fortified by nature is mentioned by Livy. It had no harbour of its own, but it was situated near one, called Gaurion (Γαύριον) by Xenophon, and Gaureleon by Livy, and which still bears the ancient name of Gavrio.

The site is located at Palaiopolis, where extensive ruins of the ancient city are to be found. Among other artefacts discovered there, were inscriptions, including an interesting hymn to Isis in hexameter verse. The town and its territory were celebrated for its wine in antiquity, and the whole island was regarded as sacred to Dionysus. There was a tradition that, during the festival of this god, a fountain flowed with wine.
