= Palaiopoli, Andros =

Ancient city on Andros, Cyclades Islands, Greece

Palaiopoli Παλαιόπολη
- Community
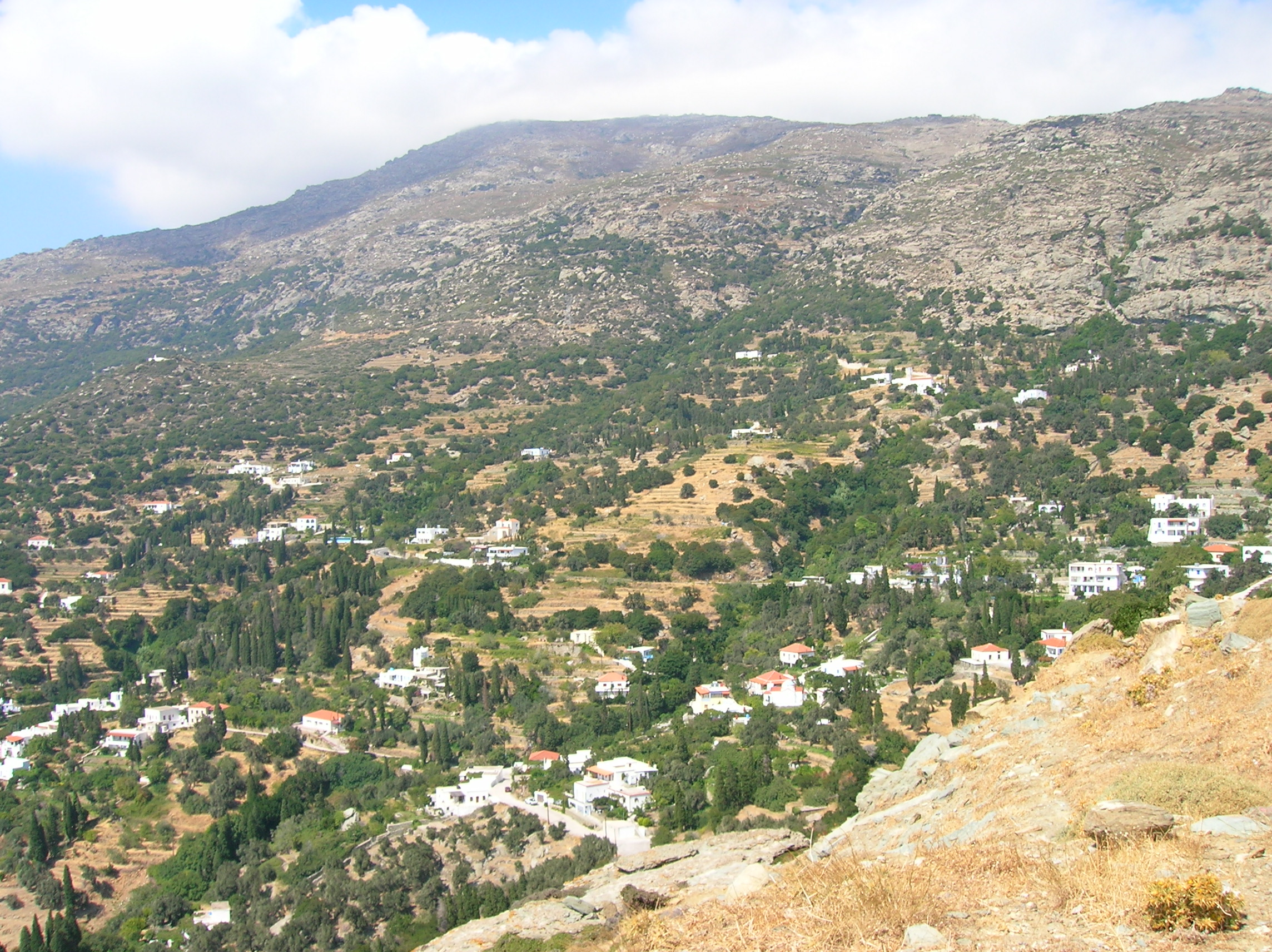

- Location within Greece
- Coordinates: 37°49′10″N 24°49′55″E
- Country: Greece
- Administrative region: South Aegean
- Regional unit: Andros
- Municipality: Andros
- Municipal unit: Ydrousa

Population (2021)
  - Community: 148
- Time zone: UTC+2 (EET)
  - Summer (DST): UTC+3 (EEST)

Palaiopoli (Greek: Παλαιόπολη 'old city') is an ancient city on the west coast of Andros in the Cyclades Islands, Greece, and was the capital of Andros, during the Classical period.

From the archaic to the first Byzantine period, the center of the island's activities is traced to the area of Paleopolis, which is found on the west side of the island, at a distance of 5 kilometers from Ipsili and 10 kilometers from Zagora. The ceramic findings, which were gathered from the area, are dated back to the Mycenean period, though some areas show signs of inhabitation during the Geometric period. Important findings of the area, the Kore of Copenhagen, a kouros, and a statue group of Pegasus and Bellerophon, which date back to the 6th century BC, show that the city was prosperous during the Archaic period. Construction in the area, according to the most recent findings, began during the beginning of the 5th century BC and continued through the old Christian times.

The area of the city is evident from the fortifications that are still visible along its length. The center of Paleopolis (or Agora) was to the east, near the port whose remains are still evident today, submerged in the sea. Cemeteries are located on the outskirts of town, to the east and west. From the remains, the many sculptures and written sources, one can see that the city was well fortified and had a marketplace, theatre, altars and temples.

The city continued throughout the 6th century AD, as it is evident from the remains of pre-Byzantine basilica churches found in the area.

The site was surveyed briefly by the British antiquary Theodore Bent in early 1884.

== Archaeological Museum of Palaiopolis ==
In 2003, the Archaeological Museum of Palaiopolis opened in a building that was donated by the Basil and Elise Goulandris Foundation. The museum houses the archaeological finds from excavations in the area, and it is organized into three thematic units: sculpture, inscriptions, and miscellaneous finds. The most important objects in the museum include a sculpture of Pegasus from 6th–5th century BC, a funerary statue of a lion from the 4th century BC, and a portion of an inscribed marble slab containing a hymn to the goddess Isis.
