= Andros Maritime Museum =

- Ναυτικό Μουσείο Άνδρου
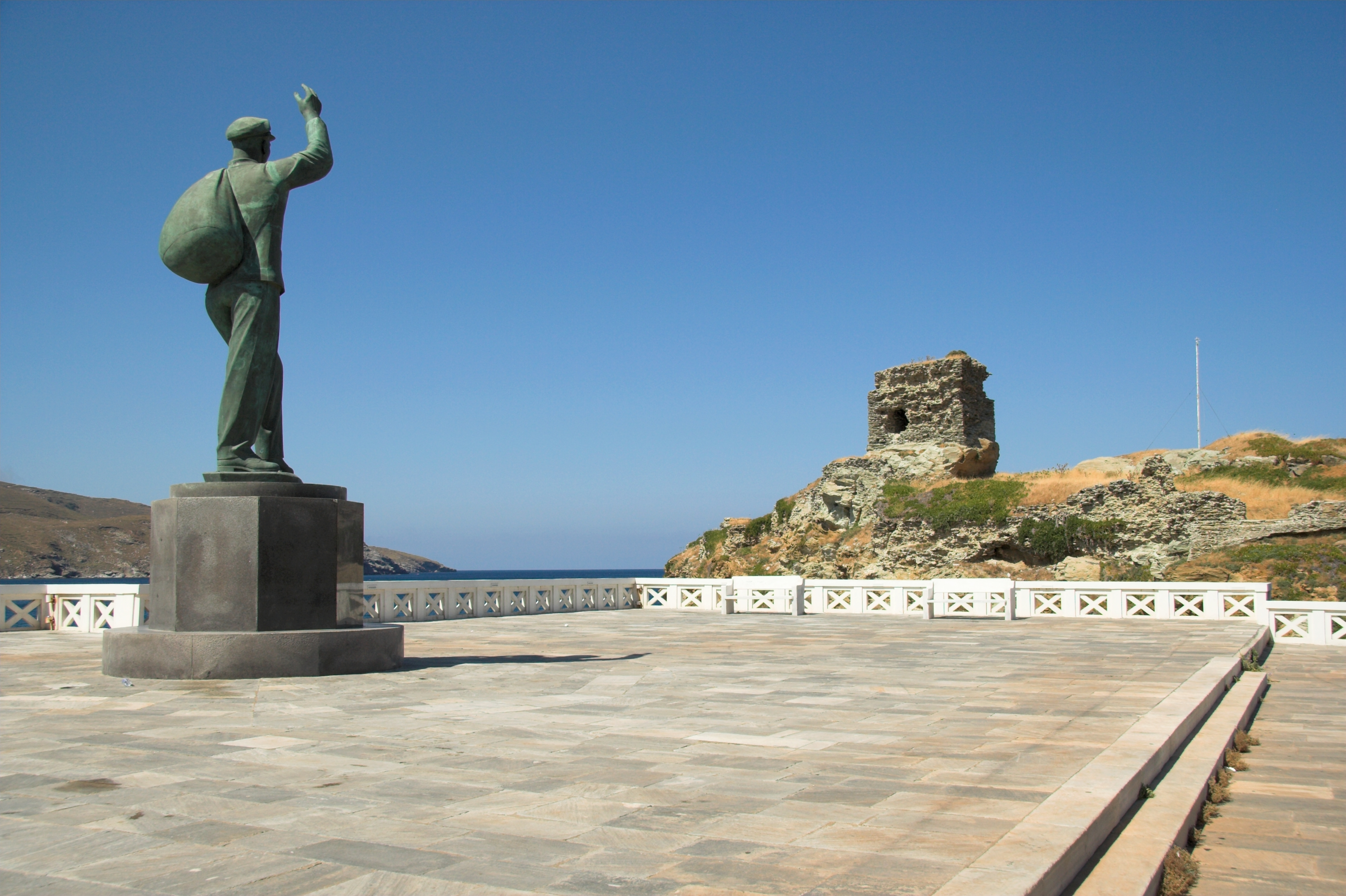
- Monument in front of the museum
- Established: 1972
- Location: Andros, Greece
- Coordinates: 37.84007002942001°N 24.942666770566063°E
- Type: Maritime museum
- Website: via odysseus.culture.gr

Andros Maritime Museum (Greek: Ναυτικό Μουσείο Άνδρου) is a museum in Andros, Greece. It was founded in 1972 for the purpose of gathering and preserving naval objects found in Andros. The museum is established in an old building in the city of Andros that was given to municipality of Andros by Dimitrios Rallias.

== Exhibits ==
The objects that are exhibited are related to Andros' naval life. There are a lot of lithography presenting everyday life, insurance policies, cutlery, uniforms, naval diaries, where the life of the Andriots on the seas before the 1821 War of Independence is described. There are also displayed models of ships, ranging from old schooners to huge modern tankers.

These exhibits are original and vividly present the entire history of Andros' merchant marine, from antiquity to our day.
