= Korthio =

Korthio Κόρθιο
- Municipal unit
- Location within the Cyclades

- Location within Greece
- Coordinates: 37°46′N 24°56′E
- Country: Greece
- Administrative region: South Aegean
- Regional unit: Andros
- Municipality: Andros

Area
  - Municipal unit: 81.9 km^{2} (31.6 sq mi)

Population (2021)
  - Municipal unit: 1,706
  - Municipal unit density: 20.8/km^{2} (54.0/sq mi)
- Time zone: UTC+2 (EET)
  - Summer (DST): UTC+3 (EEST)
- Vehicle registration: EM

Korthio (Greek: Κόρθιο) is a former municipality on the island of Andros, in the Cyclades, Greece. Since the 2011 local government reform it is part of the municipality Andros, of which it is a municipal unit. Its population was 1,706 inhabitants at the 2021 census, and its land area is 81.918 km². It shares the island of Andros with the municipal units of Andros and Ydrousa.
