= Battle of Andros =

Battle of Andros may refer to one of the following battles fought on or near the Greek island of Andros, Greece:

- Battle of Andros (246 BC), between Ptolemaic Egypt and Antigonid Macedonia
- Battle of Andros (1696), between Venice and the Ottoman Empire
- Battle of Andros (1790), between the Greek privateer Lambros Katsonis and the Ottoman Empire
- Battle of Andros (1825), between the Greek revolutionary fleet and the Ottoman Empire
