= Archaeological Museum of Andros =

Museum in Andros, Greece

Coordinates: 37.8381°N 24.9394°E

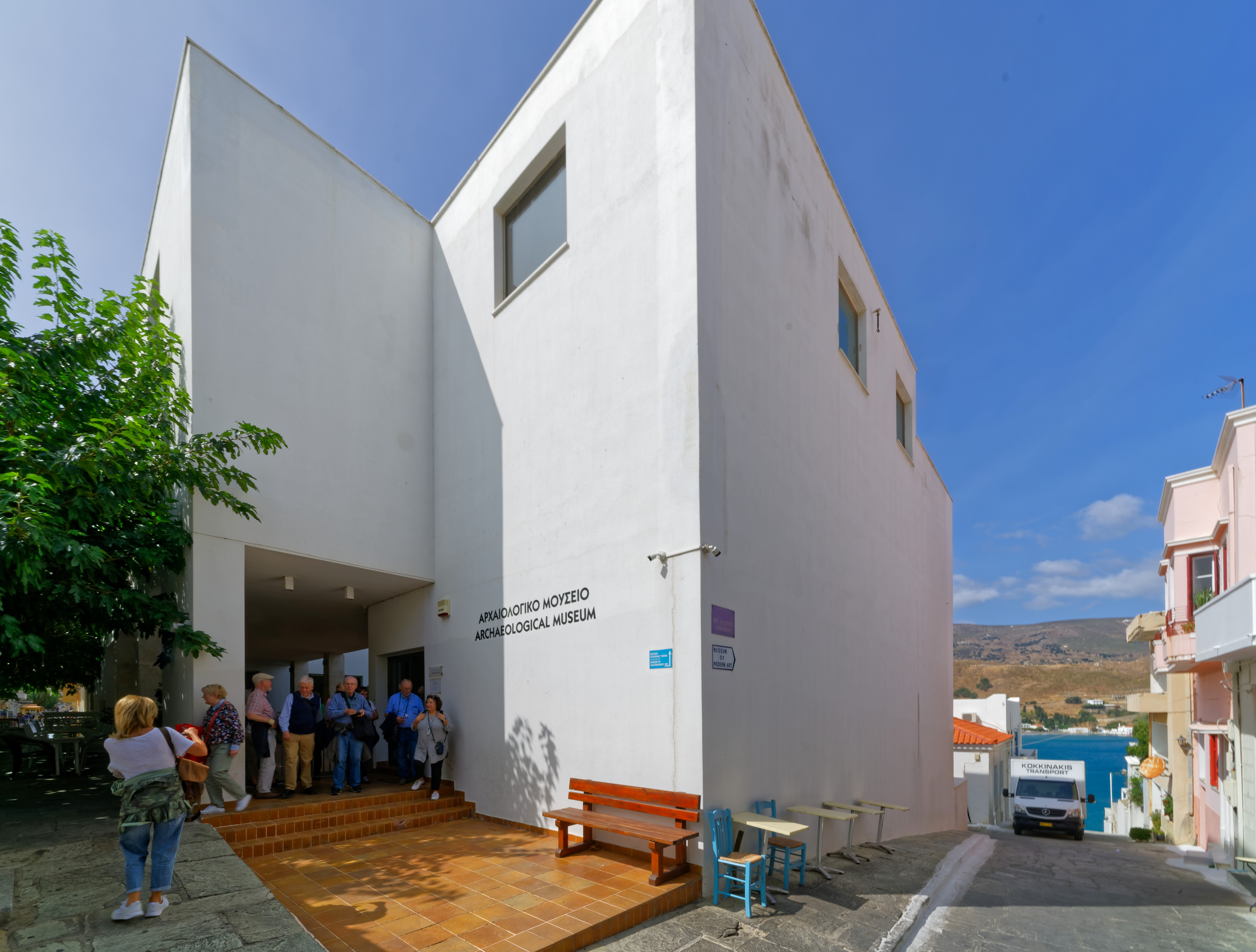
The museum building

The Archaeological Museum of Andros is a museum in Andros, Greece, established in 1981 following a donation from the Basil and Elisa Goulandris Foundation.

The building was designed by Stamo Papadaki.

The museum collections ranges from the Mycenaean era to the Roman period.

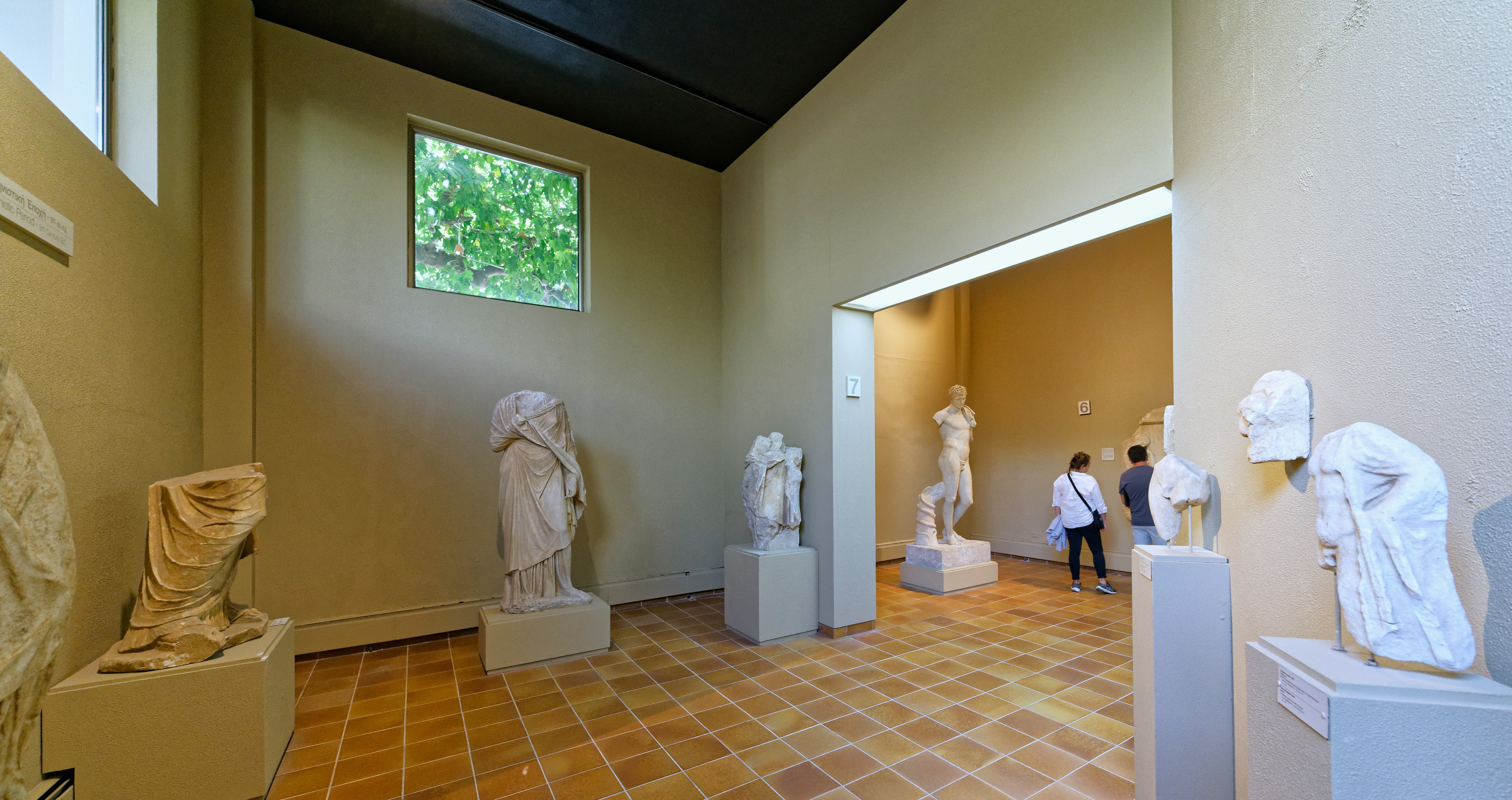
View into the museum.

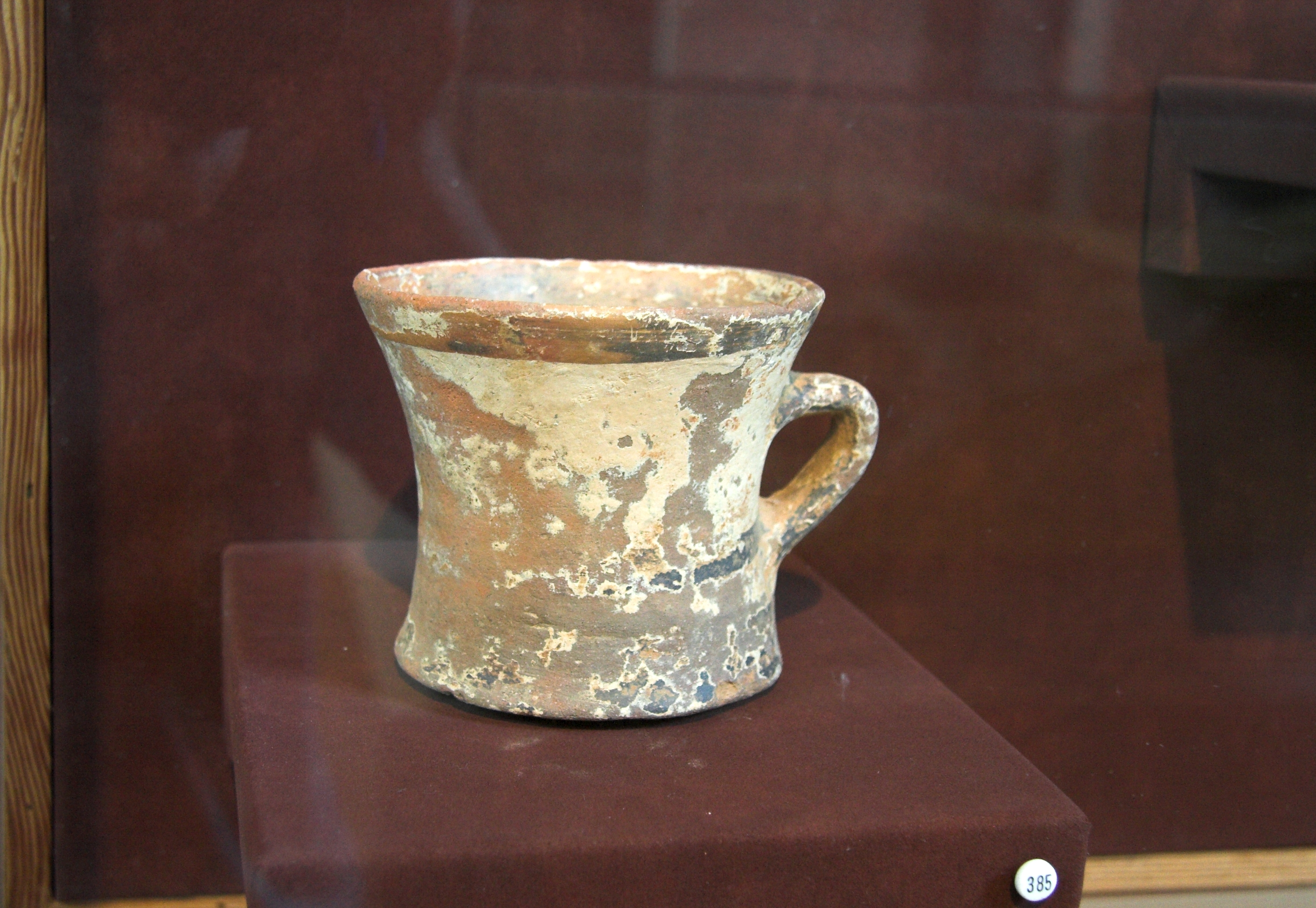
Mycenaean pottery, Palaiopolis, 1200-1150 BC

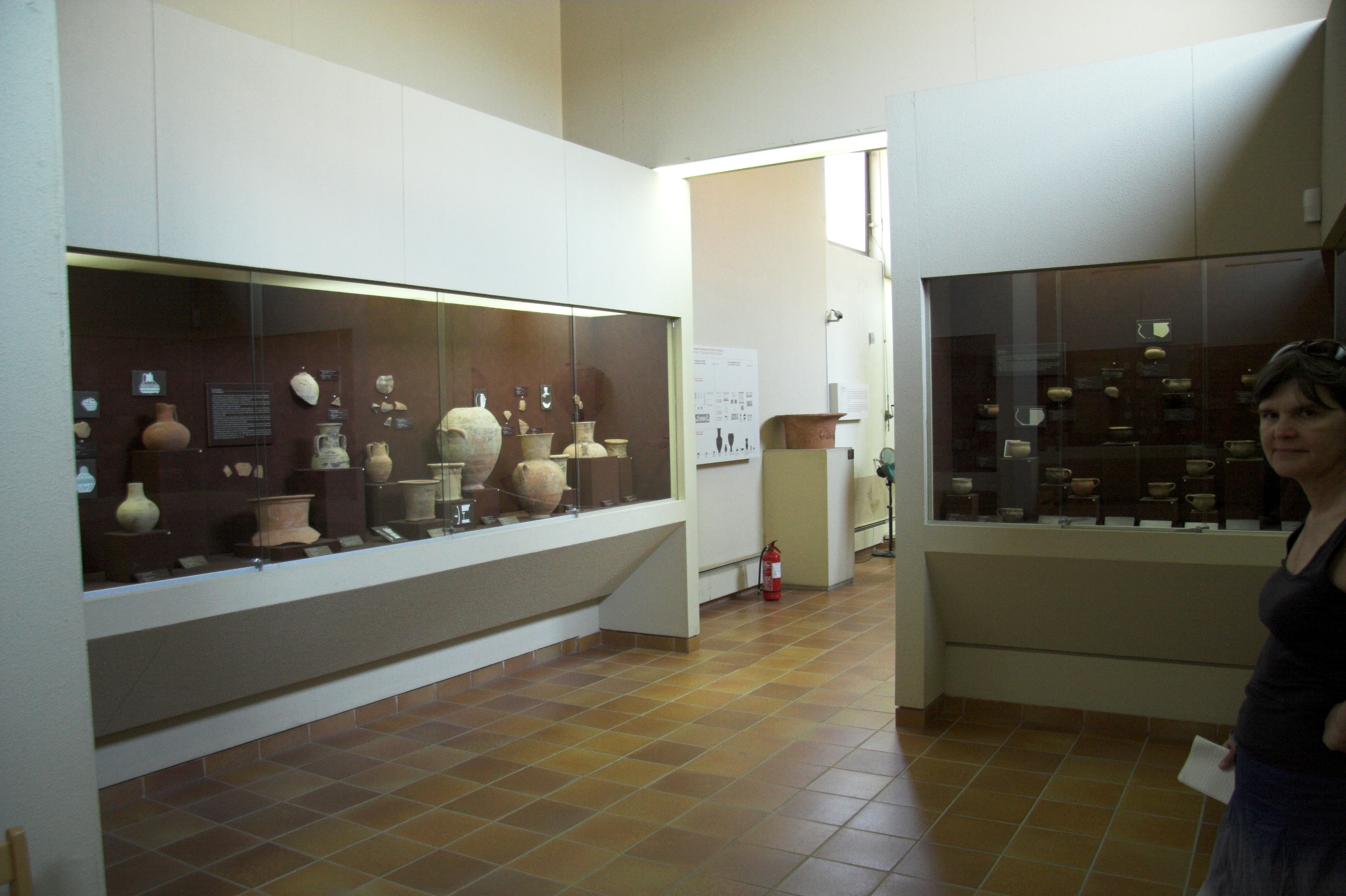
Rooms of geometric pottery

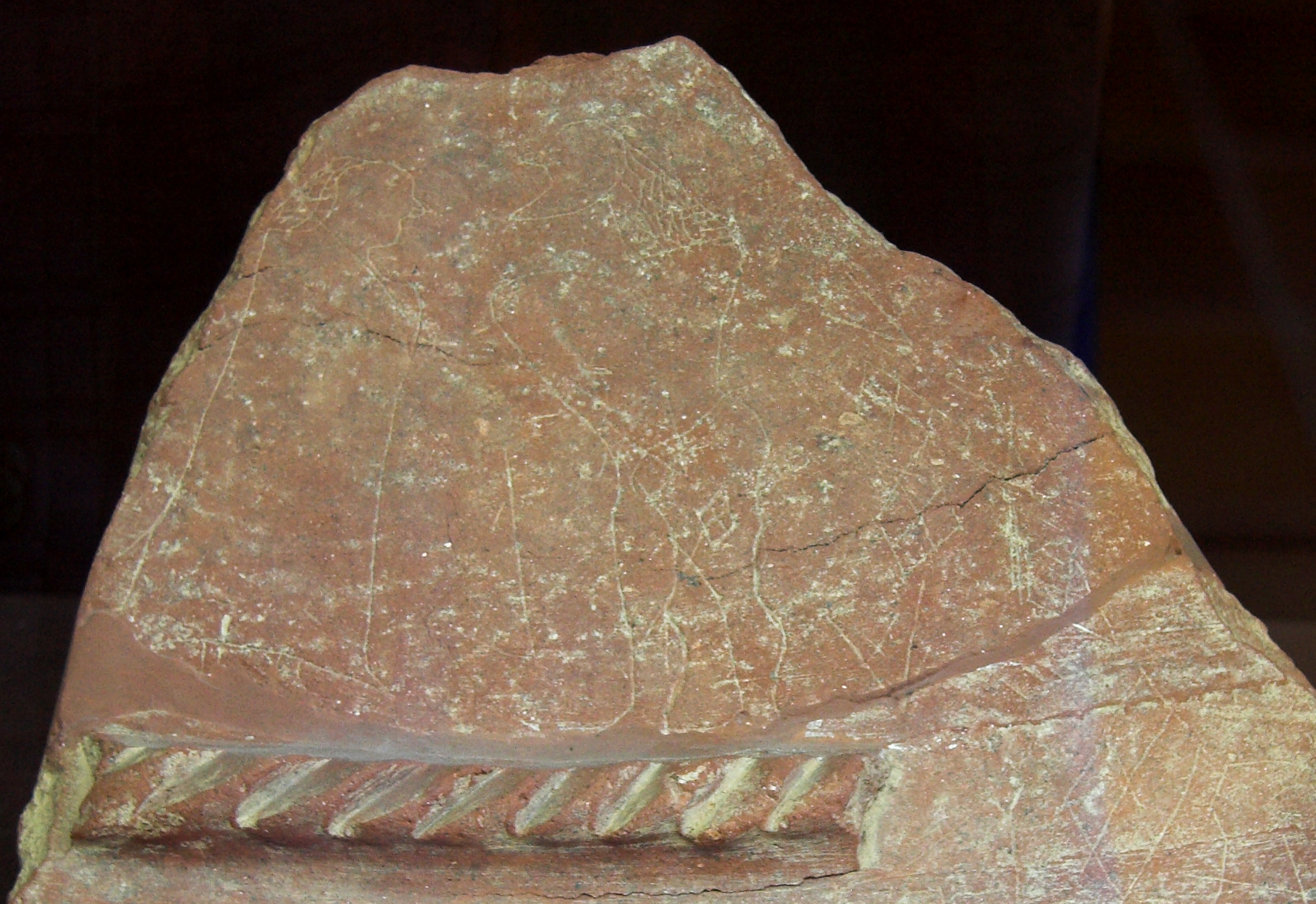
Fragment of geometric pottery with additionally drawing, Zagora

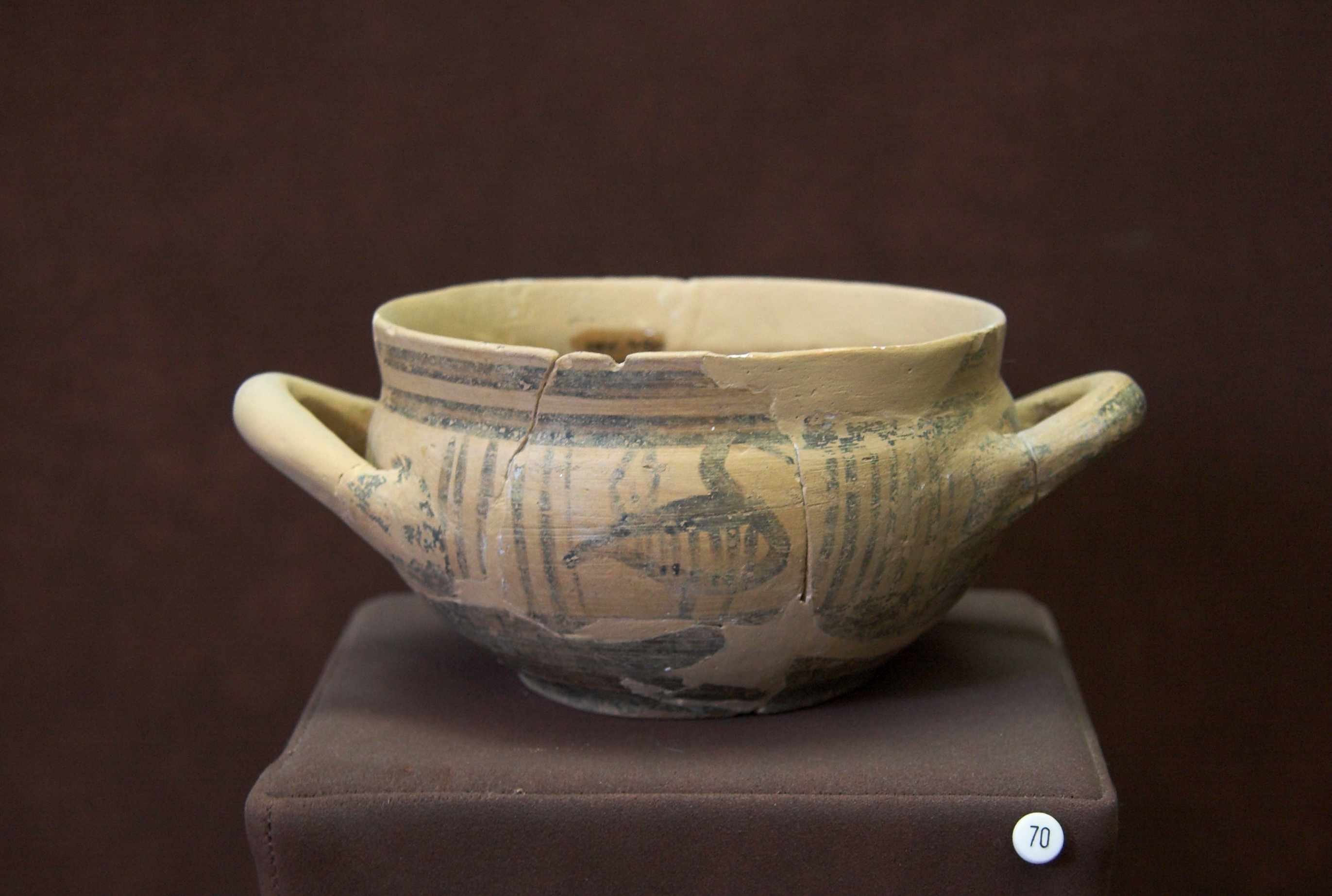
Geometric skyphos, Zagora, 750-700 BC

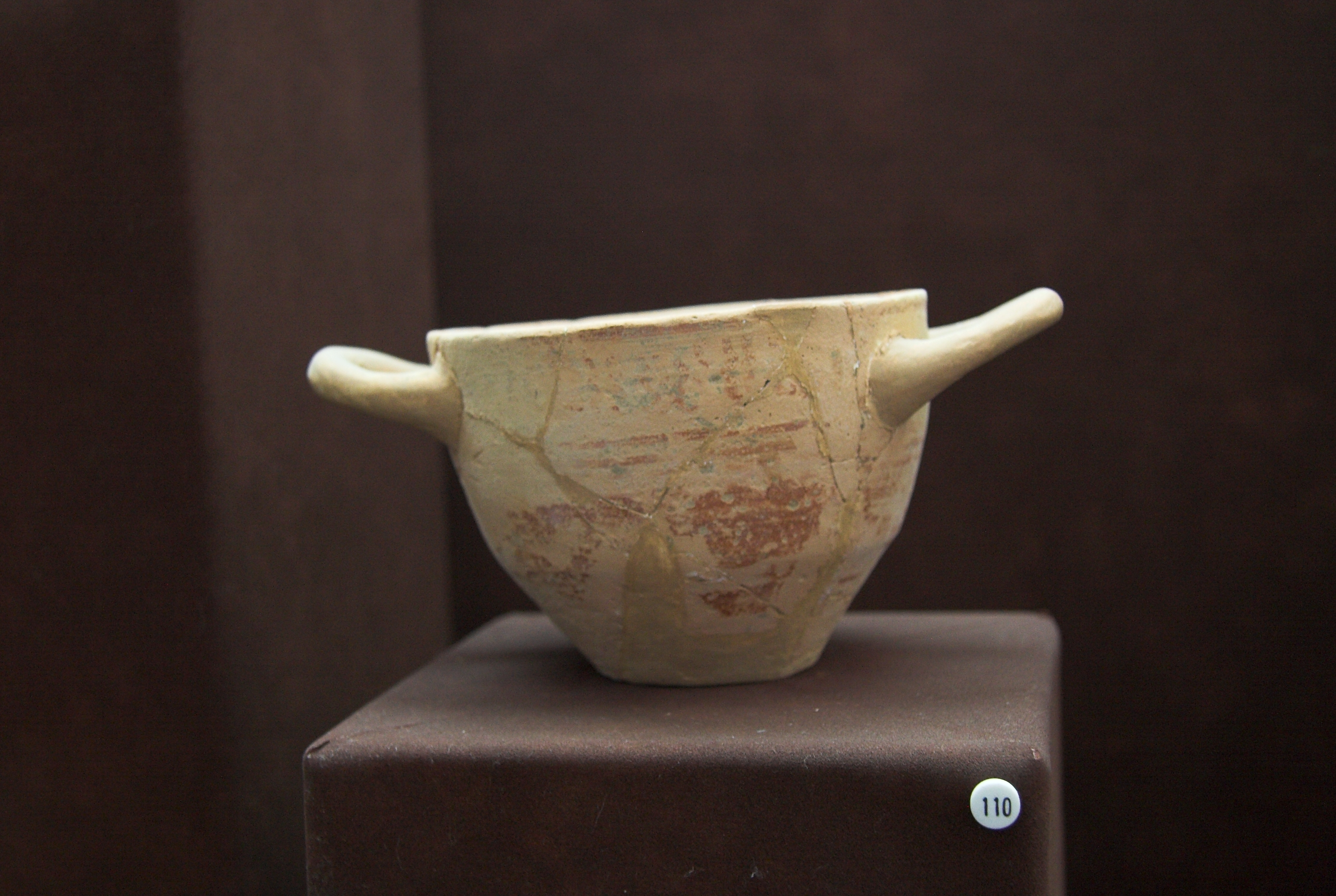
Geometric kotyle, Zagora, 750-690 BC

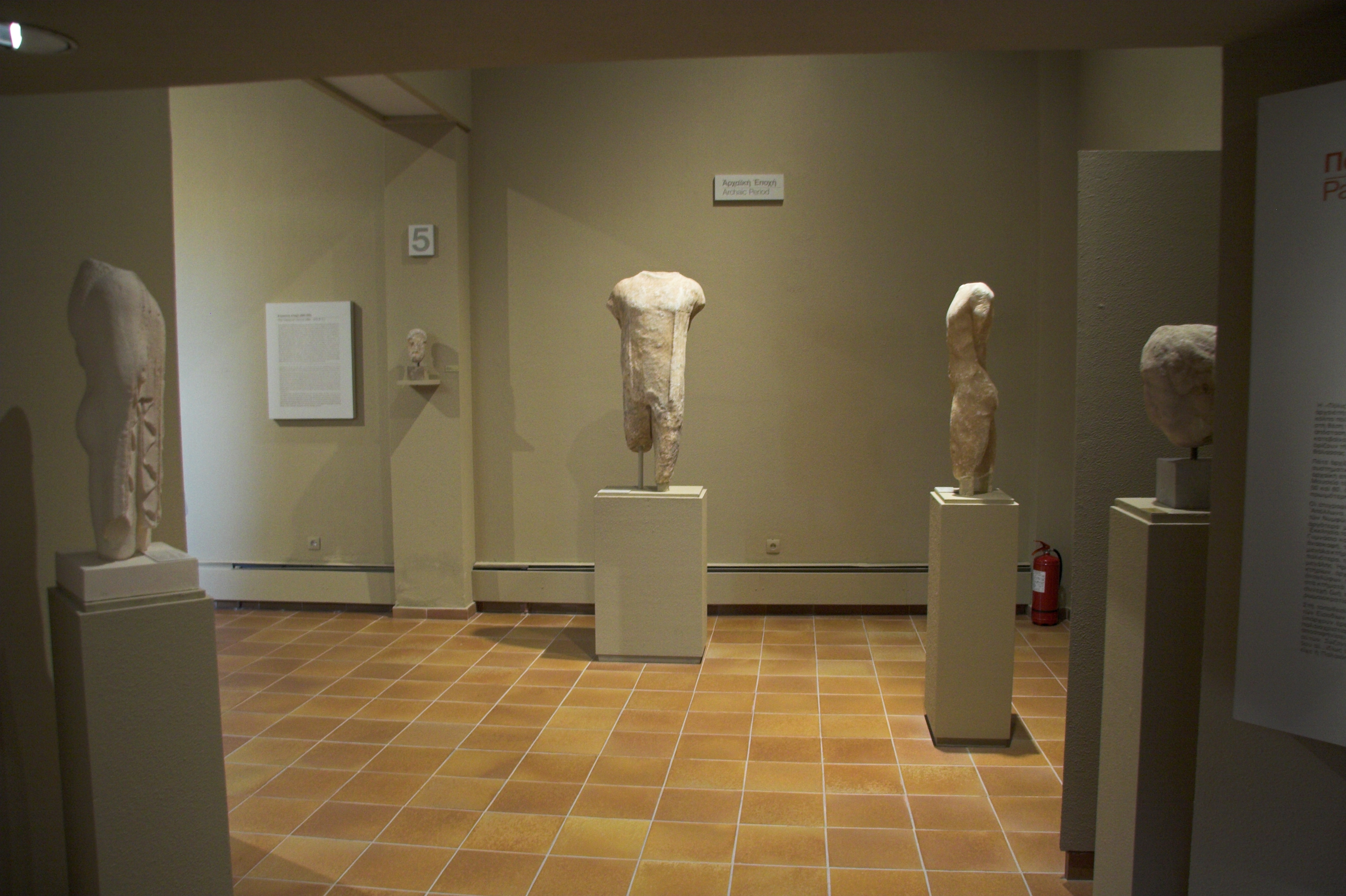
Room of archaic sculptures

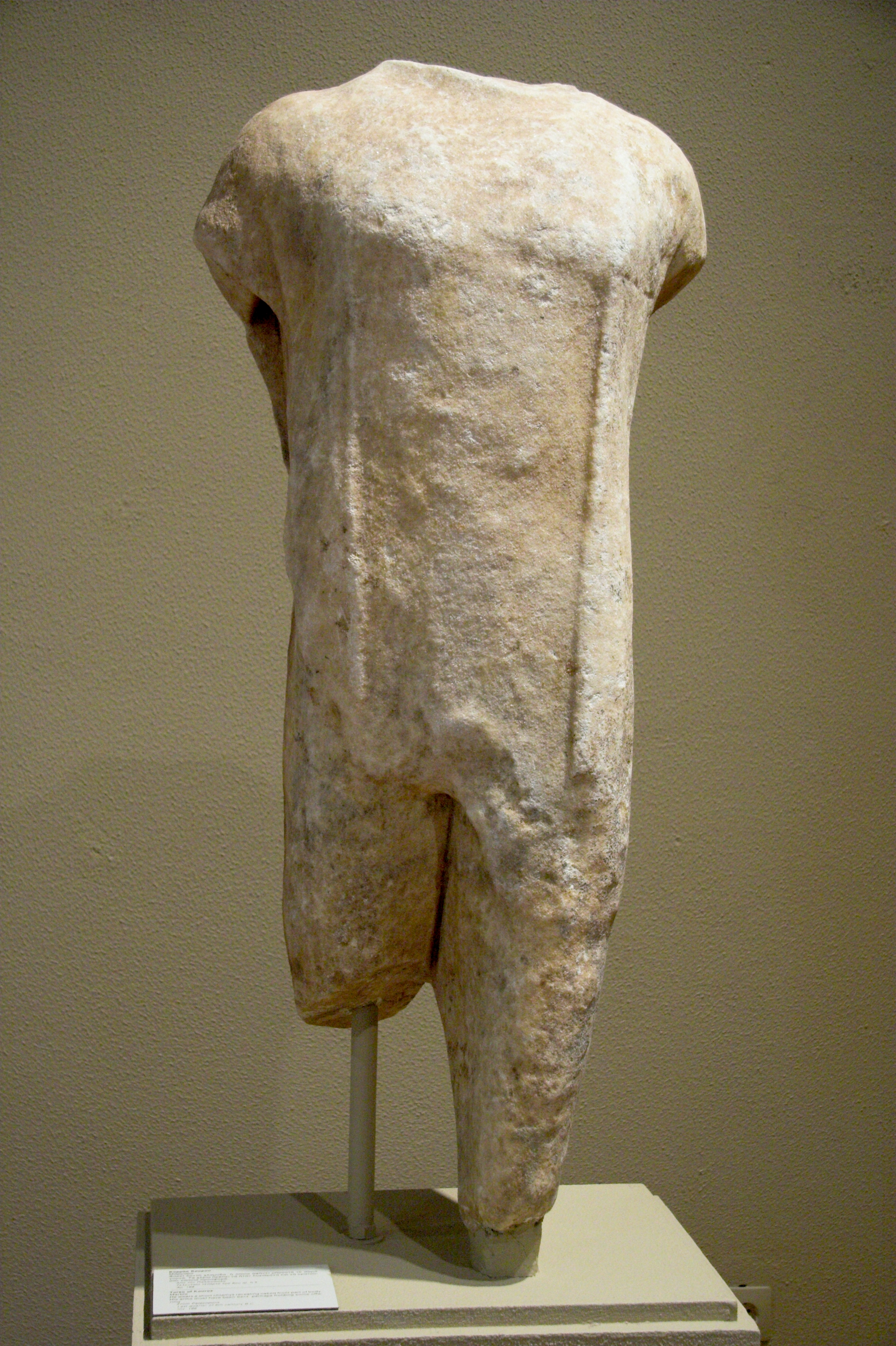
Kouros or sacrificer, marble, Parian influence, Palaiopolis, 575-500 BC

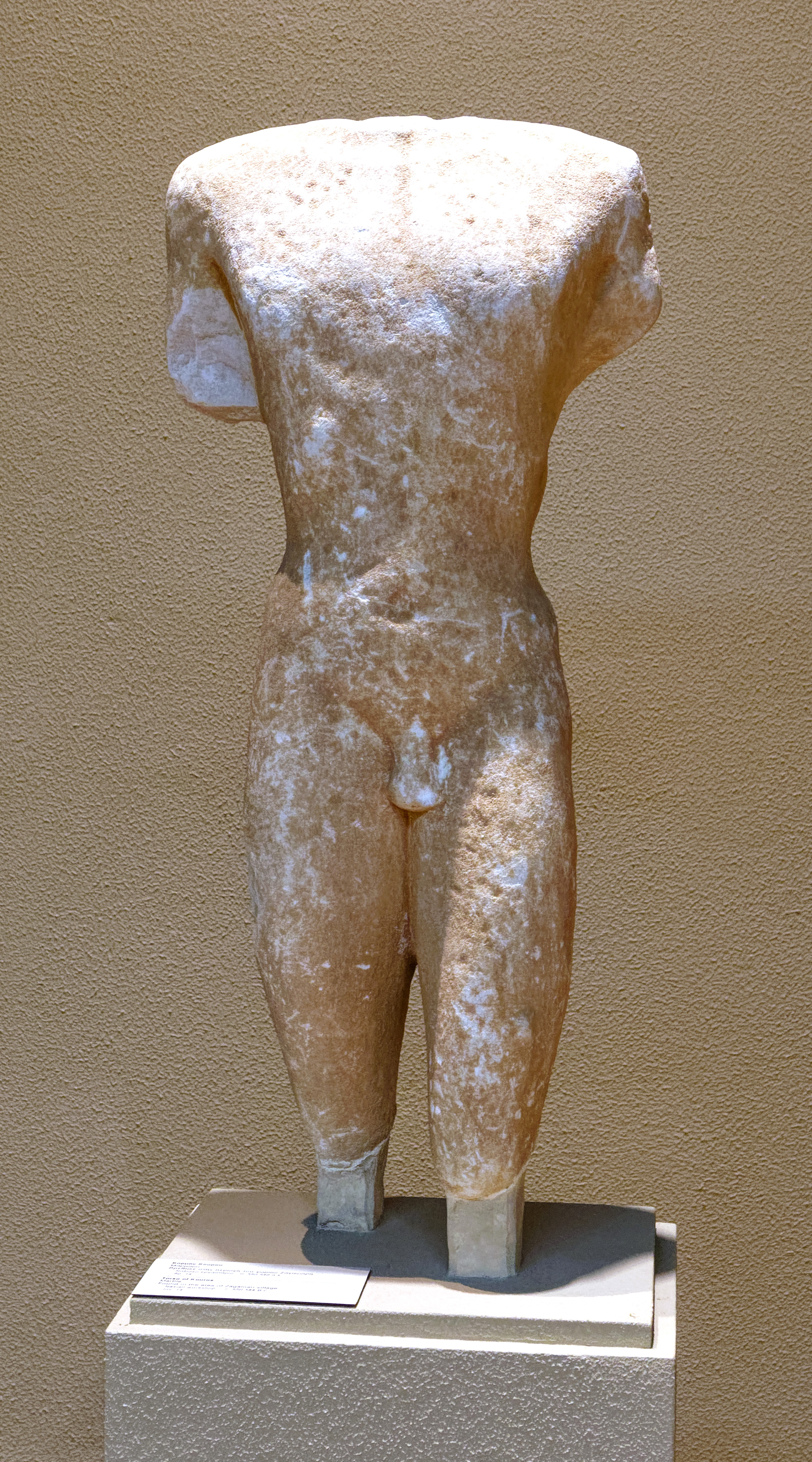
Kouros, marble, Zagariani, import from Naxos, 550-540 BC

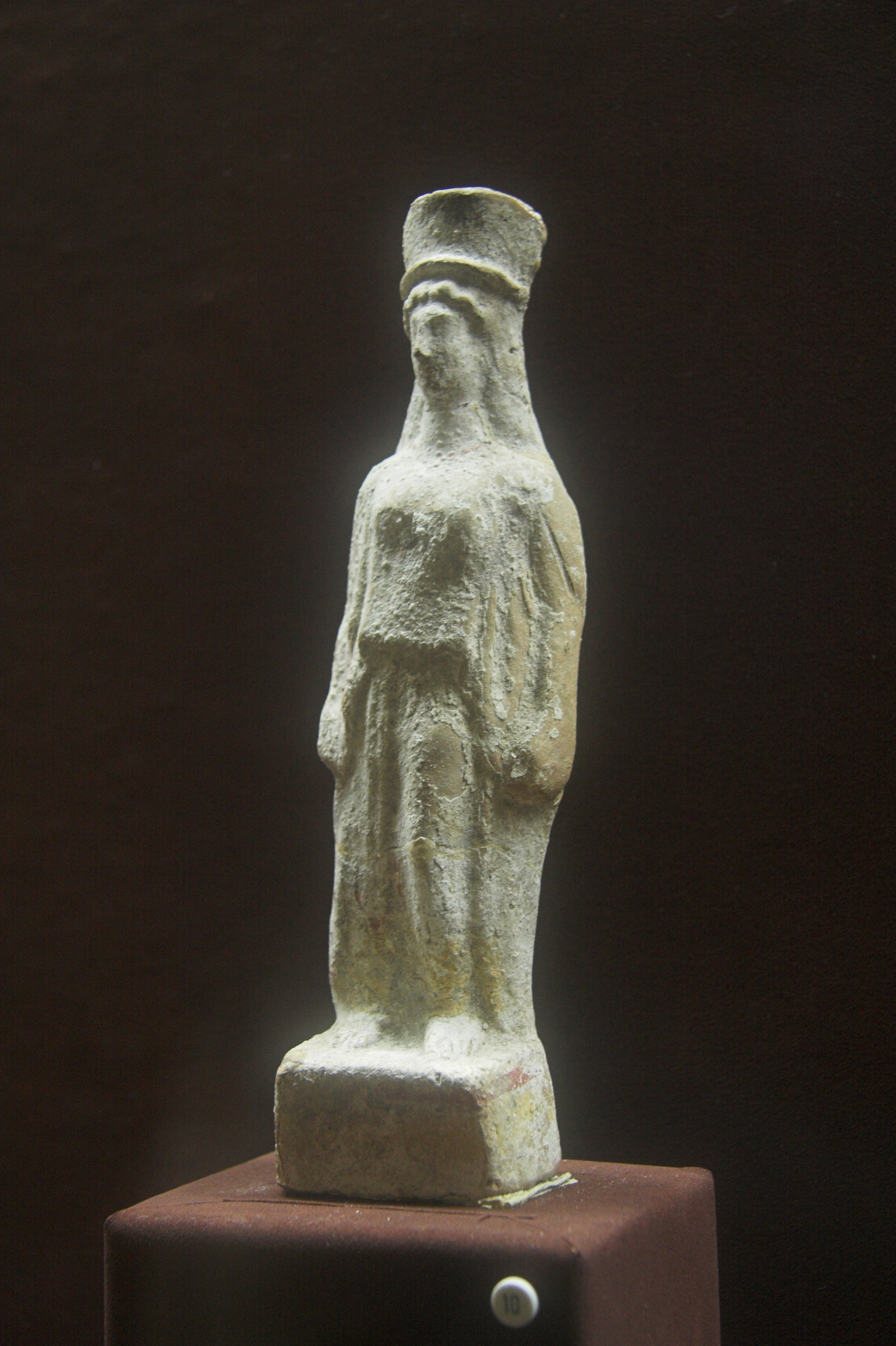
Female figurine, Kallivari at Gaurio, 5th century BC

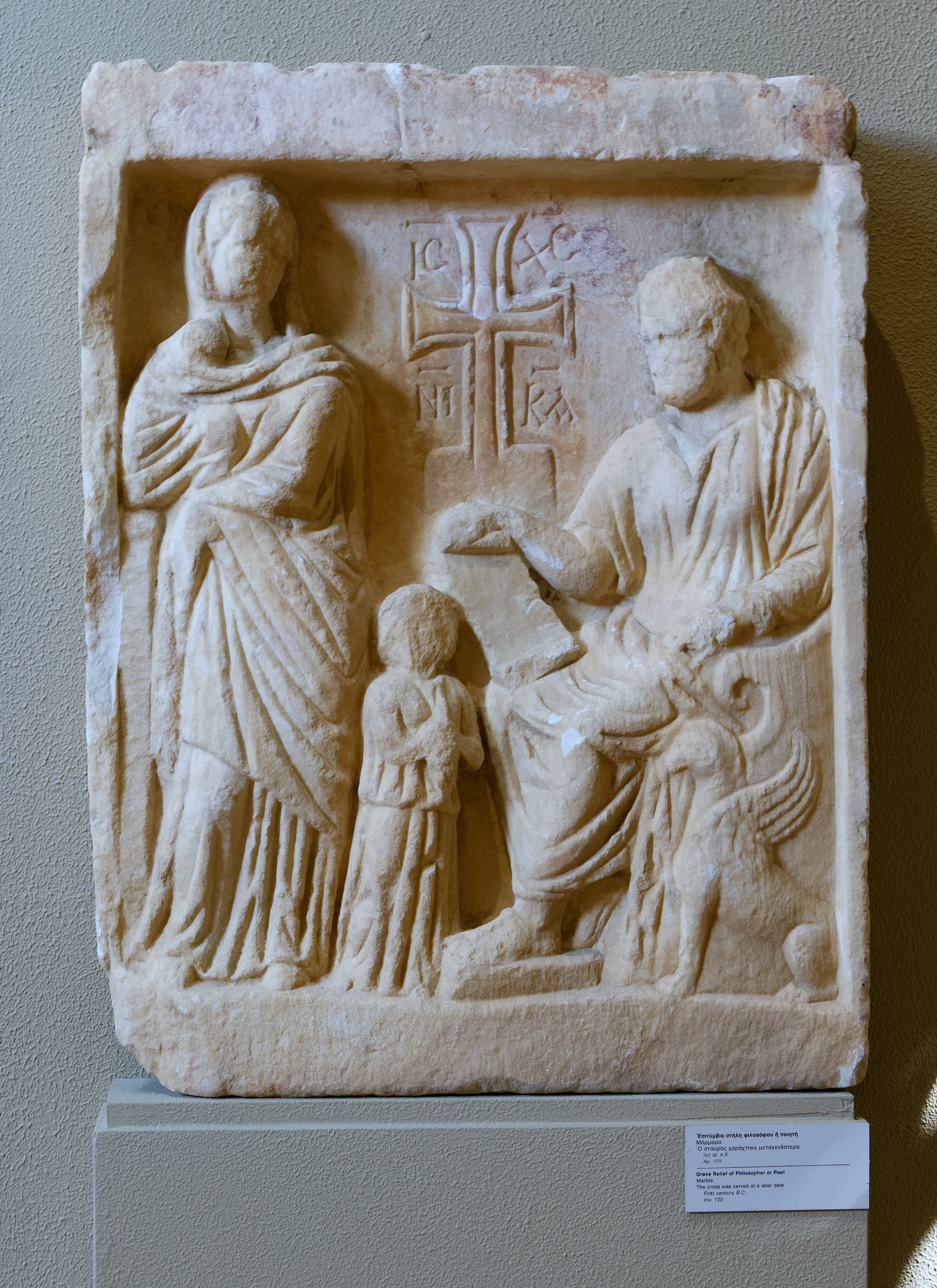
Funeral, 1st century BC, the cross was added later

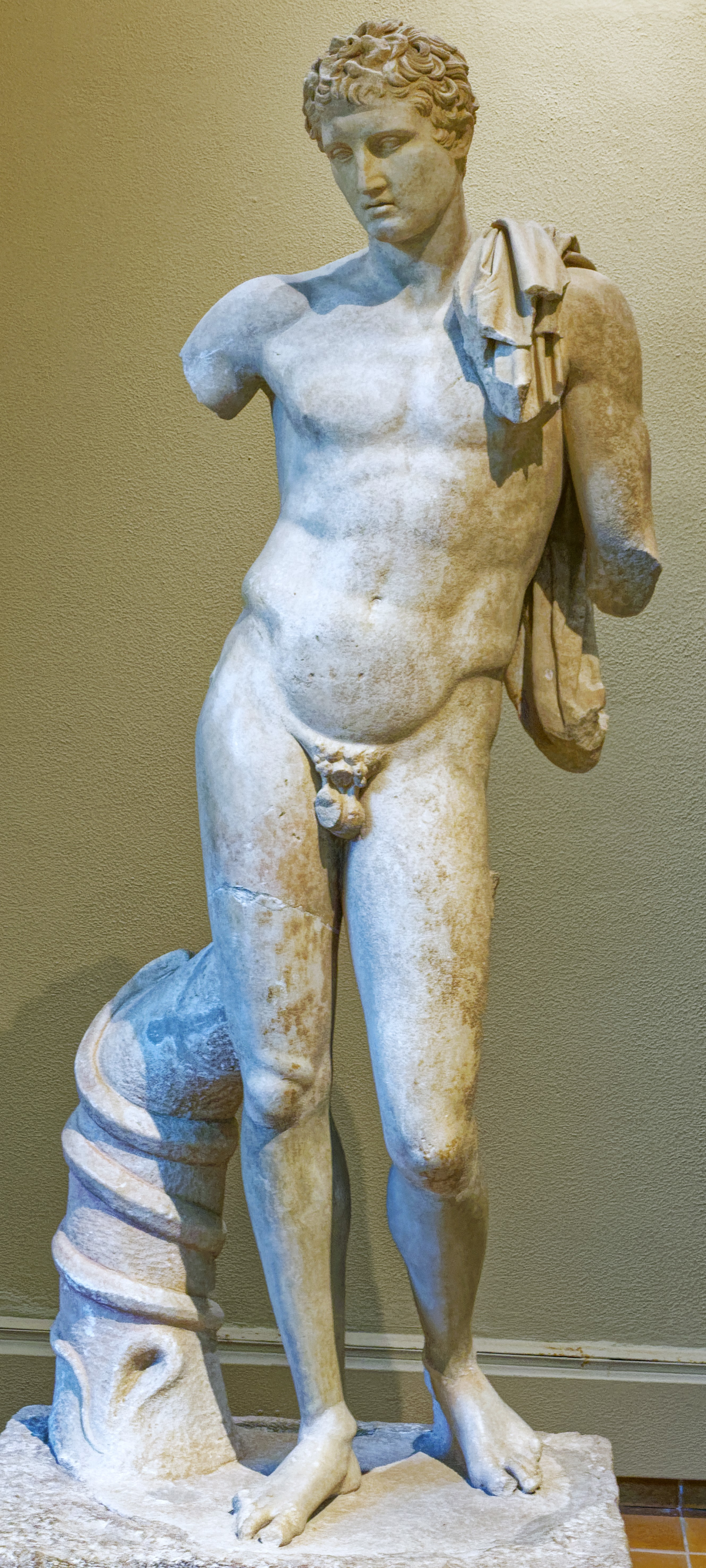
Hermes of Andros, Palaiopolis, first decade AD, Roman copy of a work of Praxiteles school

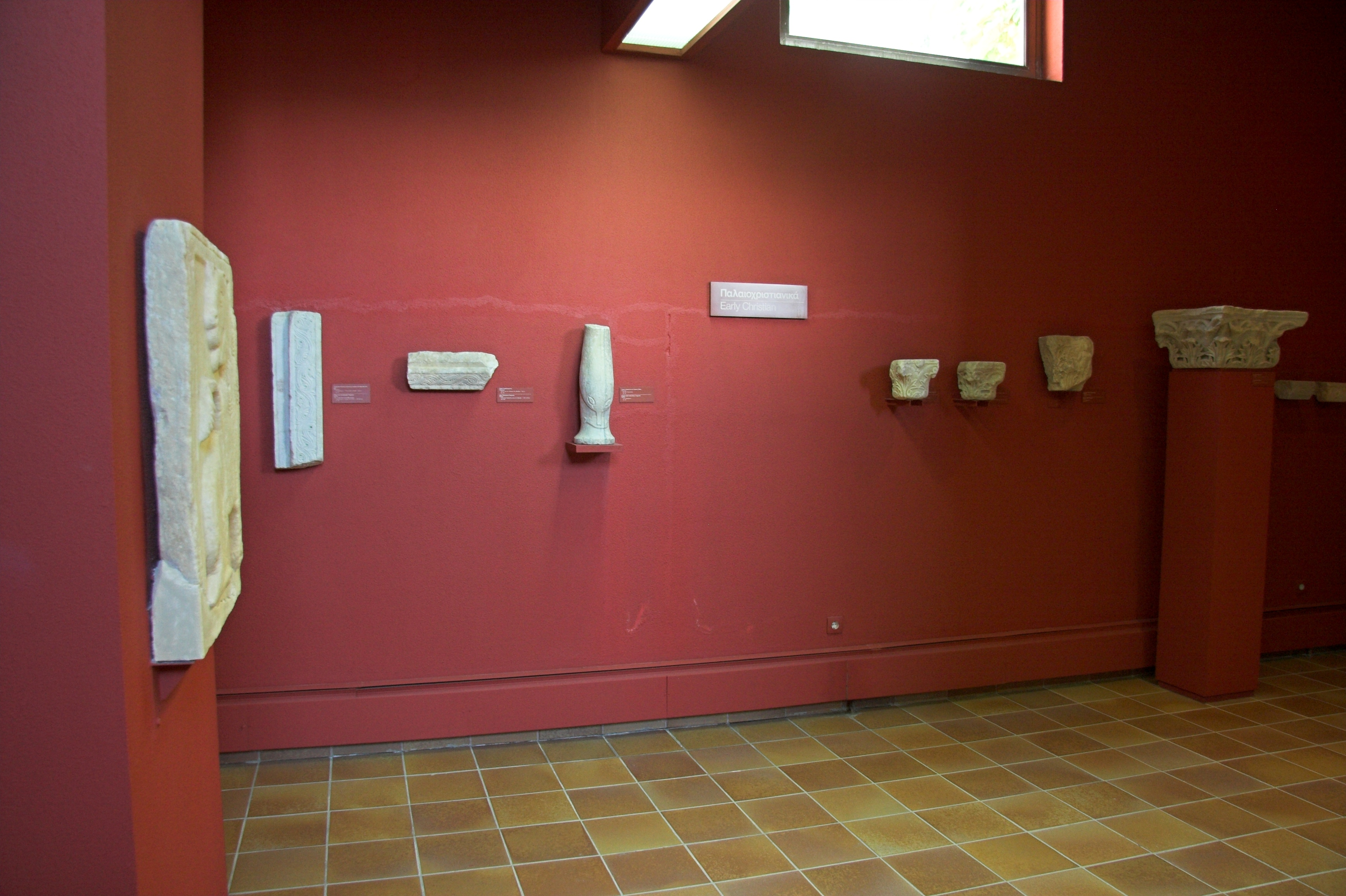
Room of Byzantine collection
