= Ydrousa =

Ydrousa Υδρούσα
- Municipal unit
- Location within the Cyclades

- Location within Greece
- Coordinates: 37°53′N 24°45′E
- Country: Greece
- Administrative region: South Aegean
- Regional unit: Andros
- Municipality: Andros

Area
  - Municipal unit: 195.4 km^{2} (75.4 sq mi)

Population (2021)
  - Municipal unit: 3,202
  - Municipal unit density: 16.39/km^{2} (42.44/sq mi)
- Time zone: UTC+2 (EET)
  - Summer (DST): UTC+3 (EEST)
- Vehicle registration: EM

Ydrousa (Greek: Υδρούσα) is a former municipality on the island of Andros, in the Cyclades, Greece. Since the 2011 local government reform it is part of the municipality Andros, of which it is a municipal unit. The population was 3,202 inhabitants at the 2021 census. It has a land area of 195.367 km^{2} and is the largest of the three municipal units on the island of Andros, covering over half of its territory. The seat of the municipality was in Gavrio. The municipal unit shares the island of Ándros with the municipal units of Andros (town) and Korthio.
