= Andros (town) =

Andros Άνδρος
- Municipal unit
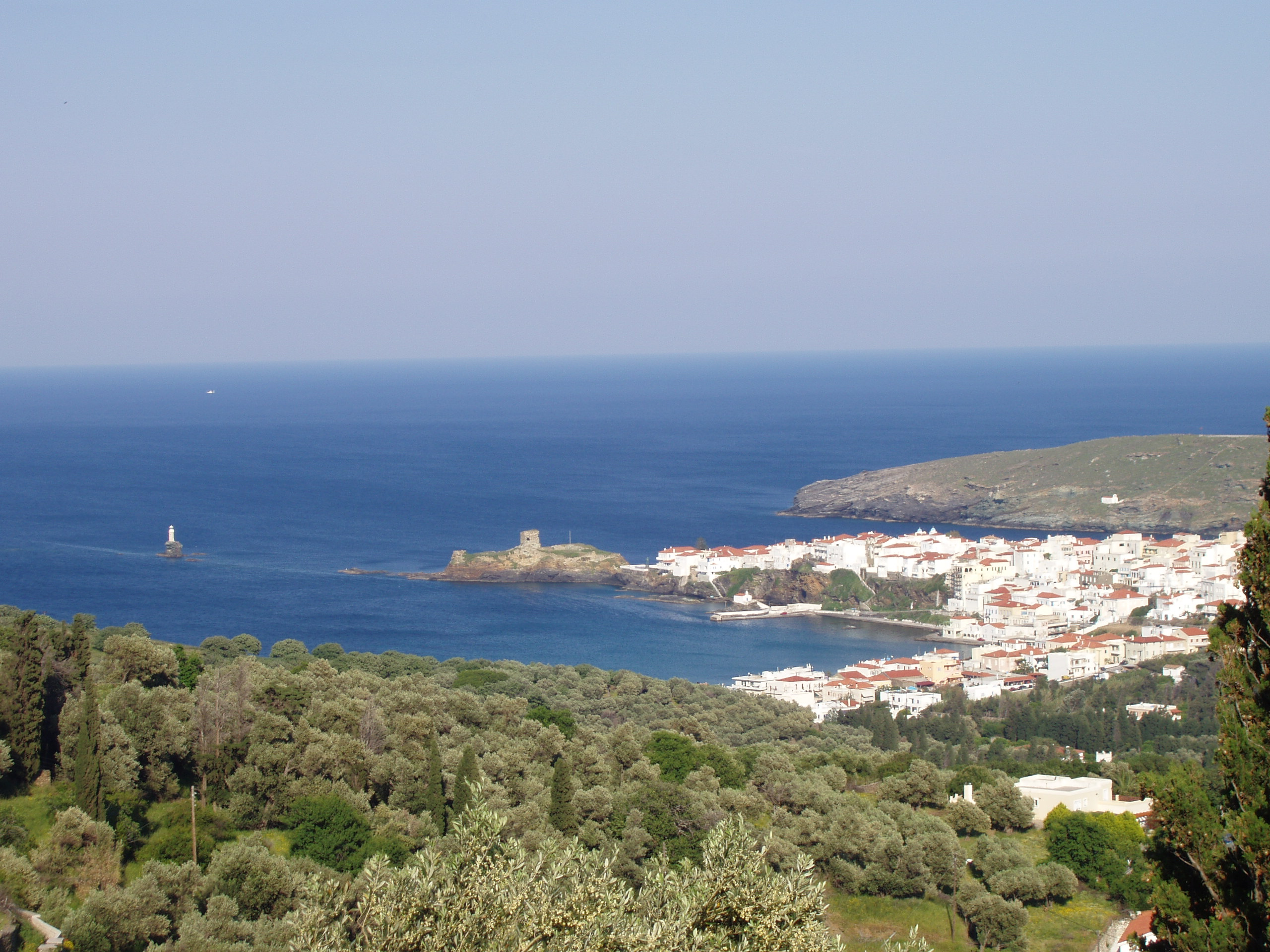
- Andros town

- Location within Andros

- Location within Greece
- Coordinates: 37°50′N 24°56′E
- Country: Greece
- Administrative region: South Aegean
- Regional unit: Andros
- Municipality: Andros

Area
  - Municipal unit: 102.8 km^{2} (39.7 sq mi)

Population (2021)
  - Municipal unit: 3,918
  - Municipal unit density: 38.11/km^{2} (98.71/sq mi)
  - Community: 1,774
- Time zone: UTC+2 (EET)
  - Summer (DST): UTC+3 (EEST)
- Vehicle registration: EM

Andros (Greek: Άνδρος), also called Chora (Χώρα, "main town"), is a town and a former municipality on the island of Andros, in the Cyclades, Greece. Since the 2011 local government reform it is part of the municipality Andros, of which it is a municipal unit, and shares the island of Andros with the municipal units of Korthio and Ydrousa. The municipal unit has an area of 102.756 km^{2}. Its population was 3,918 inhabitants at the 2021 census.

It has a mixture of post-World War I neoclassical mansions with vernacular Cycladic houses. The town squares are paved with marble. At the end of the headland are two islands. The first, linked to the mainland by a brick bridge, with a ruined Venetian castle and the second with a lighthouse. There are four museums: the extensive Archaeological Museum, Museum of Modern Art, a Nautical Museum and a Folklore Museum.
