= Gavrio =

Port town of the Cyclades

Gavrio Γαύριο
- Community
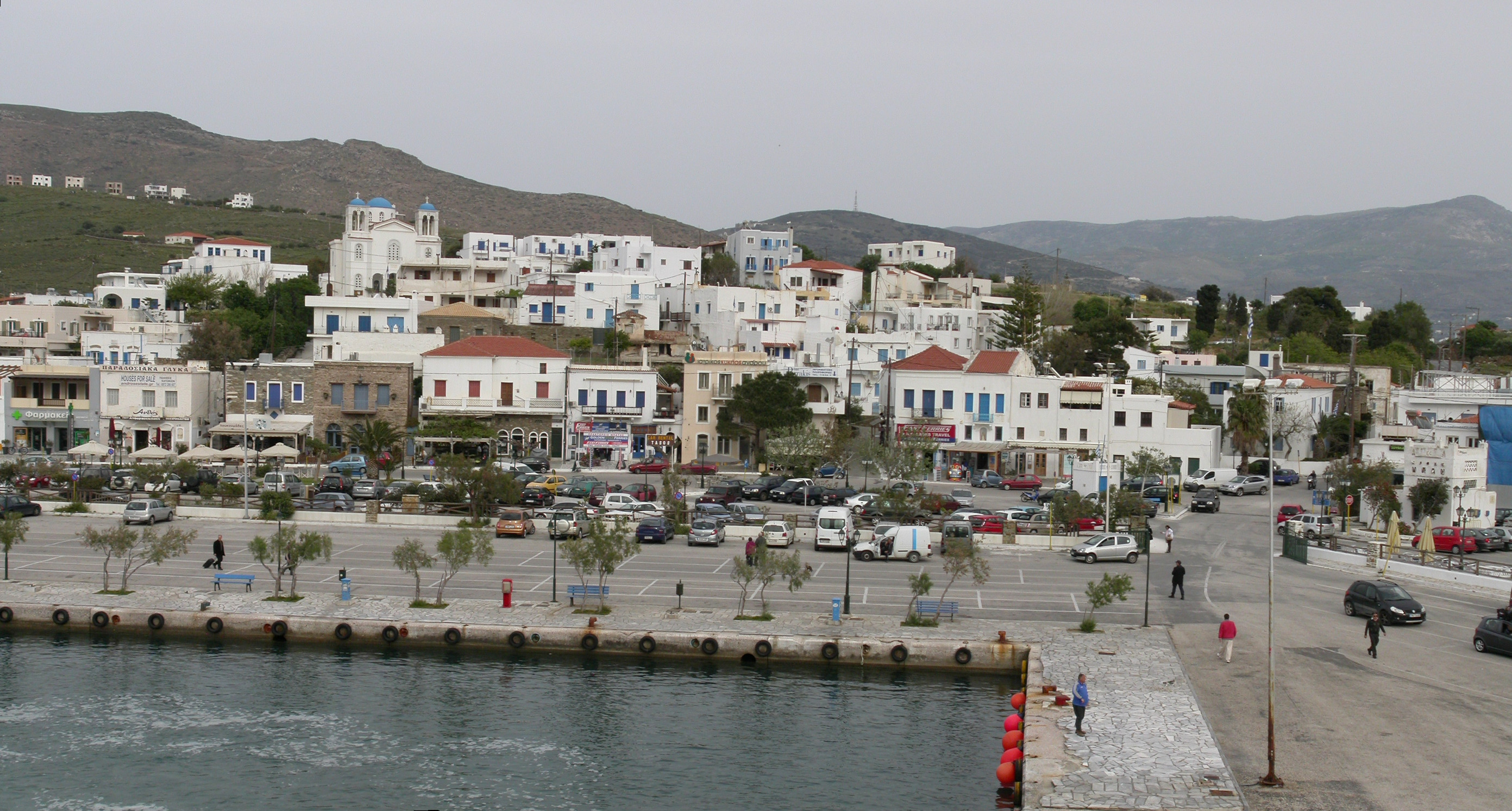

- Location within Greece
- Coordinates: 37°53′N 24°44′E
- Country: Greece
- Administrative region: South Aegean
- Regional unit: Andros
- Municipality: Andros
- Municipal unit: Ydrousa

Population (2021)
  - Community: 1,041
- Time zone: UTC+2 (EET)
  - Summer (DST): UTC+3 (EEST)

Gavrio (Greek: Γαύριο), Andros is the first port to the Cyclades. This traditional village, with ruins dating to the Hellenistic Period, is on the northwest side of Andros and 37 nautical miles (69 km) from the Attica port of Rafina (1–2 hours by ferry).
