= House of Crispo =

Crispo Κρίσπο
- Noble family
- Origin: Verona
- Founded: 1383
- Founder: Francesco I Crispo
- Final ruler: Giacomo IV Crispo
- Historic seat: Naxos, Duchy of the Archipelago
- Deposition: 1564
- Cadet branches: Crispos of Malta

The House of Crispo was a Lombard noble family originally from Verona which grew to prominence ruling the Duchy of the Archipelago during the latter half of the Cyclades almost 400 years of Venetian rule, usurping the preexisting Sanudo.

== History ==
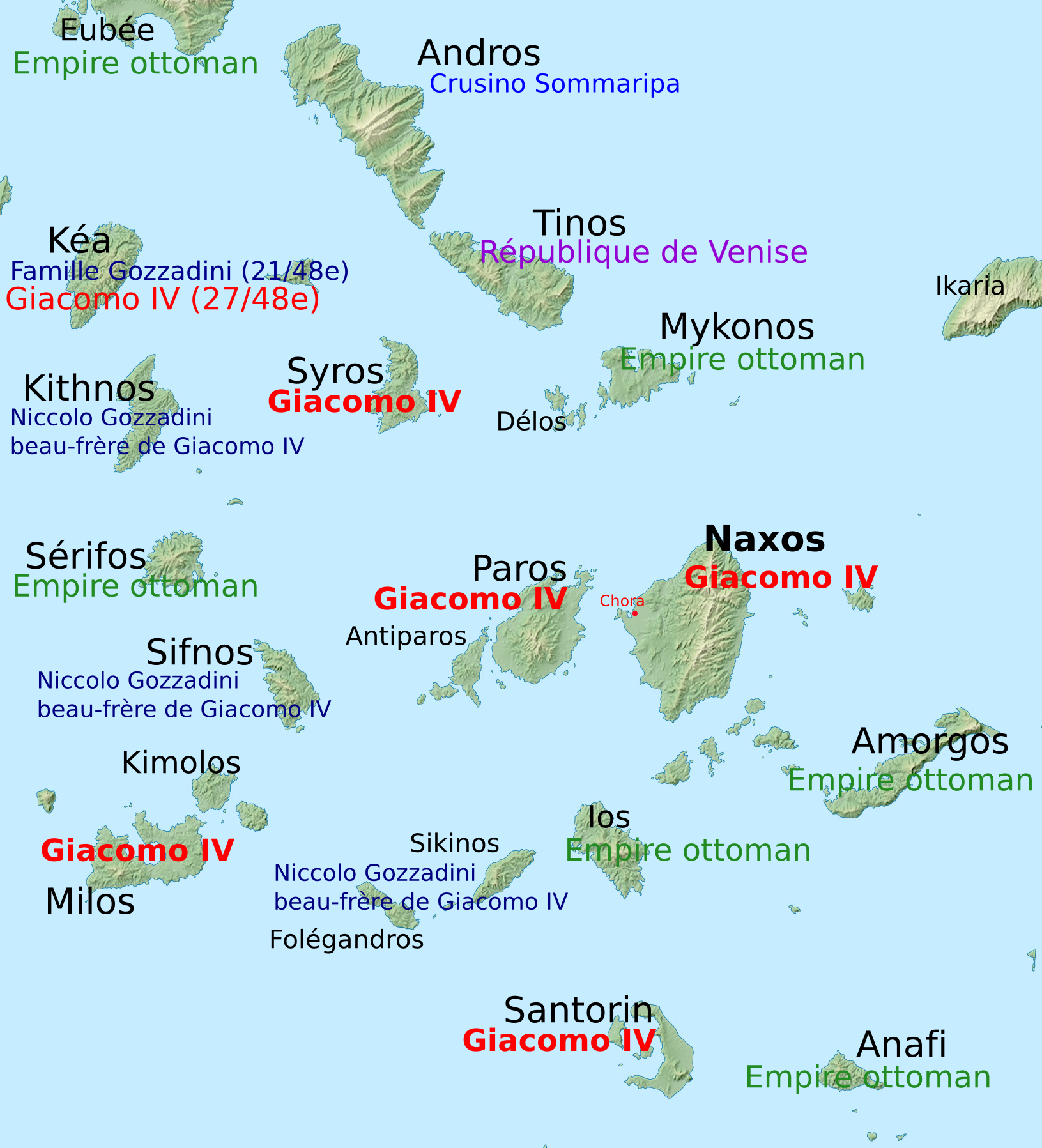
The extent of the Crispo holdings during the rule of Giacomo IV in red.

The Crispo originally hailed from the city of Verona, coming from Lombard stock. The family had settled on Ventian Negroponte, with its head, Francesco, being named Baron of Astrogidis. Francesco married Fiorenza Sanudo, the daughter of Marco Sanudo, Baron of Milos and she was the cousin to Nicholas III dalle Carceri, the Duke of the Archipelago. Nicholas had angered Venetian authorities by attempting a takeover of Negroponte, as well as angering his own subjects by increasing taxes. One day, while hunting with Francesco, Nicholas died under mysterious circumstances. Francesco then seized the castle of Naxos, with the native Naxans proclaiming him to be their new duke out of discontent with Nicholas's rule. Seeking a strong Duke to rule the increasingly threatened Cyclades and protect them from Ottoman incursions, Venice legitimized Francesco as Francesco I, Duke of the Archipelago, in 1383 and founding the House of Crispo.

Francesco I would be succeeded by his son Giacomo I after his death in 1397; however, Giacomo would only rule until 1418, dying of flux. In his will, Giacomo introduced salic law, meaning the throne passed over his daughter in favour of his brother John II. John II also died young in 1433, leaving his son and heir Giacomo II to inherit as a minor. He, too, would die prematurely without an heir and his son, Gian Giacomo Crispo, would be born six weeks after his death, resulting in a lengthy regency. His mother, Francesca Morosini, attempted to lead the regency council; however, she would be forced out by Niccolo of Syra and Santorin and William of Anaphe, who had the backing of Venice. He would die at the age of 6 or 7, potentially murdered by his aunt Adriana who, according to her marriage contract to Domenico Sommaripa, would have inherited the duchy in her own right, however, the late duke's cousin Francesco of Santorin, and grand-uncle William, both wanted to succeed themselves and contested the rights of Adriana by applying the Salic Law. Venice, seeking to avoid a civil war in the duchy which would have made it an easy target for the Ottomans, sided with William, crowning him William II

William II would sign a treaty with the Ottoman Empire to send an annual tribute in exchange for his lands being unmolested, however, had no legitimate sons, only siring the bastard Giacomo, so the duchy passed to his nephew Francesco II, as Francesco II's father Nicholas already died. Francesco II's reign lasted less than a year as he died of illness, leaving his infant son Giacomo III as duke under another regency, this time led by Giacomo III's mother Petronilla Bembo. During his reign, Naxos was occupied by the Ottomans during the Ottoman–Venetian War of 1463–1479, with most of the island's population being carried off as slaves. When Giacomo III died he only had one daughter, Fiorenza, so the throne passed to his brother John III, however, Fiorenza's husband, the ambitious Domenico Pisani attempted to take over the duchy, but failed when again Venice intervened and enforced salic law.

John III's rule was unpopular with the locals due to extreme taxation, leading to a massive peasant revolt by the Greek Orthodox locals against the Catholic Italian aristocracy, which required the Knights Hospitaller of Rhodes to send galleys to rescue John and put the revolt down. John III would be assassinated by poison in 1494, and due to the unrest, Venice took over direct control of the duchy, only restoring John's son Francesco III when he came of age in 1500. However, Francesco III suffered from insanity and was often called "The Mad Duke" he murdered his wife, Taddea Caterina Loredano, and attempted to kill his son. This again infuriated the peasantry, who rose up, this time backed by the house of Loredano, who overthrew Francesco III in 1511 with Antonio Loredano taking over temporary leadership until Francesco's son was crowned John IV in 1517.

John IV would rule for 47 years; however, he was constantly beset by both the Ottomans and their corsair allies. He would aid the Knights in the 1522 siege of Rhodes; however, he was unable to stop Hayreddin Barbarossa from landing a vast Ottoman force on Naxos in 1537. Barbarossa demanded John IV's surrender and swear suzerainty to the Ottoman sultan, which John agreed to, to spare Naxos from being looted and destroyed. John IV's surrender, while preserving the duchy, was immensity unpopular with both the Orthodox and Catholic populations of Naxos, with both religions leaders being banished from the island for opposing his rule. By 1563, a Venetian report described Naxos as the "shadow of a principality," kept alive only by the bribes John IV could muster for Turkish captains not to raid his lands for slaves. John attempted to groom his eldest son, Francesco, into being his co-ruler; however, Francesco predeceased John, who lived to 74, so the throne instead passed to his younger son, Giacomo IV in 1564. The Ottomans, however, had no need for Giacomo, the house of Crispo, or the old Venetian power structure in the Archipelago, only tolerating John's rule due to the constant flow of tribute and bribes. As such, the Ottomans deposed Giacomo IV after just two years in 1566, installing the Jewish administrator Joseph Nasi as the new "Ottoman representative" on Naxos, ending the 372-year-old duchy, as well as deposing the house of Crispo.

== Family Tree ==
House of Crispo

Duke of the Archipelago; Francesco I Crispo r. 1383-1397	Fiorenza Sanudo
Duke of the Archipelago; Giacomo I Crispo r. 1397-1418	Fiorenza Sommaripa	Count of Andros; Pietro Zeno r. 1384-1427	Petronilla Crispo	Agnese Crispo	Count of Nisyros; Dragonetto Clavelli r. 1386-1428	Duke of the Archipelago; John II Crispo r. 1418-1433	Francesca Morosini	Unknown Commoner	Duke of the Archipelago; William II Crispo r. 1453-1463	Elisabetta da Pesaro	Count of Syros; Nicholas Crispo r. 1420-1450	Eudoksia Valenza (Note: The identity of Nicholas' wife is still debated, with the most likely individual being the daughter of Jacopo Gattilusio, count of Lesbos, with other candidates being the daughter of John IV of Trebizond (a theory popular during the Renaissance but since disproved), the daughter of Alexios IV of Trebizond, or a common Genoese woman.)	Count of Ios; Marco I Crispo	Knight Hospitaller; Giovanni Crispo
Unknown daughter	Count of Andros; Andrea Zeno (Note: Inherited his father's title as a sickly child, last of his family's line, title passed to Crusino I Sommaripa upon his death.) r. 1427-1437	Unknown daughter	Nomen nescio	Giacomo Crispo	Fiorenza Crispo	Luigi Barbaro	Caterina Crispo	Count of Kythnos; Angelo I Gozzadini d. 1468/1476	Lucrezia Crispo	Leone Malipiero	Duke of the Archipelago; Francesco II Crispo r. 1463-1463	Petronilla Bembo	Petronilla Crispo	Jacopo Priuli	Fiorenza Crispo	Marco Cornaro	Valenza Crispo	Giovanni Loredan	Knight Hospitaller; Marco Crispo	Violante Crispo	Caterino Zeno	Count of Syros; Anthony Crispo r. 1463-1494	Conchita Rocca
Antonio Crispo	Nomen nescio	Duke of the Archipelago; Giacomo III Crispo r. 1463-1480	Caterina Gozzadini	Duke of the Archipelago; John III Crispo (Note: Allegedly had an affair with his cousin Maria Crispo) r. 1480-1494	Unknown Morosini woman	Giorgio Cornaro	Queen of Cyprus; Catherine Cornaro r. 1474-1489	King of Cyprus; James II Poitiers-Lusignan r. 1460/1464-1473	Illegitimate son	Maria Crispo	Antonio Nicholas Crispo (Note: Never inherited father's title, fled to Rhodes after his death. Family became minor barons within the lay Knights of Rhodes and later Knights of Malta.)	Taddea Sommaripa
William Crispo	Nomen nescio	Fiorenza Crispo	Count of Santorini; Domenico Pisani (Note: Awarded the county of Santorini in his dowery, attempted to wrestle the Duchy of the Archipelago for himself after the death of Giacomo III but Venice again intervened and enforced salic inheritance in favor of John III) r. 1480-1486	Duke of the Archipelago; Francesco III Crispo (Note: Went insane and murdered his wife, and attempted to murder his son, overthrown by the peasantry and his brother in law Antonio Loredan ruled until John IV was of age) r. 1500-1511	Taddea Caterina Loredan
Antonio Crispo	Unknown Gavalas woman	Duke of the Archipelago; John IV Crispo r. 1517-1564	Catherine Crispo	Count of Chios; Gianluigi Pisani
Adriana Crispo	Count of Andros; Domenico Sommaripa r. 1462-1466	Duke of the Archipelago; Giacomo II Crispo; 1433-1447	Ginevra Gattilusio	Caterina Crispo	Caterina Crispo	Count of Sifnos; Niccolo III Gozzadini	Francesco Crispo (Note: Heir apparent and co-ruler with his father, predeceased him in 1564)	Fiorenza Gozzadini	Duke of the Archipelago; Giacomo IV Crispo (Note: Last Duke of the Archipelago) r. 1564-1566	Cecilia Sommaripa	Thaddea Crispo	Count of Andros; Gian Francesco Sommaripa
Count of Andros; Giovanni Sommaripa r. 1466-1468	Count of Andros; Crusino II Sommaripa r. 1468-1500	Count of Andros; Francesco Sommaripa r. 1506-1506	Elisabetta Crispo	Count of Ainos; Dorino II Gattilusio r. 1455-1456	Duke of the Archipelago; Gian Giacomo Crispo (Note: Died at the age of 6 or 7, potentially murdered by his aunt Adriana so she could seize power, Venice intervened and enforced stringent salic law so title passed to his great Uncle William II.) r. 1447-1453

== Gallery ==
Coat of arms of Francesco I Crispo, the dynasty's founder

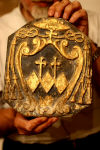
An example of the Crispo coat of arms

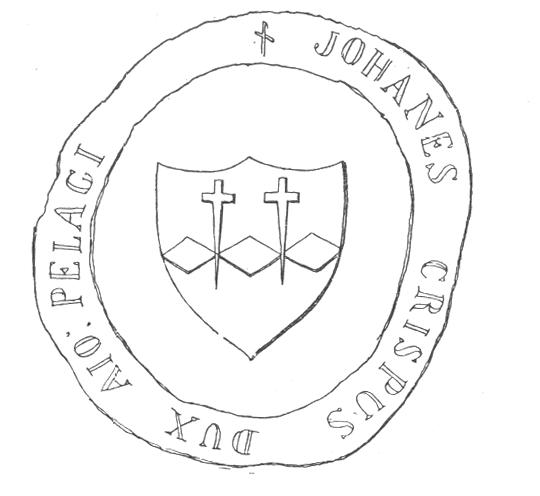
Seal of the penultimate Crispo duke John IV Crispo

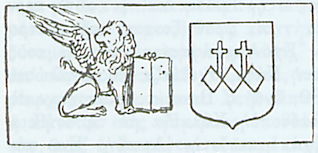
Sketch of the Crispo coat of arms, with the Lion of St. Mark, a sign of Venetian authority.

== Bibliography ==
- Babinger, Franz (1978). Hickman, William C. (ed.). Mehmed the Conqueror and his time. Translated by Manheim, Ralph. Princeton, N.J.: Princeton University Press. ISBN 978-0-691-09900-2. OCLC 3168859.
- Frazee, Charles A.; Frazee, Kathleen (1988). The island princes of Greece : the dukes of the archipelago. Amsterdam: A.M. Hakkert. ISBN 978-90-256-0948-1. OCLC 21782602.
- Miller, William (1908). The Latins in the Levant: A History of Frankish Greece (1204–1566). London: John Murray.
