= Crispo =

Crispo primarily refers to the House of Crispo.

== People ==
- Adriana Crispo (died 1537), noblewoman, lady of Ios, Therasia and Antiparos in the Cyclades, before the conquest of the Ottoman Empire
- Andrew Crispo (1945–2024), American art gallerist and convicted felon
- Anthony Crispo, Lord of Syros (1429/1430 – 1494), became Lord of Syros in 1463 after his older brother Francesco's death
- Antonio Crispo, Governor of the Duchy of the Archipelago (died 1505), Governor of the Duchy of the Archipelago between 1496 and 1505
- Antonio Crispo, Governor of the Duchy of the Archipelago (died 1584), Governor of the Duchy of the Archipelago between 1544 and 1554
- Francesco I Crispo, Patrizio Veneto (died 1397), the tenth Duke of the Archipelago through his marriage and the will of Venice
- Giacomo Crispo, Governor of the Duchy of the Archipelago (died 1505), was a Governor of the Duchy of the Archipelago in 1494
- Giacomo I Crispo (or Jacopo) (1383–1418), the eleventh Duke of the Archipelago
- Giacomo II Crispo (or Jacopo) (1426–1447), the thirteenth Duke of the Archipelago
- Giacomo IV Crispo, the last Duke of the Archipelago, ruling from 1564, when he succeeded his father Giovanni IV Crispo
- Gian Giacomo Crispo (1446–1453), the fourteenth Duke of the Archipelago
- John Crispo (1933–2009), Canadian economist, author and educator
- John II Crispo (1388–1433), the twelfth Duke of the Archipelago
- Nicholas Crispo, Lord of Syros, Patrizio Veneto (1392–1450), became Lord of Syros in 1420 and Regent of the Duchy of the Archipelago 1447–1450
- Tiberio Crispo (1498–1566), the son of Giovanni Battista Crispo and Silvia Ruffini, who, after her husband's death, was the mistress of Alessandro Farnese
- William II Crispo (or Guglielmo) (1390–1463), the fifteenth Duke of the Archipelago, from 1453 to 1463

== Other ==
- Crispo, a tragedy by Tommaso Sgricci (1789–1836), premiered in 1827, named after Flavius Julius Crispus

== See also ==
- Crispano
- Crispiano
- Crispino
