= Loredan rule in Tinos and Mykonos =

- 1468–1518
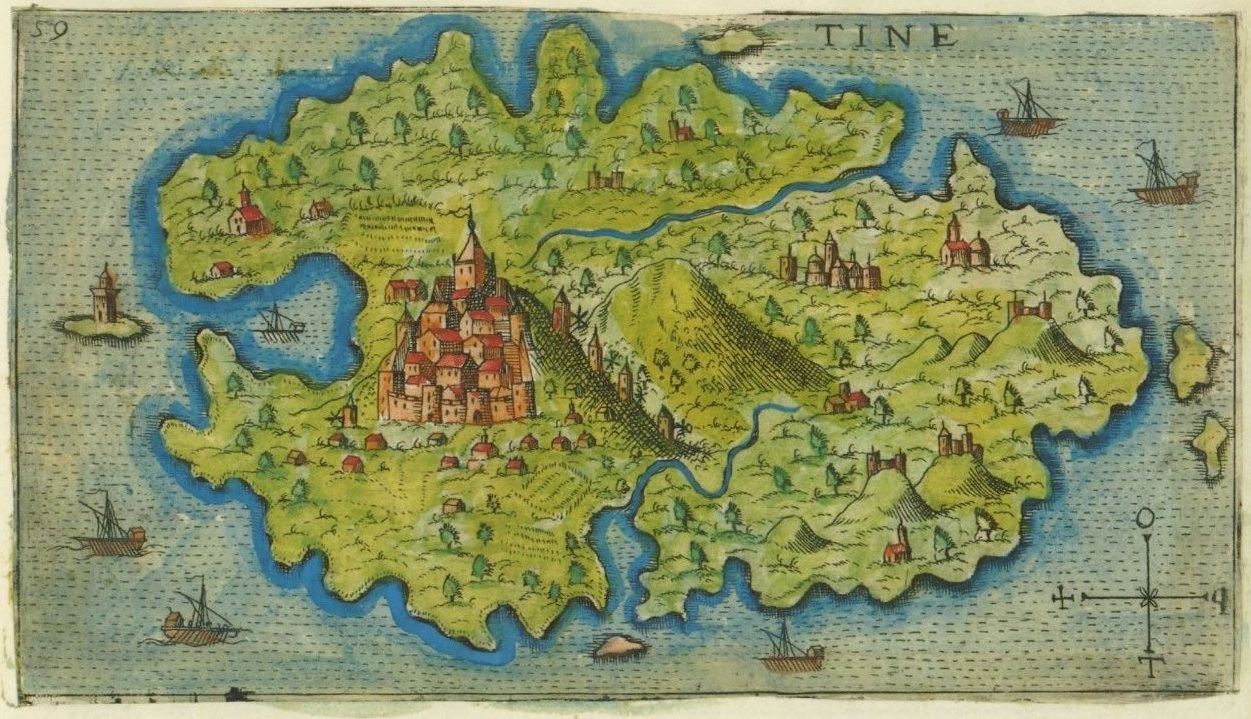
- Tinos, by Giacomo Franco, 1597
- Location: Tinos, Republic of Venice; Mykonos, Republic of Venice
- Owner: House of Loredan

Loredan rule in Tinos and Mykonos refers to the extensive property holdings and economic interests acquired by members of the Loredan family in the Aegean islands of Tinos and Mykonos during the 15th century. Beginning with the Venetian patrician Marco Loredan, who served as rector of the islands from 1452 to 1456, the family acquired hereditary estates and commercial privileges in 1468, following the Conspiracy of Sifis Vlastos and Marco's involvement in the pursuit of the outlaw Georgios Therianos. The Loredans subsequently became major landowners and economic actors on the islands, while remaining subject to the sovereignty and administration of the Republic of Venice. Their principal holdings were sold or transferred during the early 16th century, although members of the family retained property interests on Tinos into the 18th century.

== History ==
=== Background ===
The eastern Mediterranean in 1450.

Tinos and Mykonos formed part of the network of Latin-ruled territories established in the Aegean after the Fourth Crusade. During the 13th and 14th centuries the islands were associated with the Venetian Ghisi family. Following the extinction of the Ghisi lordship, they came increasingly under the control of the Republic of Venice and were administered within the Venetian colonial system of the eastern Mediterranean, the so-called Stato da Màr (lit. State of the Sea). The National Hellenic Research Foundation describes their incorporation into the Venetian state as a consequence of Venice's acquisition of Euboea following the death of Giorgio III Ghisi.

The islands were strategically situated along maritime routes linking the Venetian possessions of the Aegean with Euboea, Crete and the eastern Mediterranean. Their economic importance lay principally in agriculture, livestock, local commerce, and their position as ports and anchorages. The position of the islands became increasingly important to Venice during the 15th century, as the Republic attempted to maintain its Aegean possessions in the face of Ottoman expansion.

The Loredan family had already been present in the Aegean before their involvement in Tinos and Mykonos. By the mid-15th century, members of the family already possessed territorial interests in the Cyclades: Giovanni Loredan became lord of Antiparos through his marriage to Maria Sommaripa, of the family that ruled Paros, and in 1440 built the fortified settlement that survives as the Castle of Antiparos, bringing inhabitants to the island at his own expense. The family's connections with the Aegean ruling elite continued in subsequent generations; in 1496, Taddea Caterina Loredan married Francesco III Crispo, Duke of the Archipelago, and their son John IV Crispo eventually succeeded to the Duchy, while Taddea Caterina's brother Antonio Loredan served as regent during John's minority.

=== Marco Loredan ===
Tinos and Mykonos were Venetian-controlled but rather peripheral islands, administered initially through the Venetian government of Negroponte/Euboea. They were small, relatively poor, exposed to piracy, but were situated in an extremely important position in the central Aegean. The islands sat on the maritime routes connecting Negroponte, the Cyclades, Crete and the wider eastern Mediterranean. So although the islands themselves were not particularly rich, someone who controlled land and the infrastructure serving passing ships could utilise them for income.

The central figure in the establishment of Loredan interests on the islands was Marco Loredan, son of Zorzi Loredan. He was appointed rector of Tinos and Mykonos in 1452 and remained in office until 1456.

As rector, Loredan had access to the administrative and fiscal information of the islands. Venetian records provided detailed information about land, cultivation, buildings, livestock, taxation, and the rights of different categories of inhabitants. His period of government therefore gave him a detailed understanding of the islands' economic resources.

=== Georgios Therianos and the acquisition of property ===
The event that enabled Marco Loredan to establish his major property interests was connected with the Conspiracy of Sifis Vlastos and the outlaw Georgios Therianos, who was involved in the plot which had the intention to kill Venetian officials and nobles, overthrow Venetian rule and transfer sovereignty to a member of the deposed Palaiologos dynasty.

Therianos became involved in the political unrest surrounding the Cretan rebellion of the 1450s and was subsequently declared an outlaw by the Venetian authorities. The Council of Ten described him as a serious, continuing threat, and a substantial monetary reward of 2,000 hyperpyra was offered for his capture. Therianos continued to evade Venetian forces and was associated with illegal maritime activity in the southern Aegean. A Venetian fusta associated with him was captured at Milos, but Therianos escaped; later reports placed him at Karpathos, where he was building another, larger vessel.

This is where Marco Loredan saw an opportunity. When an operation conducted under his authority resulted in Therianos's capture, instead of simply asking for the cash bounty that he was entitled to for the elimination of Therianos, Loredan asked the Venetian government to compensate him in property on Tinos and Mykonos.

His request was unusually extensive. It included property at the harbour of Agios Nikolaos on Tinos, agricultural land in the region of Oxomereia, houses and other properties, a windmill, an inn, several properties within the fortified settlement of Mykonos, and a feud that had previously reverted to the Venetian state.

From his preserved letter to the Venetian government, Loredan’s request can be reconstructed more precisely:

On Tinos, he wanted:

- the unfinished tower at the harbour of Agios Nikolaos;
- the surrounding area;
- extensive territory extending through Oxomereia and other named localities;
- land, water, trees and associated rights;
- a former feud of Nicoleto Orso, which had reverted to the public domain;
- permission to develop and fortify the tower;
- restrictions on habitation near the tower;
- commercial rights to sell bread and wine wholesale and retail without duty;
- the associated agricultural and natural resources.

On Mykonos, he wanted:

- the windmill at Paraporti, which had apparently been out of operation for roughly 36 years;
- four residential units in the fortified settlement;
- an albergo (inn);
- associated terraces;
- agricultural property;
- and other rights associated with the estate.

The resulting transaction transformed what might have been a conventional aristocratic landholding into a much more extensive economic enterprise, encompassing production, transportation/distribution, processing, resale and services.

=== Why Venice agreed ===
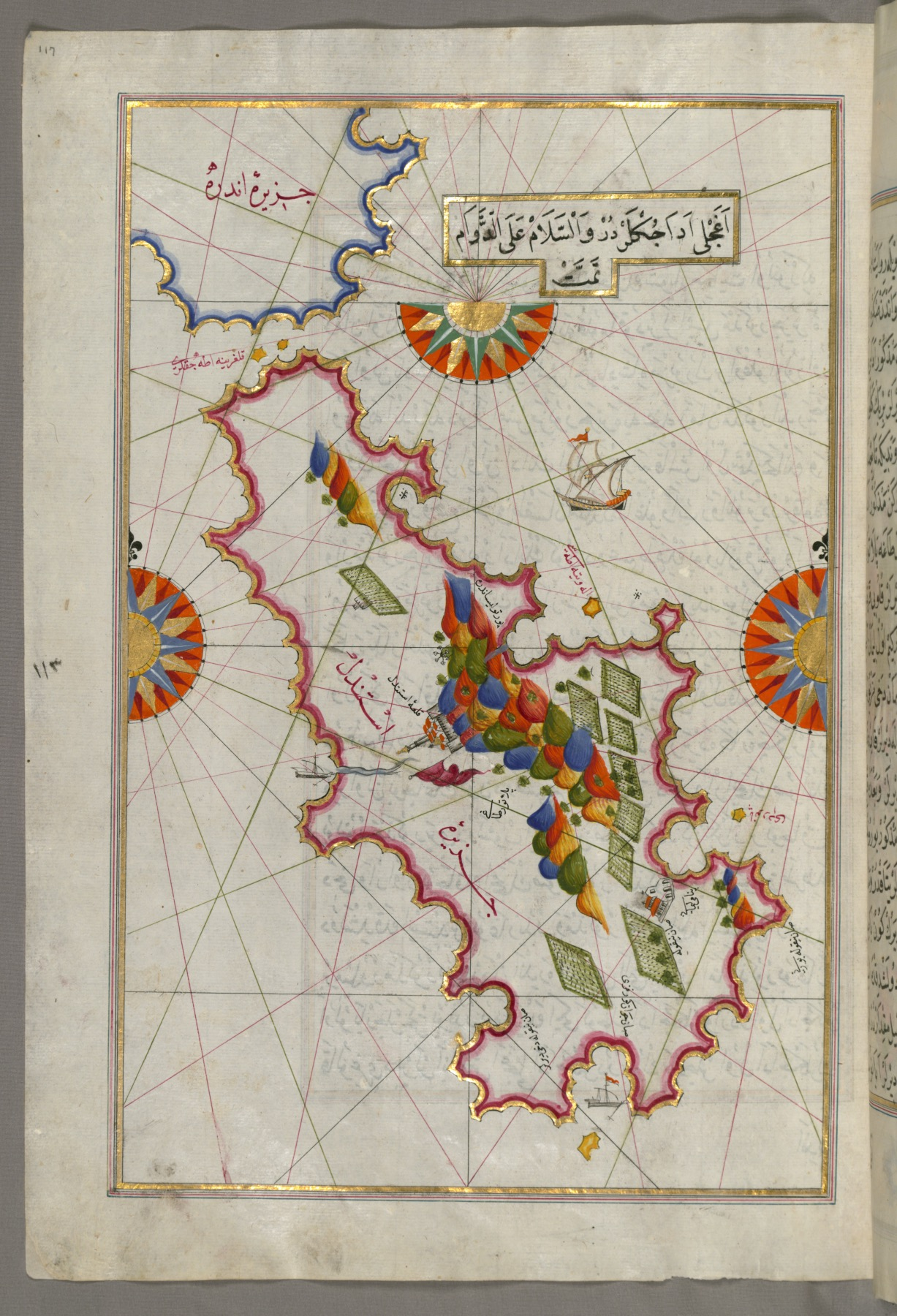
Ottoman map of Tinos, 16th century

In terms of the geopolitical context of the period, the timing of Loredan’s request was exceptionally favourable. Constantinople had fallen in 1453, and the subsequent expansion of the Ottoman Empire dramatically altered the strategic environment of the Aegean. Piracy increased, maritime communications became more dangerous, and Venice grew increasingly concerned about the security of Negroponte (Euboea), its principal Aegean stronghold.

Consequently, perhaps the most interesting aspect of Marco Loredan’s request was that he did not simply ask for property: he proposed to make the tower at Agios Nikolaos functional. The tower was unfinished and uninhabited, but it had a strategic importance beyond its value as private property. Marco proposed to complete and fortify it, asking the Venetian administration to provide ammunition and military personnel when necessary. Its development was connected with the defence of the harbour and the protection of the island's maritime position. Loredan envisioned it as a lookout and watchtower capable of warning the inhabitants and ships of approaching Turkish or pirate vessels. The Venetian government's willingness to approve the concession should therefore be understood partly in the context of its wider concern with the defence of its Aegean possessions. The three Venetian officials who reviewed his request—former rectors Marco Bondumier, Nicolò da Canal, and Andrea Priuli—were remarkably positive about the proposal. Nicolò da Canal, who had served as rector of Tinos for three years, argued that completing the tower would benefit not merely Tinos but the ships and islands throughout that part of the Aegean, and recommended that three men guard it continuously. Andrea Priuli likewise emphasised that the tower’s completion would benefit the islands and proposed that Loredan be required to maintain three guards.

Marco’s proposal, therefore, was not simply a request for free land. Rather, he was offering to take underused state assets, invest his own resources in them, develop the surrounding territory, and make the area both more productive and more secure, thereby creating a direct benefit for Venice. For the Venetian authorities, allowing a wealthy Venetian nobleman to invest his own capital in developing strategically important infrastructure on the islands, in return for hereditary property rights, was an attractive proposition.

=== The 1468 grant ===
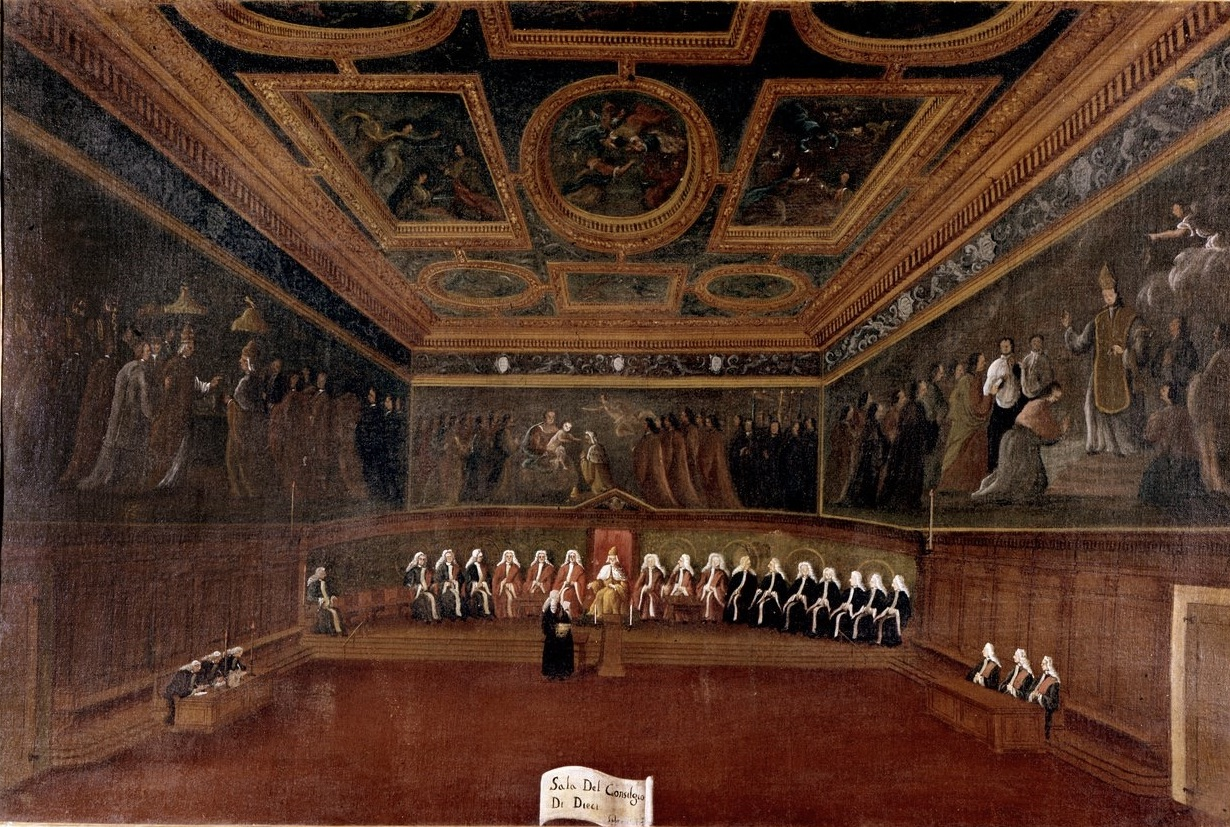
The Council of Ten, the authority that granted Marco Loredan and his heirs the properties on Tinos and Mykonos.

In July of 1468 the Venetian authorities approved most of Marco Loredan's request and granted him and his heirs hereditary rights over a substantial collection of properties and privileges.

Among the most significant were the tower and associated property at the harbour of Agios Nikolaos, agricultural estates in Tinos, and properties in Mykonos. The grant also included economic privileges connected with the sale of food and other provisions.

Marco's proposed estate combined several different forms of economic activity. Agricultural land provided crops and other products; livestock supplied additional resources; the windmill allowed agricultural production to be processed; the inn and houses generated income from travellers and residents; and the harbour provided access to maritime commerce.

The Venetian government nevertheless placed limits on the grant. The decision of the Council of Ten explicitly declared that Marco and his heirs would not be lords of the territory. The islands remained under Venetian authority, and the Loredans remained subject to the jurisdiction of the Venetian rector. This was a distinctive feature of Venetian colonial government; Venice was perfectly willing to allow an aristocratic family to accumulate enormous private property, provided that ultimate political and judicial authority remained with the state.

Venice also rejected at least part of Loredan’s request concerning the transfer of dependent peasants and their property.

=== The Loredan economic estate ===
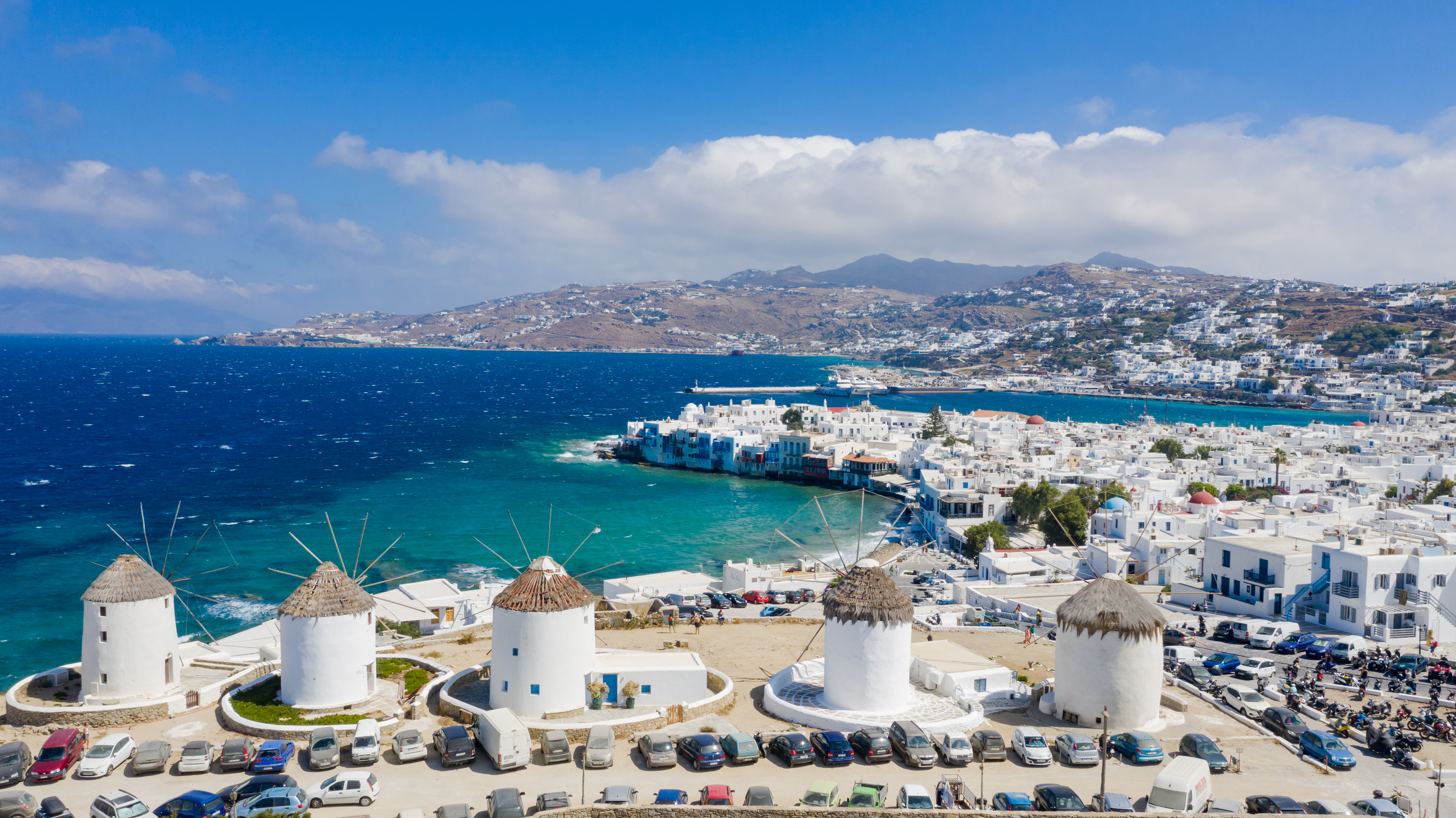
The picturesque windmills of Mykonos, built by the Venetians in the 16th century.

Loredan chose his properties intelligently. The tower at Agios Nikolaos was an existing defensive structure whose foundations probably went back to the tower described by the Florentine monk Cristoforo Buondelmonti when he visited the Aegean around 1415–20. Furthermore, the Loredan property around Oxomereia was substantial. On Mykonos, Marco acquired several houses inside the fortified settlement. He also sought property around useful anchorages and productive areas, while the proposed legal rights and commercial privileges he obtained were complementary to the economic structure of the enterprise.

Agricultural estates supplied food and other commodities. Livestock provided further agricultural income. The windmill allowed grain to be processed locally, while the inn and residential properties generated income from the movement of people through the islands.

The harbour was particularly important. Marco's request for commercial privileges there indicates that he regarded maritime traffic as an essential part of the economic potential of his holdings. The ability to supply ships and travellers with food, wine and other necessities connected the Loredan estates with the wider Aegean commercial network.

=== The Loredans and the Venetian government ===
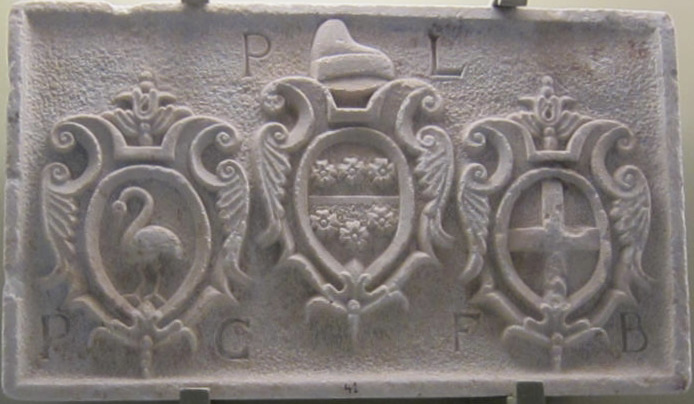
Coat of arms of Doge Pietro Loredan (r. 1567 – 1570) in Crete.

The family's economic position was closely connected with its political status within the Venetian Republic.

Marco Loredan's acquisition of property took place while he was a Venetian official, and members of the family continued to participate in the administration of the islands. In the early 1470s, a dispute between Marco Loredan and the Venetian rector of Tinos and Mykonos reached the central government in Venice. In January of 1474, Venetian authorities reminded the rector that in 1468 they had ordered his predecessor to execute the concession made to Marco Loredan concerning the feuds in Tinos and Mykonos, and stated that the property had been formally delivered to Loredan through the local officials, with its boundaries and markers recorded. The Council of Ten thus intervened in support of the government's earlier decision and imposed a fine of 200 lire on the rector. The Doge simultaneously informed the Venetian authorities in Crete, which had administrative responsibility for the islands after the changes in their governmental organisation, so that they could ensure compliance with the central government's decision.

In 1479, Giorgio Loredan, Marco's son, was elected rector of Tinos and Mykonos. The unusual combination of hereditary private property and a family member holding the public office responsible for administering the islands strengthened the Loredans' already influential position in Tinos and Mykonos.

=== Sale of the Loredan properties ===
The Loredan presence eventually declined during the early 16th century.

By 1518, a substantial part of the family's property interests on Tinos had been sold to Pietro da Scutari for 3,000 ducats. The transaction marked the family's withdrawal from the position of a major economic power in the Aegean that it had established during the second half of the 15th century.

The sale did not, however, mark the complete disappearance of the Loredans from Tinos. According to evidence cited by Koumanoudi from the work of the Greek historian Fr. Markos Foskolos, members of the family continued to possess property interests on Tinos into the 18th century.

The chronology of the Loredan family's withdrawal from Mykonos is less clearly established by the evidence currently assembled, and should not automatically be equated with the chronology of their Tinos property.

== Historical significance ==
The history of the Loredans on Tinos and Mykonos illustrates the interaction between Venetian colonial government and private aristocratic enterprise in the eastern Mediterranean.

The Loredans did not establish an independent lordship over the islands. Instead, they exploited the opportunities created by Venetian sovereignty to acquire hereditary property, commercial privileges, and influence while remaining within the political framework of the Republic of Venice.

The case also demonstrates the importance of Venetian patrician networks in the economic development of the Stato da Màr. Political office could provide access to information about local resources and institutions, while wealth and family connections could subsequently be converted into landholding and commercial privileges.

The Loredan estate on Tinos and Mykonos was consequently an example of how Venetian patrician families could combine government office, private property, maritime commerce, and colonial administration to establish long-lasting economic interests in the Aegean.

The episode has been described by Marina Koumanoudi in her 2017 study The Outlawed Rebel, or How the Loredan Came to Dominate the Economic Life of Tinos and Mykonos.

== Timeline ==
Loredan rule in Tinos and Mykonos
Date	Event
1452 – 1456	Marco Loredan serves as rector of Tinos and Mykonos
1454 – 1455	Georgios Therianos becomes involved in anti-Venetian disturbances and is outlawed
1460s	Loredan captures Therianos and claims the bounty, asking Venice for property instead of cash
27 July 1468	Council of Ten approves the grant, with conditions
February 1469	Loredan arrives on the islands to take possession of the granted territories
1473	The island communities complain about the rector's violations of privileges
January 1474	Venice intervenes in a dispute involving Loredan's property rights and the rector
1479	Marco Loredan's son Giorgio becomes rector of Tinos and Mykonos
1518	Loredans sell a substantial portion of their Tinos interests to Pietro da Scutari for 3,000 ducats
18th century	Loredan interests on Tinos are still documented

== See also ==
- Conspiracy of Sifis Vlastos
- Giovanni Loredan, Lord of Antiparos
- Kingdom of Candia
- Kingdom of the Morea
- Stato da Màr

== Bibliography ==
Primary sources

- ASV, Consiglio dei Dieci, Deliberazioni miste, reg. 17, fol. 63r, 27 July 1468.
- ASV, Archivio Duca di Candia, b. 2, fasc. 32, fol. 34r, 18 January 1474.

Secondary sources

- Koumanoudi, Marina. Ο επικηρυγμένος επαναστάτης ή πως οι Loredan κυριάρχησαν στην οικονομική ζωή της Τήνου και της Μυκόνου (15ος αι.) [“The Outlawed Rebel, or How the Loredan Came to Dominate the Economic Life of Tinos and Mykonos (15th c.)”]. In Ministerium Historiae: Τιμή στον π. Μάρκο Φώσκολο. Tinos, 2017, pp. 291–315.
- Bertoša, Slaven. Gli orizzonti mediterranei della famiglia veneziana Loredan. ["The Mediterranean Horizons of the Venetian Loredan Family"]. In Atti del Centro di Ricerche Storiche di Rovigno 42 (2012): 537–569.
- Da Mosto, Andrea. L'Archivio di Stato di Venezia: Indice generale, storico, descrittivo ed analitico. Vol. II. Rome: Biblioteca d'Arte Editrice, 1940
- National Hellenic Research Foundation, The Challenges of Governance: The Administration of Tinos and Mykonos During the First Century of Venetian Rule (15th–Early 16th Century).
