= Lordship of Paros =

Lordship of the island Paros that existed between 1389 and 1537

Paros is an island of the Cyclades group in the central Aegean Sea, which in 1389 became a separate lordship within the Duchy of the Archipelago that lasted until the Duchy's conquest by the Ottoman Empire in 1537.

Its rulers were:

- Maria Sanudo (died 1426) with her husband Gaspare Sommaripa (died 1402)
- Crusino I Sommaripa (died 1462), son of Maria Sanudo and Gaspare Sommaripa
- Nicolò I Sommaripa (died 1505), son of Crusino I
- Fiorenza Sommaripa (died 1518), daughter of Nicolò I
- Nicolò Venier (1483-1531), son of Fiorenza
- Cecilia Venier (died 1543), daughter of Fiorenza

== See also ==
- Lordship of Andros
