= Sommaripa =

Sommaripa is a surname. Notable people with the surname include:

- Crusino I Sommaripa (died 1462), Italian nobleman
- Crusino II Sommaripa (died ca. 1500), Italian nobleman
- Domenico Sommaripa (died 1466), Italian nobleman
- Fiorenza Sommaripa (died after 1520), Italian noblewoman
- Gaspare Sommaripa (died 1402), Italian nobleman
- Giovanni Sommaripa (died 1468), Italian nobleman
- Niccolò Sommaripa (died ca. 1505), Italian nobleman
