= Giacomo Crispo =

Giacomo Crispo or Jacopo Crispo may refer to:

- Giacomo I Crispo (d. 1418), Duke of the Archipelago from 1397 to 1418
- Giacomo II Crispo (d. 1447), Duke of the Archipelago from 1433 to 1447
- Giacomo III Crispo (d. 1480), Duke of the Archipelago from 1463 to 1480
- Giacomo IV Crispo (d. 1576), Duke of the Archipelago from 1564 to 1566
- Giacomo Crispo, Governor of the Duchy of the Archipelago (d. 1505), ruled briefly in 1494

== See also ==
- Gian Giacomo Crispo
