= List of island dynasties in Greece =

This is a list of Greek island dynasties following the Latin conquest, based on the contributions of historian and professor Carl Hermann Friedrich Johann Hopf (1832–1873). Hopf's publications, particularly "Urkunden und Zusätze zur Geschichte der Insel Andros und ihrer Beherrscher in dem Zeitraume von 1207 bis 1566," published in the Sitzungsberichte of the Vienna Academy in 1856, provided a comprehensive list of island lordships, which provide an insight in the governance of the islands during Latin conquest period.

Island	Ownership and years
Corfu	Venetian 1207-c. 1214; to Despotate of Epirus c. 1214–1259; King Manfred and Filippo Chinardo 1259–1267; Neapolitan 1267–1386; Venetian 1386–1797.
Cefalonia, Zante, Ithaca	Despotate of Epirus 1205–1337; Greek Empire 1337–1357; the Tocchi 1357–1482.
Santa Maura	Despotate of Epirus 1205–1331; Giorgi 1331–1362; the Tocchi 1362–1482.
Paxo	With Cefalonia 1205–1357; St. Ippolyto 1357–1484; Ugoth (Gotti) 1484–1527. With Cerigotto 1527–1707.
Cerigo (Cythera)	The Venieri 1207–1269; the Monojanni 1267–1309; the Venieri 1300-1707·
Cerigotto	The Viari 1207–1655; the Foscarini and Giustiniani 1655–1797.
Salamis	With Athens.
Aegina	With Carystos 1205–1317; Aragonese 1317-c. 1400; Cavopena c. 1400–1451; Venetian 1451–1537.
Delos, Gyaros, Cythnos (Patmos).	With Naxos. [Sanudo allowed Patmos, the apostle's island, to preserve its independence.]
Tinos and Miconos	The Ghisi 1207–1390; Venetian 1390–1718. (Held in lief by Venetian counts belonging to the houses of Bembo, Quirini, and Fabieri 1407-1429·)
Andros	The Dandoli 1207–1233; the Ghisi 1233-c. 1250; the Sanudi c. 1250–1384; the Zeni 1384–1437; the Sommaripa 1437–1566.
Syra	With Naxos.
Zia (Ceos) (Ceos was under the Greek Empire from 1269 to 1296)	1/4: The Giustiniani 1207–1366; the Catalan family Da Coronia 1366–1464; the Gozzadini 1464–1537. 1/4: The Michieli 1207–1355; the Premarini 1355 forward. 1/2:The Ghisi 1207–1328; the Premarini 1328–1375. 9/16:The Premarini 1375-1537· 3/16:The Sanudi 1375–1405; the Gozzadini 1405–1537.
Serfene (Seriphos) (Seriphos was under the Greek Empire from 1269 to 1296)	1/4:the Michieli 1207–1537; 1/4: the Giustiniani 1207-c. 1412; the Adoldi 1412 forward. 1/2:the Ghisi 1207–1334; the Bragadini 1334–1354; the Minotti 1354–1373; the Adoldi 1373–1432; the Michieli 1432–1537.
Thermia (Cythnos)	The Sanudi 1207-c. 1320; the Castelli c. 1322–1331; the Gozzadini 1331-1537-
Sifanto (Siphnos), Sikino, Polycandro (Pholegandros)	The Sanudi 1207-1269 (titular, 1341; the Grimani titular 1341–1537); Greek Empire 1269–1307; the Da Coronia 1307–1464; the Gozzadini 1464–1617.
Milos and Cimolos	The Sanudi 1207–1376; the Crispo 1376–1566.
Santorin (Thera) and Therasia	The Barozzi 1207–1335; with Naxos 1335–1477; the Pisani 1477–1487; with Naxos 1487–1537.
Namfio (Anaphe)	The Foscoli 1207–1269; Greek Empire 1269–1307; the Gozzadini 1307–1420; the Crispo 1420–1469; the Barbari 1469–1528; the Pisani 1528–1537.
Nio (Anaea)	The Sanudi 1207–1269; Greek Empire 1269–1292; the Schiavi 1292-c. 1320; with Naxos c. 1320–1420; collateral branch of the Crispo 1420–1508; the Pisani 1508–1537.
Paros and Nausa	With Naxos 1207–1389; the Sommaripa 1389–1516; the Venieri 1516–1531; the Sagredi 1531–1537.
Antiparos	With Paros 1207–1439; the Loredani 1439-c.1490;the Pisani 1490–1537.
Naxos	The Sanudi 1207–1362; the Dalle Carceri 1362–1383; the Crispo 1383-1566·
Scyros, Sciathos, Chelidromi	The Ghisi 1207–1269; Greek Empire 1269–1455; Venetian 1455–1537.
Scopelos	The Ghisi 1207–1262; the Tiepoli 1262–1310; the Greek Empire 1310–1454; Venetian 1454–1538.
Negroponte	1/3: the dalle Carceri 1205–1254; the da Verona 1254–1383; the Somma-ripa 1383–1470. 1/3:the Peccorari 1205–1214; the dalle Carceri 1214-c. 1300; the Ghisi c. 1300–1390; Venetian 1390-14 70. 1/3:The da Verona 1205–1383; the da Noyer 1383–1470.
Carystos (in Negroponte)	The dalle Carceri 1205-c. 1254; the Cicons c. 1254–1292; the da Verona, 1292–1317; Aragonese 1317–1365; Venetian 1365–1386; the Giustiniani 1386–1404; Venetian 1404–1406; the Giorgi 1406–1470.
Lemnos	The Navigajosi (with these, subsequently, the Gradenighi and Fos-cari) 1207–1269; Greek Empire 1269–1453; the Gattilusj 1453–1462.
Lesbos	The Greek Empire 1205–1355; the Gattilusj 1355–1462.
Chios, Samos	With Constantinople (Empire of Romania) 1205–1247; with Lesbos 1247–1303; the Zaccaria 1303–1333; Greek Empire 1333–1346; the joint stock company of the Giustiniani, in 14 and more branches, 1346–1566.
Nikaria (Icaria)	The Beazzani 1205–1333; with Chios 1333–1481; the knights of St. John 1309–1521.
Stampali (Astypalaea)	The Quirini 1207–1269; Greek Empire 1269–1310; the Quirini and Grimani 1310–1537.
Amorgos	The Ghisi 1207–1269; Greek Empire 1269-1296 [? 1303]: the Ghisi 1296–1368; 1/2: the Quirini 1368–1537; 1/2: the Grimani 1368–1446; the Quirini 1446–1537.
Nisyros, Piscopia, Calchi	With Rhodes 1205–1306; the Assanti 1306–1385; with Rhodes 1385-1521·
Rhodes	Gavalas 1204–1246; Greek Empire 1246–1283; the Aidonoghlii 1283–1309; the Knights of St. John 1309–1521.
Scarpanto (Carpathos)	With Rhodes 1204–1306; the Moreschi 1306–1309; the Comari 1309–1522.
Candia	Montferrat 1203–1204; Venetian 1204–1669.
