= Francesca Morosini =

Francesca Morosini (fl. 1454), was a duchess consort of Naxos by marriage to John II Crispo. She served as guardian of her son Giacomo II Crispo from 1433 during his minority.

She was described as a "masterful woman", who continued to influence in the affairs of state during the reign of her son and grandson until the accession of William II to the throne in 1453.

In 1447, she claimed the post of regent for her grandson Gian Giacomo, but Niccolo of Syra and Santorin and William of Anaphe had her imprisoned and resumed regency with the support of Venice. When Niccolo died, Francesca Morosini, the archbishop and the Naxians elected his son Francesco in his place in the regency and successfully asked Venice to ratify it.

After the succession of William II in 1453, the dowager duchess Francesca retired to Venice after having founded the church and monastery of St Antonio, bestowed to the Knights of St John in 1452.

Issue:

- Adriana Crispo, married to Domenico Sommaripa (–1466)
- Giacomo II Crispo
- Caterina Crispo (d. 1454), unmarried and without issue
