= Maria Sanudo =

Lady of the island of Andros in the Duchy of the Archipelago

Maria Sanudo (died 1426) was lady of the island of Andros in the Duchy of the Archipelago in 1372–1383, and lady of the island of Paros and of one third of Negroponte in 1383–1426 in co-regency with her spouse, Gaspare Sommaripa.

== Life ==
Maria Sanudo was a daughter of the Duchess of the Archipelago Florence Sanudo and her second husband Nicholas II Sanudo, and half-sister of Nicholas III dalle Carceri (r. 1371–1383), the last Duke of the Archipelago from the House of Sanudo.

=== Lady of Andros ===
After Florence Sanudo died, she was succeeded by her son Nicholas III. As he was still a minor, the regency was exercised for a time by Nicholas Sanudo. In December 1371, Maria received from her half brother (in reality from her own father in his capacity as regent) the island of Andros, the second largest island of the duchy after Naxos, as a fief. The grant stipulated that as feudatories of the Duke, Maria and her heirs were obliged to render personal military service for a three-month period each year, as well as send twenty marines for the ducal galleys for two months every year. Maria was also obliged to not marry without her half-brother's permission, as well as to look after her younger sister Lisia, and find her a suitable husband. In reality, as Maria too was under-age, the oath of fealty and the ceremony of investiture were probably undertaken by Nicholas Sanudo, who also exercised the governance of the island until his daughter's coming of age, as he is mentioned in contemporary documents as dominus insule Andre. In 1372, Maria also received a grant of the small island of Antiparos and the domain of Lichada on Euboea.

Nicholas III, probably again under the influence of his stepfather, later changed the terms of the grant from a feo to a censo, replacing the owed military service with an annual rent. Soon after coming of age himself and dispensing with his stepfather's regency, however, he tried to renege on the change. Nicholas Sanudo turned to the Republic of Venice, which in August 1373 ordered Nicholas III to redress the issue. At about the same time, the issue of Maria's marriage came to the fore following the failure of negotiations for her marriage to the son of Boniface Fadrique, lord of Salona, Lidoriki and Aigina. As had been the case for her mother, due to her possessions in Euboea, the affair was of great concern to Venice: the local Venetian bailo of Negroponte, Bartolomeo Querini, suggested a marriage to his son Zanino. Nicholas Sanudo went to meet the bailo at Negroponte and agreed, in exchange for assistance in the matter of his daughter's domains. The deal was kept a secret, and the unsuspecting Nicholas III gave his consent. Maria and her father travelled to Negroponte, but in the event the marriage fell through, for almost at the last minute, Nicholas III fell out with the bailo, perhaps suspecting his designs, and revoked his permission.

In 1376, there was yet another marriage attempt, this time with George III Ghisi; the match had the approval of Venice and received a papal dispensation—Maria and George were third cousins—but in the event the wedding never took place.

=== Lady of Paros ===
Nicholas III was murdered in 1383 by Francesco I Crispo (r. 1383–1397), who became the new duke. The new ruler promised to "treat as his own child" Maria, but she continued to challenge his right to rule. Seeking to cement his position and gain recognition from the Venetian bailo at Negroponte, Crispo arranged a marriage between his daughter and Pietro Zeno, the son of the bailo. As his daughter's dowry, he gave the islands of Syros and Andros, which he took from Maria. As a compensation, she was given the island of Paros in 1389, on condition that she marry the Veronese Gaspare Sommaripa.

Paros (and Antiparos) were a not inconsiderable fief: the islands were valuable, and each furnished thirty sailors to the ducal galleys. Nevertheless, the marriage was a calculated political ploy by Crispo: Sommaripa may have been connected to his fellow Veronese dalle Carceri, but held no feudal rank or titles, and the new duke intended to neutralize Maria by marrying her to this politically insignificant parvenu. Through the intervention of Venice, Maria also succeeded her half-brother as lady of one third of the island of Euboea. From her marriage with Gaspare Sommaripa, Maria had Crusino I Sommaripa, and Fiorenza Sommaripa, wife of Duke Giacomo I Crispo (r. 1397–1418).

Throughout her life, Maria did not abandon her claims to Andros, and after half a century of legal disputes, in 1440 her son Crusino was able to regain possession of it. Giacomo I was succeeded by his brother, John II Crispo (r. 1418–1433), who, in the words of William Miller, "acted with a complete lack of chivalry towards his sister-in-law and her mother, Maria Sanudo, reducing them to penury and exile by depriving them of their islands" until 1421, conceding only after repeated remonstrations by the Venetian authorities, backed by the threat of force.

Maria Sanudo died in 1426.

== Sources ==
- Bury, John Bagnell (1888). "The Lombards and Venetians in Euboia (1430–1470)". The Journal of Hellenic Studies. 9: 91–117. doi:10.2307/623661. JSTOR 623661. S2CID 162986159.
- Jacoby, David (1971). La féodalité en Grèce médiévale. Les "Assises de Romanie", sources, application et diffusion (in French). Éditions de l'École des hautes études en sciences sociales.
- Koumanoudi, Marina (2002). "Contra deum ius et iustitiam. The trial of Bartolomeo Querini, bailo and capitano of Negroponte". In Maltezou, Chrysa A.; Schreiner, Peter (eds.). Bisanzio, Venezia e il mondo franco-greco (XIII-XV secolo): atti del Colloquio internazionale organizzato nel centenario della nascita di Raymond-Joseph Loenertz o.p., Venezia, 1-2 dicembre 2000. Venice: Hellenic Institute of Byzantine and Post-Byzantine Studies, German Centre for Venetian Studies. pp. 235–288. ISBN 9607743229.
- Loenertz, Raymond-Joseph (1975). Les Ghisi, dynastes vénitiens dans l'Archipel (1207-1390) (in French). Florence: Olschki.
- Miller, William (1908). The Latins in the Levant, a History of Frankish Greece (1204–1566). New York: E.P. Dutton and Company.
- Miller, William (1921). Essays on the Latin Orient. Cambridge: Cambridge University Press.
