= Nicholas Crispo, Lord of Syros =

Nicholas Crispo, Patrizio Veneto (or Niccolò; 1392–1450), became Lord of Syros in 1420 and Regent of the Duchy of the Archipelago between 1447 and 1450. He was a son of Francesco I Crispo, tenth Duke of the Archipelago, and wife Fiorenza I Sanudo, Lady of Milos, and brother of Dukes Giacomo I, John II and William II.

== Marriage and issue ==
It is not known for certain how many wives Crispo had. In a letter dated 1426, Crispo says he was married to the daughter of Jacopo Gattilusio, lord of Lesbos. In a 1474 chronicle by the Venetian traveller Caterino Zeno it is said that he was married to an Eudoksia Valenza, of whom there is no other mention in any source. Although Zeno claims that she was a daughter of John IV of Trebizond, this has been disproved by historiographical research, which has shown that John had an only daughter, Theodora Despina (married to Uzun Hassan of Ak Koyunlu). Alternative identities have been proposed for Valenza: whether it was the name of Gattilusio's daughter, whether she was a daughter of Alexios IV of Trebizond or whether she was a Genoese woman.

- Caterina Crispo, married in 1429 Angelo I Gozzadini, Lord of Kythnos (- 1468/76)
- Lucrezia Crispo, married Nobil Huomo Leone Malipiero, Patrizio Veneto
- Francesco II Crispo
- Petronilla Crispo, married in 1437 Nobil Huomo Jacopo Priuli, Patrizio Veneto
- Maria Crispo, married Nobil Huomo Nicolo Balbi, Patrizio Veneto
- Fiorenza Crispo (–1501), married in 1444 Nobil Huomo Marco Cornaro, Cavaliere del Sacro Romano Impero, Patrizio Veneto (Venice, December 1406 – Venice, 1 August 1479), and had:
  - Giorgio Cornaro
  - Catherine Cornaro
- Valenza Crispo, married Nobil Huomo Giovanni Loredan, Patrizio Veneto
- Marco Crispo, Knight of the Knights Hospitaller, who had illegitimate issue
- Violante Crispo, married Nobil Huomo Caterino Zeno, Patrizio Veneto, Diplomat of the Venetian Republic, and had:
  - Adriana Zeno
  - Pietro Zeno
  - A daughter
- Anthony Crispo, Lord of Syros
