= Dragonetto Clavelli =

Lord of Nisyros

Dragonetto Clavelli was a lord of Nisyros.

He married Agnese Crispo (1386–1428), daughter of Francesco I Crispo, tenth Duke of the Archipelago, and wife Fiorenza Sanudo, Lady of Milos.
