= Giovanni Loredan, Lord of Antiparos =

15th-century Venetian nobleman

Giovanni Loredan
- Lord of Antiparos
- Known for: building the Castle of Antiparos
- Residence: Castle of Antiparos
- Family: House of Loredan
- Spouses: Maria Sommaripa, Lady of Antiparos
- Issue: Lucrezia Loredan, Lady of Ios and Therasia
- Father: Alvise Loredan
- Mother: Andriola Negrobon

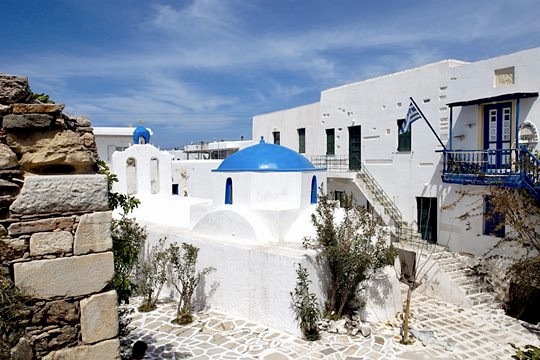
Castle of Antiparos, built in 1440

Giovanni Loredan, Lord of Antiparos was a Venetian nobleman of the Loredan family. He is notable for building the Castle of Antiparos and bringing inhabitants to the island at his own expense.

== Life ==
Apparently the Venetians did not pay much attention to the island which by the beginning of the 15th century was a pirate base and haven. This changed when Giovanni became the lord of the island. Loredan brought new inhabitants to the island at his own expense and built the castle in 1440 which had a very specific and unique style of architecture. The castle and the island remained in the ownership of the House of Loredan until 1480, when they were given as a dowry to Domenico Pisani, son of the Duke of Crete who had married Fiorenza, the daughter of the Duke of Naxos.

Giovanni married Maria Sommaripa (d. 1446), from the family of the rulers of Paros, and they had a daughter Lucrezia Loredan (1446-1528), Lady of Antiparos.
