= Cecilia Venier =

Lady of Paros
- Reign: 1531–1537
- Predecessor: Nicolò Venier
- Successor: Title Abolished
- Co-Lord: Bernado Sagredo
- Died: c.1543 Republic of Venice
- Spouse: Bernado Sagredo
- Father: Zuan Francesco Venier
- Mother: Fiorenza Sommaripa

Cecilia Venier (died 1543) was suo jure lady of Paros from 1531 to 1537. She served as the last ruler of Paros before it was conquered by the Ottoman Empire in 1537.

== Life ==
Cecilia was the daughter of Fiorenza Sommaripa and Zuan Francesco Venier. After the death of her brother Nicolò in 1531, she claimed the island of Paros, against Crusino III Sommaripa and John IV Crispo. Until the dispute could be resolved, Venice administered the island. Her rights where acknowledged in 1535 after a trial in Venice, and she ruled jointly with her spouse, Bernado Sagredo.

In 1537 Paros was conquered by the Ottoman Hayreddin Barbarossa. Cecilia and her spouse abandoned the fortress at Agousa and was besieged in the castle of Kephalos, were her spouse took command of the defense with the aid of a Florentine outlaw and resisted the Ottoman siege for several days. Sagredo was eventually forced to surrender because of the lack of gun powder.

In the treaty of surrender, Cecilia Venier was deposed from her position and allowed to depart the island for refuge in Venice, while her spouse were held captive by the Ottomans, but was eventually released from captivity. However, the Ottoman conquest of Paros reportedly led to atrocities committed against the public: as happened to the non-Muslim population in other islands, old men were killed; young men were made galley slaves; little boys were made janissaries; and the women where ordered to dance on the shore so that the conquerors could choose the most attractive for the lieutenants, enslaving around 6000 of the inhabitants of Paros for slavery in the Ottoman Empire. It is believed that her niece Cecilia Venier-Baffo, was also captured during the mass enslavement and was sold as a slave concubine to the Imperial harem of the Topkapı Palace in Constantinople, ultimately becoming Nurbanu Sultan, the Haseki sultan of Sultan Selim II and the Valide sultan and mother of Sultan Murad III, a prominent figure during Sultanate of Women and the ancestor to most of the Ottoman Dynasty.

Cecilia Venier died six years after her deposition.

== Sources ==
- Miller, William. The Latins in the Levant: A History of Frankish Greece (1204–1566). London: 1908.
