= Church of Panagia Paraportiani =

Church on Mykonos, Greece

Coordinates: 37.4471°N 25.3257°E

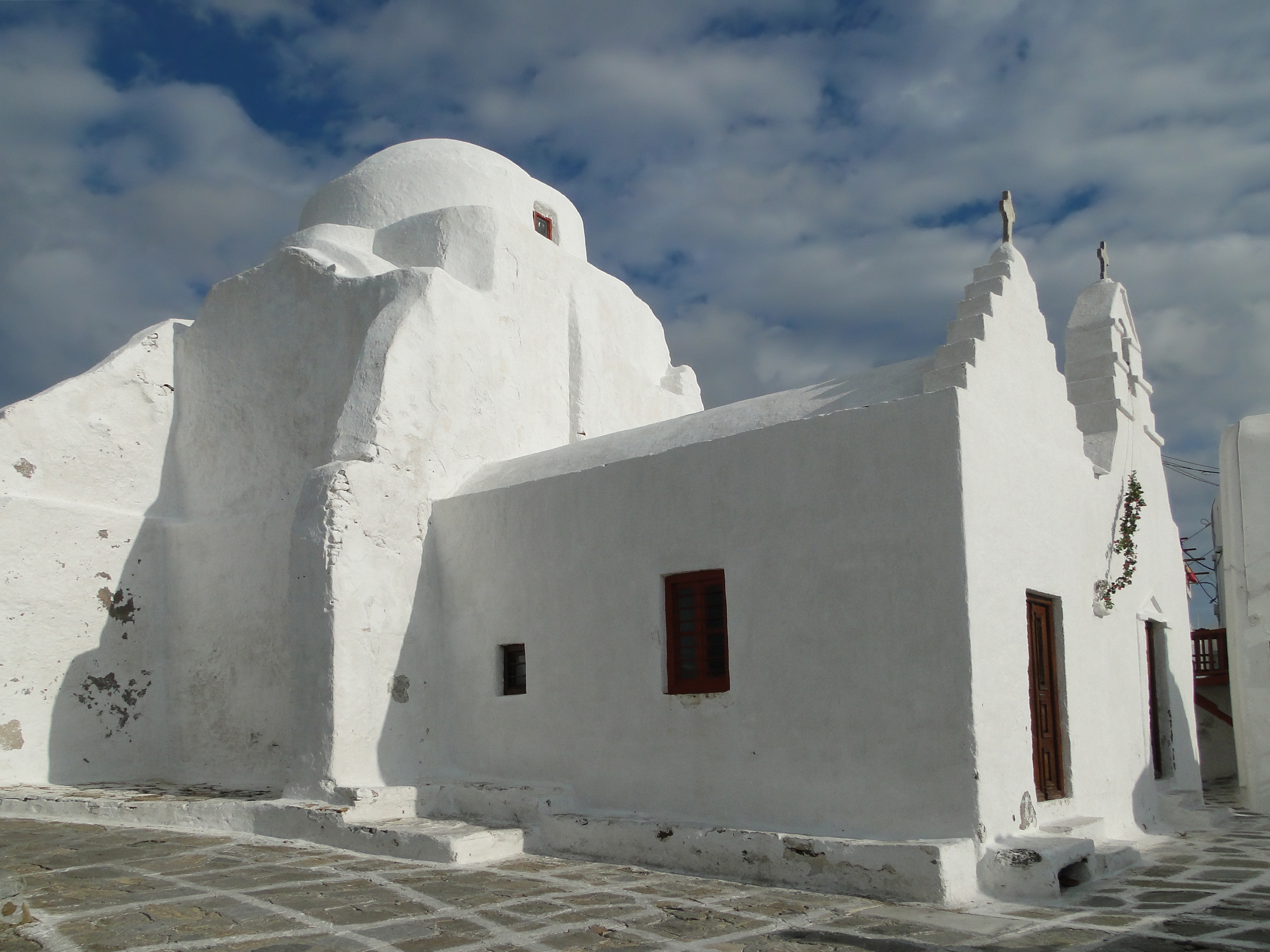
Church of Panagia Paraportiani, Mykonos

The Church of Panagia Paraportiani (Greek: Εκκλησία της Παναγίας της Παραπορτιανής) is situated in the neighbourhood of Kastro, in the town of Chora, on the Greek island of Mykonos. Its name literally means "Our Lady of the Side Gate" in Greek, as its entrance was found in the side gate of the entrance to the Kastro area.

Construction of this church started in 1425 and was not completed until the 17th century. This impressive, whitewashed church actually consists of five separate churches which are joined: the four churches (dedicated to Saint Eustathios, Saint Sozon, Saints Anargyroi and Saint Anastasia) are at ground level and constitute the base of the fifth church that has been built above them.
