= Petronilla Bembo =

Petronilla Bembo (fl. 1463), was a Duchess consort of Naxos by marriage to Francesco II Crispo.

She served as regent of Naxos during the minority of her son Giacomo III Crispo (r. 1463-1480).

Issue

1. Giacomo III Crispo
2. Giovanni III Crispo
