= Angelo I Gozzadini =

Angelo I Gozzadini (died between 1468 and 1476) was Lord of Kythnos.

He married in 1429 Caterina Crispo (born 1415, date of death unknown), daughter of Nicholas Crispo, Lord of Syros and sister of Francesco II, sixteenth Duke of the Archipelago.
