= Pietro Zeno =

Lord of Andro

Pietro Zeno (died 1427), was lord of Andros from 1384 until his death in 1427, and a distinguished diplomat in the service of the Republic of Venice.

== Life ==
Pietro Zeno was the son of the Venetian bailo at Negroponte, also named Pietro Zeno. In early 1384 he married Petronilla Crispo, daughter of Francesco I Crispo, tenth Duke of the Archipelago, as part of the latter's attempt to secure Venetian recognition of his usurpation of the ducal throne after murdering his predecessor, Nicholas III dalle Carceri. According to the wedding agreement signed on March 1384, Pietro was to receive as his wife's dowry the islands of Andros and Syros; he was eventually infeoded with Andros on February 2, 1385.

Zeno was a very able diplomat; the historian of Frankish Greece William Miller calls him "a diplomatist of unrivalled experience in the tortuous politics of the Levant" and "the most useful diplomatist of the age". As a result, the Venetians employed him in several difficult and delicate negotiations. He played a role in the negotiations that saw the return of Argos to the Republic of Venice after its occupation by the Byzantine Despot of the Morea, Theodore I Palaiologos. In the aftermath of the Battle of Ankara in 1402 he was sent to the Ottoman court to seek Ottoman support against the Florentine adventurer Antonio I Acciaioli, who had recently captured Athens from Venice. Playing on Ottoman fears of a concerted Christian campaign against them in the aftermath of their disastrous defeat at Ankara, he managed to extract a number of concessions from Süleyman Çelebi in the Treaty of Gallipoli, concluded in January or early February 1403: Venice was granted a strip of territory on the Greek mainland opposite the whole length of the island of Euboea, which was a Venetian possession; the Northern Sporades were ceded to the Byzantines; the transfer of the County of Salona to the Knights Hospitaller was ratified; the tribute levied on the Marquisate of Bodonitsa was not raised; and finally the Sultan promised to restore Athens to Venice. In the event, the latter promise remained a dead letter, and Venice was forced to recognize Acciaioli rule over Athens a few years later. In 1404, Zeno visited England to seek the aid of Henry IV of England, but without any tangible success.

Despite his great diplomatic ability and prestige, even Zeno found it difficult to manoeuvre among the various competing powers of the era. Many islands were left destitute and almost depopulated by the repeated Ottoman raids. Andros managed to escape relatively unscathed, but in return Zeno was forced to pay tribute and provide harbour and shelter for the Turkish ships there. Nevertheless, in 1416, the island was raided and almost the entire population carried off by the Ottomans. At about the same time Albanians crossed from Euboea over into the island, settling in its northern part. In 1427, Pietro Zeno died, and was succeeded by his son Andrea, who was of poor health and only had a daughter. In 1437, Andrea too died, and the island was taken over by Venice, which installed a governor there until 1440, when its ownership was given to Crusino I Sommaripa.

== Sources ==
- Miller, William (1908). The Latins in the Levant: A History of Frankish Greece (1204–1566). London: John Murray.
- Setton, Kenneth M. (1976). The Papacy and the Levant (1204–1571), Volume I: The Thirteenth and Fourteenth Centuries. Vol. 1. Philadelphia: The American Philosophical Society. ISBN 0-87169-114-0.
- Setton, Kenneth M. (1978). The Papacy and the Levant (1204–1571), Volume II: The Fifteenth Century. Vol. 2. Philadelphia: The American Philosophical Society. ISBN 0-87169-127-2.
