= Antonio Crispo, Governor of the Duchy of the Archipelago =

Antonio Crispo (died after 1505) was a governor of the Duchy of the Archipelago between 1496 and 1505. He was the son of Giacomo Crispo.

He married NN and had a son:

- William Crispo (or Guglielmo; - 1555), married to NN, and had a son:
  - Antonio Crispo, Governor of the Duchy of the Archipelago
