= Zuan Francesco Venier =

Zuan Francesco Venier (died 1518) was a co-lord of Cerigo.

== Ancestry ==
He was a son of Moisé Venier (c. 1412 – c. 1476) and wife (married 1437) Caterina Vitturi, paternal grandson of Biagio Venier (died 1449) and wife (married 1406) Lucia Contarini, great-grandson of Antonio Venier.

== Marriage and issue ==
He married in 1479 Fiorenza Sommaripa, Lady of Paros (died 1518), and had Nicolò Venier, Lord of Paros and Cecilia Venier. He was also the Paternal Grandfather of Nurbanu Sultan (Cecilia Venier-Baffo), the Haseki Sultan of the Ottoman Empire, wife of Selim II, mother of Murad III and the Valide Sultan of the Ottoman Empire and is believed to be the maternal Great Grandfather of Ottoman Sultan Murad III.
