= Antonio Crispo, Governor of the Duchy of the Archipelago (died 1584) =

Antonio Crispo (died 1584) was a governor of the Duchy of the Archipelago between 1544 and 1554. He was the son of William Crispo (or Guglielmo; - 1555) and his unknown wife, and paternal grandson of Antonio Crispo.

He married a lady of the noble Greek Gavalas family from Rhodes, without issue.
