= Caterino Zeno =

Venetian politician and diplomat (1418–1478)

Caterino Zeno (12 July 1418 – 1478) was an Italian politician and diplomat of Republic of Venice, known for having been ambassador to Aq Qoyunlu's ruler Uzun Hassan.

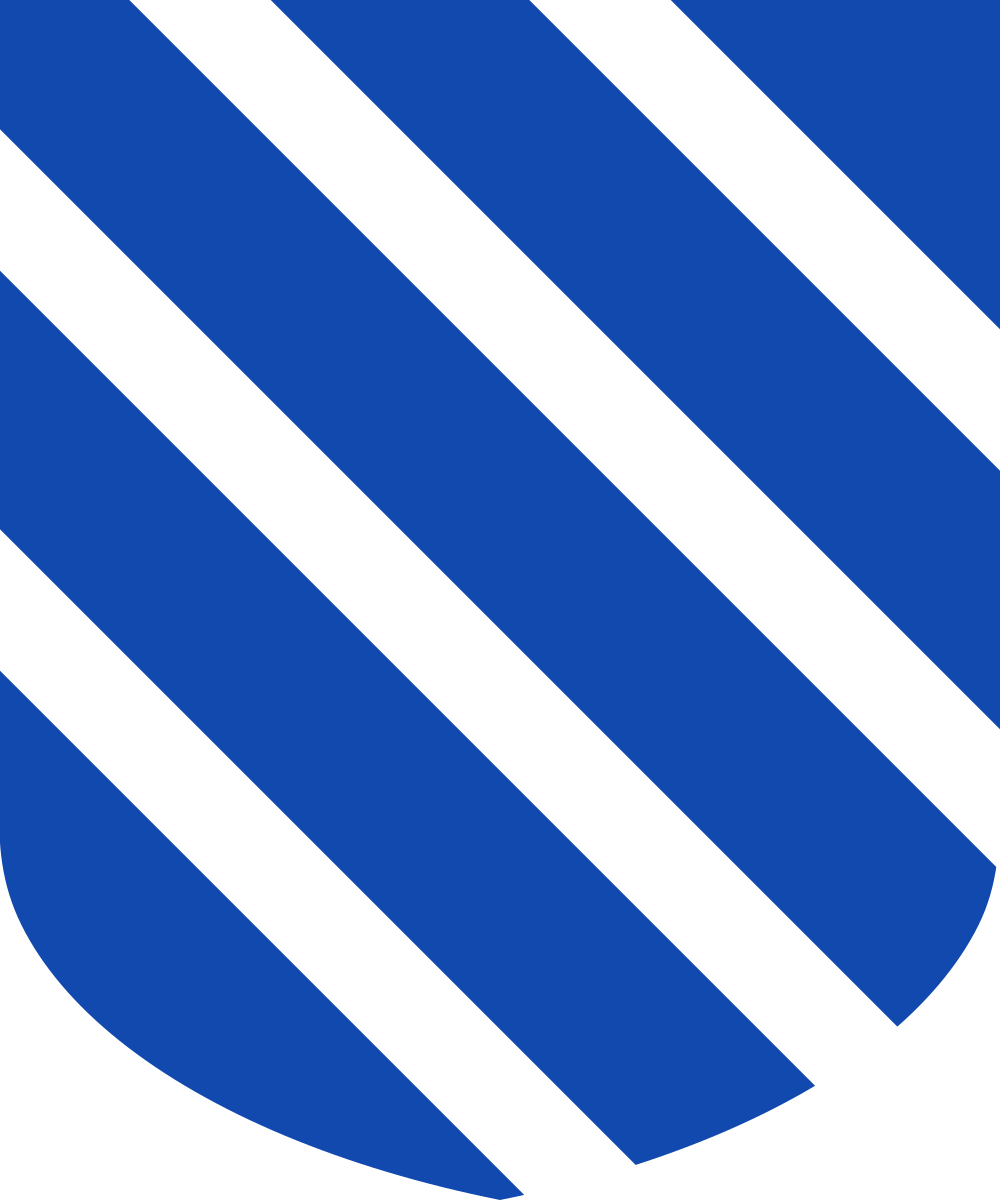
Zeno family's arms

== Biography ==
Caterino Zeno was born in Venice (Republic of Venice) on 12 July 1418. He was a member of the noble Zeno family, son of Dragone Pietro Zeno (died before 1430) and Anna Morosini di Giovanni, nephew of Doge Michele Morosini. He had two brothers, Antonio and Nicolò, and a sister, Antonia (who married Antonio Zorzi in 1439).

He was introduced into society on 2 December 1439 by his mother and his maternal uncles. In 1445 and 1446 he took part in expeditions to Alexandria and Tanais.

From 1448 he began to hold public offices: he was State Advocate for the minor curiae (1448–1450), he was elected numerous times to the Council of Forty (1448–1455) and was caposestiere of San Marco (1450).

In 1453 he married Violante Crispo, daughter of Nicolò Crispo. By her he had at least one son, Pietro (born in 1457, ambassador to Constantinople) and at least two daughters, Adriana (who married Federico Gradenigo in 1476) and another (who married Leone di Sommaripa, lord of Andros). For the merits acquired by Caterino, on 8 January 1476 the Republic of Venice assigned a dowry of 1,500 ducats to each of his daughters. However, it is uncertain whether he also had a second son named Octavian.

In 1455 Caterino financed a commercial route to Syria and Beirut, in 1463 he was captain of a ship and in 1467 port officer in Venice, responsible for the transport of goods.

On 7 March 1471, after two candidates declined, Caterino was chosen as ambassador to the Aq Qoyunlu ruler Uzun Hassan. The aim was to build an alliance against the Ottoman Sultan Mehmed II. Caterino was also chosen because his wife was said to be a relative of one of Uzun Hassan's consorts, the Byzantine princess Theodora Despina Komnene (but their relationship and their degree of kinship is still uncertain and unproven).

Caterino Zeno reached the Uzun's court in April 1472 and stayed for a year and a half. He became a personal friend of Uzun Hassan and also had friendly relations with Theodora Despina and her daughters, whom he also saw again in Damascus in 1473. Caterino Zeno laid the foundations of a solid alliance which survived even when he returned to Europe with Uzun Hassan's reply ( his place in Aq Qoyunlu was taken by Giosafat Barbaro and Ambrogio Contarini). During his return he risked being captured by the Ottomans and ran out of money, so much so that he had to give one of his servants as a slave to continue the journey. Before returning to Venice he sought further alliances with the Emperor Frederick III, the King of Poland Casimir II and the King of Hungary Matthias Corvinus, without great results, although King Matthias knighted him on 20 April 1474. In Venice, he expounded Uzun Hassan's response, introducing himself as "Magnificent Domino Caterino Zeno".

On 22 August 1474, Caterino took part in diplomatic missions to Rome and Naples. On 8 August he was elected governor of the revenue, a position he assumed in January 1475. On 29 September 1476 he was appointed to the Council of Ten, of which, in the following months, he was several times head or inquisitor; then, in May 1477, he was elected patron of the Arsenal, a position of great importance, traditionally entrusted to the former leaders of the Ten.

Caterino Zeno died before June 1478, probably of the plague. He was buried in the church of the Crociferi. He left a large amount of writings, reworked, expanded and published in 1558 by his great-grandson Nicolò, with the name of Commentari. Caterino's fame as a traveler also inspired fantastic literature such as Storia Curiosa by Vincenzo Formaleoni (1783).
