= Sozon of Cilicia =

Saint Sozon of Cilicia
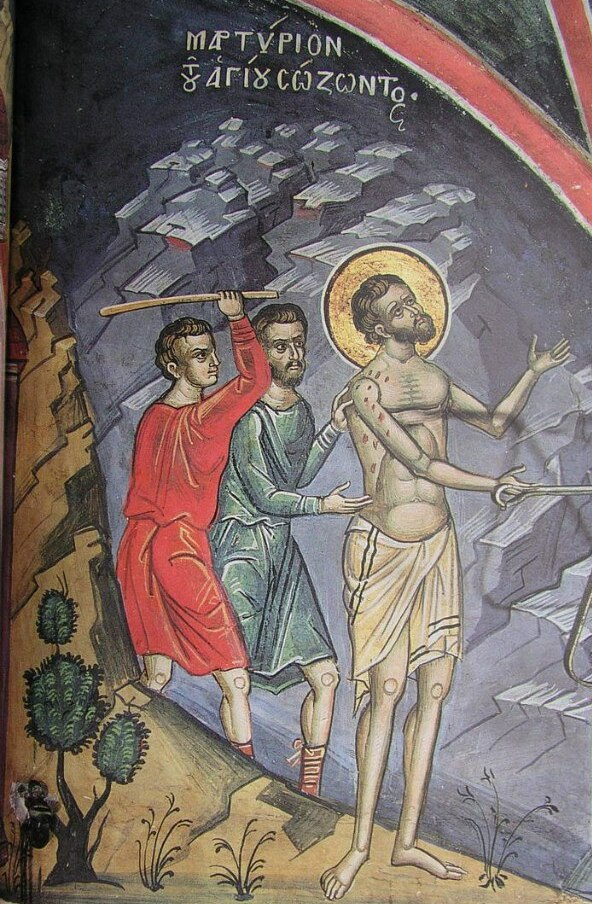
- Fresco of Saint Sozon's martyrdom from Dionysiou Monastery, 1547
- Born: 3nd century AD; Lycaonia
- Died: 304 AD; Cilicia
- Venerated in: Roman Catholic Church; Eastern Orthodox Church
- Feast: September 7 (Roman Catholic, Eastern Orthodox)
- Patronage: Lemnos, Greece

Sozon of Cilicia was an early Christian martyr from Lycaonia. Originally a pagan shepherd named Tarasios, he was baptised and received the name Sozon.

His feast day in the Orthodox Church is September 7. He is the patron saint of the island of Lemnos.

His feast day in the Catholic Church is also September 7, although he is referred to as Saint Sozonte of Pompeiopolis, a ruined city near modern Taşköprü, Turkey, in the 2004 Martyrologium Romanum.
