= Domenico Pisani =

Member of the Venetian nobility

Domenico Pisani was a Venetian nobleman and briefly the lord of the Aegean island of Santorini in 1479–1480.

He was the son of Giovanni Pisani, the Venetian Duke of Candia, and was chosen by the Duke of Naxos, Giacomo III Crispo, as the husband of his daughter Fiorenza. Giacomo III awarded Pisani the fief of Santorini as his daughter's dowry, on condition that no son was born to Giacomo III, whereupon the island would revert to the ducal domain. The festivities for the wedding at Milos and on Santorini itself were extravagant and lasted for an entire month. Pisani busied himself with restoring the island's agriculture and commerce, and placed his domain under the protection of his motherland, Venice; the Venetian Senate confirmed his possession of the island on 22 June 1480.

His good fortune was not to last, however, as Giacomo III died in the same year. As the duke had died without a son, this should have secured Pisani's possession of Santorini, but the new duke, Giacomo's brother Giovanni III Crispo—due to Salic Law, Pisani's wife could not inherit the duchy—landed on Santorini and occupied the island. Pisani and his wife turned to Venice for aid, but Giovanni III and his soldiers managed to repel a Venetian fleet attacking Skaros, the chief fortress of Santorini. In the end, after a complicated legal battle, the Venetian Senate resolved on 4 October 1486 that Santorini was to remain with Crispo, after paying compensation to the Pisani.

Domenico married Octavia Bon in 1489. They had two sons named Ottaviano and Giacomo. It is unclear which of Domenico's two wives was the mother of his three daughters, though their own marriage dates suggest that the first two were probably born to his first wife: Elisabetta (married 1504 Vittore Garzoni), Maria (married 1507 Girolamo Cappello) and Angela (married 1508 Girolamo Tagliapiera).

== Sources ==
- Frazee, Charles A.; Frazee, Kathleen (1988). The Island Princes of Greece: The Dukes of the Archipelago. Amsterdam: Adolf M. Hakkert. ISBN 90-256-0948-1.
- Jacoby, David (1971). La féodalité en Grèce médiévale: Les "Assises de Romanie", sources, application et diffusion (in French). Paris & The Hague: Mouton & Co. LCCN 70-150569.
- Miller, William (1908). The Latins in the Levant, a History of Frankish Greece (1204-1566). London Murray.

Vacant Union with the Duchy of Naxos	Lord of Santorini; 1479–1480	Vacant Union with the Duchy of Naxos
