= Anthony Crispo, Lord of Syros =

Anthony Crispo (or Antonio; - 1494), became Lord of Syros in 1463 after his older brother Francesco's death. He was the youngest son of Nicholas Crispo, Lord of Syros and Princess Eudokia Valenza Komnene, daughter of Emperor Alexios IV Komnenos of the Trebizond, and brother of Francesco II, sixteenth Duke of the Archipelago.

He married Conchita de Paterno Giustiniani Rocca co-Lord's of Chios with issue, Antonio Nicholas Crispo de Sira married to Taddea Sommaripa fled to Rhodes.
