= Giacomo II Crispo =

Italian noble (died 1447)

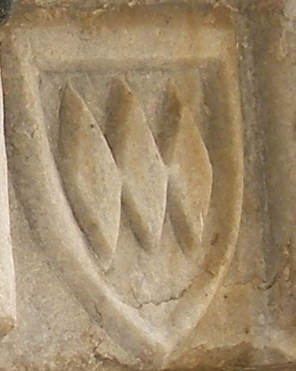

Giacomo II Crispo (or Jacopo) (d. 1447) was the thirteenth Duke of the Archipelago, etc., from 1433 to 1447.

He was the son of the twelfth Duke John II Crispo and Nobil Donna Francesca Morosini, Patrizia Veneta. He was a minor when he succeeded to the throne, and during his minority, he was under the guardianship of his mother Francesca, described as a "masterful woman", who continued to influence in the affairs of state during the reign of her son and grandson until the accession of William II to the throne in 1453, while the Duchy was ruled by his uncles William and Nicholas.

The reign of Giacomo II was reportedly a peaceful and prosperous one, as the Ottomans were occupied in Hungary, and Venice included the Duchy in their protection in their peace treaty with the Ottomans in 1446.

He married in 1444 Ginevra Gattilusio, daughter of Dorino I of Lesbos, and wife Orietta Doria, and had two children:

- Elisabetta Crispo (1445–14??), married in 1454 Dorino II of Ainos, without issue
- Gian Giacomo Crispo

Preceded by John II	Duke of the Archipelago; 1433–1447	Succeeded by Gian Giacomo
