= Gaspare Sommaripa =

Gaspare Sommaripa (died 1402) was a Lord of Paros by right of his wife.

== Marriage and issue ==
He married in 1390 Maria Sanudo, lady of Paros (died 1426), and had Crusino I Sommaripa, Lord of Paros, and Fiorenza Sommaripa, wife of Giacomo I Crispo, eleventh Duke of the Archipelago.
