= John IV Crispo =

Duke of the Archipelago (r. 1517–1564)

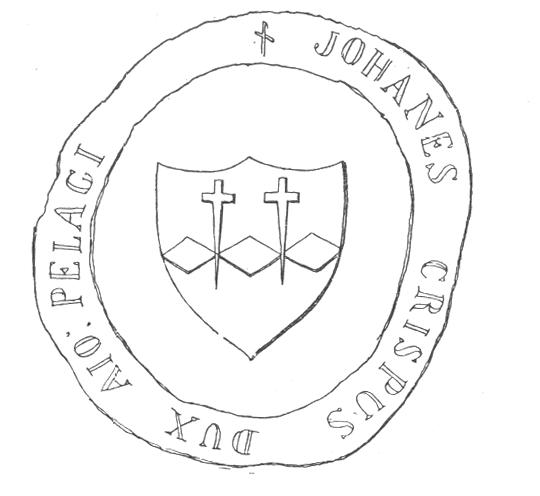
Seal of John IV Crispo

John IV Crispo or Giovanni IV (1500-1564), was the sovereign Duke of the Archipelago, ruling from 1517, when he succeeded Francesco III Crispo (r. 1500–11). He was succeeded in 1564 by the last Duke, Giacomo IV Crispo.

== Life ==
=== Early life ===
John IV Crispo was the son of Francesco III Crispo; his mother was Taddea Caterina Loredan, sister of Antonio Loredan. His father was reportedly insane, and in 1511, he murdered his mother in a fit of insanity. The murder caused a rebellion among the Naxians who deposed Francesco in favor of his eleven year old son. When told of the rebellion, his father reportedly attacked his son with a knife, and John IV was forced to flee from a balcony to escape his father. The Naxians asked the Republic of Venice for support against Francesco III, and the Venetians had Francesco seized and deported in captivity to Venetian Crete, while John IV was placed under the guardianship of his maternal uncle Antonio Loredan, who ruled the Duchy as Venetian governor during the minority of John IV.

=== Early reign ===
In 1517, John IV Crispo reached legal majority and the Venetian administration of the Duchy under his uncle ceased. Not long after this, he was abducted by a Turkish corsair while hunting. He was released by ransom and the support of Venice, but the ransom had a draining effect on his finances. A Venetian testimony described him: "The young duke, is surrounded by evil counsellors; his island is weak, his castle strong, but badly armed." He made an unsuccessful attempt to incorporate Paros in his domain, but the rights of Fiorenza Sommaripa was protected by his ally Venice. John IV Crispo supported the Knights of Rhodes during the Siege of Rhodes (1522) with provisions.

During the first decades of his reign, the Duchy was protected by the peace treaty between the Ottomans and Venice, as Venice was the ally and protector of the Duchy. It was tormented by corsairs, however. In 1532, the Turkish corsair Kurtoglu threatened Naxos, with a fleet of pirates, and Naxos was forced to buy itself free from looting, as was Paros and Sifanto.

In 1536, France and the Ottoman Empire made a treaty of alliance against Venice. The following year, war broke out between Venice and the Ottoman Empire, who attacked the Venetian islands and allies in Greece under command of Khaireddin Barbarossa. The Ottoman fleet under Barbarossa conquered one island after another; the Venetian islands of Cerigo and Egina, Cyclades, the principalities of Seriphos, Nio, Namfio, Antiparos, Stampalia and Amorgos, all ruled by Venetian dynasties, were all incorporated in the Ottoman Empire.

After the Ottomans took Paros in 1537, they attacked Naxos, the main island of the Duke of the Archipelago. Upon the sight of the Turkish fleet, the inhabitants all took refuge in the capital, leaving goods and chattels behind them. When the Ottomans landed, the island was looted and buildings destroyed. The Turkish commander sent a Christian emissary to the duke with the message: "If, you will voluntarily submit yourself and your islands to the emperor, already master of Asia and ere long of all Europe too, you may easily obtain his favour. If not, then I bid you expect his hatred and indignation. If you surrender, all your possessions shall be saved; but if you refuse, we will send you, your wife and children, your fellow-countrymen and subjects, to destruction to gether. We have a powerful fleet, a vigorous and victorious soldiery, and an admirable siege equipment. Take warning and counsel, then, from the Eginetans, the Parians, and the other lords of the Cyclades. You are fortunate to be able, if you choose wisely, to profit by the misfortunes of your neighbors." As it was not possible to resist, and no help from Europe was expected, John IV Crispo and his council on 5 November 1537 surrendered, promised to pay an annual tribute of 5000 ducats and subject to the sultan, to avoid slavery. Nevertheless, the Ottomans did loot the island of 25,000 ducats' worth of booty, and reportedly the duke "already foresaw that, unless Christendom would unite against the Turk, in a few years' time he would share the same fate which had, eighty years before, befallen the last Greek emperor of Constantinople".

The duke sent an appeal to "Pope Paul III.; the Emperor Charles V.; Ferdinand, King of the Romans; Francois I. of France; and the other Christian kings and princes", in which he urged to them to unite against their common enemy, the Ottoman sultan, who planned to conquer them all by separating them, to avoid sharing his fate. His appeal to the powers of Europe was however unsuccessful.

=== Later reign ===
After the Peace Treaty of 1540 between Venice and the Ottoman Empire, only very few states in the archipelago: the Duchy, Andros and Kythnos remained, and Venice were able to keep only a few of its former colonies, such as Crete and Tenos. With Ottoman support, John IV Crispo deposed the Premarini dynasty from their domain of Zia and bestowed it as well as Mykonos to his daughter upon her marriage to Gian Francesco Sommaripa of Andros.

After having become a vassal of the Ottomans, John IV Crispo experienced a growing unpopularity among the Greek population of the Duchy. The rule of the Latin Catholic crusader elite was not popular among the Greek Orthodox population, and when the Latin dynasties themselves were subjected to the Muslim Ottomans, their authority over the Greek quickly deteriorated, particularly since the duke was forced to raise taxes to pay the tributes due to the sultan. In 1559, a rebel by the name Mamusso of Candia proclaimed: "It was disgraceful, that so many valiant Greeks should allow their religion to be insulted and their country to be governed by a mere handful of Franks", and John IV banished the Orthodox metropolitan of Paronaxia for sedition and for supporting this view. The patriarch applied to the Ottoman grand vizier to oust the Catholic hierarchy, who had a bad reputation on the island because of its many scandals, and John IV therefore decided to only appoint local people to Catholic bishops and friars as they would be better accepted.

In 1563, the Duchy was described by a Venetian commissioner's report: "The islands of Zia, Siphnos, and Andros have their own lords (the Sommaripa and the Gozzadini), but are tributaries of the sultan; the other sixteen islands are under the duke, but of these, only five — Naxos, Santorin, Melos, Syra, and Paros — are inhabited. The Duke of Naxos, a man of nearly seventy, is, in point of dignity, the Premier Duke of Christendom; but, despite his title, he is duke more in name than in fact; for in all things the Grand Turk and his ministers are practically supreme. Every year, when the Turkish captains arrive, the duke's subjects bring their complaints against him before them, so that he dare not punish his own dependents for their crimes, nor even for their offences against his own person. He dresses and lives like a pauper, without the least pomp or princely expenditure; for, though he raises from 9000 to 10,000 ducats a year out of his islands, he has to pay 4000 ducats as tribute to the sultan, and his sole thought is how he can save money with which to bribe the Turkish captains and ministers. Under these circumstances, his administration is rather the shadow of a principality than a government."

During his later years of reign, he allowed his eldest son Francesco to participate in government, but he predeceased him, and he was therefore succeeded by his second son.

== Family ==
He was married to Adriana Gozzadini, related to the Gozzadini dynasty of Zia, which were traditional allies of Naxos.

1. Caterina, married to Niccolo III Gozzadini, Lord of Sifnos and Kythnos
2. Francesco, co-ruler, died before 1564, married to Fiorenza Gozzadini
3. Giacomo IV Crispo, married to Cecilia Sommaripa
4. Thaddea Crispo, married to Gian Francesco Sommaripa, Lord of Andros

Preceded by Francesco III	Duke of the Archipelago; 1517–1564	Succeeded by Giacomo IV Crispo
