= Crusino I Sommaripa =

Lord of the islands of Paros and Andros

Crusino I Sommaripa (died 1462) was lord of the islands of Paros and later Andros in the Duchy of the Archipelago.

== Life ==
Crusino was a son of Gaspare Sommaripa and Maria Sanudo. His mother was a daughter of the Duchess of the Archipelago Florence Sanudo and her second husband Nicholas II Sanudo, and half-sister of Nicholas III dalle Carceri, the last Duke of the Archipelago from the House of Sanudo. In December 1371, she received the island of Andros as a fief, but when Nicholas III was murdered in 1383 and Francesco I Crispo became the new duke, Andros was taken from her. Maria was compensated with the island of Paros in 1389, on condition that she marry the Veronese Gaspare Sommaripa, a politically insignificant parvenu. Through the intervention of Venice, Maria also succeeded her half-brother Nicholas III as lady of one third of the island of Euboea.

Crusino was a cultured man and an antiquarian; he entertained the fellow antiquarian and scholar Cyriacus of Ancona, who visited Paros often due to its famed marble quarries, with presentations of ancient statues that his men had excavated. On one occasion he even gifted him with the head and leg of an ancient statue, which Cyriacus sent to a friend, Andriolo Giustiniani-Banca of Chios.

In 1440, he recovered control of his mother's possession of Andros, following a Venetian court decision. He gave the nearby island of Antiparos to his son-in-law, a Loredan.

== Sources ==
- Miller, William (1908). The Latins in the Levant, a History of Frankish Greece (1204–1566). New York: E.P. Dutton and Company.
- Miller, William (1921). Essays on the Latin Orient. Cambridge: Cambridge University Press.
- Setton, Kenneth M. (1978). The Papacy and the Levant (1204–1571), Volume II: The Fifteenth Century. DIANE Publishing. ISBN 0-87169-127-2.

Preceded by Maria Sanudo	Lord of Paros; 1426–1462	Unknown
Vacant Venetian governance Title last held by Andrea Zeno	Lord of Andros; 1440–1462	Succeeded by Domenico Sommaripa
