= Giorgio Cornaro =

Italian noble

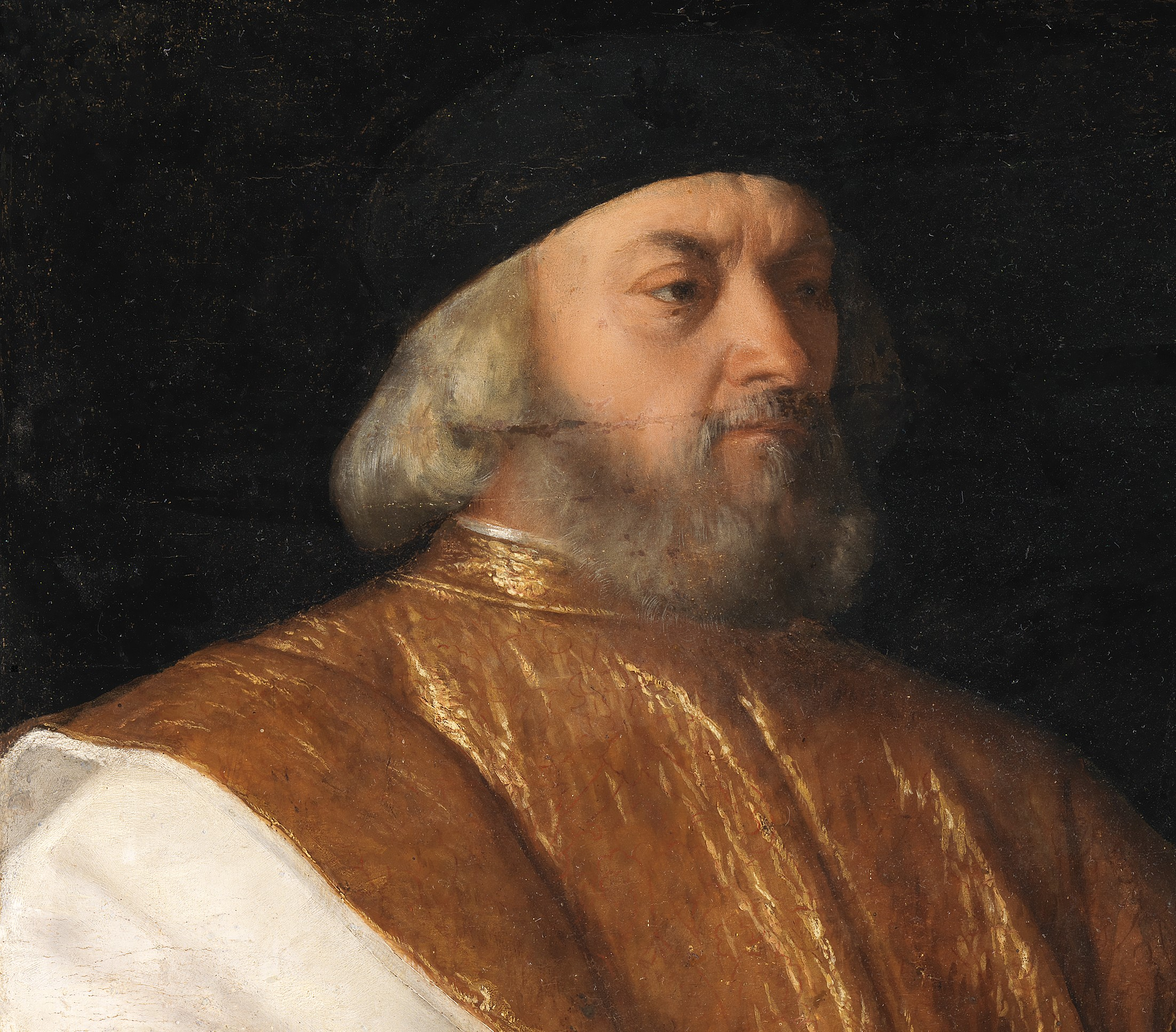
Portrait of Giorgio Cornaro from the National Gallery of Ireland

Nobil Huomo Giorgio Cornaro, called "Padre della Patria" (1452 – 31 July 1527) was a Venetian nobleman and politician.

== Life ==
Giorgio Cornaro was born in Venice in 1452. He was the son of Nobil Huomo Marco Cornaro and Fiorenza Crispo, daughter of Nicholas Crispo, Lord of Syros. His sister was Catherine Cornaro, Queen of Cyprus.

He married in Venice in 1475 Nobil Donna Elisabetta Morosini, Patrizia Veneta, and had an issue, called "Cornaro della Regina".

He died in Venice on 31 July 1527.

=== Offices ===
- Knight of the Holy Roman Empire,
- Patrician of the Republic of Venice,
- Podestà of Brescia in 1496,
- Procurator of St Mark's.

== Likeness ==
Giorgio is depicted in a double portrait, with his son Cardinal Francesco Cornaro, in the National Gallery of Ireland.
