= Castle of Antiparos =

- Κάστρο της Αντιπάρου
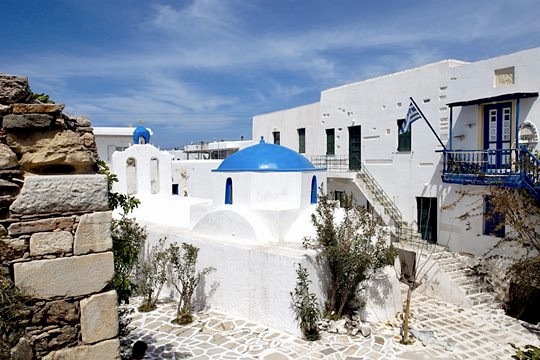
- Castle of Antiparos, built in 1440.

General information
- Address: Αντίπαρος 840 07
- Town or city: Antiparos
- Country: Greece
- Completed: 1440
- Affiliation: House of Loredan

Design and construction
- Developer: Giovanni Loredan, Lord of Antiparos

The Castle of Antiparos (Greek: Κάστρο της Αντιπάρου) is a 15th-century castle located on the Greek island of Antiparos in the South Aegean. It was built in 1440 by the patrician Loredan dynasty from Venice, namely Giovanni Loredan, who owned the island and brought inhabitants to it at his own expense.

== History ==
The noble Loredan family of Venice came into possession of the island of Antiparos in the 15th century when Giovanni Loredan married Maria Sommaripa. In 1440 he built the Castle and decided to bring inhabitants to the island which was until then largely unpopulated. The Castle, called Kastro in Greek, is located in the centre of Antiparos town. It was built as a single residence and is an excellent example of the type of fortified settlements which were built in the Cyclades during the period of the Latins, from the 13th to the 16th century.
