= Nicolò Venier =

Lord of Paros from 1520 to 1530

Lord of Paros
- Reign: 1520–1530
- Successor: Cecilia
- Born: c. 1483; Paros, Greece
- Died: c.1530 (aged 46–47); Paros, Greece
- Spouse: Zantano
- Issue: Andrea Venier; Nurbanu Sultan (?)
- Dynasty: House of Venier
- Father: Zuan Francesco Venier
- Mother: Fiorenza Sommaripa

Nicolò Venier (1483–1530) was the penultimate Lord of Paros from 1520 until his death in 1530. He is believed to have been the father of Nurbanu Sultan who served as the Haseki sultan and the Valide sultan of the Ottoman Empire and the maternal grandfather of Ottoman Sultan Murad III, born from an adulterous relationship with Violante Baffo. He was succeeded by his sister Cecilia Venier who became the last lord of the Paros until the Ottoman conquest and enslavement. He was the son of Zuan Francesco Venier, Co-Lord of Cerigo and his wife Fiorenza Sommaripa, Lady of Paros, and had a sister Cecilia, who succeeded him to the lordship of Paros.

In 1507 Venier married a woman named Zantano, by whom he had a son Andrea Venier, who died during his father's life. There are speculations that, Violante Baffo was the biological father of Italian concubine Cecilia Venier-Baffo, born from an adulterous relationship with Violante Baffo. who was captured and sold into slavery. Then she became Nurbanu Sultan, the wife of Sultan Selim IIand the queen mother of Sultan Murad III and a Prominent figure in the Ottoman History.
