= Francesco III Crispo =

Italian noble (died 1511)

Francesco III Crispo (died 1511) was the Duke of the Archipelago, ruling from 1500, when he succeeded John III Crispo (r. 1480–94) after an interregnum. He was succeeded in 1517 by John IV Crispo, after an interregnum that began in 1511.

Francesco III reportedly suffered from insanity, and was called "The Mad Duke". He was reportedly so cruel that his soldiers vowed that they would rather serve the Turks, and as the Turks were at this point a real threat to the island, Venice, who feared an Ottoman conquest, had Francisco removed and imprisoned at San Michele di Murano on the island in 1509. The following year, however, he famously attacked his wife Taddea Caterina Loredano, who fled to the house of Lucrezia Loredano of Nio, where he followed her the day after and attacked her again, now murdering her. The murder caused a riot which resulted in a coup by the Naxians, who deposed the duke in favor of his eleven-year-old son, John IV, and appealed to Venice for support against Francesco III. The Venetian authorities supported the coup and placed the new duke John IV under the regency of his maternal uncle Antonio Loredano during his minority, and took the deposed duke to Venetian Crete, where he died soon after.

== Family ==
He was married to Taddea Caterina Loredano and had issue:

1. John IV Crispo
2. Catherine, married to Gianluigi Pisani, Lord of Chios

Preceded by John III	Duke of the Archipelago; 1500-1511	Succeeded by John IV Crispo
