= John III Crispo =

Duke of the Archipelago from 1480 to 1494

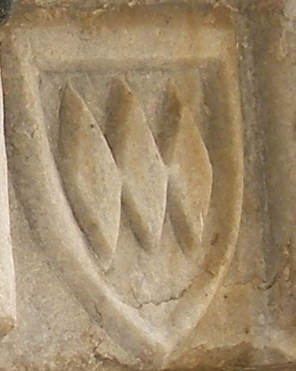
Crispi Coat of Arms

John III Crispo (Italian: Giovanni III Crispo) was the eighteenth Duke of the Archipelago, ruling from 1480 when he succeeded his brother, Giacomo III Crispo (r. 1463–1480).

Shortly after this, he reincorporated Santorini, which had been ruled by Domenico Pisani, husband of his niece Fiorenza Crispo, into the Duchy. His raising of taxes made him very unpopular among the Greek population of Naxos, however. They rebelled under their own magnates (archontes), and the Crispi and the other Catholic families loyal to them were shut in the island's citadel (Kastro) and were besieged by the rebels. Only the timely arrival of galleys from the Knights Hospitaller of Rhodes rescued Crispo and put an end to the revolt.

The discontent did not subside, however, and in 1494 John was killed, apparently by poison, by the locals, who sent an embassy to Venice requesting for the Republic to assume control of the island, as John's sole heir, his son Francesco III Crispo, was underage. In the end, Francesco assumed his father's position in 1500.

== Family ==
He was married to a Morosini and had issue:

1. Francesco III Crispo

Giovanni (John) also had a Mistress, his cousin, Maria Crispo, daughter of Anthony Crispo Lord of Syros (Sira).

They had issue:

1. A daughter, name currently unknown.
1. A son, Nicholas Antonio Crispo de Syra (Sira). married to Taddea Sommaripa fled to Rhodes Island circa 1520.

1.6 Giorgio Crispo de Syra (de Sira), de Jure Signore di Syra, (1540 -), Official of the Order of St John in Malta 1550, married (1) (c. 1550) to Norella de Fantino, married Malta (2) (c. 1585) to Leonora N, with issue.

== Sources ==
- Frazee, Charles A.; Frazee, Kathleen (1988). The Island Princes of Greece: The Dukes of the Archipelago. Amsterdam: Adolf M. Hakkert. ISBN 90-256-0948-1.

Preceded by Giacomo III Crispo	Duke of the Archipelago; 1480–1494	Vacant Venetian regency Title next held by Francesco III Crispo
