= Gavalas =

Gavalas or Gabalas (Greek: Γαβαλάς), feminine form Gavala/Gabala (Γαβαλά), is a Greek family name. It can refer to:

- Jabalah IV ibn al-Harith (died 528), Ghassanid Arab phylarch, known as Gabalas in Greek sources
- Leo Gabalas (fl. 1240s), autonomous ruler of Rhodes and other islands after the Fourth Crusade
- John Gabalas (fl. 1250s), brother and successor of the above
- Panos Gavalas (1926–1988), Greek singer

== See also ==
- Gavalou
- Gavalochori
