= Gian Giacomo Crispo =

Italian noble (1446-1453)

Gian Giacomo Crispo (1446–1453) was the fourteenth Duke of the Archipelago, etc., from 1447 to 1453, son of the thirteenth Duke Giacomo II Crispo and Ginevra Gattilusio.

== Life ==
He was born six weeks after the death of his father, succeeded him as an infant, and thus needed a regency during his minority. His paternal grandmother, the dowager Duchess Francesca Morosini, who had exercised great influence during the regency of his father, claimed the regency, but Niccolo of Syra and Santorin and William of Anaphe had her imprisoned and resumed regency with the support of Venice. When Niccolo died, Francesca Morosini, the archbishop and the Naxians elected his son Francesco in his place in the regency and successfully asked Venice to ratify it.

He died at only age six or seven. In accordance with the marriage contract of his paternal aunt Adriana Crispo, spouse of Domenico Sommaripa of Andros, she would succeed her brother if he died without heirs, making her the legal heir of her nephew. However the late duke's cousin Francesco of Santorin, and grand-uncle William II, both wanted to succeed themselves and contested the rights of Adriana by applying the Salic Law, and it was the latter of the three candidates who was given the support of Venice, who wished to avoid civil war because of the Ottoman threat.

In the agreement, William II, who had a daughter but now son, would also make his male contestant, Francesco of Santorin, his heir in Naxos, while his daughter would inherit his fief Anaphe; Adriana Crispo would have the support and protection of his fleet in a time when the Greek island were plagued by Corsairs. After the succession of William II, the dowager duchess Francesca retired to Venice after having founded the church and monastery of St Antonio dedicated to the Knights of St John in 1452.

Preceded by Giacomo II	Duke of the Archipelago; 1447–1453	Succeeded by William II
