= Fiorenza Sommaripa =

Latin noblewoman

Fiorenza Sommaripa (died after 1520) was a Latin noblewoman of the Aegean islands.

== Life ==
She was a daughter of Nicolò I Sommaripa and his spouse, a woman from the da Pesaro family, whose first name is unknown.

She married in 1479 the Venetian Zuan Francesco Venier, Co-Lord of Cerigo (died 1518).

Her brother Crusino succeeded their father in Paros at the latter's death ca. 1505. He died without issue in late 1517 or early 1518; since he hated her, he had bequeathed the island to a relative, Polimeno Sommaripa.

The island of Paros was thus disputed among several pretenders, including the Duke of Naxos who claimed it as its overlord after the extinction of its successoral line. However, the Republic of Venice did not wish to see Paros incorporated with Naxos and took it from Naxos claiming that Venice would hold it until the matter of succession could be solved by a senate of experts in Venice.

The senate decided in July 1520 that Fiorenza Venier was its rightful heir and attributed the island to her, which introduced a Venetian dynasty in Paros. She gave the island to her son the same year. She is also the Paternal Grandmother of Nurbanu Sultan (Cecilia Venier-Baffo), Haseki sultan of the Ottoman Empire, legal wife of Sultan Selim II, mother of Sultan Murad III and the Valide sultan of the Ottoman Empire and believed to be maternal great grandmother of Otttoman Sultan Murad III.

Issue

1. Nicolò Venier, Lord of Paros, lord in 1520-1530.
2. Cecilia Venier, lady in 1531-1537.
