= John II Crispo =

Italian noble (died 1433)

John II Crispo (or Giovanni; d. 1433) was the twelfth Duke of the Archipelago, etc., from 1418 to 1433, son of the tenth Duke Francesco I Crispo and wife Fiorenza I Sanudo, Lady of Milos and brother of Giacomo I and William II.

He married ca. 1420 Nobil Donna Francesca Morosini, Patrizia Veneta (–1455), and had three children:

- Adriana Crispo, married to Domenico Sommaripa (–1466)
- Giacomo II Crispo
- Caterina Crispo (d. before 1454), unmarried and without issue

Preceded by Giacomo I	Duke of the Archipelago; 1418–1433	Succeeded by Giacomo II
