= Giacomo III Crispo =

Italian noble (died 1480)

Giacomo III Crispo (died 1480), was the seventeenth Duke of the Archipelago, ruling from 1463 when he succeeded Francesco II Crispo (r. 1463). He was succeeded in 1480 by Giovanni III Crispo.

== Life ==
Giacomo III Crispo was born to Francesco II Crispo, who died the same year he succeeded his uncle because of a serious illness. He succeeded his father as a minor with his mother Petronilla Bembo as regent during his minority. There were concerns that his uncle Antonio of Syra would take control of the regency.

His reign was affected by the Ottoman–Venetian War of 1463–1479, when the Ottoman fleet repeatedly attacked the islands in the Greek archipelago and abducted the inhabitants into slavery. In 1477, Naxos were also attached and largely occupied until the Peace of 1479 between Venice and the Ottomans, when the Duchy was respected as a Venetian ally and its inhabitants treated as Venetians.

In 1480, the peace was celebrated alongside the wedding of his daughter to Domenico Pisani, son of the Duke of Candia, to which he bestowed the island of Santorini; the wedding took place during the carnival and was described as the most splendid festivities in the history of the duchy. Giacomo III Crispo had not son, and because the Salic Law had been applied in the Duchy, he was not succeeded by his daughter, but by his brother John III.

== Family ==
He was married to Caterina Gozzadini and had issue:

1. Daughter, married to Domenico Pisani, Lord of Santorini

Preceded by Francesco II	Duke of the Archipelago; 1463-1480	Succeeded by Giovanni III
