= Domenico Sommaripa =

Domenico Sommaripa (d. 1466) was a Lord of Andros, first of a branch of the Sommaripa family known as Sommaripa of Andros.

== Ancestry ==
He was a son of Crusino I Sommaripa, and wife.

== Marriage and issue ==
He married Adriana Crispo, daughter of John II Crispo, twelfth Duke of the Archipelago, and wife Nobil Donna Francesca Morosini, Patrizia Veneta, and had three sons :

- Giovanni Sommaripa, lord of Andros from 1466, killed around 1468 in a Turkish attack on Andros
- Crusino II Sommaripa, lord of Andros from 1468 to his death around 1500
- Francesco Sommaripa, lord of Andros in 1506 but dispossessed after a few months

He was succeeded by his eldest son Giovanni.

Preceded by Crusino I Sommaripa	Lord of Andros; 1462–1466	Succeeded by Giovanni Sommaripa
