= Gozzadini =

Gozzadini is an Italian surname. Notable people with the surname include:

- Angelo I Gozzadini (died between 1468 and 1476), Lord of Kythnos
- Angelo Gozzadini (1573–1653), Roman Catholic prelate
- Bettisia Gozzadini (1209–1261), Italian jurist
- Francesco Gozzadini (died 1673), Roman Catholic prelate
- Giovanni Gozzadini (1810–1887), Italian archaeologist
- Iakovos Gozadinos (1716–1786), Greek bishop of Gothia
- Marcantonio Gozzadini (1574–1623), Italian cardinal, cousin of Pope Gregory XV
- Maria Teresa Gozzadini (1812–1881), Italian geologist and countess
- Tommaso Gozzadini (1260–after 1329), Italian notary
- Ulisse Giuseppe Gozzadini (1650–1728), Italian cardinal and bishop of Imola
