= Giacomo I Crispo =

Italian noble (died 1418)

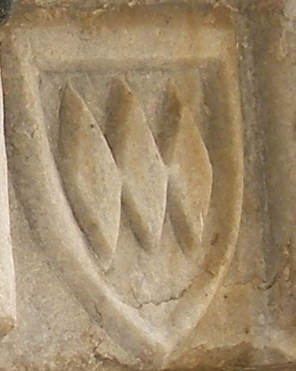

Giacomo I Crispo (or Jacopo) (d. 1418) was the eleventh Duke of the Archipelago, etc., from 1397 to 1418, son of the tenth Duke Francesco I Crispo and wife Fiorenza I Sanudo, Lady of Milos, and brother of John II and William II.

He married his cousin Fiorenza Sommaripa, daughter of Gaspare Sommaripa, and wife Maria Sanudo.

According to William Miller, Giacomo died of the flux at Ferrara while travelling to meet Pope Martin V at Mantua. He was involved in arranging the retrocession of Corinth to the Byzantine Empire by the Knights of St. John prior to his death. In his will, Giacomo introduced the Salic Law to the Duchy by excluding his daughter from succession and making his brother John II Crispo his heir and successor.

Preceded by Francesco I	Duke of the Archipelago; 1397–1418	Succeeded by John II
