= Francesco I Crispo =

Tenth Duke of the Archipelago

Francesco's coat of arms

Francesco I Crispo, Patrizio Veneto (died 1397) was the tenth Duke of the Archipelago through his marriage and the will of Venice.

== Biography ==
=== Early life ===
Francesco Crispo was probably born in Verona. He was Lord of Milos, thus a vassal to the Duke of Naxos, as well as his cousin through his marriage to Fiorenza Sanudo, a granddaughter of the Duke Guglielmo Sanudo. Crispo might also have been a pirate. He was sent by the Republic of Venice to Naxos in March 1383 for concern that the then Duke Niccolò III dalle Carceri was incompetent. The Republic suffered from predation by the Ottoman Empire in the Aegean.

=== Duke of Naxos ===
On the island, a hunt was suggested. Officially, on the way back, Niccolo III, escorted by Crispo's men, was attacked by rebels or thieves. He fell off his horse and died. To quench any revolt, Francesco Crispo had to assume power.

The Republic of Venice quickly sent its congratulations.

Andros was another problem. It belonged to Maria Sanudo, sister of the late duke. When Francesco gave as a dowry Andros and Syros to his own daughter Pétronilla, Maria Sanudo called for justice in Venice.

== Personal life ==
With his wife, he had eight children:

- Giacomo I Crispo
- Petronilla Crispo (1384–1427), married to Pietro Zeno, together they received Andros and Syros as dowry
- Agnese Crispo (1386–1428), married to Dragonetto Clavelli, Lord of Nisyros
- John II Crispo
- William II Crispo
- Nicholas Crispo, Lord of Syros
- Marco I Crispo, Lord of Ios
- Nobil Huomo Pietro Crispo, Patrizio Veneto (1397–1440), married to NN and had issue:
  - Giovanni Crispo (died 1475), Knight of the Knights Hospitaller

== Bibliography ==
- (in English) Frazee, Charles A. (1988). The Island Princes of Greece: The Dukes of the Archipelago. Amsterdam: Adolf M. Hakkert. ISBN 90-256-0948-1
- (in English) Hetherington, Paul (2001). The Greek Islands: Guide to the Byzantine and Medieval Buildings and their Art. London: Quiller. ISBN 1-899163-68-9
- (in French) Slot, B. (1982). Archipelagus turbatus: Les Cyclades entre colonisation latine et occupation ottomane. c.1500-1718. [Istanbul]: L'Institut historique-archéologique Néerlandais de Stamboul. ISBN 90-6258-051-3

Preceded by Nicholas III	Duke of the Archipelago; 1383–1397	Succeeded by Giacomo I
