= Niccolò Sommaripa =

Niccolò Sommaripa (died ca. 1505) was lord of Paros.

He was lord of Paros and in 1503 attacked Andros, ruled by a different branch of the Sommaripa family. He died ca. 1505, and was succeeded by his son Crusino.

== Sources ==
- Setton, Kenneth M. (1984). The Papacy and the Levant (1204–1571), Volume III: The Sixteenth Century to the Reign of Julius III. Philadelphia: The American Philosophical Society.
