= Francesco II Crispo =

Italian noble (died 1463)

Francesco II Crispo (died 1463) was the sixteenth Duke of the Archipelago, ruling for less than one year in 1463 when he succeeded his uncle William II Crispo (r. 1453-63). He was succeeded in 1463 by his son Giacomo III Crispo under the regency of his widow Petronilla Bembo.

== Family ==
He was married to Petronilla Bembo and had issue:

1. Giacomo III Crispo
2. Giovanni III Crispo

| Preceded by William II | Duke of the Archipelago; 1463 | Succeeded by Giacomo III Crispo |
