= Giovanni Sommaripa =

Lord of Andros island

Giovanni Sommaripa (died 1468) was the lord of Andros island from 1466 until his death in battle against the Ottomans in 1468. He was a son of Domenico Sommaripa. He was succeeded by his brother, Crusino II Sommaripa.

== Sources ==
- Miller, William (1908). The Latins in the Levant: A History of Frankish Greece (1204–1566). London: John Murray. OCLC 563022439.
- Setton, Kenneth M. (1978). The Papacy and the Levant (1204–1571), Volume II: The Fifteenth Century. Philadelphia: The American Philosophical Society. ISBN 0-87169-127-2.

Preceded by Domenico Sommaripa	Lord of Andros; 1466–1468	Succeeded by Crusino II Sommaripa
