= Giacomo IV Crispo =

Last Duke of the Archipelago

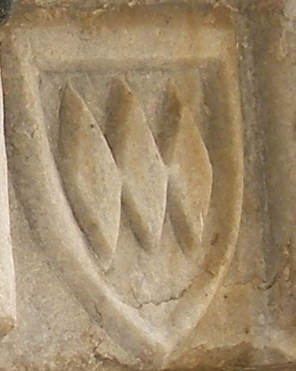

Giacomo IV Crispo (died 1576) was the last Duke of the Archipelago from 1564 to 1566.

He succeeded his father, Giovanni IV Crispo (r. 1517–64). In reality, he acknowledged himself in a letter from 1565 that he had little power: "We are now tributaries of the great emperor, Sultan Suleyman, and we are in evil plight, because of the difficulties of the times; for now necessity reigns with embarrassment and pain for her ministers; and, like plenipotentiaries or commissioners of others, we husband our opportunities as fate doth ordain."

When the duchy was attributed to Joseph Nasi in 1566, he fled to Venice, to which he ceded his titles to the duchy and whose service he entered. He served as an officer in the Ottoman–Venetian War of 1570–1573 over Cyprus and died in Venice in 1576.

He was married to Cecilia Sommaripa and had three daughters and three sons.

Preceded by Giovanni IV	Duke of the Archipelago; 1564–1566	Succeeded by Joseph Nasi as Ottoman representative
