= Crusino II Sommaripa =

Crusino II Sommaripa (died ca. 1500) was the lord of Andros from 1468, succeeding his brother Giovanni.

== Sources ==
- Setton, Kenneth M. (1978). The Papacy and the Levant (1204–1571), Volume II: The Fifteenth Century. Philadelphia: The American Philosophical Society. ISBN 0-87169-127-2.

Preceded by Giovanni Sommaripa	Lord of Andros; 1468– ca.1500	Unknown Title next held by Niccolò Sommaripa
