= Fiorenza I Sanudo, Lady of Milos =

Lady of Milos

Fiorenza Sanudo (died after 1397) was lady of the island of Milos in Frankish Greece.

She was a daughter of Marco Sanudo, Lord of Milos.

She married Francesco I Crispo in 1383, who later became the tenth Duke of the Archipelago, and they had issue.
