= William II Crispo =

Italian noble (1390-1463)

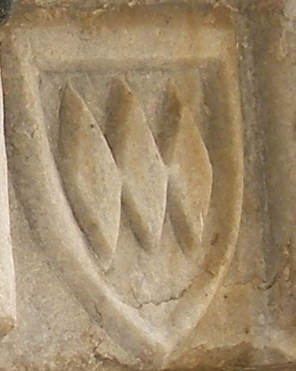

William II Crispo (Guglielmo in Italian; 1390–1463) was the fifteenth Duke of the Archipelago, from 1453 to 1463. He was the son of the tenth Duke Francesco I Crispo and his wife Fiorenza I Sanudo, Lady of Milos.

== Reign ==
William had just taken control of the Duchy when Constantinople fell to the Ottomans. As a citizen of Venice, he had himself included in the treaty between Venice and the Ottoman Empire, which provided him with a measure of protection. He also signed a treaty with Sultan Mehmed II that recognized him as Duke and to live in peace and harmony with the Porte; he also received the right to fly the flag of St. Mark in his realm. Nevertheless, eventually Sultan Mehmed pressured him into paying tribute to him, and it was only by bowing to the Sultan's demands that William was able to hold on to his realm until his death.

He was succeeded by his nephew Francesco II.

== Family ==
William Crispo married in 1461 or 1462 Nobil Donna Elisabetta da Pesaro, Patrizia Veneta, and their only child was:

- Fiorenza Crispo (1463–1528), married Nobil Huomo Luigi Barbaro, Patrizio Veneto
- He also had an illegitimate son, Giacomo Crispo, Governor of the Duchy of the Archipelago from 1494.

| Preceded by Gian Giacomo | Duke of the Archipelago; 1453–1463 | Succeeded by Francesco II |
