= Duchy of the Archipelago =

Crusader state in the Cyclades (1207–1579)

Coordinates: 37°06′N 25°22′E

Duchy of the Archipelago Δουκάτο του Αρχιπελάγους (Greek) Ducato dell'arcipelago (Italian) Ducato de l'arcipelago (Venetian)
- 1207–1579
- Coats of arms of the two ruling houses of the Duchy, the House of Sanudo (1207–1383, left) and House of Crispo (1383–1566, right)

- Duchy of Naxos, 1450, highlighted within the Aegean Sea
- Status: Client state*
- Capital: Naxos
- Common languages: Italian and Venetian officially, Greek popularly
- Religion: Roman Catholic, Greek Orthodox popularly
- Government: Feudal Duchy
- Duke
  - 1207–27: Marco I Sanudo
  - 1383–97: Francesco I Crispo
  - 1564–66: Giacomo IV Crispo
  - 1566–79: Joseph Nasi
- Historical era: Middle Ages
  - Sack of Constantinople: 1204
  - Duchy established: 1207
  - Crispo coup d'état: 1383
  - Ottoman suzerainty: 1537
  - Expropriated by Murad III: 1579
Preceded by	Succeeded by
Byzantine Empire	Sanjak of Nakşa Berre
- * The duchy was a client state of, in order, the Latin Emperors at Constantinople, the Villehardouin dynasty of princes of Achaea, the Angevins of the Kingdom of Naples and (after 1418) the Republic of Venice. From 1566–79, the duchy was administered as a part of the Ottoman Empire before total annexation.

The Duchy of the Archipelago (Greek: Δουκάτο του Αρχιπελάγους, romanized: Doukáto tou Archipelágous, Italian: Ducato dell'arcipelago, Venetian: Ducato de l'arcipelago), also known as Duchy of Naxos or Duchy of the Aegean, was a maritime state created by Venetian interests in the Cyclades archipelago in the Aegean Sea, in the aftermath of the Fourth Crusade, centered on the islands of Naxos and Paros. It included all the Cyclades (except Mykonos and Tinos). In 1537, it became a tributary of the Ottoman Empire, and was annexed by the Ottomans in 1579; however, Christian rule survived in islands such as Sifnos (conquered by the Ottomans in 1617) and Tinos (conquered in 1715).

== Background and establishment of the Duchy ==
The Italian city-states, especially the Republic of Genoa, Pisa, and Venice, had been interested in the islands of the Aegean long before the Fourth Crusade. There were Italian trading colonies in Constantinople and Italian pirates frequently attacked settlements in the Aegean in the 12th century. After the collapse and partitioning of the Byzantine Empire in 1204, in which the Venetians played a major role, Venetian interests in the Aegean could be more thoroughly realized.

The Duchy of the Archipelago was created in 1207 by the Venetian nobleman Marco Sanudo, a participant in the Fourth Crusade and nephew of the former Doge Enrico Dandolo, who had led the Venetian fleet to Constantinople. This was an independent venture, without the consent of the Latin emperor Henry of Flanders. Sanudo was accompanied by Marino Dandolo and Andrea and Geremia Ghisi (as well as Filocalo Navigajoso, possibly). He arranged for the loan of eight galleys from the Venetian Arsenal, set anchor in the harbour of Potamides (port) (now Pyrgaki, in the southwest of Naxos), and largely captured the island.

The Naxiotes continued to resist, however, and established a base inland, around the fortress of Apalyros/Apalire. The latter fell to Sanudo after a five or six weeks' siege, despite the assistance rendered to the Greeks by the Genoese, Venice's main competitors.

With the entire island occupied in 1210, Sanudo and his associates soon conquered Melos and the rest of the islands of the Cyclades, and he established himself as Duke of Naxia, or Duke of the Archipelago, with his headquarters on Naxos. Sanudo rebuilt a strong fortress and divided the island into 56 provinces, which he shared out as fiefs among the leaders of his men, most of whom were highly autonomous and paid their own expenses. Navigajoso had been granted his island domain by Henry of Flanders and was technically a vassal of the Latin Empire; Sanudo himself recognized the Latin Empire's authority rather than making the Duchy a vassal of Venice. The conqueror himself ruled for twenty years (1207–27). He held in his personal possession Paros, Antiparos, Milos, Sifnos, Kythnos, Ios, Amorgos, Kimolos, Sikinos, Syros, and Pholegandros.

Sanudo's fellow crusaders conquered lordships of their own, sometimes as vassals of Sanudo, e.g. Dandolo on Andros. Although they are often considered to have become Sanudo's vassals as well, the Ghisi brothers, who held Tinos, Mykonos, and the Northern Sporades (Skiathos, Skyros, Skopelos) never recognized the suzerainty of Sanudo. Instead, like him, they were directly vassals of the Latin Emperors. Some families thought earlier to have settled at this time in the islands were in fact established later, in the 14th century (Barozzi etc.) or the 15th (Querini). Further south, Kythera (or Cerigo), held by Marco Venier, and Antikythera (or Cerigotto), held by Jacopo Viaro chose to become vassals of Venice.

== Administration, faith and economics ==
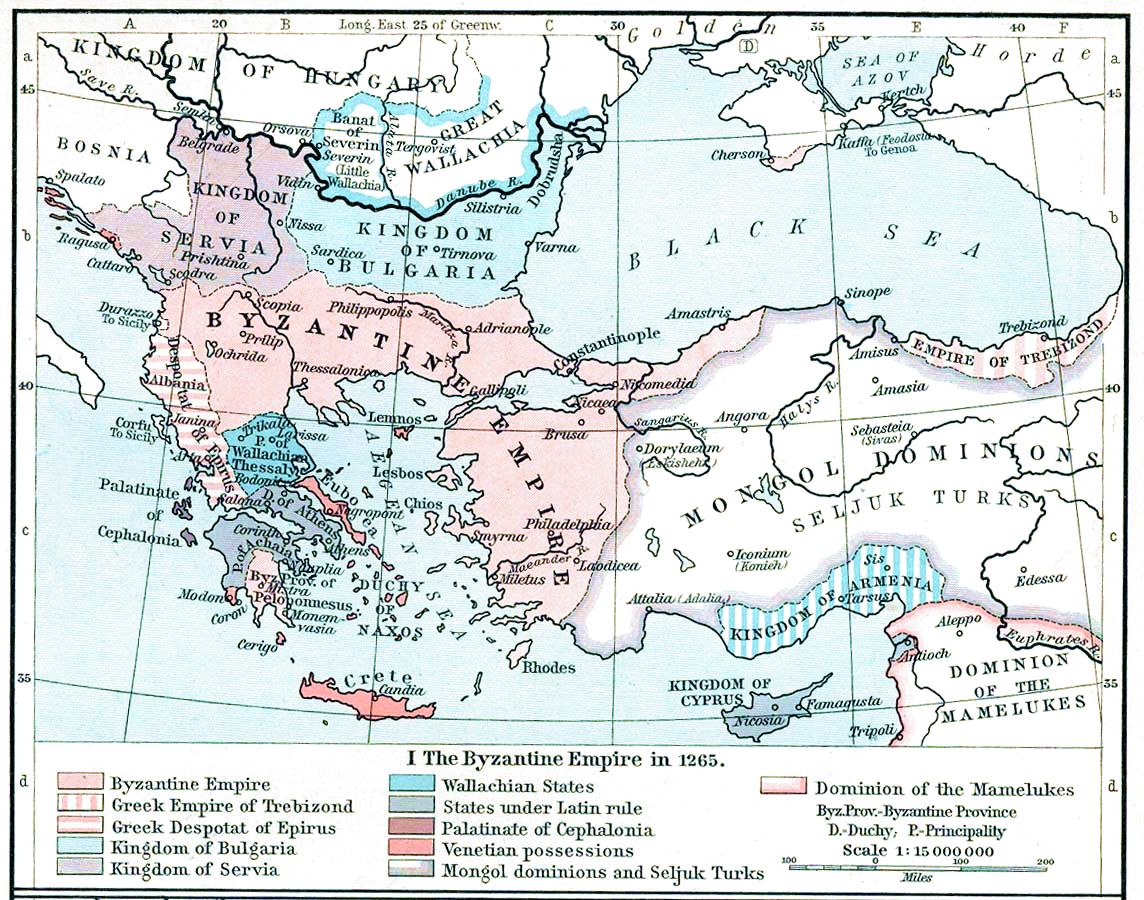
The Duchy of Naxos and states in the Morea, carved from the Byzantine Empire, as they were in 1265 (William R. Shepherd, Historical Atlas, 1911)

The institution of European feudalism caused little disruption to the local islanders, who were familiar with the rights of a landowner class under the Byzantine system of the pronoia. The significant legal distinctions between the Byzantine pronoia and feudalism were of little immediate consequence for those who farmed the land or fished the waters in question. In most cases, the local population submitted relatively peacefully to the authority of their new Venetian lords. Sanudo and his successors prudently followed a conciliatory course with their Byzantine subjects, granting even fiefs to certain among them, in an effort to bind them to the dynasty.

The Venetians brought the Catholic Church with them, but, as they were a minority of habitually absentee landowners, most of the population remained Greek Orthodox. Marco Sanudo himself established a Latin archbishopric on Naxos, but in contrast to his successors, did not attempt to forcibly convert the Greek Orthodox majority. These moves consisted primarily of imposing restrictions on Orthodox clergy and the exclusion of Orthodox Christians from positions of authority.

The islands were of great importance in Venetian grand strategy, with their valuable trade routes to Anatolia and the Eastern Mediterranean, which the Venetians could now control. Aside from providing safe travelling routes to Venetian ships, the Venetians also exported corundum and marble, which they mined on Naxos, to Venice. Certain Latin feudal rights survived on the island of Naxos and elsewhere until they were abrogated in 1720 by the Ottomans.

== Later history ==
Twenty-one dukes of the two dynasties ruled the Archipelago, successively as vassals of the Latin Emperors at Constantinople, of the Villehardouin dynasty of princes of Achaea, of the Angevins of the Kingdom of Naples (in 1278), and after 1418 of the Republic of Venice.

In 1248, the suzerainty of the Duchy was nominally granted by the Latin Emperor Baldwin II to William of Villehardouin, Prince of Achaea. Marco II Sanudo lost many of the islands, except Naxos and Paros, to the forces of the renewed Byzantine Empire under the admiral Licario in the late 13th century. The Byzantine revival was to prove short-lived, though, as they relinquished control of their gains in 1310.

In 1317 the Catalan Company raided the remnants of the Duchy; in 1383, the Crispo family led an armed insurrection and overthrew Sanudo's heirs as Dukes of Archipelago. Under the Crispo dukes, social order and agriculture decayed, and piracy became dominant. It officially became a vassal of Venice in 1418 in reaction to the Rise of the Ottoman Empire.

== Collapse and Ottoman conquest ==
Eastern Mediterranean in 1450

Before the last Latin Christian duke, Giacomo IV Crispo, was deposed in 1566 by Ottoman Sultan Selim II, he was already paying the Sultan tribute. The Sultan's appointed representative, the last Duke of Archipelago (1566–79) was a Portuguese Jew (Marrano), Joseph Nasi.

Latin Christian rule did not come to a complete end on that date: the Gozzadini family in Bologna survived as lords of Sifnos and other little islands in the Cyclades until 1617, and the island of Tinos remained Venetian until 1714. The last Venetian ports in Morea (the Peloponnese) were captured in 1718. Gaspar Graziani, a Dalmatian nobleman, was awarded the title of Duke of the Archipelago by the sultan in 1616, but the island was again under direct Ottoman rule at the end of 1617; he was the last to hold the title.

== Legacy and influence ==
Today, Cyclades islands such as Syros and Tinos have some entirely Catholic villages and parishes, while many Greeks from the Cyclades have surnames with a distinctly Italo-Venetian origin e.g. Venieris, Ragousis, Dellaportas, Damigos etc.

== Dukes of the Archipelago ==
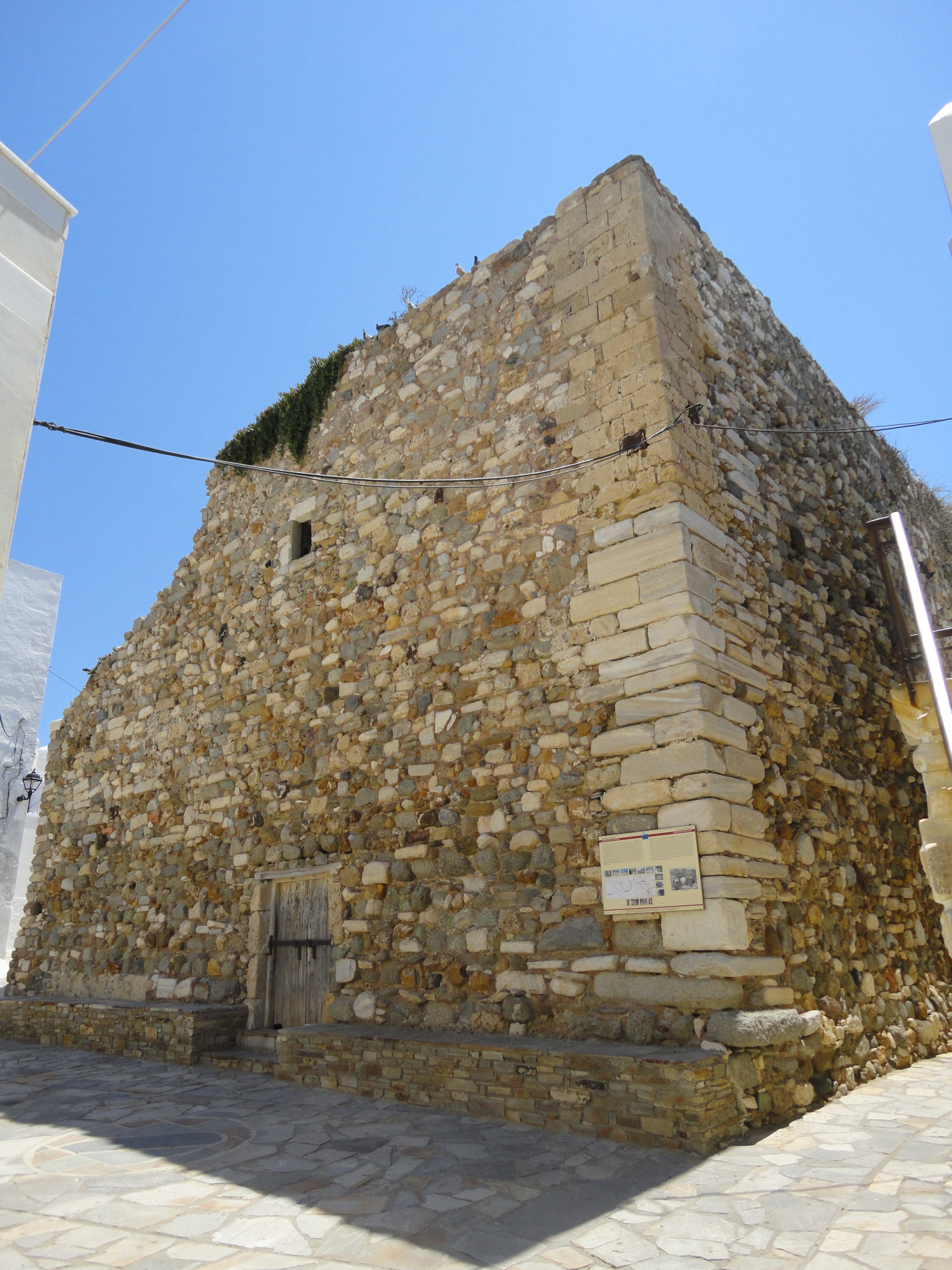
Sanudo Tower, Chora of Naxos

=== Sanudo dynasty ===
- Marco I Sanudo (1207–27)
- Angelo (1227–62)
- Marco II (1262–1303)
- Guglielmo I (1303–23)
- Niccolò I (1323–41)
- Giovanni I (1341–62)
- Fiorenza (1362–71)
- Niccolò II (1364–71)
- Niccolò III dalle Carceri (1371–83)

=== Crispo dynasty ===
- Francesco I Crispo (1383–97)
- Giacomo I (1397–1418)
- Giovanni II (1418–33)
- Giacomo II (1433–47)
- Gian Giacomo (1447–53)
- Guglielmo II (1453–63)
- Francesco II (1463)
- Giacomo III (1463–80)
- Giovanni III (1480–94)

(interregnum)

- Francesco III (1500–11)

(interregnum)

- Giovanni IV (1517–64)
- Giacomo IV (1564–66)

=== Ottoman ducal appointments ===
- Joseph Nasi (1566–1579)
- Gaspar Graziani (1616-1617)

== See also ==
- Byzantine Greece

== Sources ==
- Frazee, Charles A.; Frazee, Cathleen (1988). The Island Princes of Greece: The Dukes of the Archipelago. Amsterdam: Adolf M. Hakkert. ISBN 90-256-0948-1.
- Sansaridou-Hendrickx, Thekla; Hendrickx, Benjamin (2013). "The Post-Ducal 'Dukes of Naxos' of the 'per Dignità First Duchy of Christendom': A Re-Examination and Assessment". Journal of Early Christian History. 3 (2): 94–107. doi:10.1080/2222582X.2013.11877287. S2CID 164042809.
- Longnon, Jean (1969) [1962]. "The Frankish States in Greece, 1204–1311". In Setton, Kenneth M.; Wolff, Robert Lee; Hazard, Harry W. (eds.). A History of the Crusades, Volume II: The Later Crusades, 1189–1311. Vol. 2 (Second ed.). Madison, Milwaukee, and London: University of Wisconsin Press. pp. 234–275. ISBN 0-299-04844-6.
- Miller, William (1908). The Latins in the Levant: A History of Frankish Greece (1204–1566). London: John Murray.
- Miller, William (1921). Essays on the Latin Orient. Cambridge: Cambridge University Press.
- Setton, Kenneth M. (1976). The Papacy and the Levant (1204–1571), Volume I: The Thirteenth and Fourteenth Centuries. Vol. 1. Philadelphia: The American Philosophical Society. ISBN 0-87169-114-0.
- Setton, Kenneth M. (1978). The Papacy and the Levant (1204–1571), Volume II: The Fifteenth Century. Vol. 2. Philadelphia: The American Philosophical Society. ISBN 0-87169-127-2.
- Setton, Kenneth M. (1984). The Papacy and the Levant (1204–1571), Volume III: The Sixteenth Century to the Reign of Julius III. Vol. 3. Philadelphia: The American Philosophical Society. ISBN 0-87169-161-2.
- Loenertz, Raymond-Joseph (1975). Les Ghisi, dynastes vénitiens dans l'Archipel (1207-1390) (in French). Florence: Olschki.
