= War of the Euboeote Succession =

1256–1258 war in Greece

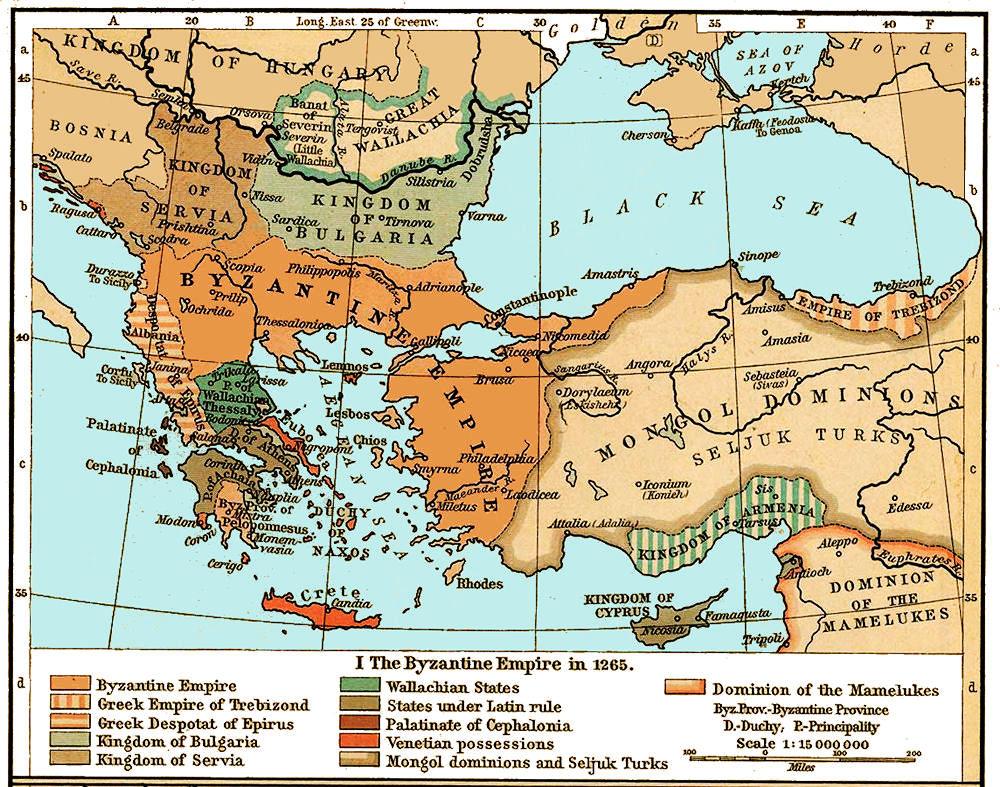
- Map of the Byzantine Empire and Latin Romania in 1265
Date	1256–1258
Location	Euboea, Central Greece, Peloponnese
Result	Achaean victory

Belligerents
Principality of Achaea; Republic of Genoa	Republic of Venice; Lordship of Athens and Thebes; Triarchs of Negroponte; Lordship of Salona; Marquisate of Bodonitsa

Commanders and leaders
William II of Villehardouin	Guglielmo of Verona; Narzotto dalle Carceri; Paolo Gradenigo; Marco Gradenigo; Guy I de la Roche (surrendered)

The War of the Euboeote Succession was fought in 1256–1258 between the Prince of Achaea, William of Villehardouin, and a broad coalition of other rulers from throughout Frankish Greece who felt threatened by William's aspirations. The war was sparked by Villehardouin's intervention in a succession dispute over the northern third of the island of Euboea, which was resisted by the local Lombard barons (the "triarchs") with the aid of the Republic of Venice. The Lord of Athens and Thebes, Guy I de la Roche, also entered the war against William, along with other barons of Central Greece. Their defeat at the Battle of Karydi in May/June 1258 effectively brought the war to an end in an Achaean victory, although a definite peace treaty was not concluded until 1262.

== Background ==
Following the Fourth Crusade, southern Greece had been divided among several Latin lordships, the most powerful of which was the Principality of Achaea, which controlled the entire Peloponnese peninsula. William of Villehardouin, who in 1246 had succeeded his elder brother as prince, was a most energetic ruler, who aimed to expand and consolidate his rule over the other Latin states. Guy I de la Roche, the "Great Lord" of Athens and Thebes, was already his vassal for the fief of Argos and Nauplia, which lay in the Peloponnese, and William was also suzerain of the three Lombard baronies (terzieri, lit. 'thirds') of Negroponte (the medieval name of the island of Euboea).

Another claimant to overlordship over Euboea was the Republic of Venice. Already in 1209, when all of Euboea was still under the rule of Ravano dalle Carceri, it had been granted trade privileges and the right to establish quarters in every town of the island, while the lord of Euboa pledged to send each year a tribute and a rich garment to the Doge of Venice as token of its suzerainty. Venetian influence was strengthened in 1216, when the local Venetian governor, the bailo, intervened in the succession disputes that ensued after Ravano's death. To satisfy all claimants, the bailo divided the island's 'thirds' in two parts, with the proviso that if one of the co-rulers of each third died, the other co-ruler would succeed, rather than the first co-ruler's heirs.

In 1255, the southern triarchy was held by Guglielmo of Verona, the central triarchy by Narzotto dalle Carceri, while the northern triarchy of Oreos was held by Carintana dalle Carceri, who died in that year. Carintana is commonly considered by modern historians to have been the second wife of William of Villehardouin, based on the work by the 19th-century scholar Karl Hopf, but this has been proven as erroneous by Raymond-Joseph Loenertz. Her husband's fate is unknown—if he was even alive at the time—but he was excluded from the succession by a pact between the triarchs, that dispossessed any heirs in favour of the surviving triarchs. Carintana's inheritance was apparently claimed by a relative, Leone dalle Carceri, and his sons, but was rejected by the other two triarchs. In response, Leone lodged a complaint with William of Villehardouin, in the latter's capacity as the triarchs' suzerain. Older historical works, following Hopf's conjecture, claimed that Villehardouin claimed the northern triarchy for himself.

== Formation of the anti-Achaean alliance ==
According to the Venetian historian Marino Sanudo, in early 1256 Villehardouin called upon Guglielmo and Narzotto to present themselves to him. Constrained by their feudal oaths of fealty, they did so and were imprisoned by the Achaean prince. Villehardouin proceeded to occupy Oreos and the northern triarchy, as well as the part of the city of Negroponte (modern Chalcis) that belonged to the triarchs—i.e., apart from the Venetian quarter there. The triarchs' wives, accompanied by many knights and other kinsmen, then went to the Venetian bailo, Paolo Gradenigo, and beseeched his aid. "Moved alike by policy and sympathy", as the historian William Miller states, Gradenigo assented, and with his men attacked Villehardouin's men and evicted them from the city of Negroponte. Sanudo portrays this as the origin of the Venetian assistance to the triarchs, and claims that the triarchs remained imprisoned until after Villehardouin himself was captured at the Battle of Pelagonia in 1259, but this may in fact reflect a brief imprisonment, since the two triarchs were clearly at liberty in June 1256 and January 1257.

In early 1256, a new bailo, Marco Gradenigo, was sent to Negroponte with three galleys (seven, according to Andrea Dandolo). On 14 June 1256, a treaty was signed between the Lombard triarchs and Gradenigo at Thebes, the chief residence of Guy I de la Roche. The triarchs repudiated their vassalage to Achaea and declared themselves lieges of the Commune of Venice, as token of which they would send an annual gift of cloths of gold to Venice, one each for the Doge and St. Mark's Cathedral, and hold festive liturgies in Venice's honour at Christmas, Easter, and the feast-day of St. Mark. The previous agreements of 1209 and 1216 were renewed, but, while the triarchs and their domains were freed from any duties and the considerable tribute that they paid to Venice until then, they in turn gave up the rights to all customs revenue to the Republic. Venice also received further concessions, such as the right to regulate the weights, measures and scales for all Euboea, and privileges for its citizens. More importantly, the triarchs ceded to the Republic full possession of the strategic citadel that guarded the bridge over the Euripus Strait, and of extensive properties in the city of Negroponte itself. This marked the establishment of a separate Venetian colony in Negroponte, and began the long and gradual process whereby the entirety of the city and island of Negroponte would pass entirely under Venetian rule.

Faced with the opposition of Venice, Villehardouin turned to her rival, Genoa, for support. The Genoese, ever eager to thwart the Venetians, and owing a debt for Villehardouin's assistance to them at Rhodes a few years before, readily accepted. Based at Monemvasia, four Genoese-crewed galleys preyed upon Venetian shipping. Othon de Cicon, the lord of Karystos in southern Euboea, in control of the strategic passage of the Cavo D'Oro, also sided with Villehardouin. Elsewhere, however, Villehardouin's appeals were met with hostility and mistrust, due to the Achaean ruler's claims of suzerainty over all the Latin princes of southern Greece. From the summer of 1256, Guy I de la Roche and his kinsman William de la Roche, had joined the Lombard–Venetian camp, although they were both vassals to the Villehardouins (Guy as Lord of Argos and Nauplia and his brother as baron of Veligosti and Damala). They were joined by the Lord of Salona, Thomas II d'Autremencourt, and Ubertino Pallavicini, Marquis of Bodonitsa.

In October 1256, Gradenigo received full authority to deal with the triarchs as he saw fit. On 25 January 1257, at the city of Negroponte, Gradenigo and the triarchs concluded a full alliance against Villehardouin, with both sides undertaking not to conclude a separate peace without consulting the other.

== Contest for Negroponte ==
Villehardouin responded by sending his nephew, the baron of Karytaina, Geoffrey of Briel, who recaptured the city of Negroponte and launched devastating raids in Euboea. After arriving in Greece, Marco Gradenigo laid siege to the city, which dragged on for thirteen months. The assistance of the de la Roche brothers proved critical in forcing its capitulation in early 1258. An Achaean counterattack was repulsed by Venetian pike-wielding infantry sallying forth and defeating the famed Achaean cavalry before the city's walls. At some point, the anti-Achaean league was also joined by Geoffrey of Briel, deemed "the best soldier in all the realm of Romania [i.e. Latin Greece]"; Geoffrey was the son-in-law of Guy I of Athens.

== Battle of Karydi and the end of the war ==
William of Villehardouin responded by what William Miller described as "restless activity": he unsuccessfully besieged the Venetian fortress of Coron, and led a raid into Attica, where he was nearly captured, before resolving on launching a full-scale invasion of the de la Roche domains. His army assembled at Nikli, crossed the Isthmus of Corinth, and at the pass of Mount Karydi, on the way from Megara to Thebes, his army decisively defeated the coalition army. Guy de la Roche and the other barons fled the field and found refuge in the citadel of Thebes. William of Villehardouin followed after them and prepared to lay siege to the city, but relented after the Latin archbishop of the city and many of his own nobles pleaded to show restraint and end the conflict. After extracting a pledge by Guy de la Roche to appear before the Achaean High Court, the assembly of the Achaean barons, and be judged, William's troops withdrew.

The High Court quickly assembled at Nikli. Guy de la Roche presented himself before it accompanied by his own knights, but the assembled barons decided that they did not have the authority to judge him, and referred the matter to King Louis IX of France (r. 1226–1270). Guy travelled to France in 1259, but Louis not only pardoned him, but awarded him the title of duke, which he and his successors were to bear thereafter. The renegade Geoffrey of Briel too was brought for judgement before William, and it was only the determined and passionate intercession of the other barons that saved his life and secured a pardon from the vengeful prince. He was however deprived of the possession of his domains by the inalienable right of conquest, and retained them henceforth as a gift from the Prince, meaning that they would be forfeit upon his death unless he had any immediate descendants.

== Aftermath ==
William's victory at Karydi, coupled with a victory of his troops against the Venetians near Oreos, brought an effective end to the conflict; on 6 August 1258, Guglielmo da Verona and Narzotto dalle Carceri consented to begin negotiations for peace through the Doge of Venice, and in early 1259, the Doge authorized the new bailo, Andrea Barozzi, to sign a treaty with William. But due to William's subsequent involvement in the great Epirote-Achaean-Sicilian alliance against the Empire of Nicaea, his defeat and capture at Pelagonia and his captivity at the hands of the Byzantine emperor Michael VIII Palaiologos (r. 1259–1282), a final peace treaty was delayed until William's release in 1262.

The treaty, signed at the residence of the Archbishop of Thebes, essentially restored the status quo ante bellum: William recognized Guglielmo, Narzotto, and Guglielmo's nephew Grapella as triarchs, and they in turn swore their allegiance to him. The fortress of Negroponte was razed, but Venice retained and even increased its quarter in the city, as well as retaining its exclusive right to levy customs in Euboea, except for the triarchs, the Prince, and their agents. Thus, Venice retained some of its 1256 gains, but overall the treaty was regarded as a setback, in view of the considerable expenses incurred. For some time afterwards, Venice was content to exercise her financial privileges, and refrained from meddling with the island's politics.

== Sources ==
- Dourou-Iliopoulou, Maria (2005). Το Φραγκικό Πριγκιπάτο της Αχαΐας (1204-1432). Ιστορία. Οργάνωση. Κοινωνία. [The Frankish Principality of Achaea (1204-1432). History. Organization. Society.] (in Greek). Thessaloniki: Vanias Publications. ISBN 960-288-153-4.
- Fine, John V. A. (1994) [1987]. The Late Medieval Balkans: A Critical Survey from the Late Twelfth Century to the Ottoman Conquest. Ann Arbor, Michigan: University of Michigan Press. ISBN 978-0-472-10079-8.
- Loenertz, Raymond-Joseph (1965). "Les seigneurs tierciers de Négrepont de 1205 à 1280". Byzantion (in French). 35 (1): 235–276. JSTOR 44169159.
- Longnon, Jean (1969) [1962]. "The Frankish States in Greece, 1204–1311". In Setton, Kenneth M.; Wolff, Robert Lee; Hazard, Harry W. (eds.). A History of the Crusades, Volume II: The Later Crusades, 1189–1311. Vol. 2 (Second ed.). Madison, Milwaukee, and London: University of Wisconsin Press. pp. 234–275. ISBN 0-299-04844-6.
- Miller, William (1908). The Latins in the Levant: A History of Frankish Greece (1204–1566). London: John Murray.
- Setton, Kenneth M. (1976). The Papacy and the Levant (1204–1571), Volume I: The Thirteenth and Fourteenth Centuries. Vol. 1. Philadelphia: The American Philosophical Society. ISBN 0-87169-114-0.
