= Dalle Carceri =

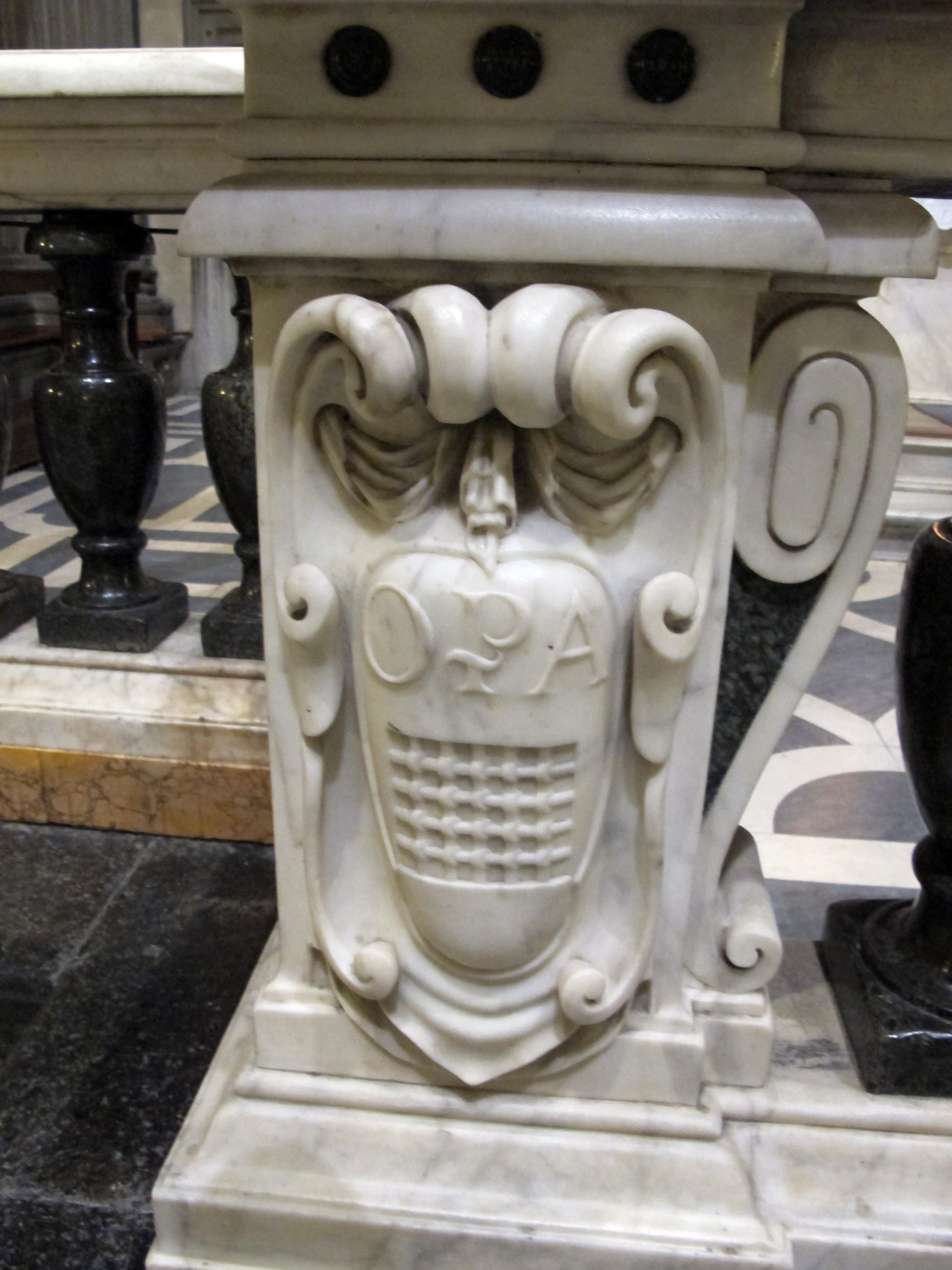
Coat of arms of Dalle Carceri family

The dalle Carceri (Greek: Ντάλε Κάρτσερι) were a noble family of Verona and Frankish Negroponte (modern Euboea) from the 12th to the 14th century.

== History ==
They came to Greece with the Fourth Crusade (1202). After being found guilty of the murder of Mastino della Scala in 1277, the dalle Carceri were banished from Verona.

== Notable members ==
- Giberto dalle Carceri, Triarch of Negroponte 1205–1209
- Ravano dalle Carceri, Triarch 1209–1216
- Isabel dalle Carceri, widow of Ravano, Triarch 1216–1220
- Rizzardo dalle Carceri (or Ricardo), son of Ravano, Triarch 1216–1220
- Merino I dalle Carceri (or Marino), ruled 1216–1255, son of Ravano
- Bertha dalle Carceri, daughter of Ravano
- Guglielmo I dalle Carceri, Triarch 1255–1263
- Carintana dalle Carceri, Triarch, wife of William II of Villehardouin
- Narzotto dalle Carceri, Triarch
- Grapella dalle Carceri, Triarch 1262–1264
- Guglielmo II dalle Carceri, Triarch 1263–1275
- Marino II dalle Carceri, Triarch 1264–1278
- Giberto II dalle Carceri, Triarch 1275–1279
- Alice dalle Carceri (Alix), wife of George I Ghisi, granddaughter of Ravano
- Maria dalle Carceri, Marchioness of Bodonitsa
- Peter dalle Carceri (Pietro), Triarch of Negroponte and Baron of Arcadia
- Giovanni dalle Carceri, son of Pietro, Lord of Negroponte 1340–1359
- Nicholas III dalle Carceri (Niccolò), Duke of the Archipelago and Lord of Negroponte 1359–1383

== Bibliography ==
- James Rennell Rodd, The Princes of Achaia and the Chronicles of Morea: A Study of Greece in the Middle Ages, two volumes, London, 1907 full text
- "List of Rulers", Frankokratia project
