= Guglielmo II da Verona =

Guglielmo II da Verona (died 1273/1275) was a Lombard noble from the triarchy of Negroponte (Euboea), considered by earlier historians as a triarch and a marshal of the principality of Achaea in Frankish Greece.

He was the second son of Guglielmo I da Verona, ruler of the southern third ("triarchy") of Euboea.

According to earlier historians following K. Hopf, he succeeded to this position upon his father's death in 1263/6. He was also thought to have become Baron of Passavant and marshal in the Principality of Achaea from an hypothetical marriage to Margaret de Neuilly, because he was improperly called "marshal" in Sanudo's Istoria di Romania. These views have been challenged by Raymond-Joseph Loenertz in the 1960s.

He married Catherine, a niece of William II of Villehardouin, with whom he had no known child.

Guglielmo was killed in the Battle of Demetrias, which took place either in 1273 or in 1275 in the area of modern Volos.

== Sources ==
- Bury, John Bagnell (1886). "The Lombards and Venetians in Euboia (1205–1303)". The Journal of Hellenic Studies. 7: 309–352. doi:10.2307/623649. JSTOR 623649. S2CID 166238367.
- Geanakoplos, Deno John (1959). Emperor Michael Palaeologus and the West, 1258–1282: A Study in Byzantine-Latin Relations. Cambridge, Massachusetts: Harvard University Press. OCLC 1011763434.
- Raymond-Joseph Loenertz, Les seigneurs tierciers de Négrepont, Byzantion, vol. 35, 1965, re-edited in Byzantina et Franco-Graeca : series altera
