= Battle of Demetrias =

Sea battle in 1270s

- Part of the Byzantine-Latin Wars
- Map of the Byzantine Empire and the Latin states in southern Greece c. 1278
Date	1272/1273 or 1274/1275
Location	Demetrias (modern Volos, Greece) 39°21′0″N 22°56′30″E
Result	Byzantine victory

Belligerents
Byzantine Empire	Lordship of Negroponte; Venetian Crete

Commanders and leaders
Alexios Philanthropenos (WIA); John Palaiologos	Guglielmo da Verona †; Fillippo Sanudo (POW)

Strength
50–80 ships	30–62 ships

Casualties and losses
Heavy	Very heavy

The Battle of Demetrias was a sea engagement fought at Volos in Greece in the early 1270s between a Byzantine fleet and the assembled forces of the Latin barons of Euboea (Negroponte) and Crete. The battle was fierce, and initially in favour of the Latins, but the timely arrival of Byzantine reinforcements tipped the scale, resulting in a crushing Byzantine victory.

== Background ==
In the aftermath of the Fourth Crusade and the dissolution of the Byzantine Empire in 1204, the Aegean Sea, once Byzantium's naval heartland, was dominated by a hodgepodge of Latin principalities, protected by the naval might of the Republic of Venice. Following the recapture of Constantinople and the restoration of the Byzantine Empire in 1261, one of the chief priorities of Emperor Michael VIII Palaiologos (r. 1259–1282) was the defence of his capital from a Venetian attack. Consequently, he sought an alliance with Venice's major antagonist, the Republic of Genoa, while he began building up his own navy.

With the aid of his newly constructed fleet, in 1263 Palaiologos sent an expedition to the Morea, against the Principality of Achaia. At the verge of victory, the Byzantine land forces were surprised and defeated, while the joint Byzantine-Genoese fleet was dealt a severe blow by a numerically inferior Venetian fleet at the Battle of Settepozzi. This led to the abandonment of the Genoese alliance by Michael, who initiated a rapprochement with Venice, leading to a five-year peace treaty in 1268. With the neutralisation of the Republic of Venice, the major threat to imperial interests in the Aegean were the Lombard corsairs based at Negroponte. The island was repeatedly attacked by the Byzantine fleet under Alexios Philanthropenos, but no permanent gains were achieved. Only from 1273, with the aid of the Latin renegade Licario, did Byzantine forces make headway, capturing a number of fortresses on the island.

In the early 1270s (the exact date is uncertain, most recent scholars favour 1272/3 or 1274/5), Michael VIII Palaiologos launched a major campaign against John I Doukas, ruler of Thessaly. It was to be headed by his own brother, the despotes John Palaiologos. To prevent any aid coming to him from the Latin principalities, he also dispatched a fleet of 73 ships, led by Philanthropenos, to harass their coasts. The Byzantine army, however, was defeated at the Battle of Neopatras with the aid of troops from the Duchy of Athens. At the news of this, the Latin lords took heart, and resolved to attack the Byzantine navy, anchored at the port of Demetrias.

== Battle ==
The opposing fleets' numbers are unclear. For the Byzantines, Nikephoros Gregoras writes of "over 50" vessels, while the Italian Marino Sanudo mentions 80 imperial ships. The joint Latin fleet, composed of Lombard and Venetian vessels from Negroponte and Venetian-held Crete, is variously given at 30 (Gregoras) to 62 (Sanudo) ships. At any rate, all sources confirm that the Latin fleet was numerically inferior by about a third. Pursuant to their truce with the Byzantines, the Venetians of Negroponte themselves maintained an officially neutral stance, although some of their number did join the Latin fleet as individuals.

The Latin fleet caught the Byzantines by surprise, and their initial attack was so violent that they made good progress. Their ships, on which high wooden towers had been erected, had the advantage, and many Byzantine seamen and soldiers were killed or drowned. Just as victory seemed within the Latins' grasp, however, reinforcements arrived led by the despotes John Palaiologos. While retreating from Neopatras, the despotes had learned of the impending battle. Gathering whatever men he could, he rowed forty miles in one night and reached Demetrias just as the Byzantine fleet was beginning to waver.

His arrival boosted the Byzantines' morale, and Palaiologos's men, ferried on board the ships by small boats, began to replenish their casualties and turn the tide. The battle continued all day, but by nightfall, all but two Latin ships had been captured. The Latin casualties were heavy, and included the triarch of Negroponte Guglielmo II da Verona. Many other nobles were captured, including the Venetian Fillippo Sanudo, who was probably the fleet's overall commander.

== Aftermath ==
The victory at Demetrias went a long way to mitigating the disaster of Neopatras for the Byzantines. It also marked the beginning of a sustained offensive across the Aegean: by 1278, Licario had subdued all of Euboea except for its capital, Chalkis, and by 1280, as grand admiral (megas doux) of the Byzantine navy, he had retaken most of the Aegean islands for the Empire. His achievements were not to last long after his disappearance from history in c. 1280, however. In Euboea, Licario's major gain and personal fief, the Byzantine forts were gradually retaken by the Lombards, until they recovered the entire island by 1296.

== Notes ==
a: The date of the Battle of Neopatras, and hence also of the subsequent Battle of Demetrias, is disputed amongst scholars. Some historians (Deno J. Geanakoplos, Jean Longnon, Donald Nicol) followed the date 1275 proposed in the 19th century by Hopf interpreting the chronicle of Marino Sanudo, and placed the Thessalian campaign after the Council of Lyon. This dating is still adopted by a number of recent scholars like John Van Antwerp Fine. Others adopted the date 1271 proposed by the 17th-century Jesuit scholar Pierre Poussines interpreting the chronicle of G. Pachymeres, a datation reactualized by Raymond-Joseph Loenertz in the 1960s. A. Failler re-dated the events to 1272/1273, a date also adopted by other scholars like Alice-Mary Talbot in the Oxford Dictionary of Byzantium.

== Sources ==
- Failler, A. (1981). "Chronologie et composition dans l'Histoire de Georges Pachymérès". Revue des études byzantines. 39: 145–249. doi:10.3406/rebyz.1981.2121.
- Fine, John V. A. (1994) [1987]. The Late Medieval Balkans: A Critical Survey from the Late Twelfth Century to the Ottoman Conquest. Ann Arbor, Michigan: University of Michigan Press. ISBN 978-0-472-10079-8.
- Geanakoplos, Deno John (1959). Emperor Michael Palaeologus and the West, 1258–1282: A Study in Byzantine-Latin Relations. Cambridge, Massachusetts: Harvard University Press.
- Kazhdan, Alexander, ed. (1991). The Oxford Dictionary of Byzantium. Oxford and New York: Oxford University Press. ISBN 0-19-504652-8.
- Nicol, Donald M. (1993) [1972]. The Last Centuries of Byzantium, 1261–1453 (Second ed.). Cambridge: Cambridge University Press. ISBN 978-0-521-43991-6.
- Setton, Kenneth M. (1976). The Papacy and the Levant (1204–1571), Volume I: The Thirteenth and Fourteenth Centuries. Vol. 1. Philadelphia: The American Philosophical Society. ISBN 0-87169-114-0.
- Longnon, Jean (1969) [1962]. "The Frankish states in Greece, 1204-1311". In Setton, Kenneth M.; Wolff, Robert Lee; Hazard, Harry W. (eds.). A History of the Crusades, Volume II: The Later Crusades, 1189–1311. Vol. 2 (Second ed.). Madison, Milwaukee, and London: University of Wisconsin Press. ISBN 0-299-04844-6.
