= Princess of Achaea =

This is a list of the princess consorts of Achaea, the consorts of the Princes of Achaea.

The Principality of Achaea had three princesses by their own rights: Isabella, Matilda, and Joan. Their husbands were not consorts. Maria II Zaccaria was princess consort and later reigning princess.

== Princess consort of Achaea ==
=== House of Blois, 1205–1209 ===
Picture	Name	Father	Birth	Marriage	Became Princess	Ceased to be Princess	Death	Spouse
	Eustachia of Courtenay	Peter I of Courtenay (Courtenay)	1162	1200	1205 husband's accession	1209 husband's death	6 April, after 1235	William of Champlitte

=== House of Villehardouin, 1209–1278 ===
Picture	Name	Father	Birth	Marriage	Became Princess	Ceased to be Princess	Death	Spouse
	Elisabeth of Chappes	Clarembaud IV de Chappes			1210 husband's accession	1218	after 1218	Geoffrey I of Villehardouin
	Agnes of Courtenay	Peter II of Courtenay (Courtenay)	1202	1217, after April	1228 husband's accession	1246 husband's death	after 1247	Geoffrey II of Villehardouin
	Carintana dalle Carceri	Rizzardo dalle Carceri, Lord of Oreos (dalle Carceri)	before 1220	1246	1246 husband's accession	1255		William II of Villehardouin
	Anna Komnene Doukaina	Michael II Komnenos Doukas (Komnenodoukai)	-	1258		1 May 1278 husband's death	4 November 1286	William II of Villehardouin

=== Capetian House of Anjou, 1278–1289 ===
Picture	Name	Father	Birth	Marriage	Became Princess	Ceased to be Princess	Death	Spouse
	Margaret of Burgundy	Odo, Count of Nevers (Burgundy)	1250	18 November 1268		7 January 1285 husband's death	4 September 1308	Charles I of Naples
	Maria of Hungary	Stephen V of Hungary (Árpád)	1257	May/June 1270	7 January 1285 husband's ascession	1289; Achaea granted back to Isabella of Villehardouin	25 March 1323	Charles II of Naples

=== House of Villehardouin, 1289–1307 ===
- None

=== Capetian House of Anjou, 1307–1313 ===
Picture	Name	Father	Birth	Marriage	Became Princess	Ceased to be Princess	Death	Spouse
	Thamar Angelina Komnene	Nikephoros I Komnenos Doukas (Komnenodoukai)	-	13 August 1294	5 May 1306 husband's bestowment 11 May 1307; House of Villehardouin relinquish claims	1309 repudiated	1311	Philip I of Taranto

=== House of Avesnes, 1313-1321 ===
- None

After 1318 the title to Matilda's right to Achaea became disputed with Odo IV, Duke of Burgundy and Louis, Count of Clermont. She was stripped of her titles and hereditary rights after she wouldn't comply with her marriage to John of Gravina. Philip I of Taranto bestowed the title on John instead, bringing the title back into the Angevin inheritance, while Matilda verbally willed her right to her cousin James II of Majorca.

=== Capetian House of Anjou, 1321–1381 ===
Picture	Name	Father	Birth	Marriage	Became Princess	Ceased to be Princess	Death	Spouse
	Agnes de Périgord	Helie VII, Count of Périgord (Talleyrand)	-	14 November 1321		1332 relinquish title in exchange for rights to the Kingdom of Albania	after 11 August 1343	John of Gravina
	Marie de Bourbon	Louis I, Duke of Bourbon (Bourbon)	1315	9 September 1347		10 September 1364 husband's death	1387	Robert of Taranto
	Maria of Calabria	Charles, Duke of Calabria (Anjou-Naples)	May 1329	April 1355	10 September 1364 husband's accession	20 May 1366		Philip II of Taranto
	Elizabeth of Slavonia	Stephen, Duke of Slavonia (Anjou-Hungary)	1352	20 October 1370		1373 husband relinquish title to Joan I of Naples	before 1380	Philip II of Taranto

=== House of Baux, 1381–1383 ===
Picture	Name	Father	Birth	Marriage	Became Princess	Ceased to be Princess	Death	Spouse
	Agnes of Durazzo	Charles, Duke of Durazzo (Anjou-Durazzo)	1345	1382		7 July 1383 husband's death	15 July 1388	James of Baux

=== Capetian House of Anjou, 1383–1386 ===
Picture	Name	Father	Birth	Marriage	Became Princess	Ceased to be Princess	Death	Spouse
	Margaret of Durazzo	Charles, Duke of Durazzo (Anjou-Durazzo)	28 July 1347	24 January 1369/70	7 July 1383 husband's coronation	24 February 1386 husband's death	6 August 1412	Charles III of Naples

- Interregnum: At Charles III's death in 1386 the principality entered an interregnum where five pretenders claimed its throne, none having a strong enough claim to be considered a ruler until Peter of Saint Superan, leader of the Navarrese Company, declared himself Prince in 1396 with the blessing of Pope Urban VI, who claimed ownership of the principality since James of Baux's heirs had forfeited their rights to the Holy See.

=== House of Zaccaria, 1396-1429/54 ===
Picture	Name	Father	Birth	Marriage	Became Princess	Ceased to be Princess	Death	Spouse
	Maria II Zaccaria	Centurione I Zaccaria (Zaccaria)	-	-	1396 husband's accession	1402 husband's death and her own accession	1404	Pedro de San Superano

Picture	Name	Father	Birth	Marriage	Became Princess	Ceased to be Princess	Death	Spouse
	Asenina Palaiologina	Asan Palaiologos	-	-	1404 husband's accession	1429 Centurione ceases to be Prince	after 1432	Centurione II Zaccaria

Picture	Name	Father	Birth	Marriage	Became Princess	Ceased to be Princess	Death	Spouse
	Magdalene Tocco	Leonardo II Tocco	-	-	1453 husband's accession and was confirmed as Princess of Achaea by King Alfonso of Naples	1454 husband's exile, from then onwards she was a titular Princess	-	John Asen Zaccaria

Achaea was united with the Despotate of the Morea after the death of Centurione II Zaccaria.

== See also ==
- Princess of Taranto
- Duchess of Athens
- List of consorts of Naples
- List of consorts of Anjou
- List of consorts of Majorca
- List of Latin Empresses
