= George II Ghisi =

14th-century Latin feudal lord in Greece

George II Ghisi (Italian: Giorgio Ghisi; died c. 1344/5 or 1352) was a Latin feudal lord in medieval Greece, lord of Tinos and Mykonos and Triarch of Negroponte.

He was the son of Bartholomew II Ghisi. In 1326/27, as part of his father's rapprochement with the Catalans of the Duchy of Athens, George married Simona of Aragon, the daughter of the Catalan vicar-general Alfonso Fadrique. As Simona's dowry, the Ghisi received half the castellany of the Castle of Saint Omer in Thebes, which they held until its destruction in c. 1331/34. Bartholomew II died in 1341, and George succeeded him.

In 1343, at the request of Pope Clement VI, he armed a galley conjointly with John I Sanudo (duke of Naxos) and Balzana Gozzadini (regent of the two other thirds of Negroponte) to join the first Smyrniote crusade. According to Raymond-Joseph Loenertz, his disappearance from the sources after the events of 1344/45 could suggest that he may have participated in person and died in the fighting, as did the leaders Henry of Asti, Martino Zaccaria and the Venetian admiral Pietro Zeno. However, the date of 1352 was proposed (without justification) by Karl Hopf in the 19th century.

He was followed by his son, Bartholomew III Ghisi, who was still a minor, under the regency of his mother Simona until 1358.

| Preceded by Bartholomew II Ghisi | Triarch of Negroponte; 1341–1352 | Succeeded by Bartholomew III Ghisi |
| Preceded by Bartholomew II Ghisi | Lord of Tinos and Mykonos; 1341–1352 | Succeeded by Bartholomew III Ghisi |
