= William of Villehardouin =

Prince of Achaea from 1246 to 1278

William II
- Prince of Achaea and Grand Domestic of Romania (Note: Latin: magnus senescallus imperii Romanie, Ancient Greek: πρίγκιψ Ἀχαΐας καὶ μέγας δομέστικος Ῥωμανίας)
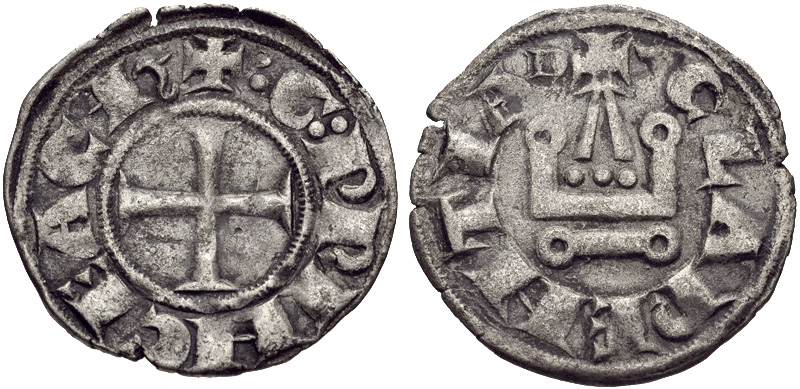
- Denier minted under William II

Prince of Achaea
- Reign: 1246–1278
- Predecessor: Geoffrey II
- Successor: Charles I
- Born: c. 1211; Kalamata, Achaea
- Died: 1 May 1278
- Spouse: N. of Toucy; Carintana dalle Carceri (disputed); Anna Komnene Doukaina
- Issue: Isabella; Margaret
- House: Villehardouin
- Father: Geoffrey I of Villehardouin
- Mother: Elisabeth
- Religion: Roman Catholicism

William of Villehardouin (French: Guillaume de Villehardouin; Kalamata, c. 1211 – 1 May 1278, Kalamatha) was the fourth prince of Achaea in Frankish Greece, from 1246 to 1278. The younger son of Prince Geoffrey I, he held the Barony of Kalamata in fief during the reign of his elder brother Geoffrey II. William ruled Achaea as regent for his brother during Geoffrey's military campaigns against the Greeks of Nicaea, who were the principal enemies of his overlord, the Latin Emperor of Constantinople, Baldwin II. William succeeded his childless brother in the summer of 1246. Conflicts between Nicaea and Epirus enabled him to complete the conquest of the Morea in about three years. He captured Monemvasia and built three new fortresses, forcing two previously autonomous tribes, the Tzakones and Melingoi, into submission. He participated in the unsuccessful Egyptian crusade of Louis IX of France, who rewarded him with the right to issue currency in the style of French royal coins.

In the early 1250s, William was the most powerful ruler of Frankish Greece. Most neighboring Frankish rulers acknowledged his suzerainty. In 1255, he laid claim to the northern terziere, or third, of the Lordship of Negroponte on the island of Euboea. Although the two other rulers of Negroponte were his vassals, they rejected his claim. They gained the support of Venice, Guy I de la Roche, Lord of Athens, and other Frankish rulers. The conflict developed into a war of succession that caused much destruction in Euboea and mainland Greece. After William's victory in Attica in May 1258, Guy and his allies surrendered. Guy was tried for his disloyalty but was allowed to keep his Achaean fiefs.

A succession crisis in Nicaea prompted the Epirote ruler Michael II Komnenos Doukas to form an anti-Nicaean coalition with William and Manfred of Sicily. In the summer of 1259, William and Michael assembled the bulk of their armies and marched as far as Pelagonia to fight the Nicaeans. The Frankish and Epirote troops could not cooperate effectively, and archers from the enemy camp harassed them continuously. After the Epirotes abandoned their allies unexpectedly, the Nicaeans inflicted a decisive defeat on the Franks. William fled from the battlefield, but he was captured and sent to Nicaea. He was still in prison when Nicaean troops seized Constantinople and destroyed the Latin Empire in July 1261. The triumphant Byzantine emperor Michael VIII Palaiologos released William in return for three southern Morean fortresses in late 1261. The possession of the three forts facilitated further Byzantine expansion, and William was forced to seek external support. With the approval of Baldwin II, he swore fealty to the Angevin king of Sicily, Charles I. William acknowledged Charles and his descendants as his heirs in the Treaty of Viterbo on 24 May 1267. Charles sent troops to Achaea and with their help, William was able to resist Byzantine invasions during the last years of his reign.

== Background ==
Frankish Greece around 1210. The Principality of Achaea includes almost the whole Morea in the south.

Ruling from 1246 to 1278, William was the fourth prince of Achaea. A state in Frankish Greece, Achaea was established in Byzantine territories in the Morea (in southern Greece) in the aftermath of the Fourth Crusade. William's father Geoffrey I of Villehardouin began the conquest of the Morea with a local Greek aristocrat's support in late 1204. As his ally soon died, Geoffrey approached Boniface of Montferrat, the ruler of the newly established Frankish Kingdom of Thessalonica, for military aid. Boniface appointed William of Champlitte to accompany Geoffrey back to the Morea and they mustered 500 knights and serjants for the campaign. They captured Patras and other Byzantine fortresses and forced the Messenian and Arcadian Greek aristocrats into submission. William of Champlitte received the title of Prince of Achaea from Pope Innocent III in November 1205. The Franks could not capture Monemvasia in southeastern Morea, and Greek corsairs seized the fortress. The Frankish conquerors were also unable to overcome the natives in the southeastern mountainous region.

In the newly established principality, Geoffrey held the Barony of Kalamata in Messenia in fief. When William died in 1208, Geoffrey assumed power likely with his peers' consent. He swore fealty to the Latin Emperor of Constantinople, Henry, at the Parliament of Ravennika in 1209. Henry confirmed Geoffrey as the new Prince of Achaea and made him an immediate imperial vassal. The leaders of the Fourth Crusade had promised much of the Morea to Venice in their 1204 treaty about the distribution of the Byzantine Empire. In a new treaty Geoffrey recognized he held parts of his principality in fief from Venice, but the Venetians took no further steps to assert their theoretical suzerainty.

As the Franks could not conquer all the Byzantine territories, two successor states, Epirus and Nicaea, emerged on the western and eastern borderlands of the Byzantine Empire respectively. The Greeks of Epirus started the reconquest of the former Byzantine territories in Thessaly in the 1210s. They annihilated the Kingdom of Thessalonica and captured the city of Thessalonica in December 1224. Their expansion towards Constantinople came to an abrupt end when they suffered a massive defeat by the Bulgarians in the Battle of Klokotnitsa in 1230. The Greeks of Nicaea launched invasions against the Latin Empire from the east. By 1235, they reconquered Anatolia and seized a European bridgehead at Gallipoli. In theory, the princes of Achaea still owed allegiance to the Latin Emperors, but in practice Emperor Baldwin II would have been unable to defend Constantinople without Achaean military and financial support. In return, he acknowledged Geoffrey's elder son and successor, Geoffrey II, as the overlord of the triarchs (three co-rulers) of the island of Negroponte (and possibly of other Aegean islands).

== Early life ==
William was the second son of Geoffrey I of Villehardouin and his wife Elisabeth. Elisabeth remained in France when her husband left for the Fourth Crusade. She and their elder son, Geoffrey, only moved to Achaea when Geoffrey's position stabilized after the Parliament of Ravennika. She gave birth to William in the castle of Kalamata around 1211. Growing up in the Morea, William could speak Greek like a native and he felt home with both Franks and Greeks. As a younger son, William received the Barony of Kalamata in fief, while his brother succeeded their father as prince around 1229. William married an unnamed daughter of Narjot de Toucy, a high-ranking official of the Latin Empire. He administered Achaea as regent during his brother's military campaigns for the defense of Constantinople.

== Reign ==
=== Expansion and crusade ===
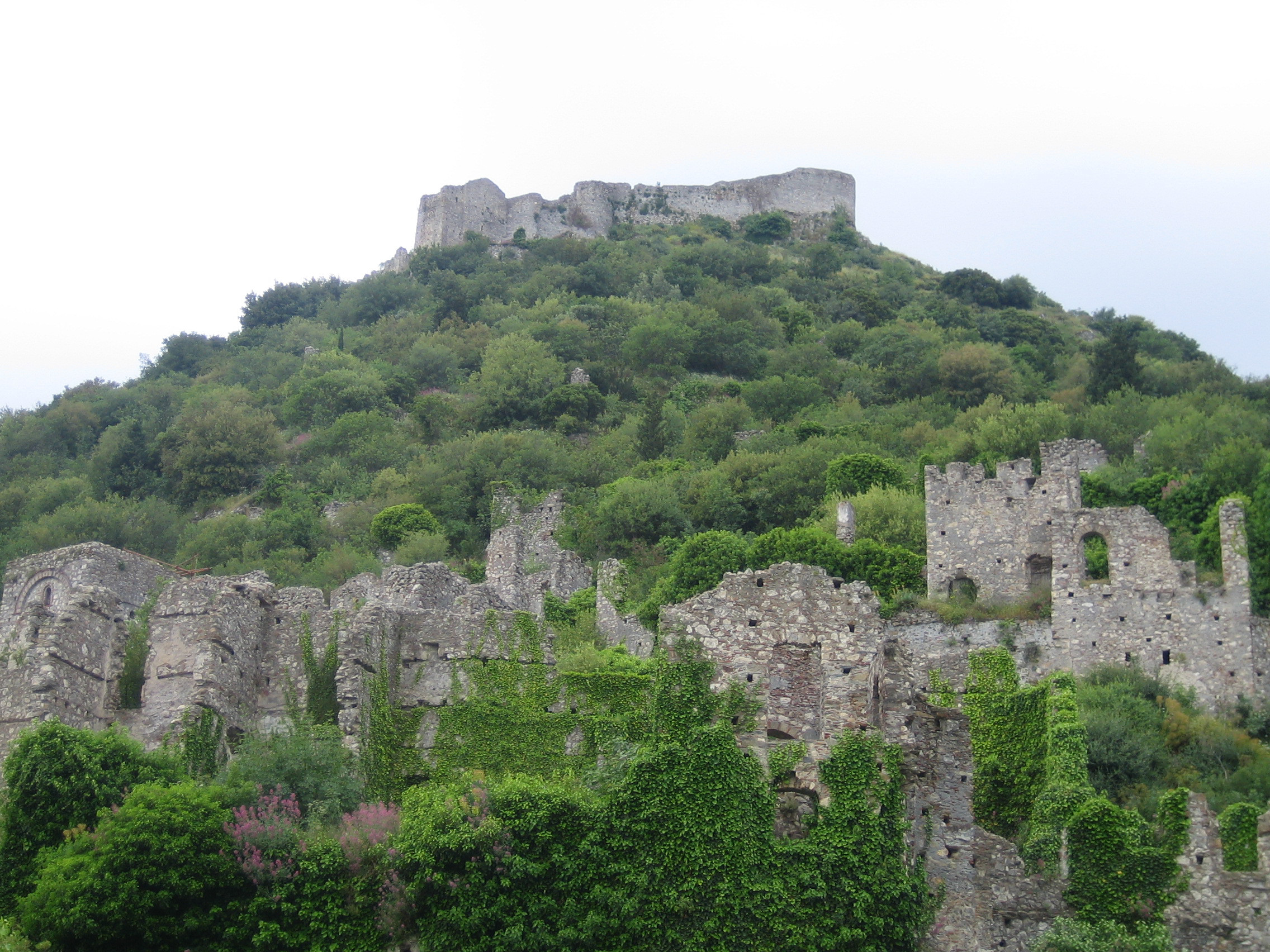
Ruins of the fortress of Mistra. William built it to complete the conquest of southeastern Morea in 1249, but he had to cede it to the Byzantines in 1261.

William came to power in Achaea when the childless Geoffrey II died in the summer of 1246. By the time of William's ascension, the relationship between Epirus and Nicaea had grown tense. In December 1246, Nicaean troops attacked and captured Thessalonica. William took advantage of the two Greek powers' conflict to complete the conquest of the southeastern Morea. He laid siege to Monemvasia with the support of a Venetian fleet and other Frankish rulers, including Guy I de la Roche, Lord of Athens (who owed allegiance to William for the Moreot fiefs of Argos and Nauplia), and Angelo Sanudo, Duke of the Archipelago. The defenders suffered because of famine, but they capitulated only in 1248, after William promised to respect their property and liberty. (Note: Most historians accept that Monemvasia was conquered by William in 1248. Alternatively, the historian Haris Kalligas writes that the defenders only surrendered in 1252 or 1253, while Guillaume Saint-Guillain says that William's brother, Geoffrey, had already seized Monemvasia in the late 1220s.) He rewarded the town's leaders with estates and exempted them from feudal obligations. William's conquest of Monemvasia forced the Tzakones of nearby Mount Parnon into submission. To secure his gains, William ordered the construction of new fortresses. First, in late 1248 and early 1249, he personally directed the construction of Mistra near the Mount Taygetus; then the castle of Grand Magne was built on the Laconian Gulf. A third castle, Beaufort, was constructed on the Messenian Gulf. These castles secured the Frankish control of the Mount Taygetus, forcing the local Slavic tribe of the Melingoi to acknowledge William as their ruler in return for the confirmation of their liberty.

Hugh IV, Duke of Burgundy spent the winter of 1248–49 in Achaea. He was on the way to Cyprus where the participants of Louis IX of France's crusade against Egypt were assembling. William decided to join the crusade and mustered 400 knights and armed a fleet of 24 ships before he left for Cyprus together with Hugh in May 1249. On the way, he sent 100 knights to Rhodes, an island that the Genoese had recently conquered from the Nicaeans, to strengthen its defence. From Cyprus, William accompanied Louis to Egypt and remained with him until the end of the abortive military campaign. As a reward, Louis granted him the right to mint coins in the style of the French denier tournois. William returned to Achaea in May 1250. During the following five peaceful years, Achaea was the dominant power of Frankish Greece as most of the lesser Frankish rulers acknowledged William as their overlord.

=== War of the Euboeote Succession ===
Carintana dalle Carceri was one ruler of Negroponte, sharing Oreus and the island's northern triarchy, or third, with Grapella of Verona. When she died in 1255, William wanted to seize her lordship, but Grapella laid claim to her inheritance. As the triarchs owed allegiance to both Achaea and Venice, Grapella could cite a 1216 ruling by the Venetian bailo, or governor, of Negroponte, that stated a co-ruler of a triarchy was entitled to re-unite it if his or her partner died without issue. The lords of the island's two other triarchies, Guglielmo I da Verona and Narzotto dalle Carceri, supported Grapella's claim. The Venetian chronicler Marino Sanudo writes that the conflict developed into a war after William had Guglielmo and Narzotto imprisoned, because their wives convinced the Venetian bailo Paolo Gradenigo to intervene and he seized the island's capital, Chalcis. If the two triarchs were indeed incarcerated, they were held in captivity only for some months. William appointed his nephew Geoffrey of Briel to lead an army to Negroponte. The Achaean troops laid waste to the island and expelled the Venetians.

The Doge of Venice, Reniero Zeno, made Marco Gradenigo the new bailo. Gradenigo gained the support of William's vassal, William de la Roche and his brother, Guy I of Athens. Guglielmo of Verona and Narzotto dalle Carceri met Gradenigo at Guy's seat in Thebes on 14 June 1256. At the meeting, the two triarchs rejected Achaean overlordship and swore fealty to Venice for their lordships. Two other Frankish lords, Thomas II d'Autremencourt, Lord of Salona and Ubertino Pallavicini, Marquess of Bodonitsa, joined the anti-Achaean coalition, while William secured the support of Othon de Cicon, Lord of Karystos in Negroponte and the Genoese. Gradenigo attacked Chalcis, and the Venetian infantrymen routed the Achaean cavalry near the city.

The war quickly spread to mainland Greece. When William made preparations for an invasion of Attica, Geoffrey of Briel, who was the son-in-law of Guy of Athens, deserted him. Before long, Chalcis surrendered to the Venetians. William assembled his army and invaded Athens across the Isthmus of Corinth in the spring of 1258. Guy I of Athens and his allies tried to stop the invasion at Mount Karydi, but William inflicted a decisive defeat on them in May 1258. Guy and his allies fled to Thebes, and William pillaged Attica and Boeotia. William attacked Thebes, but the city's archbishop persuaded him to abandon the siege. Guy pledged he would never fight against William and agreed to accept the decision of the High Court of Achaea for his disloyalty. After hearing Guy at Nikli, the Achaean aristocrats sitting at the High Court decided they could not judge the case because Guy owed fealty to William only for his Moreot domains, not for the Lordship of Athens. Instead of forfeiting Guy's Moreot fiefs, the High Court referred his case for judgement to King Louis IX. As Guy accepted this ruling, peace was restored between the two Frankish rulers. Louis IX received Guy in Paris in June 1259. The King and the French barons decided Guy had done adequate penance for breaking his oath of fealty by undertaking the arduous journey to France.

=== Defeat and captivity ===
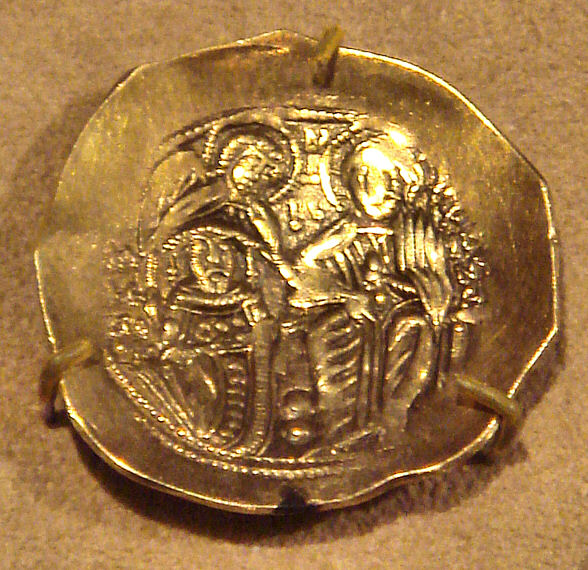
Gold hyperpyron of Michael VIII Palaiologos

Doge Ranieri Zeno ordered the new bailo of Negroponte, Andrea Barozzi, to conduct peace negotiations with William early in 1259, but he became embroiled in a new conflict between Epirus and Nicaea before the negotiations began. The Nicaean emperor, Theodore II Laskaris, was succeeded by an underage son, John IV Lascaris, in August 1258. An ambitious Nicaean aristocrat overthrew the child emperor's guardians and had himself crowned co-emperor as Michael VIII Palaiologos. The ruler of Epirus, Michael II Komnenos Doukas, wanted to take advantage of the Nicaean power struggles by fostering a wide anti-Nicaean coalition. He offered the hands of his daughters Helena and Anna to the Hohenstaufen ruler of Sicily, Manfred, and William respectively. He promised a generous dowry to William—80,000 hyperpyra, the castle of Liconia and nearby lands in southern Thessaly. Since their possession could strengthen his hold on Oreus, William quickly accepted the offer. He married Anna in Patras late in the summer of 1258. Before the end of the year, he and his father-in-law met in Patras and concluded a formal alliance. According to The Chronicle of the Morea, Michael acknowledged William's claim to a revived Kingdom of Thessalonica.

Michael VIII dispatched his brother, John Palaiologos, with fresh troops to Thessalonica. He sent envoys to Epirus, Sicily and Achaea to start peace negotiations, but Michael II, Manfred and William refused. Enforced by newly hired mercenary troops, John Palaiologos launched a full-scale invasion of Epirus. Unable to resist alone, Michael II called for his allies' assistance in the spring of 1259. William assembled the bulk of the Achaean army. The Aragonese version of The Chronicle of the Morea, in this respect a source of dubious reliability, estimates that "eight thousand first-class men-at-arms and twelve thousand men on foot" gathered for the campaign. William led the Achaean army across the Gulf of Corinth and joined his father-in-law at Arta. They marched to southern Thessaly, where reinforcements from Athens, Salona, Negroponte, Naxos and other Aegean islands joined them. After the Frankish and Epirote commanders decided to fight a pitched battle instead of attacking fortified towns, the allies marched to Macedonia as far as the plain of Pelagonia to meet the enemy force in June 1259. Although the combined number of the Epirote–Frankish soldiery outnumbered the Nicaean troops, their command remained divided.

John Palaiologos avoided battle, but his Cuman and Turkish archers continuously harassed the enemy camp. As their constant attacks exhausted the Franks and Epirotes, Michael II entered into negotiations with John Palaiologos's envoys, who urged him to desert his Frankish allies. The Byzantine historian, George Pachymeres, asserts that the Epirote–Frankish coalition split after Achaean knights disrespected the beautiful Vlach wife of Michael II's bastard son, John Doukas, because William refused to discipline them. Outraged by William's rude remarks about his illegitimate birth, John Doukas deserted to the Nicaeans and convinced his father to abandon the campaign. John's unexpected attack from the rear caused panic and the Franks' retreat quickly turned into a flight. Historian Kenneth Setton considers this whole episode, not reported by the more contemporary Akropolites, doubtful. Akropolites credits the allies' defeat to Michael II's inability to resist the archers' attack. After his flight from the battlefield, the Epirotes either followed his suit or deserted to the Nicaean. As the Nicaean victory seemed inevitable, William fled towards Kastoria. Akropolites writes that William hid under a haystack, but a soldier recognized him by his large protruding teeth. He was shackled and sent to Nicaea together with Anseau of Toucy, Geoffrey of Briel and other Achaean aristocrats. Michael VIII demanded the entire Achaean principality for William's release. William refused, stating that Achaea was "a land acquired by force of arms, held by right of conquest" by the conquerors' descendants, and that he could not surrender his vassals' territory. During his prolonged but comfortable captivity, Guy I of Athens assumed the regency for him in Achaea.

The Nicaeans failed to conquer Thessaly and Epirus after their victory at Pelagonia, but their hold of Thessalonica was secured. As the Latin Empire was in ruins and exhausted, Michael VIII decided to re-conquer Constantinople from the Latins. He concluded an alliance with Genoa to secure naval support for the siege, but his general, Alexios Strategopoulos, seized Constantinople without Genoese assistance, taking advantage of the absence of the Latin garrison on 25 July 1261. Michael VIII was again crowned emperor in the Hagia Sophia and quickly deposed his underage co-emperor, John IV. After the fall of the Latin Empire, new negotiations began between Michael VIII and William about the conditions of William's release. They reached a compromise when William agreed to cede Mistra, Grand Magne and Monemvasia. As they had been built or conquered by William, their transfer did not violate Achaean customary law, but he could not cede frontier castles "without the counsel and consent of his liegemen". To legalize the transfer of the three castles, William's wife convoked the imprisoned Achaean lords' wives to a parliament. Although Guy I opposed the proposal, the "parliament of dames" consented to it because the Achaean ladies wanted their husbands back. Before releasing William, Michael VIII extracted an oath of fealty from him and took two Achaean ladies, Margaret of Passavant and an unnamed sister of John Chauderon, as hostages to secure William's compliance with their agreement. William returned to Achaea late in 1261. After the Byzantines had taken possession of the three castles, the Tzakones and the Melingoi transferred their loyalty to Michael VIII.

=== Conflicts with the Byzantines ===
Neither William nor Michael VIII believed the peace treaty would be lasting: the Byzantines could use their Moreot bridgeheads for further expansion, while William could hardly acquiesce to the territorial losses. As a consequence of the Byzantine expansion in the Morea, William could rarely offer fiefs to western European knights, which diminished his principality's military power. Yet the Byzantines refrained from launching major invasions against Achaea because the Frankish cavalry were still able to inflict severe defeats on them. Instead, they attacked poorly garrisoned fortresses and seized them with the support of the local Greeks and Slavs. Pope Urban IV released William from the oath he had taken at Constantinople under duress, and William started peace negotiations with the Venetians. In May 1262, William abandoned his claim to rule parts of Negroponte directly in return for the recognition of his suzerainty over the island. The Venetians were to destroy their seaside fort at Chalcis, but their quarter in the city was expanded.

The possession of the port of Monemvasia allowed the Byzantines to transfer troops to the Morea. By the end of 1262, they seized Cape Maleas and took control of the nearby Mani Peninsula. Pope Urban IV urged the Catholic bishops and abbots of Frankish Greece to support the Achaeans against the "schismatic" Byzantines on 27 April 1263, but he soon realized he could achieve his principal goal, the unity of Christendom, only through negotiating with Michael VIII. Michael VIII sent a new army to Monemvasia in the summer of 1263. The Byzantines invaded Arcadia and seized small fortresses, but the Franks routed them near William's capital at Andravida. Another Byzantine army marched towards Kalavryta and seized it with the support of the local population. Next year, the Byzantine commander John Kantakouzenos launched a new invasion of Arcadia, but he perished in a skirmish near Andravida. As he had failed to pay off his Turkish mercenaries, they entered into William's service. With their support, William defeated the Greeks at Nikli and laid siege to Mistra, but he could not capture it.

In response to the Byzantine offensive in the Morea, Urban IV proclaimed a crusade against Michael VIII, but he also appointed new delegates to start negotiations with him about the church union. Manfred of Sicily was willing to support the Franks against the Byzantines by force, but Pope Urban, who regarded Manfred as the principal enemy of the Papacy, rejected the offer. Instead of promoting an anti-Byzantine coalition, the papal delegates mediated a reconciliation between Michael VIII and William before the Pope died in October 1264.

=== Angevin suzerainty ===
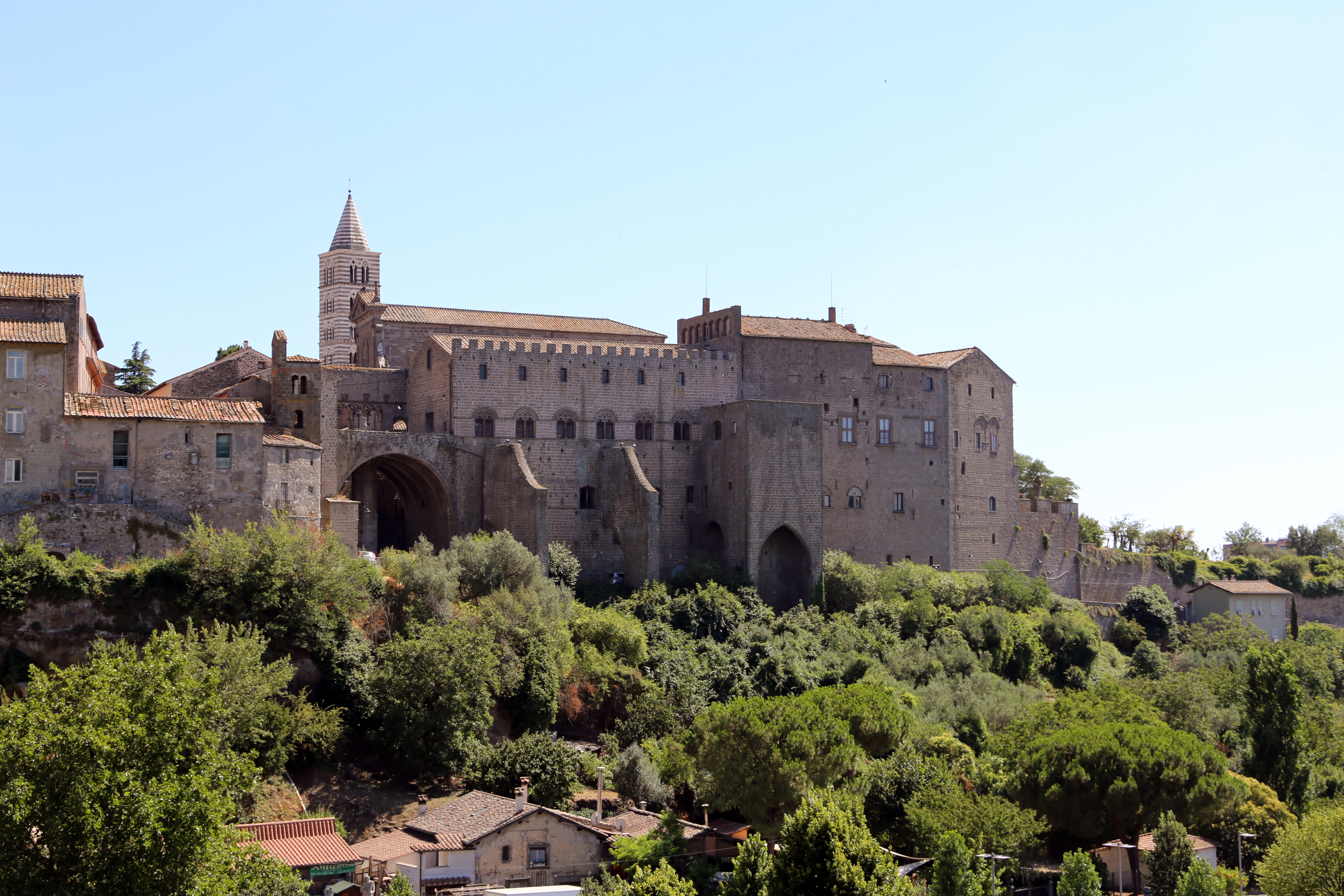
The popes' palace in Viterbo. The 1267 Treaty of Viterbo established Charles I of Anjou's suzerainty over Achaea and his claim to succeed William in the principality.

Urban's successor, Pope Clement IV, granted the Kingdom of Sicily to King Louis IX's ambitious younger brother, Charles I of Anjou in 1265. Charles invaded southern Italy, and Manfred died fighting against the invaders in the Battle of Benevento on 26 February 1266. Charles took full control of Manfred's kingdom and revived his plans for an anti-Byzantine coalition. As negotiations on the church union had not yielded results, Pope Clement embraced Charles' idea. He summoned Charles, the titular Latin Emperor Baldwin II and William to Viterbo in Italy to discuss the conditions of an invasion of the Byzantine Empire by Charles. Charles and William reached an agreement after lengthy discussions. William swore fealty to Charles and promised not to "make enfeoffment which will remain in effect after" his death "beyond 14,000 hyperpyra of land". He consented to the marriage of his daughter, Isabella, with Charles's younger son, Philip. Although his wife was pregnant, William acknowledged Charles and Charles's descendants as his heirs even if Isabella and Philip had no children and Anna gave birth to a son, only stipulating their son's right to hold one-fifth of Achaea in fief of the Angevins. As historian Peter Lock emphasizes, William's concessions show "the straits to which the principality had been reduced by the Greek offensive". In return, Charles promised military support to recover the territory lost to the Byzantines, but the details of his assistance remained unclarified. Baldwin II confirmed the treaty and ceremoniously ratified in the presence of the Pope, 14 cardinals and further ecclesiastic and secular dignitaries in the papal chamber in Viterbo on 24 May 1267. In a separate treaty, Baldwin II ceded all his suzerain rights over Achaea to Charles and his successors in return for Charles' promise to assist him to recover Constantinople within six or seven years.

As Charles's loyal vassal, William led 400 knights to fight against Charles's opponent, the young Hohenstaufen prince Conradin in the Battle of Tagliacozzo on 23 August 1268. On his return to Achaea in January 1269, William captured Valona to establish a secure bridgehead for Charles's troops on the eastern shore of the Adriatic Sea. The Achaean barons formally recognized the Treaty of Viterbo in the presence of Charles's envoys in 1270. Next year, Charles appointed the Marshal of Sicily, Dreux of Beaumont, to represent him as captain general in Achaea.

At the same time, the adventurer Licario had seized a sturdy fortress near Karystos in Euboea. He made an alliance with the Byzantines, and with their support, he undertook to conquer the entire island. William and Dreux launched a joint military campaign against Licario and recaptured the fortress La Cuppa at Avlonari from him. The Byzantines launched two major invasions against Achaea between 1270 and 1275, but William was able to repel them with the support of Angevin troops. Walter of Rosières, who held the Barony of Akova in Achaea, died childless and his heir, Margaret of Passova was still held as hostage for William in Constantinople. William claimed the barony escheated to the crown because she failed to claim it personally within the customary period of a year and a day. After her return from Constantinople, Margaret revived her claim to Akova and took the influential aristocrat John of Saint Omer as her husband to secure his support. Saint Omer convinced William to compensate Margaret, and he restored one-third of the barony to her in 1276.

As William's son-in-law Philip died childless early in 1277, it was evident that Charles or Charles's offspring would inherit Achaea from William on his death. He died on 1 May 1278. With his death, the male line of the Villehardouin family became extinct. Charles succeeded him without opposition, but he allegedly never visited Achaea. Galeran of Ivry represented Charles in the principality as bailli and vicar-general.

== Legacy ==
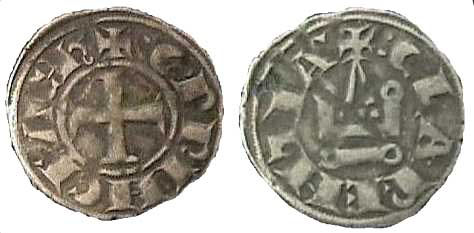
Coin of William struck at Glarentza (inscription +:G:PRINCEACh, +:CLARENTIA)

Historian Kenneth M. Setton describes William as "the most lordly of the princes of Achaea", emphasizing the strength and prestige of Achaea reached its zenith during William's rule around 1250. The author Nicolas Cheetham writes William was ambitious "and headstrong by nature", but his "political projects, conceived on a grand scale, were apt to fail because he over-estimated his strength and took too many risks". William is the key protagonist of The Chronicle of Morea. Marino Sanudo the Elder emphasizes the prosperity of William's principality, mentioning merchants could travel in Achaea safely, without using cash. He says that William's court "appeared greater than a great king's court". William was noted as a trouvère (composer). Two of his compositions have been preserved in the Manuscrit du Roi, a richly illuminated 13th-century collection of ballads and poems.

Achaea could never regain its power after the Nicaean victory at Pelagonia. Although the Byzantine governors of the Morea conquered the baronies of Passavant and Kalavryta during the last years of his reign, William kept most lands he had inherited from his brother. After the Treaty of Viterbo, Achaea "passed for the duration of its checkered history into the orbit of Neapolitan politics, warfare, and intrigue". With opening the princely print at Glarentza, William put an end to his principality's dependence on Byzantine coins. The Achaean coins were struck on the patterns of William's coins during the reign of his successor.

== Family ==
William's first wife, the unnamed daughter of Narjot of Toucy, was King Louis IX's second cousin through her grandmother, Agnes of France. Cheetham writes she died before William inherited Achaea from his brother. Historian Karl Hopf conjectured that Carintana dalle Carceri was William's second wife. As Setton writes, she "comes to life in the pages of Frankish history only on the day she died, for her death caused the war of the Euboeote succession". Setton, among other scholars, endorses Raymond-Joseph Loenertz's refutation of Hopf's conjecture. He writes that Hopf misinterpreted Marino Sanudo's report of her death and its consequences. However, other authors, including Cheetham and Peter Lock, mention her as William's wife.

William's next wife, Anna Komnene Doukaina, took the name of Agnes on their marriage. Their elder daughter, Isabella, could not return to Achaea from Naples after the death of her first husband Philip of Anjou. In 1289, Charles I's son and successor, Charles II, restored her right to rule Achaea and married her off to his distant cousin Florent of Hainaut. After Florent died in 1297, she ruled Achaea alone until her third marriage with Philip of Savoy in 1301. The Achaean barons disliked Philip, and Charles II released them from their allegiance to the couple in 1306. Isabella died in exile in 1311. William's younger daughter by Anna–Agnes, Margaret, received two-thirds of the Barony of Akova from his father in 1276. She married Isnard of Sabran first. Her second marriage was to Richard I Orsini, Count palatine of Cephalonia and Zakynthos, in 1299. In 1311, she claimed William had bequeathed Achaea to her in a secret will on his deathbed. Her claim gave rise to civil war between the supporters of her niece Matilda of Hainaut and her son-in-law Ferdinand of Majorca after she died in 1315.

== Notes ==
Regnal titles
Preceded by Geoffrey II	Prince of Achaea; 1246–1278	Succeeded by Charles I
