= Peter dalle Carceri =

Peter dalle Carceri (Italian: Pietro dalle Carceri, died 1340) was a Triarch of Euboea and Baron of Arcadia. He was descended from the noble Dalle Carceri family, son of Grapozzo dalle Carceri and Beatrice of Verona, both Lords of Euboea.

According to a conjecture by Karl Hopf, he married first with a daughter from the first marriage of George I Ghisi, Lord of Tinos and Mykonos; however this hypothesis is rejected by Loenertz.

In 1324, Peter is attested as lord of half of the Barony of Arcadia in the Principality of Achaea, and it is usually assumed that this came about as a result of a second marriage to Balzana Gozzadini, the widow of Baron Erard II of Aulnay. Balzana died soon after.

He died in 1340 and he was succeeded by his son Giovanni, who was the only son of the second marriage.

== Sources ==
- Miller, William (1908). The Latins in the Levant: A History of Frankish Greece (1204–1566). London: John Murray. OCLC 563022439.
- Bon, Antoine (1969). La Morée franque. Recherches historiques, topographiques et archéologiques sur la principauté d'Achaïe [The Frankish Morea. Historical, Topographic and Archaeological Studies on the Principality of Achaea] (in French). Paris: De Boccard. OCLC 869621129.
