= Alexios Doukas Philanthropenos =

Byzantine nobleman and admiral

Alexios Doukas Philanthropenos (Greek: Ἀλέξιος Δούκας Φιλανθρωπηνός, died c. 1275) was a Byzantine nobleman and distinguished admiral, with the rank of protostrator and later megas doux, during the reign of Michael VIII Palaiologos (r. 1259–1282).

== Biography ==
Alexios is the first important member of the Philanthropenos family mentioned in the sources. He first appears in George Akropolites's history in autumn 1255 as a military commander in the region of Ohrid — perhaps as doux (governor) of the local thema (province) — during the wars of Theodore II Laskaris (r. 1254–1258) against the Bulgarians.

Throughout the 1260s, Philanthropenos carried the high title of protostrator. Theoretically, he was subordinate to the megas doux Michael Laskaris, but the latter was old and infirm, and Philanthropenos exercised the de facto command of the Byzantine navy. In 1262 or 1263, soon after the recapture of Constantinople from the Latin Empire, Emperor Michael VIII Palaiologos sent him to raid the Latin possessions of the Aegean Sea. This was the first major expedition undertaken by Palaiologos' recently expanded and reorganized navy, and Philanthropenos' ships were manned by the new corps of the Gasmouloi and the Prosalentai. The Byzantines raided and sacked the islands of Paros, Naxos, and Keos, as well as the towns of Karystos and Oreoi on Negroponte (Euboea), before sailing south to support the operations of an expeditionary force that landed at Monemvasia against the Principality of Achaea.

In 1270, Philanthropenos was possibly the general who commanded the army that landed at Monemvasia, and for the next years operated in the Morea against the Achaeans. Both sides in this conflict avoided a potentially disastrous direct confrontation, instead focusing on raids in order to plunder and devastate their opponent's territory. During the early 1270s, Philanthropenos led his fleet several times against the Latins, supporting Licario, an imperial vassal, in Negroponte, and participating in the great Byzantine naval victory at the Battle of Demetrias, during which he was heavily wounded. For this success, he was raised to the rank of megas doux, now vacant after Michael Laskaris's death.

Philanthropenos died around 1275, and was succeeded as megas doux soon after by Licario.

=== Family ===
Alexios had one daughter, Maria, who married the protovestiarios Michael Tarchaneiotes. Their second son was the pinkernes Alexios Philanthropenos the Younger, a prominent general who scored several successes against the Anatolian Turks, and who led an unsuccessful rebellion against Andronikos II Palaiologos (r. 1282–1328) in 1295.

Preceded by John Angelos	Protostrator ca. 1262 – ca. 1273/4	Succeeded by Andronikos Palaiologos
Preceded by Michael Laskaris	Megas doux ca. 1273 – ca. 1275	Succeeded by Licario
