= Licario =

13th-century Byzantine admiral

- Megas konostaulos and megas doux of the Byzantine Empire

Ruler of Euboea
- Rule: c. 1278 – 1280
- Born: mid 13th century Karystos, Triarchy of Negroponte
- Died: late 13th century
- Spouse: Felisa da Verona
- Occupation: Military commander

Licario, called Ikarios (Greek: Ἰκάριος) by the Greek chroniclers, was a Byzantine admiral of Italian origin in the 13th century. At odds with the Latin barons (the "triarchs") of his native Euboea, he entered the service of the Byzantine emperor Michael VIII Palaiologos (r. 1259–1282), and reconquered many of the Aegean islands for him in the 1270s. For his exploits, he was rewarded with Euboea as a fief and rose to the rank of megas konostaulos and megas doux, the first foreigner to do so.

== Biography ==
=== Origins and early life ===
Licario was born in Karystos in Latin-held Euboea (Negroponte), from a Vicentian father and a local woman. He was of humble origin, but able and ambitious. Serving as a knight under the Latin triarch Giberto II da Verona, he managed to win the heart of Felisa, sister of Giberto and widow of another triarch, Narzotto dalle Carceri. The match was met with disapproval by Felisa's family. They secretly married, but the marriage was cancelled by her relatives. Fleeing from their wrath, Licario sought refuge in the fort of Anemopylae near Cavo D'Oro. He repaired the strong fortress, assembled a small group of followers, and began raiding the surrounding estates, belonging to the island's nobles.

=== Entry into Byzantine service ===
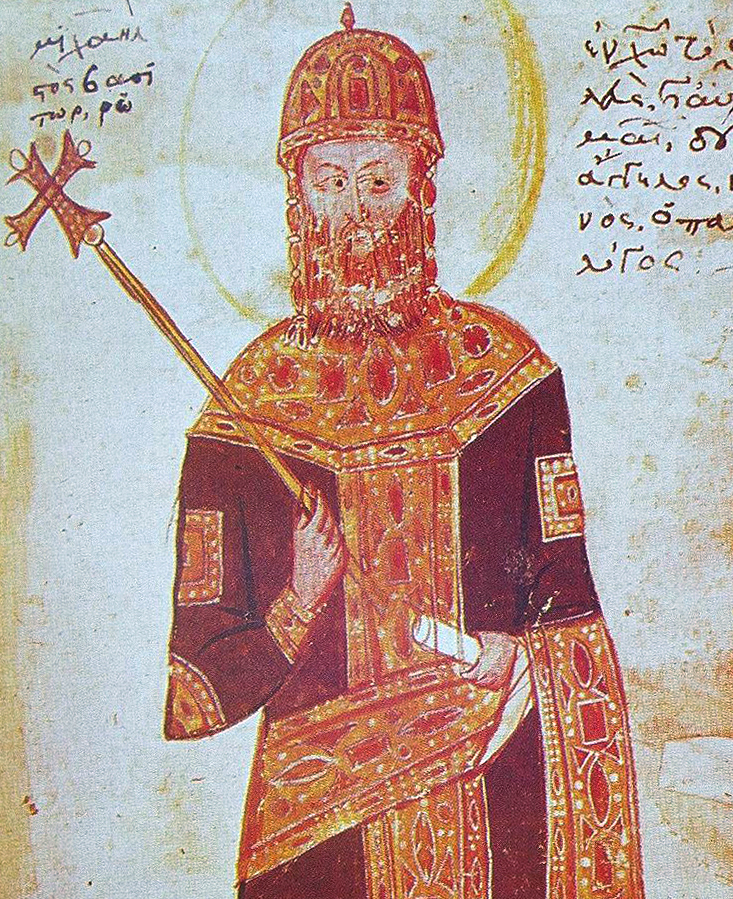
Emperor Michael VIII Palaiologos, in whose service Licario conquered most of Euboea and many Aegean islands

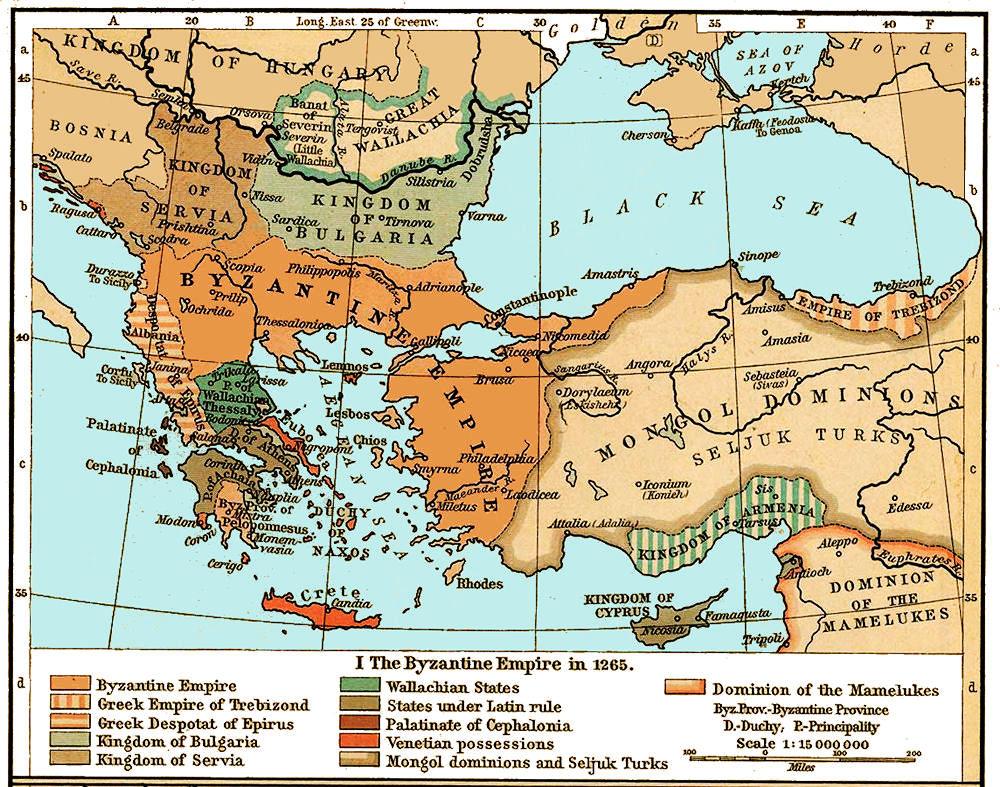
Map of the Byzantine Empire and the Latin East in c. 1265

At that time, the newly restored Byzantine Empire, under the leadership of Michael VIII Palaiologos, sought to recover Euboea, which was the major Latin insular possession in the Aegean Sea, and the main naval base, not only of the Venetian fleet, but also of Latin piratical activity directed against his lands. Furthermore, along with the Principality of Achaea it presented the major obstacle to his complete recovery of Greece. Already in 1269/70, in retaliation for raids against the coasts of Asia Minor, a Byzantine fleet under Alexios Doukas Philanthropenos had attacked and captured many Latin nobles near the town of Oreos.

Facing the persistent refusal of the island's barons to treat with him, desiring vengeance and eager for glory and wealth, Licario presented himself to Philanthropenos, offering his services. He, in turn, took him to the Emperor, who was eager to use the services of talented Westerners whenever he could, and had already bankrolled several Latin corsairs in his service. Licario became the Emperor's vassal according to Western feudal rules, and in turn was strengthened with imperial troops. Under the leadership of Licario, the Byzantines could now mount a serious attempt to conquer the island, while their forces were further augmented by many defections from the Greek population.

In 1272/73, the Byzantine forces, now under Licario's command, launched a campaign that took the fortresses of Larmena, La Cuppa, Clisura and Manducho. The Lombard triarchs then appealed to their liege-lord, Prince William II of Achaea, and to Dreux de Beaumont, marshal of the Angevin Kingdom of Sicily. William was able to recover La Cuppa, but de Beaumont was defeated in a pitched battle and was subsequently recalled by Charles of Anjou. Between then and 1275, according to the Venetian chronicler Marino Sanudo, Licario himself served in the Byzantine army in Asia Minor, where he scored a victory against the Turks.

=== Conquest of Euboea and campaigns in the Aegean ===
In 1276, following their great victory over the Lombard triarchs of Negroponte at the Battle of Demetrias, the Byzantines renewed their offensive in Euboea. Licario attacked his native Karystos, seat of the southern triarchy, and took it, after a long siege, in the same year. For this success, he was rewarded by Michael VIII with the whole island as a fief, and a noble Greek wife with a rich dowry. In turn, Licario pledged to provide 200 knights to the Emperor. Gradually, Licario reduced the Latin strongholds on the island, until, by 1278, he had seized almost all of it except for the capital, the city of Negroponte (Chalkis).

For his successes, Licario was rewarded with the post of megas konostaulos, head of the Latin mercenaries, and eventually appointed as megas doux after Philanthropenos's death in c. 1276; the first foreigner to be thus honoured. He commanded the Byzantine navy in a series of expeditions against the Latin-held Aegean islands. The first to fall was Skopelos, whose fortress was believed to be impregnable. Licario, however, knew that it lacked water supplies. Thus, he attacked it during the hot and dry summer of 1277 and forced its surrender. Its lord, Filippo Ghisi, was captured and sent to Constantinople; his other possessions, the islands of Skyros, Skiathos and Amorgos, were also taken soon after. After that, Licario went on to capture the islands of Kythera and Antikythera off the southern coast of the Morea, and later Kea, Astypalaia, and Santorini in the Cyclades. The great island of Lemnos was also captured, although its lord, Paolo Navigajoso, withstood a three-year siege before surrendering.

Finally, in late 1279 or early 1280, he returned to Euboea, landing in the northern town of Oreos and moving south towards Negroponte. His forces by now included many Spanish and Catalan mercenaries (the first time the latter are mentioned in Greece) and even former adherents of Manfred of Sicily, who had fled to Greece after Manfred's defeat and death at the hands of Charles of Anjou. As he reached Negroponte, the triarch Giberto II da Verona, Felisa's brother, and John I de la Roche, the Duke of Athens, who were present at the city, rode out with their forces to meet him. The two armies met at the village of Vatondas, northeast of Negroponte. The battle resulted in a major victory for Licario: John de la Roche was unhorsed and captured, while Giberto was either killed (according to Sanudo) or captured and taken along with de la Roche as a prisoner to Constantinople, where, according to Nikephoros Gregoras, the sight of the hated renegade, moving triumphantly among the assembled Byzantine court, caused him to drop dead.

After Vatondas, Negroponte seemed about to fall into Licario's hands too. The city, however, was quickly reinforced by Jacques de la Roche, lord of Argos and Nauplia, who, along with the energetic Venetian bailo of Negroponte, Niccolo Morosini Rosso, led its defence. Facing determined resistance and possibly fearing an intervention of John I Doukas, ruler of Thessaly, Licario was forced to raise the siege. Licario then turned to reducing the remaining Latin strongholds on the island, becoming its total master except for the city of Negroponte itself, and ruling it from the fortress of Fillia. His fleet carried out further naval expeditions: the islands of Sifnos and Serifos were taken, and Licario's ships raided the Morea.

Licario himself sailed to Constantinople, presenting Emperor Michael VIII with his captives. Then, at the height of his fame and success in c. 1280, Licario disappears from the sources, and his subsequent fate is unknown. Most likely he lived in Constantinople and died there.

== Assessment ==
His conquests proved temporary only, as the Byzantines were gradually evicted by the Venetians and the other Latin lords. Even in Euboea, Licario's major gain and personal fief, the triarchs managed to complete their reconquest of the entire island by 1296. Nevertheless, Licario proved one of the most successful military leaders in Michael VIII's employ, and his victories greatly enhanced the emperor's own standing and prestige amongst the Latins. The historian Deno John Geanakoplos ranks him, along with Michael's brother John Palaiologos, as the two men who caused the most damage to the Latin rulers of Greece.

== Sources ==
- Bartusis, Mark C. (1997). The Late Byzantine Army: Arms and Society, 1204–1453. Philadelphia, Pennsylvania: University of Pennsylvania Press. ISBN 0-8122-1620-2.
- Fine, John V. A., Jr. (1994) [1987]. The Late Medieval Balkans: A Critical Survey from the Late Twelfth Century to the Ottoman Conquest. Ann Arbor, Michigan: University of Michigan Press. ISBN 978-0-472-10079-8.
- Geanakoplos, Deno John (1959). Emperor Michael Palaeologus and the West, 1258–1282: A Study in Byzantine-Latin Relations. Cambridge, Massachusetts: Harvard University Press.
- Nicol, Donald M. (1993) [1972]. The Last Centuries of Byzantium, 1261–1453 (Second ed.). Cambridge: Cambridge University Press. ISBN 978-0-521-43991-6.
- Setton, Kenneth M. (1976). The Papacy and the Levant (1204–1571), Volume I: The Thirteenth and Fourteenth Centuries. Vol. 1. Philadelphia: The American Philosophical Society. ISBN 0-87169-114-0.
