= Anna Komnene Doukaina =

Princess consort and regent of Achaea

Princess consort of Achaea
- Tenure: 1258–1278

Regent of the Principality of Achaea
- Tenure: 1259–1263

Baroness of Kalamata (suo jure)
- Tenure: 1278–1282
- Died: 4 January 1286
- Burial: Church of St. Jacob, Andravida
- Spouse: William II of Villehardouin (1st); Nicholas II of Saint Omer (2nd)
- Issue: Isabella of Villehardouin; Margaret of Villehardouin
- House: Komnenodoukai
- Father: Michael II Komnenos Doukas
- Mother: Theodora of Arta

Anna Komnene Doukaina (died 4 January 1286), known in French as Agnes, was princess-consort of the Principality of Achaea in 1258–1278 and regent between 1259–1262, during the captivity of her husband, Prince William II of Villehardouin, by the Byzantine emperor Michael VIII Palaiologos. After William II's death in 1278, she re-married to the powerful baron Nicholas II of Saint Omer.

== Life ==
Anna was a daughter of the ruler of Epirus, Michael II Komnenos Doukas (r. 1230–1268), and his wife, Theodora.

=== Marriage to William II of Villehardouin ===
In 1258, she was married to the Prince of Achaea, William II of Villehardouin, at Patras, while her sister Helena was married to Manfred of Hohenstaufen, King of Sicily. These marriages were part of a web of alliances directed against the Empire of Nicaea, whose expansion threatened both the interests of the Epirote ruler, who claimed the Byzantine imperial heritage for himself, and the very existence of the Latin states of Greece. The diplomatic and military manoeuvring that followed led to the eventual defeat of the Epirote–Latin alliance in the Battle of Pelagonia in 1259.

Prince William and most of his barons were captured at the battle, and until their return, Anna governed the Principality of Achaea in her husband's name, with the assistance of the Duke of Athens, Guy I de la Roche. The Nicaean emperor, Michael VIII Palaiologos, offered to set free William and his nobles and provide for comfortable retainers for them, if they were to hand over the Principality to him; and while William refused this offer, after the reconquest of Constantinople by Palaiologos he finally agreed to hand over a number of fortresses and swear an oath of allegiance to Palaiologos in exchange for his freedom. This was ratified by the so-called "Parliament of Ladies" (as most of the male nobles of Achaea were prisoners) at Nikli, presided over by Anna. In early 1262 Villehardouin was released, and the forts of Monemvasia and Mystras, as well as the district of Mani, were handed over to the Byzantines.

=== Death of William II and second marriage ===
Anna was William's third wife. William was childless with his first two wives, but Anna bore him two daughters, Isabella and Margaret. After William II's death in 1278, per the Treaty of Viterbo, the princely title passed to the King of Sicily, Charles of Anjou. Anna inherited the Villehardouins' patrimonial domain, the Barony of Kalamata, and the fortress of Chlemoutsi, which she had received as a dowry from William. She also became guardian of her youngest daughter Margaret, while Isabella had been married to Charles' son Philip and had gone to Italy, where she remained even after her husband died in 1277.

In 1280, Anna married a second time, to the rich lord of one half of Thebes, Nicholas II of Saint Omer. This worried King Charles, who was uneasy to see Chlemoutsi, the strongest castle in Achaea, and Kalamata, which comprised some of the Principality's most fertile lands, in the hands of an already powerful vassal. Thus, after negotiations, in 1282 Anna exchanged her possessions with lands elsewhere in Messenia. Anna's marriage with Nicholas remained childless, and she died on 4 January 1286, being buried alongside her first husband in the church of St. Jacob in Andravida.

== Sources ==
- Bon, Antoine (1969). La Morée franque. Recherches historiques, topographiques et archéologiques sur la principauté d'Achaïe [The Frankish Morea. Historical, Topographic and Archaeological Studies on the Principality of Achaea] (in French). Paris: De Boccard. OCLC 869621129.
- Geanakoplos, Deno John (1959). Emperor Michael Palaeologus and the West, 1258–1282: A Study in Byzantine-Latin Relations. Cambridge, Massachusetts: Harvard University Press. OCLC 1011763434.
- Macrides, Ruth (2007). George Akropolites: The History – Introduction, Translation and Commentary. Oxford: Oxford University Press. ISBN 978-0-19-921067-1.
- Trapp, Erich; Walther, Rainer; Beyer, Hans-Veit (1976). Prosopographisches Lexikon der Palaiologenzeit (in German). Vol. 1. Vienna: Verlag der Österreichischen Akademie der Wissenschaften. ISBN 3-7001-3003-1.

Preceded by Carintana dalle Carceri	Princess consort of Achaea; 1258–1278	Succeeded by Margaret of Burgundy as Queen consort of Sicily
Preceded by William II of Villehardouin	Baroness of Kalamata and Lady of Chlemoutsi; 1278–1282	Merger with the Angevin princely domains
