= Marino Sanuto =

Marino Sanuto or Marino Sanudo may refer to:

- Marino Sanuto the Elder (c. 1270–1343), Venetian statesman and geographer
- Marino Sanuto the Younger (1466–1536), Venetian historian and diarist
