= Bartholomew II Ghisi =

Latin feudal lord

Bartholomew II Ghisi (Italian: Bartolommeo Ghisi; died 1341) was a Latin feudal lord in medieval Greece, lord of Tinos and Mykonos, Triarch of Negroponte and Grand Constable of the Principality of Achaea.

== Biography ==
Bartholomew was the son of George I Ghisi and Alice dalle Carceri. His father died at the Battle of the Cephissus against the Catalan Company in 1311. As Bartholomew was underage, his mother assumed the regency while he was still minor, until her own death two years later. By 11 June 1315, Bartholomew II Ghisi was in direct control of his domains. From his father, Bartholomew inherited the lordship of Tinos, Mykonos, and parts of Kea and Serifos in the Duchy of Naxos, and from his mother one of the triarchies of Euboea (according to Raymond-Joseph Loenertz the central triarchy of Chalkis), while his father's other possession by his first wife, the Barony of Chalandritsa in the Principality of Achaea, returned to a member of the Dramelay family, Nicholas of Dramelay. At some unspecified date, Batholomew married a daughter of the Grand Constable of Achaea, Engilbert of Liederkerque, and had a son, George II Ghisi.

From 1317 to 1327 Bartholomew and his fellow triarchs, backed by the Venetians, confronted the Catalans of the Duchy of Athens for the domination in Euboea. In spring 1317, Andrea Corner, ruler of one sixth of Euboea, allowed 2,000 Catalans entry into the city of Chalkis. The Catalans were expelled from the city following the intervention of Venice, but the situation on the island remained complicated following the death of Boniface of Verona, lord of Karystos. His daughter, Marulla of Verona, disputed Boniface's inheritance with her half-brother Thomas. Marulla was married with the Catalan leader Alfonso Fadrique, whose men occupied the disputed castles. Venetian mediation led to the signing of a truce of all involved parties on 19 June 1319; Bartholomew signed it along with the Venetian bailo of Negroponte, Francesco Dandolo, John de Noyer de Maisey, triarch of the southern third of Euboea, Pietro dalle Carceri and Andrea Corner, lords of the two northern sixths of the island, and Alfonso Fadrique for the Catalans.

Bartholomew later came to hold the post of Grand Constable of the Principality of Achaea as well, probably through his marriage, although he does not appear to have had lands in the principality. He held this post in 1320, when the Byzantine governor of Mystras, Andronikos Asen, invaded the territory of Achaea. As a vassal of the Prince of Achaea, Bartholomew Ghisi participated in the army sent against the Byzantines, but in a battle on 9 September at the castle of Saint George, he was taken prisoner, along with several high-ranking nobles of the Principality, and was sent to Constantinople. He remained captive for some years and was released in 1325, although on 11 May 1321 he appears among the signatories of a new truce with the Catalans in Chalkis.

In 1326/27, he reached a rapprochement with the Catalans, sealed by the marriage of his son George II to Simona of Aragon, daughter of the Catalan vicar-general Alfonso Fadrique. Bartholomew received—probably as Simona's dowry—half the castellany of the Castle of Saint Omer in Thebes, which he held until its destruction in c. 1331/34. This pro-Catalan attitude led to remonstrances by Venetian officials. At the same time (1326/27) he had a conflict for unknown reasons with the Duke of Naxos Nicholas I Sanudo and was therefore condemned by the Venetian bailo of Negroponte, who confiscated some of his goods while his wife was imprisoned (by the bailo or Sanudo). The affair was judged several times at Venice but its outcome remains unknown; however Bartholomew must have regained his standing with Venice since he was included in its truce with the Catalans in 1331.

In 1328, Bartholomew and his brother Marino sold their share of Kea (half the island) to Ruggiero Premarin. In 1331/32, Bartholomew reverted to an hostile attitude toward the Catalans (perhaps partly because of the dismissal of Alfonso Fadrique from the post of vicar-general) and backed Walter VI of Brienne in his abortive attempt to enforce his ancestral claims on the Duchy of Athens. It was precisely in order to avoid the Castle of Saint Omer falling in Brienne's hands that the Catalans destroyed it. According to the prologue of the French version of the Chronicle of the Morea, it derives from a prototype that Bartholomew held at the Castle of Saint Omer. It is therefore likely that Bartholomew owned the original version of the Chronicle, whose versions in various languages are the major primary source about the history of Frankish Greece.

Bartholomew II Ghisi died in 1341.

== Sources ==
- Bon, Antoine (1969). La Morée franque. Recherches historiques, topographiques et archéologiques sur la principauté d'Achaïe [The Frankish Morea. Historical, Topographic and Archaeological Studies on the Principality of Achaea] (in French). Paris: De Boccard. OCLC 869621129.
- Loenertz, Raymond-Joseph (1975). Les Ghisi, dynastes vénitiens dans l'Archipel (1207-1390) (in French). Florence: Olschki.
- Ravegnano, Giorgio (2000). "GHISI, Bartolomeo". Dizionario Biografico degli Italiani (in Italian). Vol. 54: Ghiselli–Gimma. Rome: Istituto dell'Enciclopedia Italiana. ISBN 978-88-12-00032-6.
- Setton, Kenneth M. (1976). The Papacy and the Levant (1204–1571), Volume I: The Thirteenth and Fourteenth Centuries. Vol. 1. Philadelphia: The American Philosophical Society. ISBN 0-87169-114-0.
- Topping, Peter (1975). "The Morea, 1311–1364". In Setton, Kenneth M.; Hazard, Harry W. (eds.). A History of the Crusades, Volume III: The Fourteenth and Fifteenth Centuries. Vol. 3. Madison and London: University of Wisconsin Press. pp. 104–140. ISBN 0-299-06670-3.

Preceded by George I Ghisi	Lord of Tinos and Mykonos; 1311–1341	Succeeded by George II Ghisi
Preceded by Alice dalle Carceri	Triarch of Negroponte; 1313–1341	Succeeded by George II Ghisi
