= Carintana dalle Carceri =

- Born: unknown
- Died: 1255

Carintana dalle Carceri (died in 1255) was the triarch (terziere) of the northern third (Oreus) of the Lordship of Negroponte in Frankish Greece in c. 1220–1255.

== Death ==
Nothing is known about her life. She was the daughter of Rizzardo dalle Carceri, whom she had succeeded in that capacity. Her childless death in 1255 provoked the War of the Euboeote Succession involving Venice and most rulers of Frankish Greece. This followed the complaint of one of Carintana's kinsmen, Leone dalle Carceri (last attested 1259), to William of Villehardouin, Prince of Achaea, about being preempted from taking Carintana's inheritance by two other triarchs of Euboea, Narzotto dalle Carceri and his father-in-law Guglielmo da Verona. Leone's appeal resulted in Prince William ordering the imprisonment of Narzotto and Guglielmo and invading Negroponte, where he seized the northern triarchy of Oreus and the part of the city of Negroponte that pertained to the triarchs (as opposed to the Venetians). The Venetian bailly retaliated, and a major regional conflict ensued. When peace was formally concluded in 1262, the triarchs Guglielmo da Verona, Narzotto dalle Carceri, and Grapella dalle Carceri (Leone's son and Carintana's ultimate successor) officially recognized the suzerainty of the Prince of Achaia and undertook to honor their obligations to him and to Venice, "as they had been in the time of the Lady Carintana."

The common understanding of the issue is that Carintana was the second wife of William of Villehardouin, Prince of Achaea, and that his invasion of Negroponte was precipitated by his simultaneous desire to claim her inheritance (Oreus) and to assert his rights as the feudal overlord of the island. However, the now widespread belief that William of Villehardouin was Carintana's widower, going back to the influential work of Karl Hopf, as followed by J. B. Bury, relies upon a mere hypothesis, which does not constitute a fact. According to a study of the available documentation by R. J. Loenertz, Carintana, perhaps a widow, died childless (the name of her husband being unknown), and William of Villehardouin's intervention in Negroponte was not based on any familial (spousal) claims to inherit her, but on his rights as the feudal overlord of the island and as natural adjudicator of the inheritance dispute. The feudal suzerainty over Negroponte had been transferred to the Prince of Achaia by the Latin Emperor Baldwin II sometime in 1240/1244.

== Sources ==
- Bury, J. B., “The Lombards and Venetians in Euboia (1205–1303),” The Journal of Hellenic Studies 7 (1886) 309-352.
- Cheetham, N., Medieval Greece, New Haven, 1981.
- Hopf, C., Chroniques gréco-romanes inédites ou peu connues avec notes et tables généalogiques, Berlin, 1873.
- Loenertz, R. J., “Les seigneurs tierciers de Négrepont de 1205 à 1280,” Byzantion 35 (1965) 235-276.
- Longnon, Jean (1969) [1962]. "The Frankish States in Greece, 1204–1311". In Wolff, Robert Lee; Hazard, Harry W. (eds.). A History of the Crusades. Vol. II: The Later Crusades, ' 1189–1311. The University of Wisconsin Press. pp. 235–276. ISBN 0-299-04844-6.
- Lock, Peter (1995). The Franks in the Aegean: 1204-1500. Longman. ISBN 0-582-05139-8.
