= Ravano dalle Carceri =

Italian nobleman (died 1216)

Ravano dalle Carceri (died 1216) was an Italian nobleman from Lombardy. He was one of the first triarchs of Negroponte from 1205.

In 1205, Ravano was among those who led forces in the capture of the island of Euboea from the Byzantine Empire as part of the Fourth Crusade. The island was made subject to the Kingdom of Thessalonica and in August King Boniface divided the island into thirds, granting probably the central third to Ravano. The rulers of Euboea (Negroponte to the Italians) were called terzieri or triarchs: rulers of thirds.

In 1209, after fellow triarchs Peccoraro de' Peccorari and Giberto da Verona (a relative of Ravano), had returned to Italy and died, respectively, Ravano seized control of the whole island and rebelled against his nominal suzerain, now Demetrius. The Republic of Venice recognised his independence as Lord of Negroponte and he accepted Venetian suzerainty in March. However the rebels were defeated in May and Ravano recognized the suzerainty of Emperor Henry. Later in the year he foiled the conspiracy of Oberto II of Biandrate, his former ally, who had planned to take the life of the Emperor Henry. He was successful in maintaining his rule until his death.

Ravano had agreed to marry Isabella, the wife of another man, sometime prior to 25 May 1212, when, after she was widowed, the Archbishop of Athens received dispensation from Pope Innocent III to perform the marriage.

Ravano made no provision for his principality in light of his death and it was left to the Venetian bailiff to divide Euboea into sixths in 1217. The northern third, with capital at Oreoi, was divided between Ravano's nephews, Merino I and Rizzardo; the central third, with the island's capital, Chalkis, was divided between his widow, Isabella, and his daughter, Bertha; and the southern third, with capital at Karystos, was divided between Giberto's heirs, Guglielmo I and Alberto.

Ravano's wife may have been the trobairitz Ysabella.

== Sources ==
- Bury, John B. "The Lombards and Venetians in Euboia (1205–1303)." Journal of Hellenic Studies, 7 (1886), pp. 309–352.
- Charanis, Peter. "The Monastic Properties and the State in the Byzantine Empire." Dumbarton Oaks Papers, 4 (1948), pp. 51–118.
- Fotheringham, J. K. "Genoa and the Fourth Crusade." English Historical Review, 25:97 (Jan., 1910), pp. 26–57.
- Loenertz, R-J (1978), Les seigneurs tierciers de Négrepont, Byzantion, vol. 35 (1965), re-edited in Byzantina et Franco-Graeca : series altera (1978), Rome, Edizioni di storia e letteratura
- Longnon, Jean (1969) [1962]. "The Frankish States in Greece, 1204–1311". In Setton, Kenneth M.; Wolff, Robert Lee; Hazard, Harry W. (eds.). A History of the Crusades, Volume II: The Later Crusades, 1189–1311. Vol. 2 (Second ed.). Madison, Milwaukee, and London: University of Wisconsin Press. pp. 234–275. ISBN 0-299-04844-6.
- Wolff, Robert Lee (1969) [1962]. "The Latin Empire of Constantinople, 1204–1261". In Setton, Kenneth M.; Wolff, Robert Lee; Hazard, Harry W. (eds.). A History of the Crusades, Volume II: The Later Crusades, 1189–1311. Vol. 2 (Second ed.). Madison, Milwaukee, and London: University of Wisconsin Press. pp. 186–233. ISBN 0-299-04844-6.
