= Narzotto dalle Carceri =

Narzotto dalle Carceri was the ruler of the southern terziere, or third, of the Lordship of Negroponte in Frankish Greece from 1247 to 1264. He married Felisa, a daughter of William I of Verona.. His mother may have been from the line of the family of Narjot de Toucy, as Narzotto could be a Italianised diminutive of this name. The Toucy, notably, had the use to transmit the name Narjot to male line.

== Sources ==
- Longnon, Jean (1969) [1962]. "The Frankish States in Greece, 1204–1311". In Wolff, Robert Lee; Hazard, Harry W. (eds.). A History of the Crusades. Vol. II: The Later Crusades, ' 1189–1311. The University of Wisconsin Press. pp. 235–276. ISBN 0-299-04844-6.
- Setton, Kenneth M. (1991) [1976]. The Papacy and the Levant, 1204-1571: The thirteenth and fourteenth centuries. Memoirs of the American Philosophical Society. Vol. 114. American Philosophical Society. ISBN 978-0-87169-114-9.
