= William I of Verona =

William I of Verona (Italian: Guglielmo I da Verona, died in 1263) was the ruler of the central terziere, or third, of the Lordship of Negroponte in Frankish Greece from 1216 to 1263. He was also the titular of king of Thessalonica from 1243 to 1246.

== Sources ==
- Longnon, Jean (1969) [1962]. "The Frankish States in Greece, 1204–1311". In Wolff, Robert Lee; Hazard, Harry W. (eds.). A History of the Crusades. Vol. II: The Later Crusades, ' 1189–1311. The University of Wisconsin Press. pp. 235–276. ISBN 0-299-04844-6.
- Lock, Peter (1995). The Franks in the Aegean: 1204-1500. Longman. ISBN 0-582-05139-8.
