= Karl Hopf (historian) =

- Born: Carl Hermann Friedrich Johann Hopf; February 19, 1832; Hamm, Westphalia
- Died: August 23, 1873 (aged 41); Wiesbaden
- Occupation: Historian
- Known for: Expert in Medieval Greece, both Byzantine and Frankish

Karl Hopf (February 19, 1832, in Hamm, Westphalia – August 23, 1873, in Wiesbaden) or Carl Hermann Friedrich Johann Hopf was a historian and an expert in Medieval Greece, both Byzantine and Frankish.

== Career ==
Hopf graduated from the University of Bonn, where he received his Ph.D. in the medieval history of Greece. He worked as a professor and librarian in the University of Greifswald and the University of Königsberg. He frequently visited Italian and Greek medieval archives to find sources for his works.

== Notable works ==
His notable works include the "History of Greece from the beginning of Middle Ages to the year 1821". It was considered the most important addition made to the knowledge about Byzantine and modern Greek history in the period 1863-1877, when considerable additions had been made.

In his 1870 work, Hopf dealt with the migrations of the Romani people. According to him, after they came from the East, they were first concentrated in the Romanian lands. To escape slavery, they went to Serbia, and the Serbian Emperor Stefan Dušan dispersed them throughout the Balkans, as far as Greece.

== Sources ==
- Peter Wirth: Hopf, Carl. In: Neue Deutsche Biographie (NDB). Band 9. Duncker & Humblot, Berlin 1972, S. 609.
- Ludwig Streit: Hopf, Karl. In: Allgemeine Deutsche Biographie (ADB). Band 13. Duncker & Humblot, Leipzig 1881, S. 102–104.

== Works ==
- List of works published by Karl Hopf, listed in catalogue of National library in Berlin
