= Raymond-Joseph Loenertz =

Luxembourgish historian (1900–1976)

Raymond-Joseph Loenertz (10 June 1900 – 31 August 1976) was a medievalist from Luxembourg. He entered the Dominican Order and since 1930 worked in the Dominican Historical Institute.

His work focused on the history of the Dominican Order and the relations between the Byzantine Empire and the Latin West. He published the letters of the Byzantine theologian Manuel Kalekas (Vatican City 1950) and of the theologian and statesman Demetrios Kydones (2 vv., Vatican City 1956-1960) and, with Antonio Garzya, works by Procopius of Gaza.

== Works (selection) ==
- An index for the years 1932–70 can be found in Byzantina et Franco–Graeca. Articles parus de 1935 à 1966. Réédités avec la collaboration de Peter Schreiner. Edizioni di Storia e Letteratura, Rome 1970, pp. XIX–XXIX
- La Société des Frères Pérégrinants. Istituto storico domenicano S. Sabina, Rome 1937.
- Les Recueils de lettres de Démétrius Cydonès. Biblioteca Apostolica Vaticana, Vatican 1947.
- The Apocalypse of Saint John. Authorized translation by Hilary J. Carpenter. Sheed & Ward, London 1948.
- Le Panégyrique de S. Denys l’Aréopagite par S. Michel le Syncelle. in: Analecta Bollandiana 68, 1950, pp. 94–107.
- Athènes et Néopatras: regestes et notices pour servir à l'histoire des duchés catalans (1311-1394), Istituto Storico Domenicano, Rome 1955.
- Demetrius Cydones, Correspondance. Biblioteca Apostolica Vaticana, Vatican 1956.
- with Antonio Garzya (Ed.): Procopii Gazaei Epistolae et Declamationes. Buch-Kunstverlag, Ettal 1963 (Studia Patristica et Byzantina, 9).
- with Johannes Maria Hoeck: Nikolaos-Nektarios von Otranto, Abt von Casole. Beiträge zur Geschichte der ost-westlichen Beziehungen unter Innozenz III. und Friedrich II. Buch-Kunstverlag, Ettal 1965 (Studia patristica et Byzantina, 11). A monograph of Nicholas of Otranto.
- with Peter Schreiner: Les Ghisi. Dynastes vénitiens dans l’Archipel, 1207–1390. L. S. Olschki, Florence 1975.

=== Articles reprints ===
- Byzantina et Franco–Graeca. Articles parus de 1935 à 1966. Réédités avec la collaboration de Peter Schreiner. Edizioni di Storia e Letteratura, Rome 1970.
- Byzantina et Franco–Graeca. Series altera. Articles choisis parus de 1936 a 1969. Republiés avec la collaboration de Pierre Marie De Contenson, Enrica Follieri et Peter Schreiner. Edizioni di storia e letteratura, Rome 1978.
