= Sanudo =

Venetian noble family

- Origin: Venetian
- Founded: 1043 (first recorded Sanudo); 421 (per-legend)
- Founder: Marco Sanudo (first recorded Sanudo); Tommaso Candiano Sanudo (per-legend)
- Current head: Extinct
- Titles: Duke of the Archipelago; Lord of Gridia; Lord of Milos
- Connected members: Candiano
- Dissolution: 19th Century
- Cadet branches: Sanudo di San Matteo di Rialto; Sanudo di San Silvestro; Sanudo di San Giacomo dell'Orio; Sanudo di San Polo; Sanudo di San Severo

The Sanudo (sometimes spelled Sanuto) were a Venetian noble family. The earliest known member was Marco Sanudo (1043–1096), but the family is sometimes said to descend from the older Candiano. The family went extinct in the 19th century. A branch ruled the Duchy of the Archipelago from 1204 until 1566. Other branches include:

- Sanudo di San Matteo di Rialto
- Sanudo di San Silvestro
- Sanudo di San Giacomo dell'Orio, whose most famous members were Francesco Sanudo and Marino Sanudo the Younger
- Sanudo di San Polo, whose most famous member was Benedetto Sanudo
- Sanudo di San Severo, whose most famous members were Marino Sanudo Torsello and Livio Sanuto

Family legend had it that the Sanudo were among the families who elected the first doge, Paolo Lucio Anafesto, in 697. Their founder was supposedly a certain Tommaso Candiano Sanudo, a Roman senator from Padua who, fleeing the raids of Attila the Hun, found refuge in the lagoon in 421. The family then settled in Eraclea, later moving to Malamocco and governing the populations present there as tribunes.

== Notable members ==
- Angelo Sanudo (died 1262), the second Duke of the Archipelago from 1227
- Cristina Sanudo, Dogaressa of Venice by marriage to the Doge Cristoforo Moro (1462–1471)
- Fiorenza I Sanudo, Lady of Milos (died 1397), lady of the island of Milos in Frankish Greece
- Florence Sanudo (died 1371), daughter and successor as the seventh Duchess of John I, Duke of the Archipelago, in 1362, reigning with her second husband until her death
- Guglielmazzo Sanudo, Lord of Gridia (fl. between 1349 and 1362), was a Lord of Gridia
- John I Sanudo (died 1362), the sixth Duke of the Archipelago from 1341 to his death
- Marco I Sanudo (1153–1220), the creator and first Duke of the Duchy of the Archipelago, after the Fourth Crusade
- Marco II Sanudo (died 1303), the third Duke of the Archipelago from 1262 to his death
- Marco Sanudo, Lord of Gridia, Lord of Gridia, a fief in Andros
- Marco Sanudo, Lord of Milos, Lord of the island of Milos in Frankish Greece
- Maria Sanudo, Lady of Andros (died 1426), Lady of Andros
- Marino Sanudo Torsello (1260–1338), Venetian statesman and geographer
- Marino Sanudo the Younger (1466–1536), Venetian historian and diarist
- Nicholas I Sanudo (died 1341), the fifth Duke of the Archipelago from 1323 to his death
- Nicholas II Sanudo (died 1374), called Spezzabanda, Lord of Gridia (a fief in Andros) and eighth Consort Duke of the Archipelago
- William I Sanudo (died 1323), the fourth Duke of the Archipelago from 1303 to his death

== See also ==
- Palazzo Sanudo, San Polo
- Ca' Sanudo Turloni, Venice
