= Marco Sanudo =

Marco Sanudo or Marco Sanuto may refer to:

- Marco I Sanudo (1153–1220), creator and first duke of the Duchy of the Archipelago
- Marco II Sanudo (died 1303), third duke of the Archipelago from 1262 to his death
- Marco Sanudo, Lord of Gridia (14th century)
- Marco Sanudo, Lord of Milos (died after 1376)
