= War of the Donkey =

13th-century war fought over the ownership of a donkey

The War of the Donkey (Italian: guerra dell'asino) was a conflict in 1286 between the rival noble families of the Ghisi and the Sanudo in the Duchy of the Archipelago in the Aegean Sea, over the ownership of a donkey.

In the late 13th century, the Aegean Sea was a haven for piracy. In 1286, a group of pirates raided Tinos, a possession of the Ghisi family, and carried off a donkey. Although marked with the initials of its owner, it was then bought by William Sanudo, Lord of Syros and son and heir of Marco II Sanudo, Duke of the Archipelago. Learning of this, the Ghisi invaded Syros and besieged William in his castle. At the same time, however, an Angevin fleet made port in nearby Melos. As vassals of King Charles II of Naples, the Sanudi were entitled to his protection, and the entreaties of the lady of Melos, Cassandra Sanudo, bore fruit: making common cause with the Sanudo forces, the Angevins quickly forced the Ghisi to raise the siege. In the end, the issue of the donkey's ownership was referred to the Venetian bailo at Negroponte. The bailo managed to reconcile the two great families of the Archipelago and restore peace, but, as the historian of Frankish Greece William Miller observes, "only after 'more than 30,000 heavy soldi' had been expended for the sake of the animal, which had probably died in the interval".

== Sources ==
- Freely, John (2006). The Cyclades: Discovering the Greek Islands of the Aegean. I.B.Tauris. ISBN 1845111605.
- Miller, William (1908). The Latins in the Levant: A History of Frankish Greece (1204–1566). London: John Murray.
