= Agnese Ghisi =

Agnese Ghisi (died before August 1282), was Regent of Karystos in ca. 1266-69. She was a sister of Andrea Ghisi and Geremia Ghisi, and probably the wife of Othon de Cicon.

She was a member of the Ghisi family. She had a son, Guidotto, and a daughter, Anfelise. She became regent of Karystos for her son ca. 1266-69 after the death of her husband; the city was however captured by Licario ca. 1277 and Guidotto taken prisoner.

She died before August 18, 1282, when she is mentioned as defunct in her nephew's testament.
