= Ghisi =

Prominent Venetian noble family

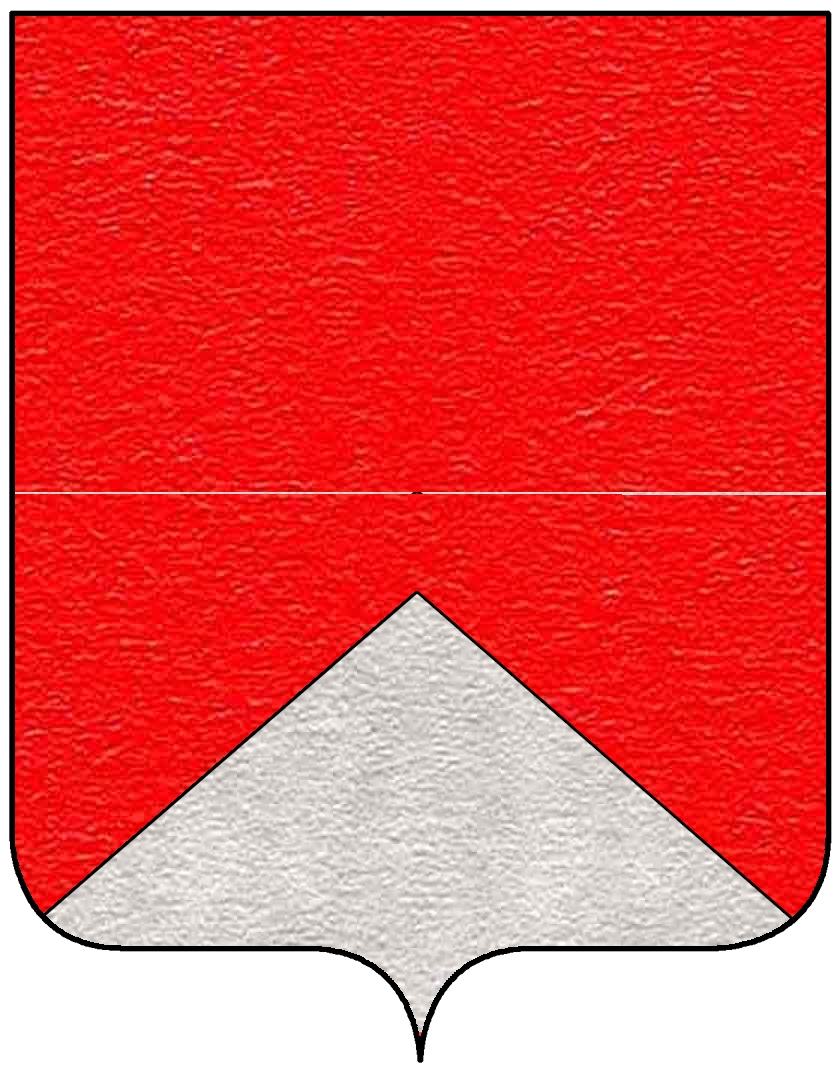
Coat of arms of Ghisi family

The House of Ghisi was a prominent Venetian noble family, originally from Padua or Aquileia.

== History ==
Following the establishment of Crusader states in Greece after the Fourth Crusade, the Ghisi became an important dynasty there. Andrea Ghisi became lord of the islands of Tinos and Mykonos, while his brother Geremia Ghisi became ruler of Skopelos, Skiathos, and Skyros. Later members of the family were also active in the Principality of Achaea and the Triarchy of Negroponte.

== Notable members ==
- Andrea Ghisi, Lord of Tinos and Mykonos (ca. 1207–1266/77)
  - Bartholomew I Ghisi, Lord of Tinos and Mykonos (before 1277–1303)
    - George I Ghisi, Baron of Chalandritsa (after 1285/86–1311), Lord of Tinos and Mykonos (1303–1311)
      - Bartholomew II Ghisi, Lord of Tinos and Mykonos (1311–1341), Triarch of Negroponte (1313–1341), Grand Constable of Achaea
        - George II Ghisi, Lord of Tinos and Mykonos and Triarch of Negroponte (1341–1352)
          - Bartholomew III Ghisi, Lord of Tinos and Mykonos and Triarch of Negroponte (1352–ca. 1385)
            - George III Ghisi, Lord of Tinos and Mykonos and Triarch of Negroponte (ca. 1385–1390)
- Geremia Ghisi, Lord of Skopelos, Skiathos, and Skyros (ca. 1207–1243/52), Lord of Andros (ca. 1239–1243/52)
  - Isabetta, was forcibly married to Filippo Ghisi, who thus became Lord of Skopelos, Skiathos, and Skyros until 1277
- Agnese Ghisi, wife of Othon de Cicon, Lord of Karystos

Others with the surname

- Martino Ghisi (1715–1794), Italian physician
- Giorgio Ghisi (1520—1582), Italian engraver
- Teodoro Ghisi (1536–1601), Italian painter and engraver

== Bibliography ==
- Loenertz, Raymond-Joseph (1975). Les Ghisi, dynastes vénitiens dans l'Archipel (1207-1390) (in French). Florence: Olschki.
