= Geremia Ghisi =

Venetian nobleman

Geremia Ghisi was a Venetian nobleman who in c. 1207, following the Fourth Crusade, captured the Greek islands of Skiathos, Skopelos, and Skyros and became their lord, while his brother Andrea Ghisi conquered the islands of Tinos and Mykonos. Their sister or half-sister, Agnese Ghisi, married Othon de Cicon, who became the lord of Karystos on Euboea.

In ca. 1239 Geremia, aided by his brother Andrea, expelled another Venetian nobleman, Marino Dandolo, from his fief of Andros. Dandolo died soon after, but his widow and sister brought a complaint before the Great Council of Venice, which in August 1243 ordered Geremia to restore Andros to the Dandolo heirs on pain of banishment from Venice and the sequestration of his and Andrea's properties there. Despite this decree, Geremia retained control of Andros until he died some years later. The island then reverted to the Duke of Naxos, Angelo Sanudo, but the affair continued to be a cause of dispute in the courts of Venice between Andrea Ghisi, the Sanudi, and the Querini claimants of the Dandolo inheritance, until the early 1290s, when Duke Marco II Sanudo bought out the claims of Niccolò Querini on Andros.

After Geremia's death, his relative Filippo Ghisi (married to Geremia's daughter Isabetta) seized control of Geremia's original fiefs until the Byzantines under Licario reconquered them in 1277 and took Filippo prisoner. Another daughter of Geremia, Marchesina, married the son of Doge Jacopo Tiepolo and future Doge (1268–75), Lorenzo Tiepolo.

== Notes ==
| New title | Lord of Skiathos, Skopelos, and Skyros ca. 1207 – after 1243 | Succeeded by Filippo Ghisi |
| Preceded by Marino Dandolo | Lord of Andros ca. 1239 – after 1243 | Succeeded by Angelo Sanudo |
