= Dragon houses =

Ruined buildings on Euboea, Greece

The dragon houses (Greek: Δρακόσπιτα, Drakospita) or Draga (Δραγκά) are some twenty large, ruined buildings found in the south of the island of Euboea, Greece. They were built with massive stone blocks without mortar and large stone slabs for the roofs. The Dragon House on Mount Ochi (Δρακόσπιτο της Όχης), north of Karystos is the most famous and well preserved. Other notable buildings are located in Palli-Lakka (Πάλλη-Λάκκα Δραγκά) and in Kapsala. In local folklore "dragons" are not only reptilian monsters but also beings with superhuman powers.

There is no accepted theory about the identity of the builders nor an agreed estimation on their dating. No mention is identified in classical texts and the first account is from the 18th-century British geologist, traveller and writer John Hawkins The first detailed account, after Hawkins was in 1842 by the German archaeologist H.N. Ulrichs.

The French classical scholar Jules Girard visited Euboea and described the Ochi dragon house, and provided further descriptions of the three Palli-Lakka Dragon houses

The Swiss archaeologist Karl Reber has tracked down all reported buildings and published a report in 2010.

== Gallery ==
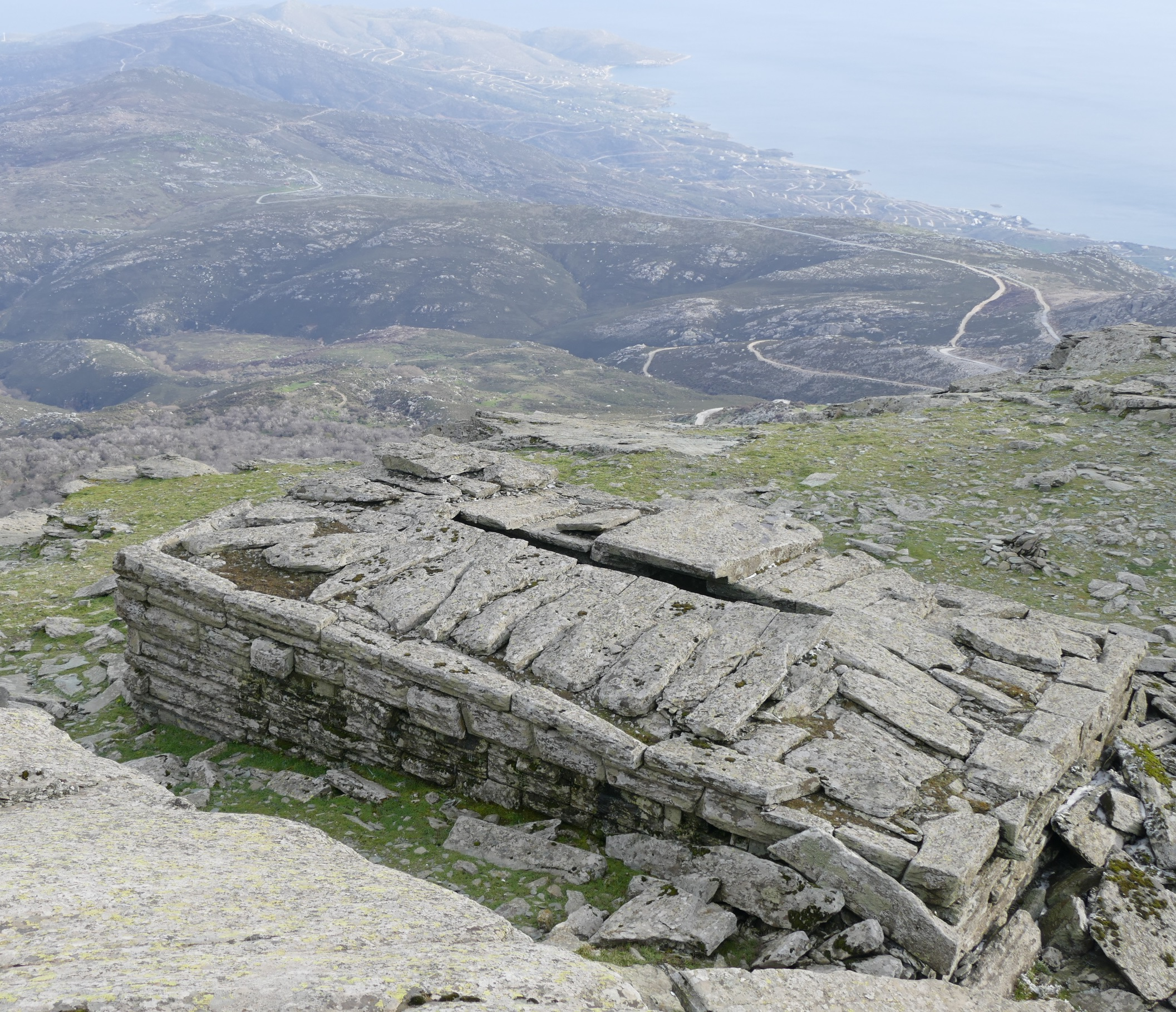
on Ochi (north)

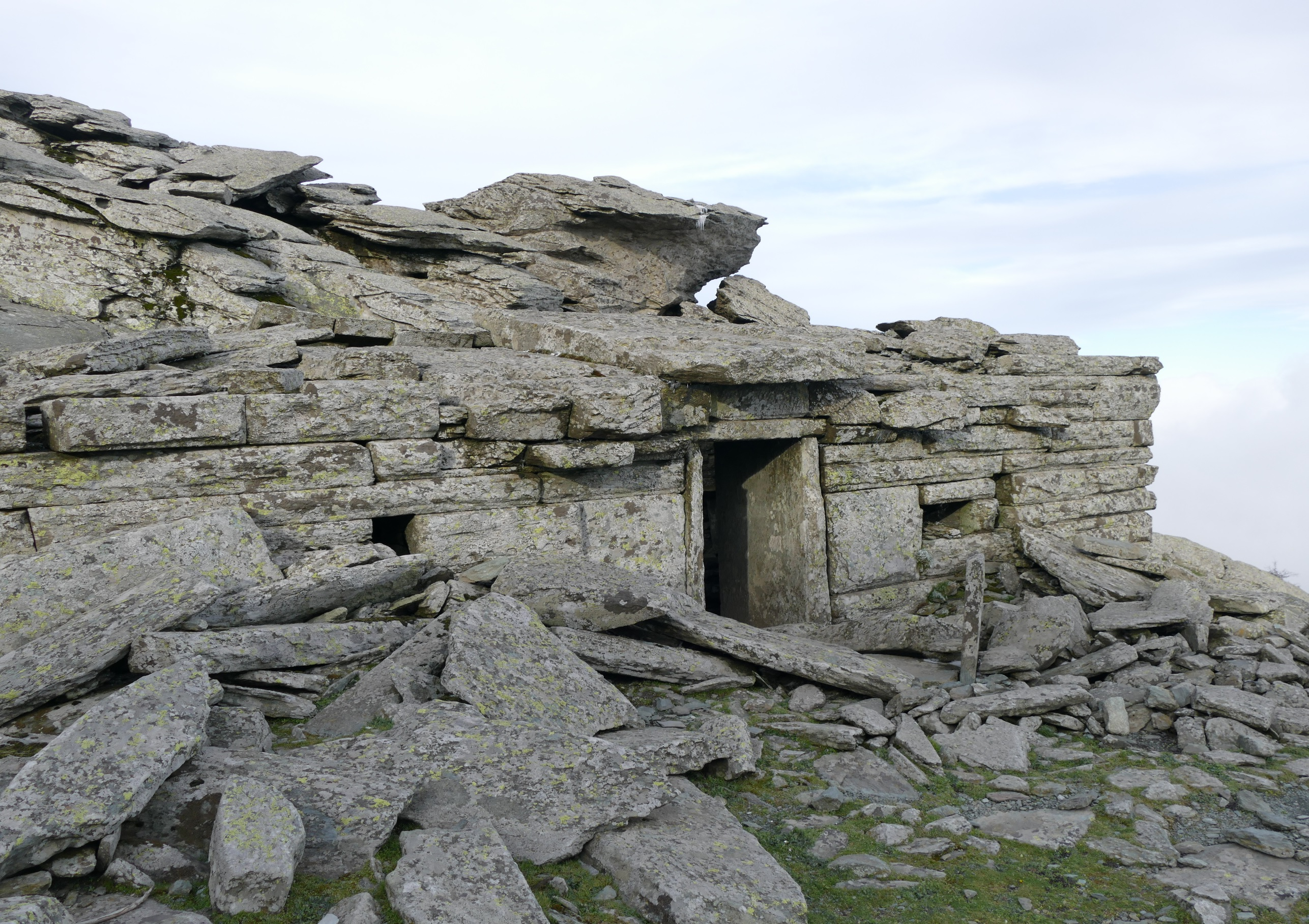
on Ochi (south)

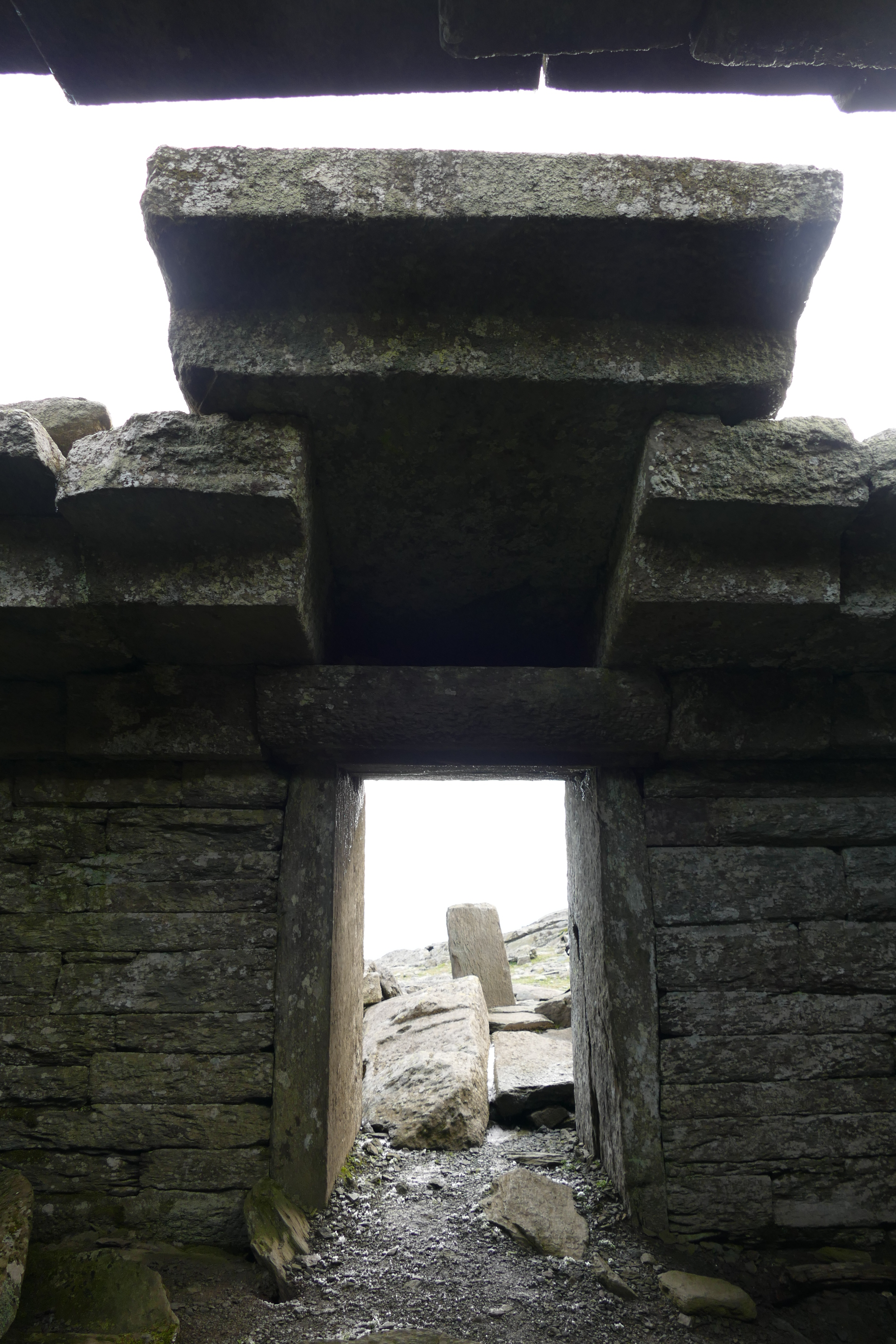
on Ochi (inside)

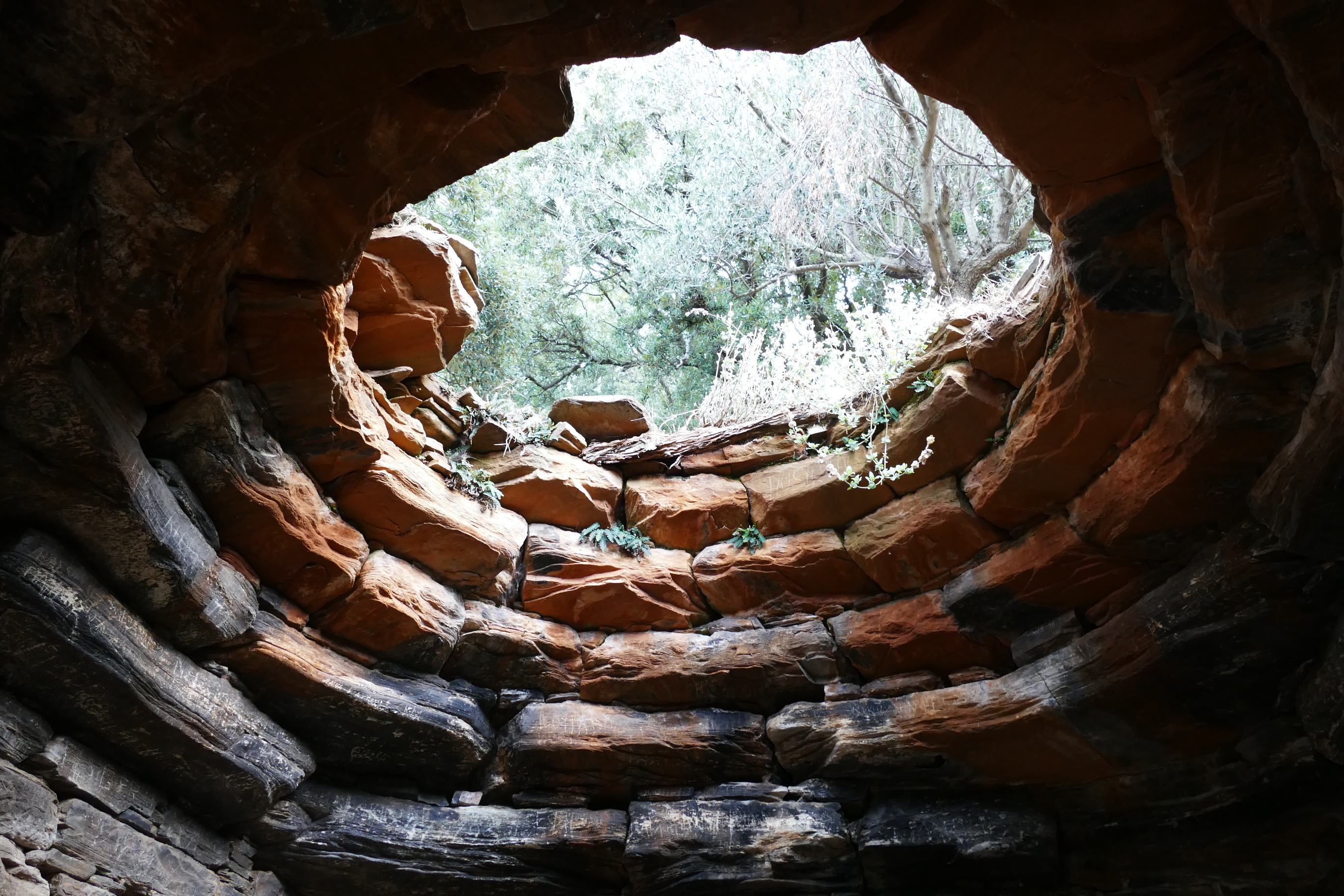
Palli-Lakka (east)

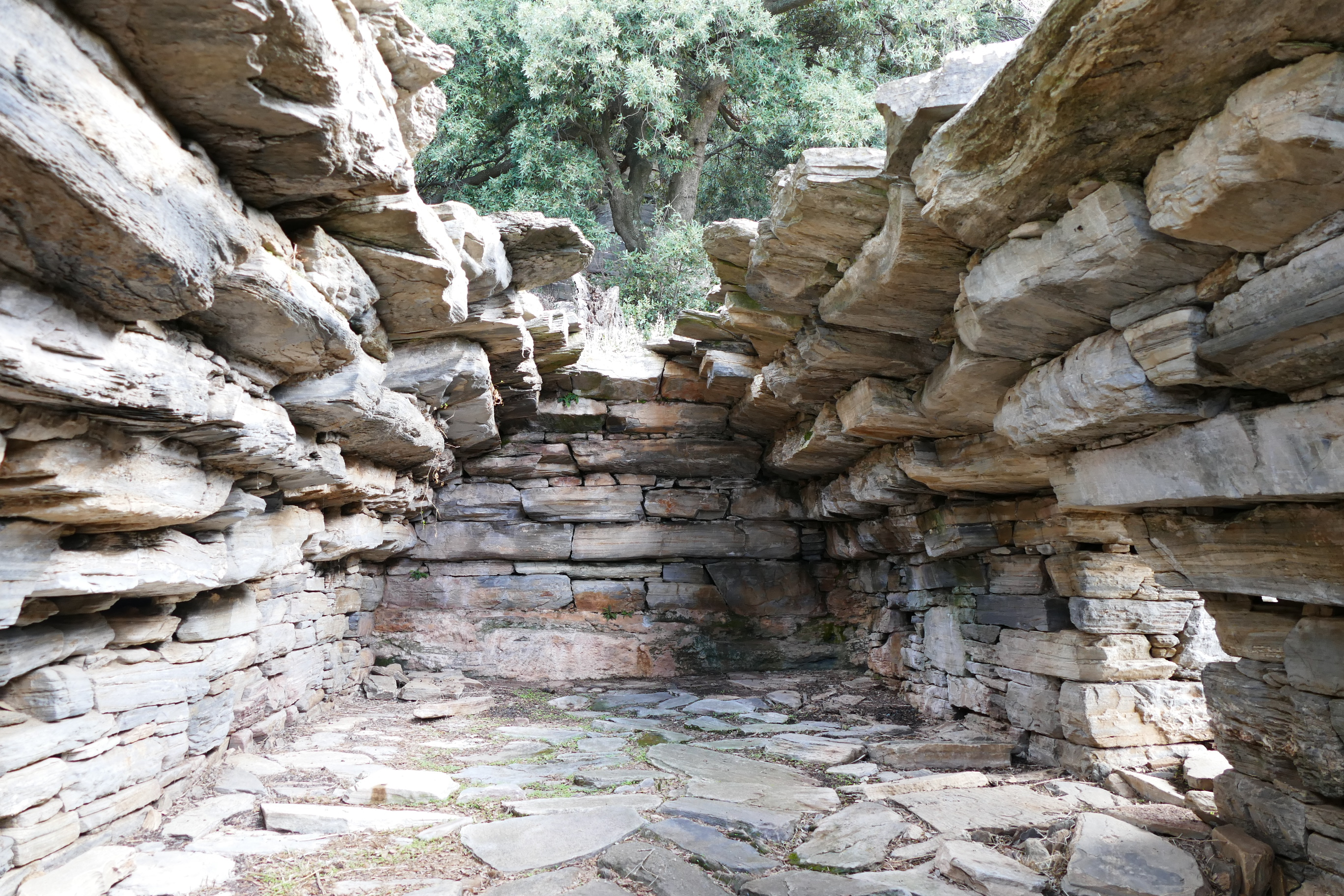
Palli-Lakka (north)

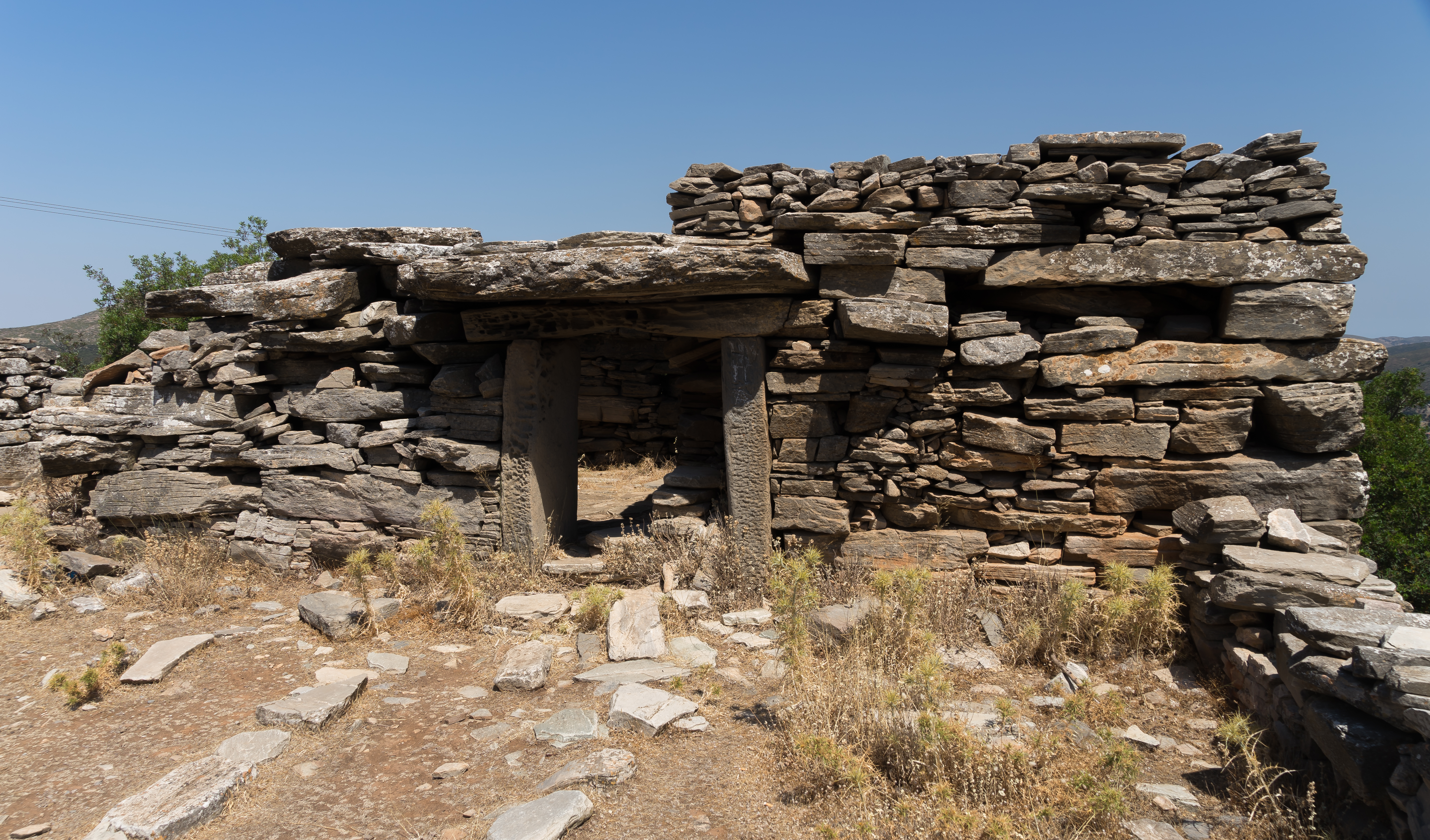
Kapsala
