= Great Sand Beach =

Beach of Evia, Greece

Coordinates: 38°02′01″N 24°18′22″E

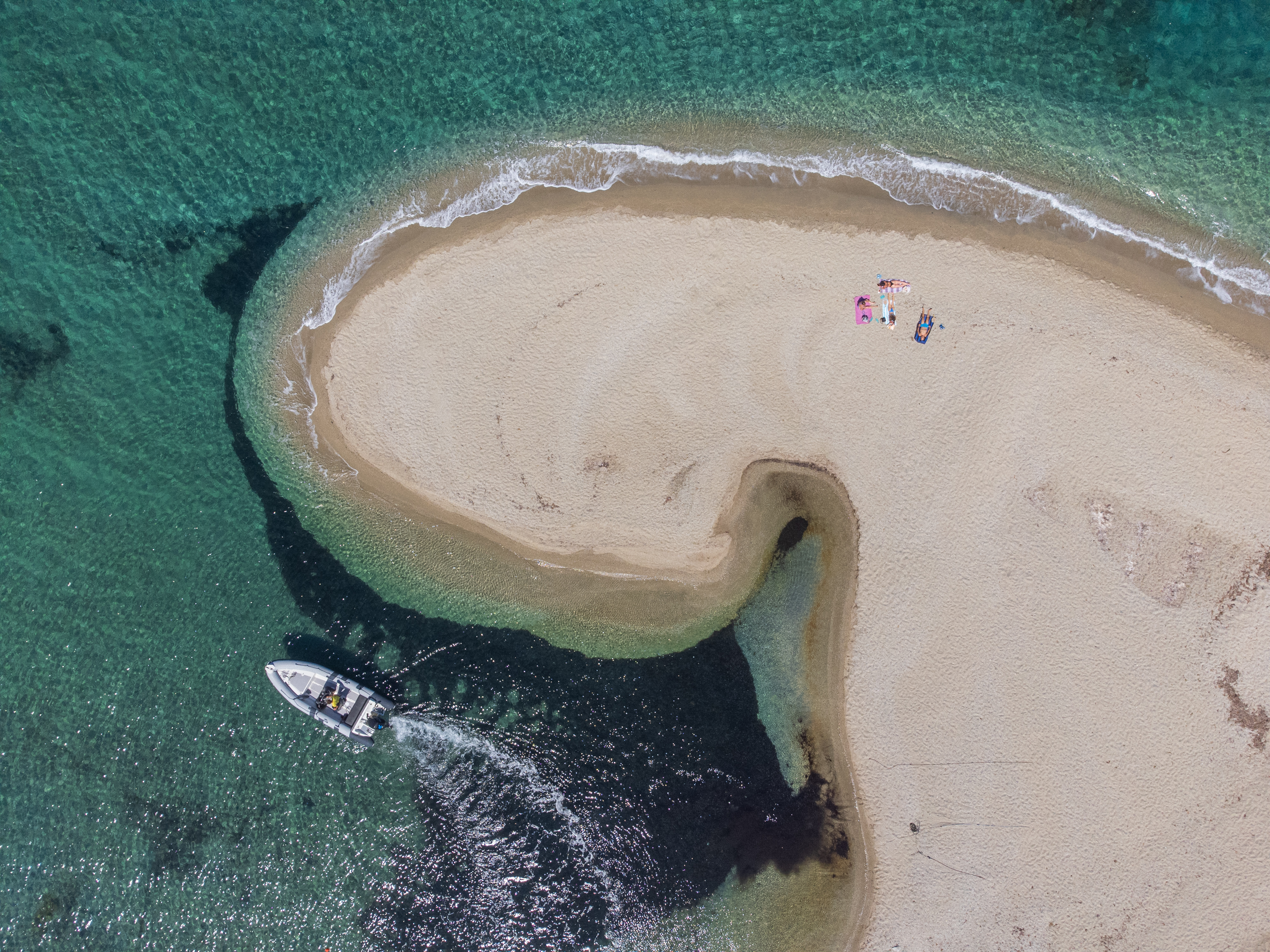
Partial top down view of the beach

Great Sand (Greek: Παραλία Μεγάλη Άμμος) is a Greek beach in the island of Evia, the second biggest island of Greece. The beach is in the South part of Evia and specifically in the southwest part of a small village called Marmari, opposite of Athens, the capital of Greece. Except of the name “Great Sand” (mostly used by the locals), it is also well known as “Golden Sand”.

== Location ==
Great Sand (or Golden Sand) is found in a small fish village called Marmari, in Evia Island. In between the Rafina Port and Marmari island there is the Petalioi Gulf, consisted of 9 private islands which are visible from Great Sand.

There are two main ways in which someone can have access to the village and afterwards, to the beach. The first one, is by a ferryboat taken from the Rafina’s port which is in the North Part of Athens, with duration no more than an hour. When arriving in Marmari driving or walking is a common practice to have access to the beach. The second way is ultimately by a vehicle. When someone starts from Athens and heads to Chalkida (the capital of Evia), then the only thing left when arriving, is to just drive directly to the South East part of the island, having most of the trip around the coastline of Evia. The driving is about 3 or 3half hours on average speed.

== Peculiarity ==
Τhe beach has a big circline line inside the sea surrounded by rocks, trees and scattered houses. The reason why this beach is so popular is its capacity of changing shape every year depending on the direction of waves, winds and water, creating in that way small lagoons on its surface. The coast has a length of almost 250 meters and a big width which can reach almost 60 meters. On the west part of the beach usually it can be created another small beach, having a south direction, which is better protected from weather conditions (like wind).

Due to the shape of the mountains surrounding the village of Marmari and the small area in between Evia island and Petalioi islands, a phenomenon called Venturi is created. The sea is calm only when south wind blows, or, if there is no wind at all. When north wind blows, it can become extremely aggressive if swimming further from the shore; as the sea stream can be dangerous especially for young children.

== Popularity ==
The spot is globally known due to sports European magazines which are presenting it as the most appropriate and suitable spot for the sea sport lovers. It was also a protagonist in the advertisement of the Greek Minister of Tourism in 2020 in which dominates the idea that “Greek summer is not only sun and sea, it's more than that”. Nevertheless, the beach is mostly popular to audience which is attracted by sea sports.

== Activities ==
Due to the strong winds and waves which surround the area, the beach attracts lovers of water sports like SUP surfers, kite surfers, wind surfers, jet ski, etc., making it one of the most favorable and ideal destinations for this particular reason. Wind surfers and kite surfers have found their “small paradise” there. Apart from this kind of sports, when the weather is calm, you can do other activities such as beach soccer, rackets, beach volley, etc.
