= Nicholas III dalle Carceri =

Ninth Duke of the Archipelago and Lord of Euboea

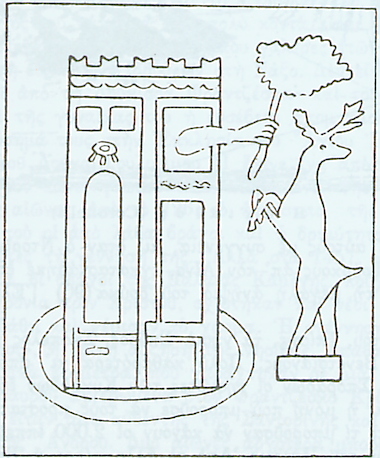
The coat of arms of the Dalle Carceri.

Nicholas III dalle Carceri (or Nicolò; died 1383), ninth Duke of the Archipelago and Lord of Euboea, was the only son of the first marriage of eighth Duchess Florence Sanudo, whom he succeeded in 1371, to Giovanni dalle Carceri, Lord of Euboea.

He married Petronilla, daughter of Leonardo I Tocco, without issue. He had an illegitimate son, named Francesco.

After his murder in 1383, Nicholas was succeeded by Francesco I Crispo, who had married his cousin Fiorenza I Sanudo, Lady of Milos.

He had two half-sisters by his mother's second marriage to their cousin Nicholas II Sanudo, called Spezzabanda, whom the Venetians entitled eight Consort Duke: Maria and Elisabetta Sanudo.

== Sources ==
- Miller, William (1908). The Latins in the Levant: A History of Frankish Greece (1204–1566). London: John Murray. OCLC 563022439.

Preceded by Florence	Duke of the Archipelago; 1371–1383	Succeeded by Francesco I
