= Guglielmazzo Sanudo, Lord of Gridia =

Italian noble

Guglielmazzo Sanudo, fl. between 1349 and 1362, was a Lord of Gridia.

== Ancestry ==
He was a son of Marco Sanudo, Lord of Gridia, and wife.

== Marriage and issue ==
He married ... and had Nicholas II Sanudo, called Spezzabanda, Lord of Gridia (a fief in Andros)) and eight Consort Duke of the Archipelago, second husband of his cousin Florence Sanudo, seventh Duchess of the Archipelago, with whom he reigned until her death.

== Sources ==
- Miller, William (1908). The Latins in the Levant: A History of Frankish Greece (1204–1566). London: John Murray. OCLC 563022439.
