= Othon de Cicon =

Baron of Karystos in medieval Greece

Othon de Cicon was a Frankish noble and baron of Karystos on the island of Euboea (Negroponte) in medieval Greece.

Othon was the son of Jacques de Cicon and Sibylle de la Roche, the sister of the first Duke of Athens, Othon de la Roche. After Jacques' death, the lordship of Cicon (located in the area of Vanclans) passed in part to Othon's brother Ponce, while Othon himself went to Greece, where by 1250 he became baron of Karystos on the southern tip of Euboea. In the War of the Euboeote Succession, he sided with the Prince of Achaea William II of Villehardouin, and armed a galley to support him.

In 1261, following the recovery of Constantinople by the Byzantine Greeks of the Empire of Nicaea, the fugitive Latin Emperor Baldwin II arrived at Euboea. There Othon loaned him 5,000 gold hyperpyra, which Baldwin later repaid by, among others, giving him the right arm of Saint John the Baptist, with which Jesus Christ was baptized. Othon sent it to the Cîteaux Abbey in his native Burgundy in 1263. Nothing further is known of Othon after that, and he probably died in ca. 1264/5. He appears to have been married to Agnese Ghisi, sister (or half-sister) of Geremia and Andrea Ghisi, and had at least one son, Guidotto, who was taken prisoner by Licario, a renegade Italian in Byzantine service, when the latter captured Karystos in ca. 1277.

== Sources ==
- Longnon, Jean (1973). "Les premiers ducs d'Athènes et leur famille". Journal des Savants (in French). 1 (1): 61–80. doi:10.3406/jds.1973.1278. ISSN 1775-383X.
- Setton, Kenneth M. (1976). The Papacy and the Levant (1204–1571), Volume I: The Thirteenth and Fourteenth Centuries. Philadelphia: The American Philosophical Society. ISBN 0-87169-114-0.
