= Ca' Sanudo Turloni, Venice =

Gothic-style palace in Venice, Italy

Coordinates: 45.438235°N 12.329026°E

Ca’ Sanudo Turloni is a Gothic-style palace located with a façade on Rio de Sant'Antonio, and located in Calle Pezzana #2162, in the Sestiere San Polo in Venice, Italy. It is aless than 50 meters North West of Piazza San Polo.

== History ==
The palace was constructed likely by the 13th-century in Venetian Byzantine style by the old aristocratic Sanudo family, and remained in possession of the family till 1852, when the last member of the male line, Francesco Livio, died by 1852. He sold the property to Angelo Revedin. By 2015, palace has been divided into apartments.

The main facade on the Rio has Venetian Gothic design, refurbished in Renaissance style. Over the centuries, the palace underwent many modifications, including rising to five stories. The inner courtyard had a well. The interior retains a few frescoes by Gaspare Diziani. A portion of the palace once abutted the Campo San Polo. It now has been subdivided into apartments.

The Palazzo Soranzo Van Axel in Cannaregio belonged in the 17th century to the Sanudo.
