= Nicholas I Sanudo =

Italian noble (died 1341)

Nicholas I Sanudo (or Niccolò; died 1341) was the fifth duke of the Archipelago from 1323 to his death. He was the son and successor of William I of the House of Sanudo.

Nicholas fought under his brother-in-law Walter, duke of Athens, at the disastrous Battle of Halmyros on 15 March 1311. He was one of the few knights on the losing side to escape with his life and liberty.

When John of Gravina, the prince of Achaea, came to the Morea in 1325 in an attempt to reverse the recent Byzantine gains, Nicholas, as a vassal of Achaea, went to his assistance. He fought in John of Gravina's futile siege of the castle of Karytaina, and when John left the Morea in spring 1326, he entrusted Nicholas with the conduct of military operations. At some point thereafter, he scored a success against a numerically superior Byzantine army that was raiding the Principality. After that, he left the Morea. Nicholas was the last duke of Naxos to command troops in the mainland.

He was succeeded by his brother John I. His other brother was Marco Sanudo, lord of Milos.

== Family ==
Nicholas was married to Joanna of Brienne, the daughter of Hugh of Brienne, count of Lecce (c. 1240 – 1296) and Helena Komnene Doukaina, a daughter of John I Doukas of Thessaly.

== Sources ==
- Bon, Antoine (1969). La Morée franque. Recherches historiques, topographiques et archéologiques sur la principauté d'Achaïe [The Frankish Morea. Historical, Topographic and Archaeological Studies on the Principality of Achaea] (in French). Paris: De Boccard. OCLC 869621129.
- Frazee, Charles A. (1988). The Island Princes of Greece. The Dukes of the Archipelago. Amsterdam: Adolf M. Hakkert. ISBN 9025609481.
- Loenertz, Raymond-Joseph (1975). Les Ghisi, dynastes vénitiens dans l'Archipel (1207-1390) (in French). Florence: Olschki.
- Setton, Kenneth M. (1976). The Papacy and the Levant (1204–1571), Volume I: The Thirteenth and Fourteenth Centuries. Vol. 1. Philadelphia: The American Philosophical Society. ISBN 0-87169-114-0.
- Topping, Peter (1975). "The Morea, 1311–1364". In Setton, Kenneth M.; Hazard, Harry W. (eds.). A History of the Crusades, Volume III: The Fourteenth and Fifteenth Centuries. Vol. 3. Madison and London: University of Wisconsin Press. pp. 104–140. ISBN 0-299-06670-3.

Preceded by William I	Duke of the Archipelago; 1323–1341	Succeeded by John I
