= Giovanni dalle Carceri =

14th-century leader of Euboea

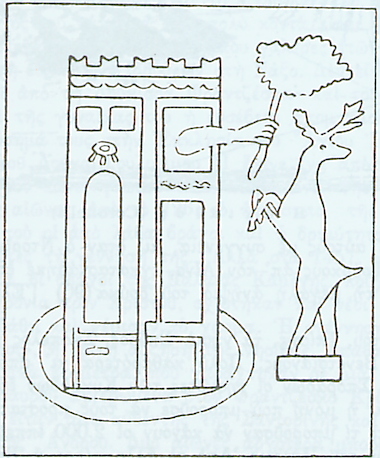
Coat of arms for the House of dalle Carceri

Giovanni dalle Carceri (died 1358) was a Lord of Euboea.

He was the son of Peter dalle Carceri and his second wife. He married Florence Sanudo, who became the seventh Duchess of the Archipelago in 1362, daughter and successor of John I, Duke of the Archipelago. Their son was Nicholas III dalle Carceri, who inherited both the Duchy and the Lordship.

== Sources ==
- Miller, William. The Latins in the Levant: A History of Frankish Greece (1204–1566). London: 1908.
