= Nicholas II Sanudo =

Italian noble (died aft. 1374)

Nicholas II Sanudo (or Niccolò, also called Spezzabanda; died aft. 1374) was the Lord of Gridia (a fief in Andros) and eighth Duke of the Archipelago as the husband and co-ruler of Florence Sanudo from 1364 to 1371.

Nicholas was a son of Guglielmazzo Sanudo, Lord of Gridia. Florence's first marriage was to Giovanni dalle Carceri, but he died in 1358, without issue. She tried to remarry, first to the Vignoso, Genoese Lord of Chios, and then to Nerio I Acciajuoli, the future Duke of Athens, but both potential husbands were vetoed by the Republic of Venice, which kidnapped her and brought to Crete. There she was forced to marry in 1364 her cousin Nicholas Spezzabanda. Florence died in 1371.

By his wife Florence, he left only daughters: Maria, who inherited Andros, and Elisabetta Sanudo.

== Sources ==
- Miller, William (1908). The Latins in the Levant: A History of Frankish Greece (1204–1566). London: John Murray. OCLC 563022439.

| Preceded by Florence | Duke of the Archipelago; 1364–1371 | Succeeded by Nicholas III |
