= Marco II Sanudo =

Third Duke of the Archipelago

Marco II Sanudo (died c. 1303) was the third Duke of the Archipelago from 1262 to his death.

== Family ==
Marco was the eldest son and successor of Angelo Sanudo. According to The Latins in the Levant. A History of Frankish Greece (1204-1566) (1908) by William Miller, his mother was "a French dame of high degree", daughter of Macaire de Saint-Ménéhould. In 1262, his mother reportedly welcomed Baldwin II of Courtenay who was attempting to reclaim the throne of the Latin Empire.

His paternal grandfather and namesake was Marco I Sanudo. According to Miller, Marco II's maternal grandmother was "Laskaraina", a woman of the Laskaris family. Miller identified her as a sister of Constantine Laskaris and Theodore I Laskaris. He based this theory on his own interpretation of Italian chronicles. The "Dictionnaire historique et Généalogique des grandes familles de Grèce, d'Albanie et de Constantinople" (1983) by Mihail-Dimitri Sturdza rejected the theory, based on the silence of Byzantine primary sources.

== Reign ==
Marco lost some of his islands to the Byzantine Empire early in his reign, but he recovered them two decades later, in time to leave the whole of the original duchy to his son William I.

== Children ==
Marco II had at least two known children. The identity of his wife is unknown. The children were:

- William I Sanudo.
- Marco Sanudo, Lord of Gridia. His grandson Nicholas II Sanudo, was the second consort of Florence Sanudo. Florence was the ruler of the Duchy of the Archipelago from 1362 to her death in 1371.

== Sources ==
- Setton, Kenneth M.; Wolff, Robert Lee; Hazard, Harry W., eds. (1969) [1962]. A History of the Crusades, Volume II: The Later Crusades, 1189–1311 (Second ed.). Madison, Milwaukee, and London: University of Wisconsin Press. ISBN 0-299-04844-6.

| Preceded by Angelo | Duke of the Archipelago; 1262–1303 | Succeeded by William I |
