= William I Sanudo =

Italian noble (died ca. 1323)

William I Sanudo (or Guglielmo; died ca. 1323) was the fourth Duke of the Archipelago from 1303 to his death. He was the son and successor of Marco II.

In his youth, he was involved in the War of the Ass with the Ghisi. William's father succeeded in reacquiring some territories he had lost shortly before he left the intact duchy to his son. William's son and successor, Nicholas, was one of the few knights to escape from the Battle of Halmyros in 1311. His other sons were John I and Marco Sanudo, Lord of Milos.

== Sources ==
- Setton, Kenneth M. (general editor) A History of the Crusades: Volume II — The Later Crusades, 1189 – 1311. Robert Lee Wolff and Harry W. Hazard, editors. University of Wisconsin Press: Milwaukee, 1969.
- Setton, Kenneth M. (general editor) A History of the Crusades: Volume III — The Fourteenth and Fifteenth Centuries. Harry W. Hazard, editor. University of Wisconsin Press: Madison, 1975.

Preceded by Marco II	Duke of the Archipelago; 1303–1323	Succeeded by Nicholas I
