= Candiano =

Candiano is a surname. Notable people with the surname include:

- Alexandru Candiano-Popescu (1841–1901), Romanian army general, lawyer, journalist and poet
- Arcielda Candiano (c. 927–959), Dogaressa of Venice
- Giovanniccia Candiano, Dogaressa of Venice
- Pietro I Candiano (c. 842–887), Doge of Venice
- Pietro II Candiano (c. 872–939), Doge of Venice
- Pietro III Candiano (died c. 960), Doge of Venice
- Pietro IV Candiano (died 976), Doge of Venice
- Vitale Candiano (died 979), Doge of Venice

== See also ==
- Candiano Canal, is a canal connecting the Italian city of Ravenna to the Adriatic Sea
