= Ochi (mountain) =

Mountain in Greece

- Όχη
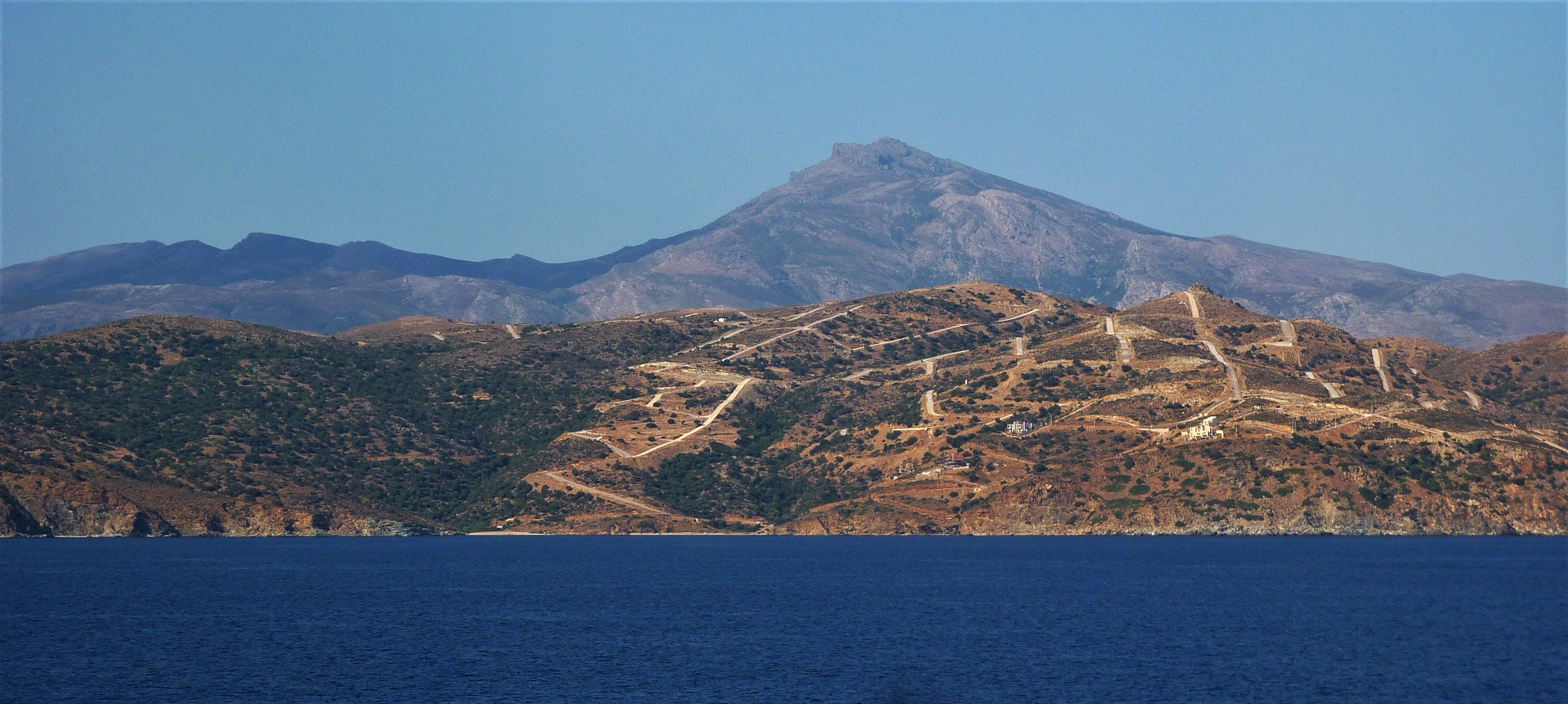

Highest point
- Elevation: 1,398 m (4,587 ft)
- Prominence: 1,283 m (4,209 ft)
- Listing: Ribu
- Coordinates: 38°03′35″N 24°28′00″E

Naming
- Pronunciation: Greek: [ˈoçi]

Geography
- Location within Greece
- Location: southeastern Euboea

Ochi (Greek: Όχη; Latin: Oche mons) is a mountain in the southeasternmost part of the island of Euboea, Greece. Its maximum elevation is 1,398 m. While most of the mountain range is covered with grassland and bushes, there are forests on the northern slopes. It is 6 km northeast of the coastal town of Karystos, 90 km southeast of the island capital Chalcis and 65 km east of Athens.

== See also ==
- List of mountains in Greece
