= Andrea Ghisi =

Lord of Tinos and Mykonos
- In office 1207–1266/77
- Succeeded by: Bartholomew I Ghisi

Personal details
- Died: 1266/77
- Relations: Brother: Geremia Ghisi; Sister: Agnese Ghisi
- Children: Bartholomew I Ghisi and others

Andrea Ghisi was a Venetian nobleman, and the first Lord of Tinos and Mykonos.

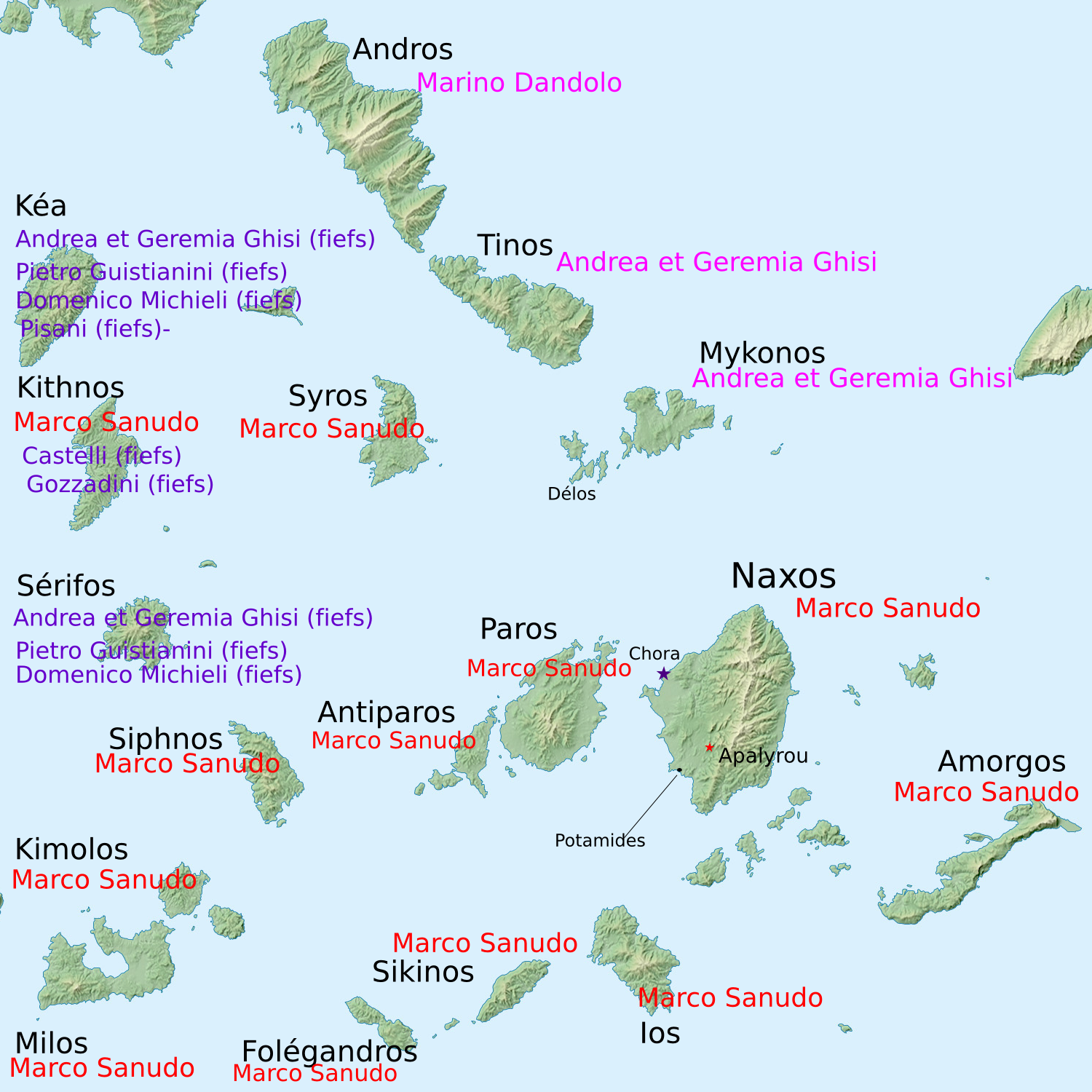
Repartition of the Aegean islands amongst the conquerors.

There are no sources about him until 1207 when he participated in the expedition organized by Marco Sanudo for the conquest of the Greek islands which, three years after the fall of Constantinople to the Fourth Crusade, had not yet been occupied by the victors. He is not to be confused with the 17th-century Andrea Ghisi, from the same family, who devised a game called Laberinto ("Labyrinth").

According to Andrea Dandolo, Andrea and his brother Geremia received together possession over Tinos, Mykonos, Skyros, Skopelos and Skiathos, and after the division of these possessions among themselves, Andrea obtained Tinos and Mykonos. The two brothers were not vassals of Sanudo's Duchy of Naxos, however, but directly under the Latin Empire.

In 1243 he was engaged with his brother in a long dispute with the Republic of Venice. During the campaign of 1207, the island of Andros had been assigned to Marino Dandolo but at an unknown date (probably between 1238 and 1239), Geremia had seized it by force. Dandolo appealed to the Venetian government but died soon after. This, however, did not prevent the Great Council of Venice on 11 August 1243 from condemning the Ghisi brothers to confiscation of their property, and ordering the Doge of Venice Jacopo Tiepolo to force the restitution of the island. Andrea and Geremia were also ordered to present themselves before the Doge and submit to the Council's decision by 29 June 1244, on pain of exile from Venice and the auctioning of their possessions for the benefit of the dispossessed Dandolo family.

The Ghisi probably continued their occupation of Andros, as it was more beneficial to them than the Republic's conditions. As Geremia died some time after August 1243, it was Andrea alone who was eventually exiled from Venice and his possessions auctioned off. By 1251, however, both sides softened their stance and Andrea resolved to submit to new and more lenient demands. From the terms of the agreement, it is clear that he was no longer in direct possession of Andros, which may have devolved to a vassal of the Duchy of Naxos. After fulfilling his obligations, on 28 March 1253, his exile was lifted by the Great Council, but the reclamation of his auctioned goods was long-drawn out affair; even in 1280, years after his death, some still had not been recovered.

The last information about Andrea Ghisi comes from an act signed in 1266. He had died by 19 March 1277, when his son Bartholomew appears as lord of Tinos and Mykonos. Apart from Bartholomew, Andrea had six sons (of which only one Marino, survived him) and one daughter, Anfelise, who married Pietro Querini.

== Family ==
Andrea Ghisi had a sister (Agnese Ghisi) and a brother (Geremia Ghisi).

== Sources ==
- Ravegnano, Giorgio (2000). "GHISI, Andrea". Dizionario Biografico degli Italiani (in Italian). Vol. 54: Ghiselli–Gimma. Rome: Istituto dell'Enciclopedia Italiana. ISBN 978-88-12-00032-6.

New title	Lord of Tinos and Mykonos; 1207 – 1266/77	Succeeded by Bartholomew I Ghisi
