= Marino Dandolo =

Venetian nobleman

Marino Dandolo (Greek: Μαρίνος Δάνδολος; died before 1243) was a Venetian nobleman and first Latin ruler of the island of Andros following the Fourth Crusade. He was a member of the prominent Dandolo family. He accompanied Marco Sanudo on the conquest of the Aegean Islands in 1207, and was awarded the island of Andros as a sub-fief. He was expelled from his island around 1239 by Geremia Ghisi, and died in exile before August 1243.

== Sources ==
- Hopf, Carl Hermann Friedrich Johann (1873). Chroniques Gréco-Romanes Inédites ou peu Connues. Berlin, Germany: Librairie de Weidmann.
- Loenertz, Raymond-Joseph (1970). Marino Dandolo, seigneur d'Andros, et son conflit avec l'évêque Jean in "Byzantina et Franco-Graeca". Roma.
- Miller, William (1908). The Latins in the Levant, a History of Frankish Greece (1204–1566). New York: E.P. Dutton and Company.
- Setton, Kenneth M. (1976). The Papacy and the Levant (1204–1571), Volume I: The Thirteenth and Fourteenth Centuries. Philadelphia: The American Philosophical Society. ISBN 0-87169-114-0.

New title	Lord of Andros; 1207 – 1239	Succeeded by Geremia Ghisi
