= Marmari =

Village in Greece

Marmari Μαρμάρι
- Municipal unit
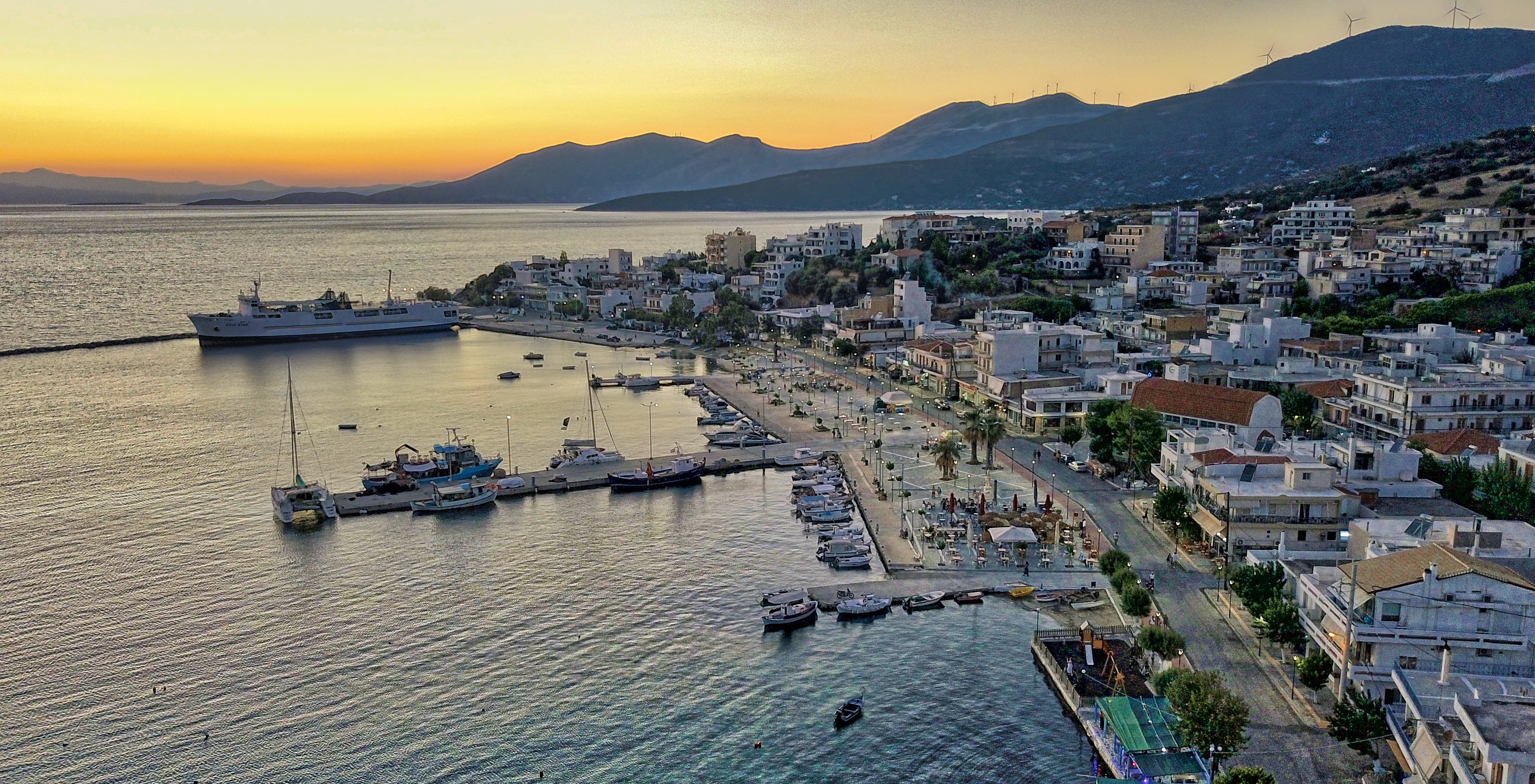
- Port of Marmari during summer sunset

- Location within the regional unit

- Location within Greece
- Coordinates: 38°3′N 24°19′E
- Country: Greece
- Administrative region: Central Greece
- Regional unit: Euboea
- Municipality: Karystos

Area
  - Municipal unit: 241.33 km^{2} (93.18 sq mi)
- Elevation: 15 m (49 ft)

Population (2021)
  - Municipal unit: 1,972
  - Municipal unit density: 8.171/km^{2} (21.16/sq mi)
  - Community: 1,163
- Time zone: UTC+2 (EET)
  - Summer (DST): UTC+3 (EEST)
- Postal code: 340 13
- Area code: 2223
- Vehicle registration: ΧΑ

Marmari (Greek: Μαρμάρι, Katharevousa: Μαρμάριον) is a village and a former municipality in Euboea, Greece, in the southeastern end of the island. Since the 2011 local government reform it is part of the municipality Karystos, of which it is a municipal unit. Marmari has an area of 241.332 km^{2}. The Greek National Road 44 (Chalkida - Karystos) runs through it and there are ferry routes with the mainland port of Rafina. The mountains dominate the east. Its main economy are local businesses and agriculture. Marmari is located southeast of Chalkida, east of Rafina and west of Karystos.

== Other ==
Marmari currently has two schools: a middle school and a junior high school. It is surrounded by beautiful beaches which frequently host surfers from across the globe. Marmari is also home to Eastern Orthodox Christian churches. Marmari has many taverns. It is approximately one hour away from the port city of Rafina.

The area is a rich source of hard stones, with Karystos stone being one of the most popular. Their extraction and processing has been one of the oldest occupations of the inhabitants.

Sights of the area are: Saint George church and chrissi ammos (golden sand) beach. It is located across the island of Petalion and is a popular windsurfing or kitesurfing destination. National Geographic magazine ranks Marmari between the top 10 best sailing destinations.

== Sporting teams ==
- Football: Marmari FC, A.O.Marmariou, Marmari

== See also ==
- List of settlements in the Euboea regional unit
