= Bartholomew I Ghisi =

Bartholomew I Ghisi (Italian: Bartolommeo Ghisi; died 1303) was the Venetian hereditary lord of the islands of Tenos and Mykonos in the Cyclades in Frankish Greece. He was the son of the conqueror of these islands, Andrea Ghisi, and lived to a very advanced age (he is recorded as "very old" in 1290). He was succeeded by his son, George I Ghisi.

== Sources ==
- Bon, Antoine (1969). La Morée franque. Recherches historiques, topographiques et archéologiques sur la principauté d'Achaïe [The Frankish Morea. Historical, Topographic and Archaeological Studies on the Principality of Achaea] (in French). Paris: De Boccard. pp. 167, 234–235, 703. OCLC 869621129.
- Setton, Kenneth M. (1976). The Papacy and the Levant (1204–1571), Volume I: The Thirteenth and Fourteenth Centuries. Philadelphia: The American Philosophical Society. p. 433, note 136. ISBN 0-87169-114-0.

Preceded by Andrea Ghisi	Lord of Tinos and Mykonos before 1277 – 1303	Succeeded by George I Ghisi
