= Marco Sanudo, Lord of Gridia =

Italian noble

Marco Sanudo was a Lord of Gridia (a fief in Andros).

== Ancestry ==
He was the son of Marco II Sanudo, third Duke of the Archipelago, and the brother of William I Sanudo, fourth Duke of the Archipelago.

== Marriage and issue ==
He married ... and had Guglielmazzo Sanudo, Lord of Gridia.
