= Angelo Sanudo =

Duke of the Archipelago (Naxos), Greece

Angelo Sanudo (died 1262) was the second Duke of the Archipelago from 1227, when his father, Marco I, died, until his own death.

== Family ==
Angelo was a son of Marco I Sanudo. According to "The Latins in the Levant. A History of Frankish Greece (1204-1566)" (1908) by William Miller, Marco I married ... Laskaraina, a woman of the Laskaris family. Miller identified her as a sister of Constantine Laskaris and Theodore I Laskaris. He based this theory on his own interpretation of Italian chronicles. The Dictionnaire historique et Généalogique des grandes familles de Grèce, d'Albanie et de Constantinople (1983) by Mihail-Dimitri Sturdza rejected the theory, based on the silence of Byzantine primary sources.

== Reign ==
In 1235, Angelo sent a naval squadron to the defence of Constantinople, where the Emperor John of Brienne was being besieged by John III Doukas Vatatzes, Emperor of Nicaea, and Ivan Asen II of Bulgaria. By Angelo's further intervention, a truce was signed between the two empires for two years.

Angelo was succeeded by his son Marco II.

== Marriage and children ==
Angelo married a daughter of Macaire de Sainte-Ménéhould, a baron of the Latin Empire who died in the battle of Poimanenon. In 1261, at Thebes, she welcomed Baldwin II of Courtenay who was fleeing Constantinople after its fall to the hands of the Byzantines. They had at least three children:

- Marco II Sanudo.
- Marino Sanudo, Lord of Paros and Antiparos. Married Porzia da Verona, a daughter of William I da Verona, Triarch of Negroponte, by his first wife whose name is unknown.
- Maria Sanudo. Married Paolo Navigajoso, Lord of Lemnos. Her husband resisted attempts by the Byzantine Empire to annex his island. He died in 1277. She took over the defense of the island but abandoned her efforts in 1278.

== Sources ==
- Setton, Kenneth M.; Wolff, Robert Lee; Hazard, Harry W., eds. (1969) [1962]. A History of the Crusades, Volume II: The Later Crusades, 1189–1311. Vol. 2 (Second ed.). Madison, Milwaukee, and London: University of Wisconsin Press. ISBN 0-299-04844-6.

Preceded by Marco I	Duke of the Archipelago; 1227–1262	Succeeded by Marco II
