= Marco I Sanudo =

First Duke of the Duchy of the Archipelago

Marco Sanudo (c. 1153 Eraclea – between 1220 and 1230, most probably 1227) was the creator and first Duke of the Duchy of the Archipelago, in Italian: "Duca del Mare Egeo e Re di Candia", Barone delle Isole di Nasso, Pario, Milo, Marine ed Andri, duchy granted by the Republic of Venice to him and all his descendants. After the Fourth Crusade his lineage became named Sanudo de Candia.

Maternal nephew of Venetian doge Enrico Dandolo, he was a participant in the Fourth Crusade (1204). He was part of the negotiations when the Republic of Venice bought the island of Crete from Boniface of Montferrat.

Between 1205 and 1207, or a little after 1213-1214, he gathered a fleet and captured the island of Naxos, laying the foundations of the Duchy of the Archipelago. He built a new capital city on the island, Kastro (now the main port). During his reign, he blended the Byzantine and Venetian organizations.

He became vassal of the Latin Emperor Henry of Flanders around 1210 or 1216. For his lord, he fought against the Empire of Nicaea. But for Venice, he took part in the Cretan expedition of 1211.

== Sources ==
All biographies of Marco Sanudo were written in the centuries after the facts they tell. Most of them are Venetian chronicles dating from the 14th and 15th centuries. In the first one, Istoria di Romania, Marino Sanudo Torsello, a member of the Sanudo family, writes about Marco Sanudo only this:

he conquered the islands.

Doge Andrea Dandolo wrote a history of Venice (called Chronica extensa) around 1350. This text is the first to relate the conquest of the Aegean islands and has been the foundation of all later accounts:

Sailing separately, Marco Sanudo and those following him conquered the islands of Naxos, Paros, Milos and Santorini, and Marino Dandolo conquered Andros. Also, Andrea and Geremia Ghisi [took] Tinos, Mykonos, Skyros, Skopelos and Skiathos.

A chronicle in Venetian dated 1360-1362 and attributed to an Enrico Dandolo gives a short biography of Marco Sanudo, starting with his struggle in Crete against Enrico Pescatore. But the text is not reliable; most of it is either invented or contradicted by official documents. Also, it is the first text to state that Marco Sanudo and Doge Enrico Dandolo were related. In 1454, Flavio Biondo published his De Origine et gestis Venetorum, in which he copied Andrea Dandolo's account and introduced the idea of the Venetian Republic giving to its citizens the official right to conquer lands in the Orient, as long as they would never be transmitted to a non-Venetian. This rule, asserted in the 15th century, is thus extended to the start of the 13th century by Biondo.

The most commonly used chronicle, because it gives a lot of geographical and chronological details, is the one written by Daniele Barbaro in the 16th century. He combined different older chronicles to create a coherent story based on the accounts of the two Dandolos. His version is the one used by all later writers and historians, such as J. K. Fotheringham in 1915. Guillaume Saint-Guillain, in a 2004 article, suggests another interpretation, based on his recent works on official documents.

The Histoire nouvelle des anciens Ducs de l'Archipel, another widely used account, was written in the second half of the 17th century by a French Jesuit from Naxos monastery, Father Saulger.

== Biography ==
=== Family and youth ===
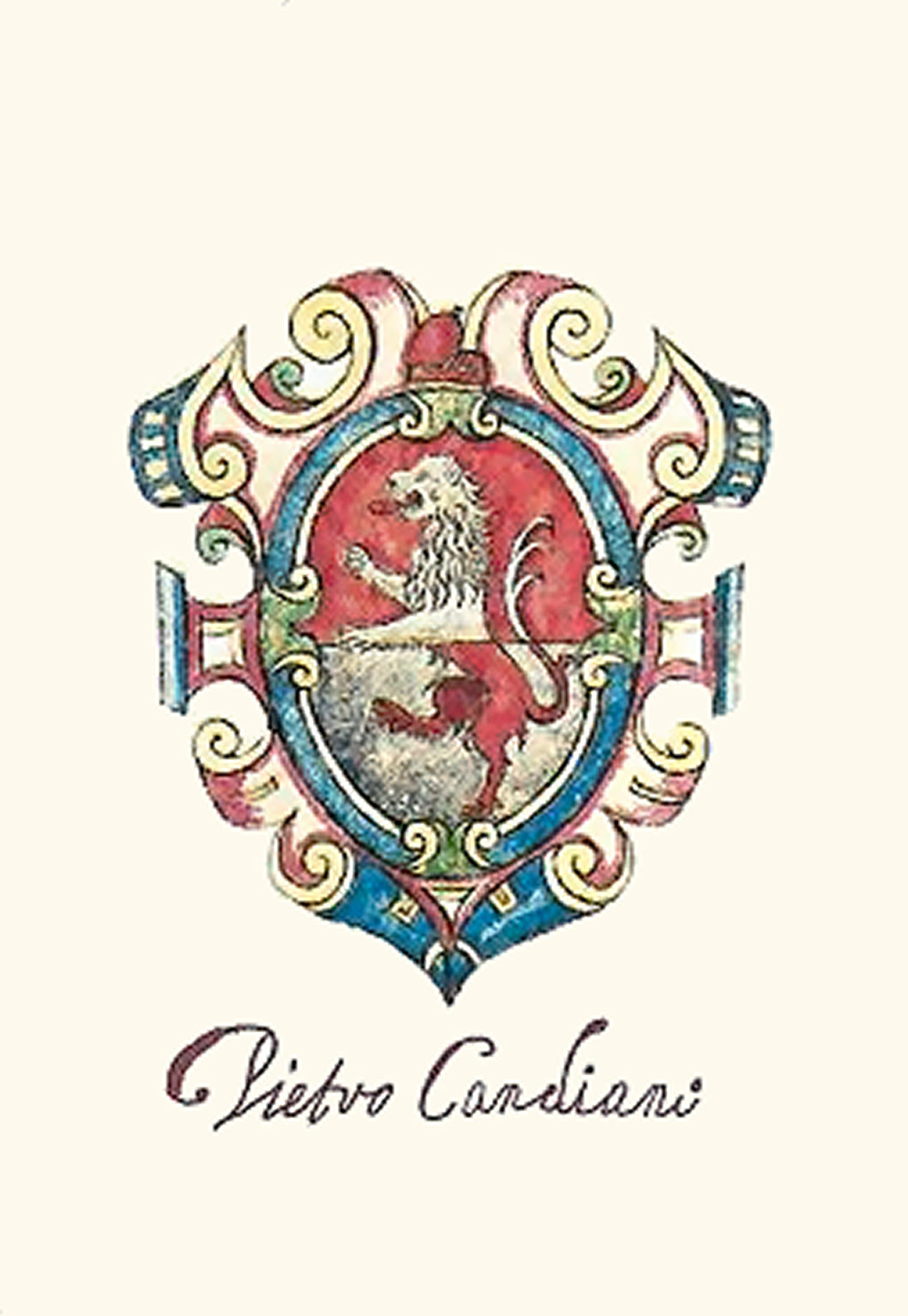
Pietro I Candiano.

The Sanudo family may have originated in Eraclea where Marco Sanudo's ancestors held charges. The family came to the Venetian islands at the beginning of the 9th century after their city was destroyed. The family may have for a time been called Candiano and under that name given doges to the City: Pietro I Candiano (887), Pietro II Candiano (932–939), Pietro III Candiano Canuto (white hair) or Sanuto (wise) (942–959), Pietro IV Candiano (959–976) and Vitale Candiano (978–979). The last Candiani (11th century) may have tried to take power in the Republic and keep it hereditarily in their family. Thus discredited, the name disappeared, and afterwards, only the Sanudo family exists. Note: Candiano derives from Candia, as Crete was called in Venetian, so, "Candiano" means "the Cretan", as "Napolitano" means "the Neapolitan".

Four generations after Pietro IV, a Marco Sanudo is recorded (second half of the 11th century) as a "councilor" and "captain". He might also have been ambassador to Constantinople where he might have negotiated the Byzantine Emperor's recognition of Venice's domination over Dalmatia and Croatia circa 1084-1085. He might then have built numerous friendships and relations in Greece and around the Aegean Sea. He was then nicknamed Costantinopolitani (the "Constantinopolitan"). He had a son, Pietro, of whom we only know that he married a sister of Enrico Dandolo. Pietro and Zabarella had at least three sons: Marco, Bernardo et Lunardo.

Bernardo Sanudo, as a young man, was among the electors of Doge Enrico Dandolo in 1192. Lunardo was one of the officers commanding the Venetian fleet attacking Abydos in 1196. Lunardo, or according to other Venetian chronicles, Bernardo, was Capitan delle Navi (Commander of a portion of the Venetian fleet) for Enrico Dandolo during the conquest of Constantinople in 1204.

Marco Sanudo's date of birth is not known for certain. It is often calculated by deducing his probable age at his probable death. According to the Père Saulger, he would have been 67 in 1220. He might therefore have been born around 1153. He is first mentioned in the medieval chronicles aboard Venetian galleys circa 1176-1177 when 30 galleys from Venice, under the command of Doge Sebastian Ziani clashed against 75 galleys commanded by Otto I, Count of Burgundy, son of Frederick I, Holy Roman Emperor. But the historic existence of this battle is not certain.

Thus, the first certain fact known about Marco Sanudo is that he took part in the Fourth Crusade. He was noted for his courage during the captures of Zara and Constantinople, but with no other details. But, his name is not among those of the officers commanding galleys. It is probable he was aboard a galley commanded by one of his brothers (Bernardo or Lunardo) or by his uncle Enrico Dandolo.

=== Conquest of the Cyclades ===
==== The Cyclades at the beginning of the 13th century ====
After Heraclius, the Byzantine Empire was organized in themes. In the 10th century, a theme of the Aegean Sea (tò théma toû Aiyaíou Pelágous) ruled by an admiral (dhrungarios) was created. It included the Cyclades, Sporades, Chios, Lesbos and Lemnos. But quickly, the central government was no longer capable to control these small and scattered lands. At the beginning of the 13th century, it had given up the very idea altogether. It appears the Cyclades might then have been ruled from Rhodes by a former Byzantine civil servant Leo Gabalas self-styled "Caesar" and "Lord of Rhodes and the Cyclades". But even he was not able to collect the taxes, mainly because of Genoese and Turkish pirates.

At that time, inhabitants left villages by the sea to create new ones in the mountains, such as the villages on the Traghea plateau on Naxos.

==== Competition between Venice and Genoa ====
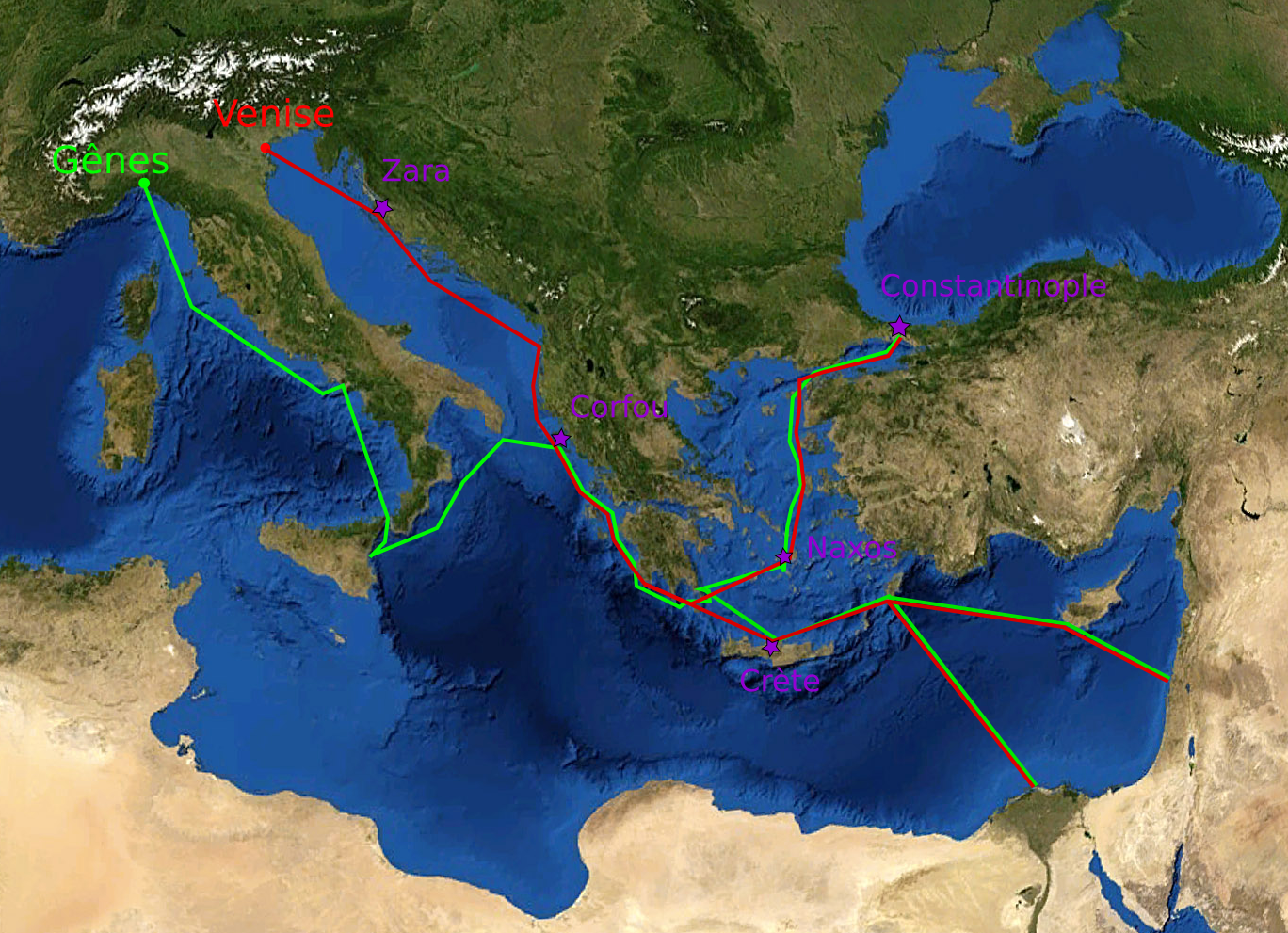
Genoese and Venetian trade routes with the places where Marco Sanudo's presence is proven.

After the 11th century, Italian merchant cities, mainly the Republic of Venice and Republic of Genoa, developed their trade with the Orient, mostly Constantinople and Egypt, the first stages of the silk road. Trade routes of both cities were almost identical. Venetian boats ran alongside the East coast of the Adriatic Sea with stops in Zara, Dyrrachium and Corfu, then around the Peloponnese with Koroni and up the Aegean and Cyclades with stops in Naxos, Euboea and Thessaloniki to Constantinople, or via Crete, Alexandria and Syria to Egypt. The Genoan ships ran alongside the West coast of Italy, crossed the Strait of Messina then the Strait of Otranto to Corfu, round the Peloponnese stopping at Monemvasia, up the Aegean and Cyclades with stops in Chios to Constantinople or via Milos, Naxos and Amorgos to Egypt and Syria. Thus, the cities were competing to control the stopping places.

The competition grew in the 12th century. Venice had secured privileges from Emperor Isaac II Angelos. His successor Alexios III Angelos resented Venetian control of the Byzantine trade. He tried to give more room to Genoa, as well as Pisa (to avoid giving Genoa all the power). Thus, the Genoan marine crushed the very pirates the Republic had created to cripple Venetian (and Byzantine) trade. The Genoan district in Constantinople became larger in 1201. The Pisan influence grew also in Thessaloniki. Venice could not let these go unaddressed. When Alexios Angelos asked the crusaders to help him become Emperor, they could not refuse. A new Emperor, owing his throne to the crusaders and Venice, was what the city needed to regain its commercial power in the Byzantine Empire.

==== The Fourth Crusade ====
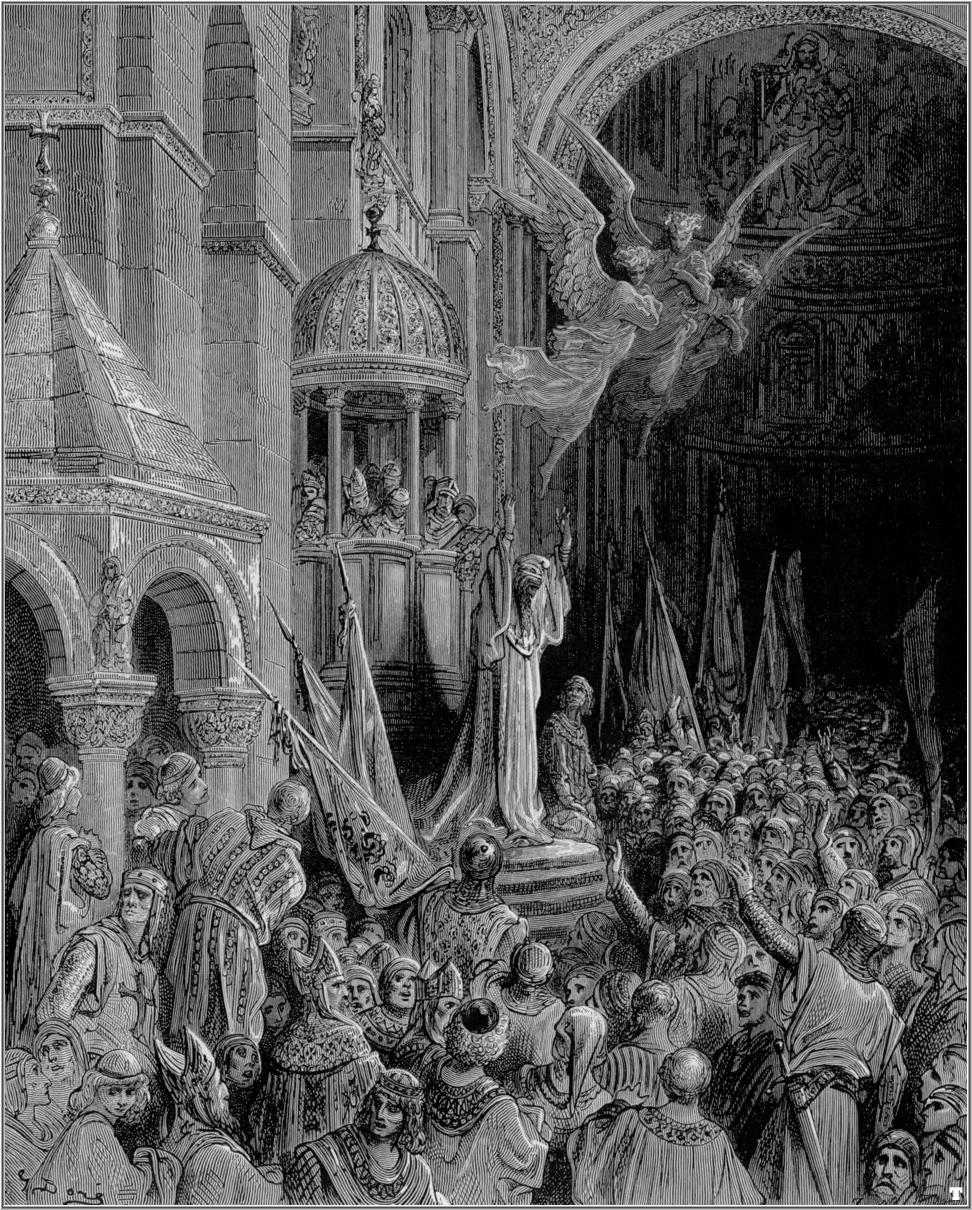
Enrico Dandolo preaching the Crusade

In July 1203, the Crusaders took Constantinople and put Alexios IV Angelos on the throne, as promised. But, the fire in August brought him down. Hostility between the Crusaders and the inhabitants of Constantinople was also growing. Fighting between the Crusaders and the troops of Alexios V Doukas broke out.

Finally, on the 13th of April 1204, the Crusaders, or as they became called "Latins" or "Franks", again took Constantinople and divided the conquered Byzantine Empire. The treaty Partitio terrarum imperii Romaniae was probably drafted during the autumn of 1204 by a commission of 24 people (12 Venetians, 12 non-Venetians). One fourth went to Baldwin VI Count of Hainaut, elected Latin Emperor, three eights went to Venice, and the remaining three eights to the other Crusaders. The Cyclades were not mentioned as such, contrary to the Sporades or the Ionian Islands. Only Andros and Tinos were mentioned: the former was given to Venice and the latter to the Emperor. Historians have tried to identify the others Cycladic islands in the text but nothing is really convincing. Paul Hetherington suggest two simple explanations for the absence of the Cyclades, even the bigger ones such as Naxos, in the text. The treaty was drafted using the Byzantine taxes of 1203 and they were no longer collected on most of the islands. Venice might also have done it deliberately as the Republic was the only one with a real geographic knowledge of the Aegean. Thus, the Republic kept aside essential stopping points on its trade routes.

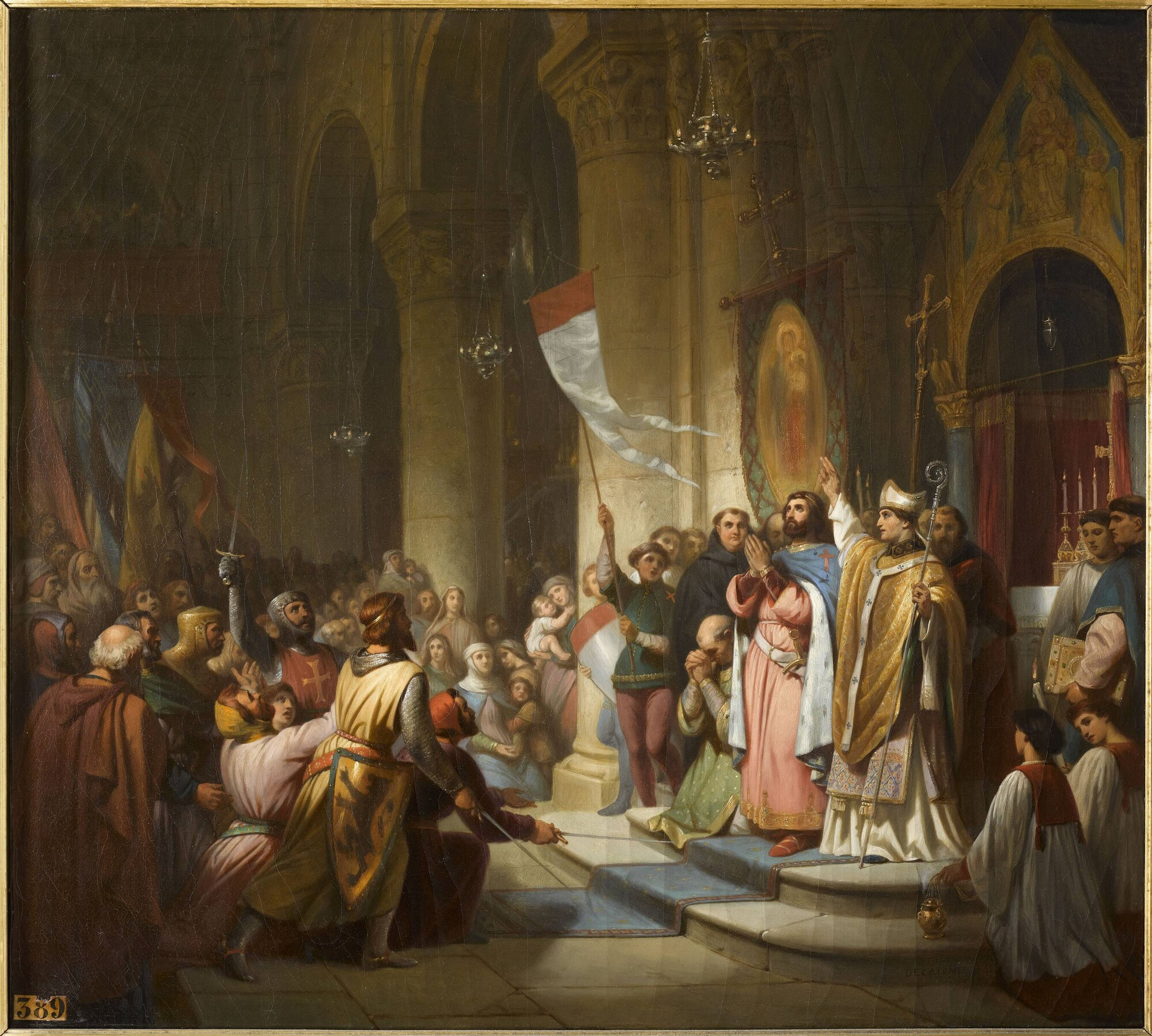
Boniface de Montferrat

In conquered Constantinople, Marco Sanudo became judge at the consular court (giudice del commun) and then took part to the negotiations between the Republic of Venice and Boniface I, Marquess of Montferrat that ended with the purchase of Crete, given to Boniface, by Venice. Boniface de Montferrat was to close to the Genoans for the Venetians. Thus, he was not elected Latin Emperor and was given, as compensation, the Kingdom of Thessalonica and Crete. But Macedonia had not been conquered, when the Latin imperial army began the conquest, Boniface rebelled, considering the Emperor was trying to take his share from him. So, he besieged Adrianople. Enrico Dandolo sent a mission to reason with Boniface. The head of the ambassadors was Geoffroi de Villehardouin and Marco Sanudo was among them. The main objective of the mission was to avoid that Boniface sold Crete to the Republic of Genoa, as he had announced. On the 12th of August 1204, the Treaty of Adrianople between Boniface and Venice was signed. The Republic got the island of Crete and guaranteed to Boniface the possession of the Kingdom of Thessalonica. Some medieval chronicles -after the one by Enrico Dandolo (1360–1362)- say that this Treaty of Adrianople explicitly gave Marco Sanudo lands on Crete. But the original text, preserved, says no such thing.

==== Creation of the Duchy ====
===== Conquest of Naxos =====
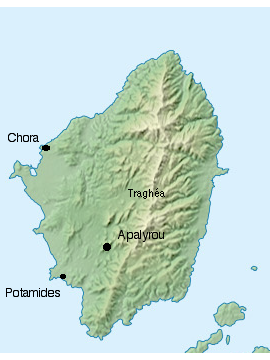
Map of Naxos, with the locations of places concerned by the operations.

The Republic of Venice was afraid that its rival, the Republic of Genoa, would take advantage of the troubled situation in the Eastern Mediterranean to gain ground. Venice could barely buy Crete just before Genoa. Even then, the Ligurian republic threatened its rival with war if it did not abandon the big island. The war was inevitable and started. At the beginning of 1205, the news reached Constantinople that a Genoan fleet had just arrived in the Aegean. Marco Sanudo, with his uncle Enrico Dandolo's and the Latin Emperor's blessings, armed with his own money eight galleys that had been entrusted to him in order to fight the Genoans. All the sailors were Venetians and came on their own accord.

In order to achieve this goal, control of Naxos was essential. Sanudo's fleet landed on the South-West of the island, near Potamides. The local population did not oppose them. The main objective was the Byzantine fortress of Apalyrou, approximately three kilometers inland. It was guarded by Greek and Genoan troops. According to some sources, Sanudo burned his own vessels to motivate his soldiers. The siege lasted for five weeks. The capture of the fortress gave Sanudo control of the whole island.

===== Political confirmations =====
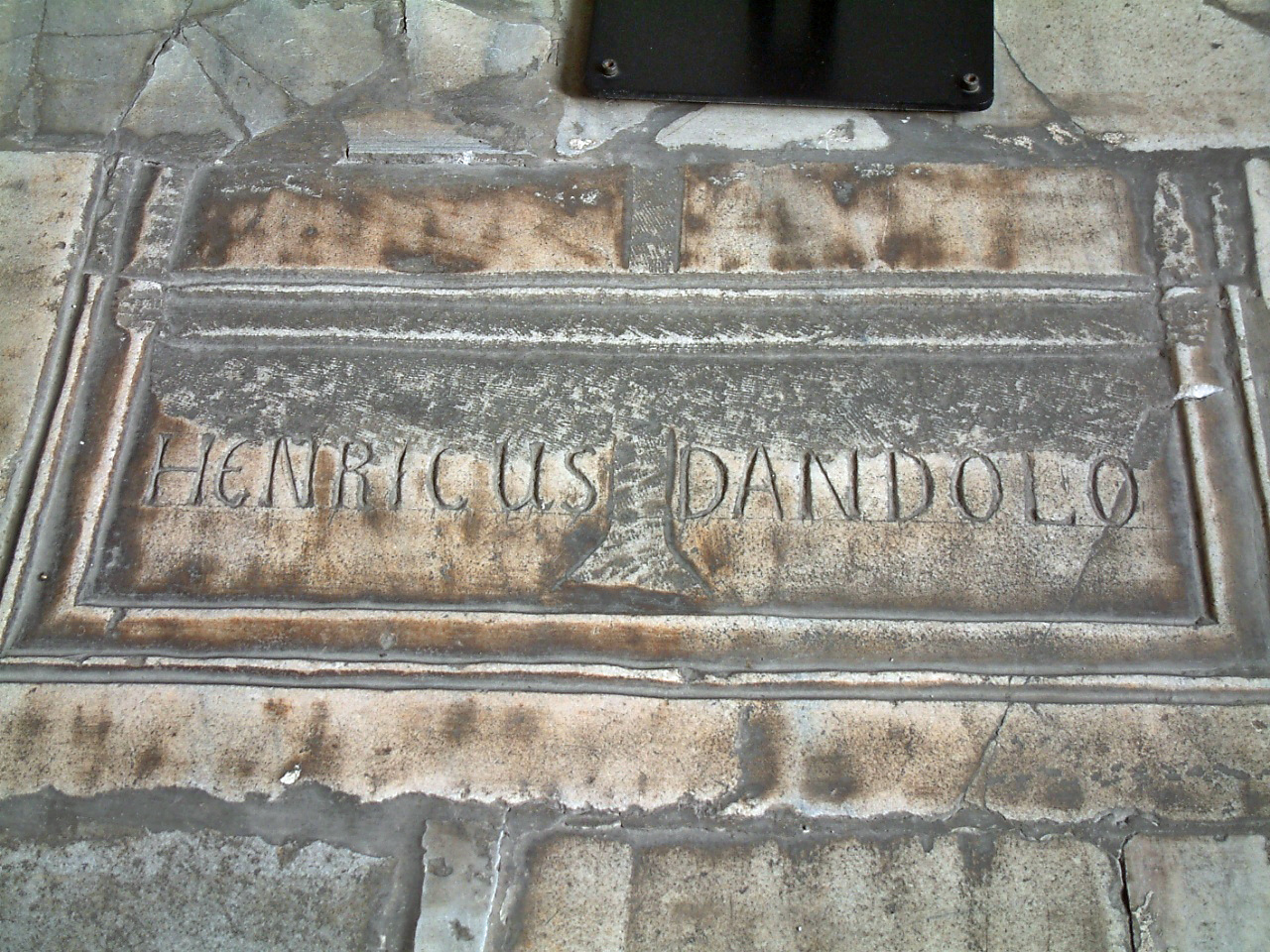
Enrico Dandolo's tomb in the Hagia Sophia.

Marco Sanudo had to have his conquest certified by the Latin Empire's authorities. But, the Emperor Baldwin had died during the Battle of Adrianople (1205) and Marco Sanudo's uncle Enrico Dandolo also died in June. In Constantinople, the podestà and the Council of the Venetians assured him there would be no problem. But, one condition was made: Naxos could only go to a Venetian after Sanudo's death.

In July 1205, Sanudo left for Venice, carrying the news of the death of the Doge, and also to get the confirmation of his conquest. There, he took part to the election of the new Doge, Pietro Ziani. He was then authorized to take, as private property, all Cycladic islands not included in the Partitio Terrarum. In fact, this right was given to all Venetian citizens for all the Byzantine lands not included in the Partitio Terrarum.

Meanwhile, the Genoans had set foot on and fortified Crete and Corfu, threatening the Venetian power. The Republic armed a fleet to oust them. Marco Sanudo took part to the expedition in Crete because the Genoans there were a threat to his island. Enrico Pescatore, working for Genoa, with a fleet comprising eight galleys had set foot in Crete in 1206. The Venetian fleet captured four Genoan galleys in Spinalonga, then patrolled the Cretan seas, boarding all ships. But no attempt was made to land on and recapture the island. At the end of the campaign, the Venetian fleet went back home and Sanudo sailed to Constantinople to get the new Emperor's (Henry of Flanders) confirmation for this conquest and for his new project of conquering the other Cyclades.

===== Conquest of the other islands =====
The authorization given by Venetian and Imperial authorities gave ideas to other adventurers. A new expedition, still privately financed, set sail in 1206-1207. That year, Marco Sanudo controlled all Cyclades with his companions or relatives. His cousin Marino Dandolo (another nephew of Enrico Dandolo) became Lord of Andros. Other relatives, the brothers Andrea and Geremia Ghisi became Lords of Tinos and Mykonos, with fiefs on Kea and Serifos (also in the Sporades). The Pisani shared Kea with the Ghisi and with the Michieli and the Guistiniani. Jaccopo Barozzi (from Bologna) took Santorini. Anafi went to Leonardo Foscolo. Pietro Guistianini and Domenico Michieli each received a quarter of Serifos and a quarter of Kea. Marco Sanudo took a dozen of the bigger islands: Naxos, Paros, Antiparos, Milos, Kimolos, Ios, Amorgos, Siphnos, Sikinos, Syros, Folegandros and Kythnos (where the Castelli and the Gozzadini were his vassals). Some chronicles suggest that he might have already conquered Smyrna at that time.

The conquest seems to have been relatively easy. There are no accounts of battles or fighting. It seems that all the conquerors had to do was to show up in the principal harbour of an island and announce they were taking charge. Historians suggest some explanations. The first is linked to the insecurity caused by the pirates in the Aegean at the time and only the Venetian fleet was strong enough to fight them. Locals did not care that the new lords were private persons and not captains in the service of Venice. Better them than the insecurity. Also, Sanudo did not alienate the Greek ruling class: the archontes. He let them keep their properties, their privileges and their religion. Thus, nothing was to be feared from a local population controlled by the local ruling class.

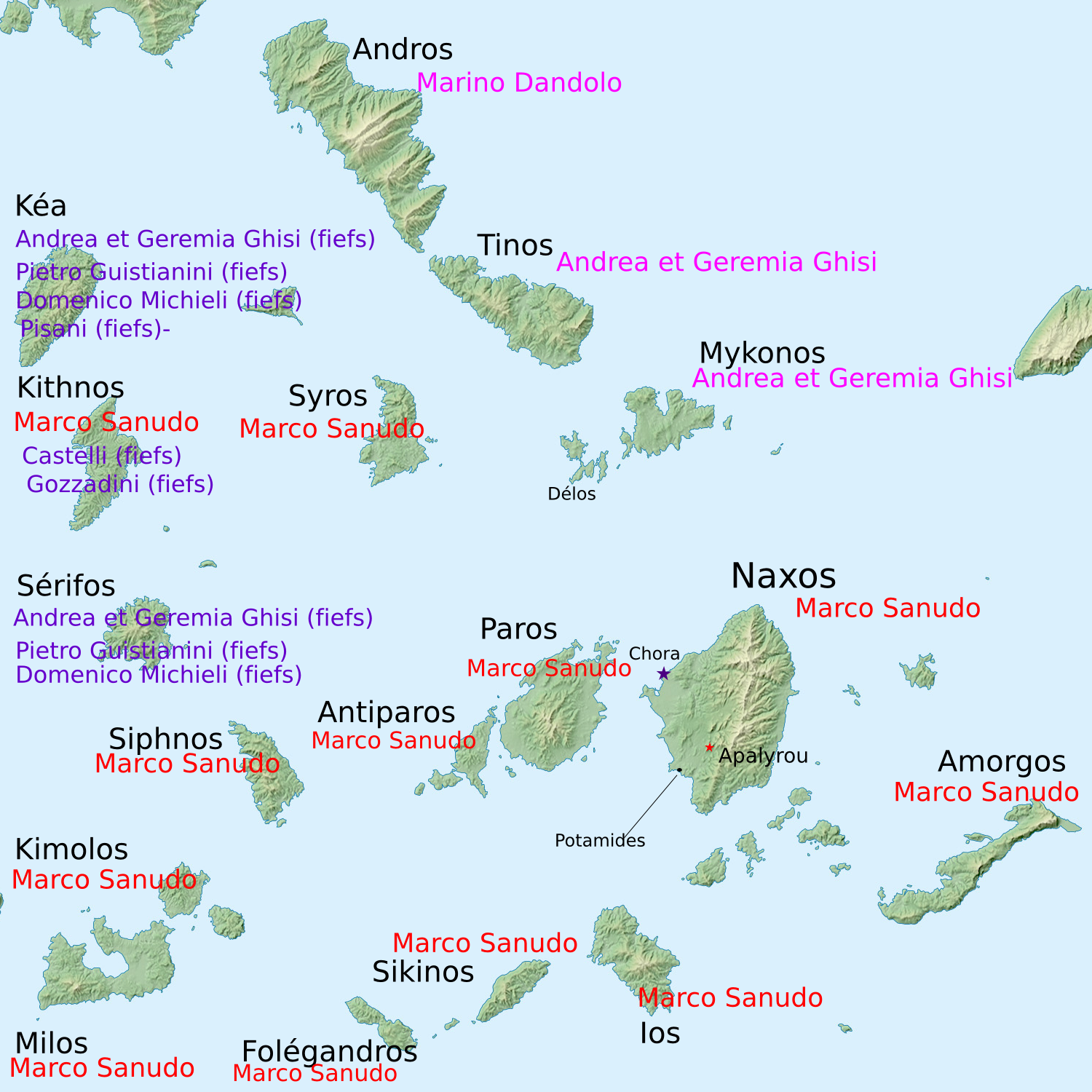
Repartition of the Aegean islands amongst the conquerors.

===== Alternate hypothesis =====
Guillaume Saint-Guillain, in an article published in 2006, after working on the many medieval chronicles and showing they are unreliable, uses documents produced by the contemporaries of Marco Sanudo. Thus, the archbishop of Athens, Michael Choniates, who had taken refuge from the Latin troops on Kea wrote at the end of 1208 or at the beginning of 1209 a letter to the Ecumenical Patriarch of Constantinople in which he refused to take charge of the vacant bishop seat of Paros-Naxos. It seems improbable that he would have fled the Latins in Athens to go into Latin-conquered lands on Naxos. In his poem Théanô, he writes about the Greek resistance to the Latins. Reading that text, we can infer that the island he was living on, Kea, was not conquered at the time he wrote (1212). He suggests in the same poem a failed attempt of conquest of the Cyclades in 1205, but there is no mention of Marco Sanudo. It might then be necessary to suggest a later date for the conquest of the Cyclades by the Venetians.

==== Relations with Greek population ====
Marco Sanudo was the initiator of the two main political lines of all the rulers of the Duchy of Archipelago throughout its existence: independence from the Republic of Venice and good relations with the Greek population of his islands.

===== Feudalism in the Aegean islands =====
In 1210, Marco Sanudo pledged homage to the Latin Emperor Henry who bestowed him the title of Peer of the Byzantine Empire and Duke of the Archipelago. By the term "Archipelago", just meaning the "primary sea", medieval Greeks collectively designated the Cyclades, the Northern & Southern Sporades, and the islands of the northeastern Aegean Sea ("Aigaion Pelagos", Αιγαιον πελαγος). By that homage, Sanudo chose to become the vassal of the Emperor to avoid ending up as a mere governor of the islands in the name of Venice. Thus, he made sure his conquests became his own properties, in exchange of the usual feudal obligations: aid and counsel.

Thus, the feudal system was applied to the Aegean islands. Except for the Ghisi who might have been direct vassals of the Emperor, all the Italians in the Cyclades were Marco Sanudo's vassals, himself vassal of the Emperor. Sanudo rewarded his soldiers and sailors who conquered the islands by conferring knighthood and fiefs in exchange of the usual feudal obligations: aid and counsel. They became known as feudati or feudatori, living from the income of their lands. They became a new social elite alongside the Greek archontés. When the news that yeomen could become knights in Greece reached other lands, a new wave of adventurers arrived from Italy, France or Spain.

Marco Sanudo recognised the rights and deeds to their properties of all the Greek archontés. On Naxos, 56 fiefs (τόποι) are known for that time: half were in Greek hands. It seems there was enough unclaimed lands and lands taken from the ancient Byzantine public domain for Sanudo to give to his new "Franks" vassals without confiscating Greek properties. At the same time, in Crete, Venice confiscated the properties of the Greek archontés and in doing so alienated them for the following centuries during which the Republic had to face numerous rebellions. Marco Sanudo never had any trouble with "his" locals.

The "Frankish" feudal system was simply added to the ancient Byzantine administrative one kept by the new lords: the ancient Byzantine administrative organisation was used for the new feudal taxes and corvées and the Byzantine agricultural techniques were used on the new fiefs. Byzantine law was also used for the local Greek population being for the marriages or the properties. It was the same for the religious organisation: even if the Catholic hierarchy was in power, an Orthodox hierarchy still existed (albeit without a bishop but with a protopappas). And, when a Catholic priest was not available, the mass was said by an Orthodox priest.

Quickly, the two communities became more and more close. The "noblemen", Italians as well as Greeks, were speaking Italian, called by all the Greeks "Frank" and the lower classes spoke a blending of the two languages, an "italohellenic". Thus, they were able to understand each other on some level.

===== Government of the Duchy =====
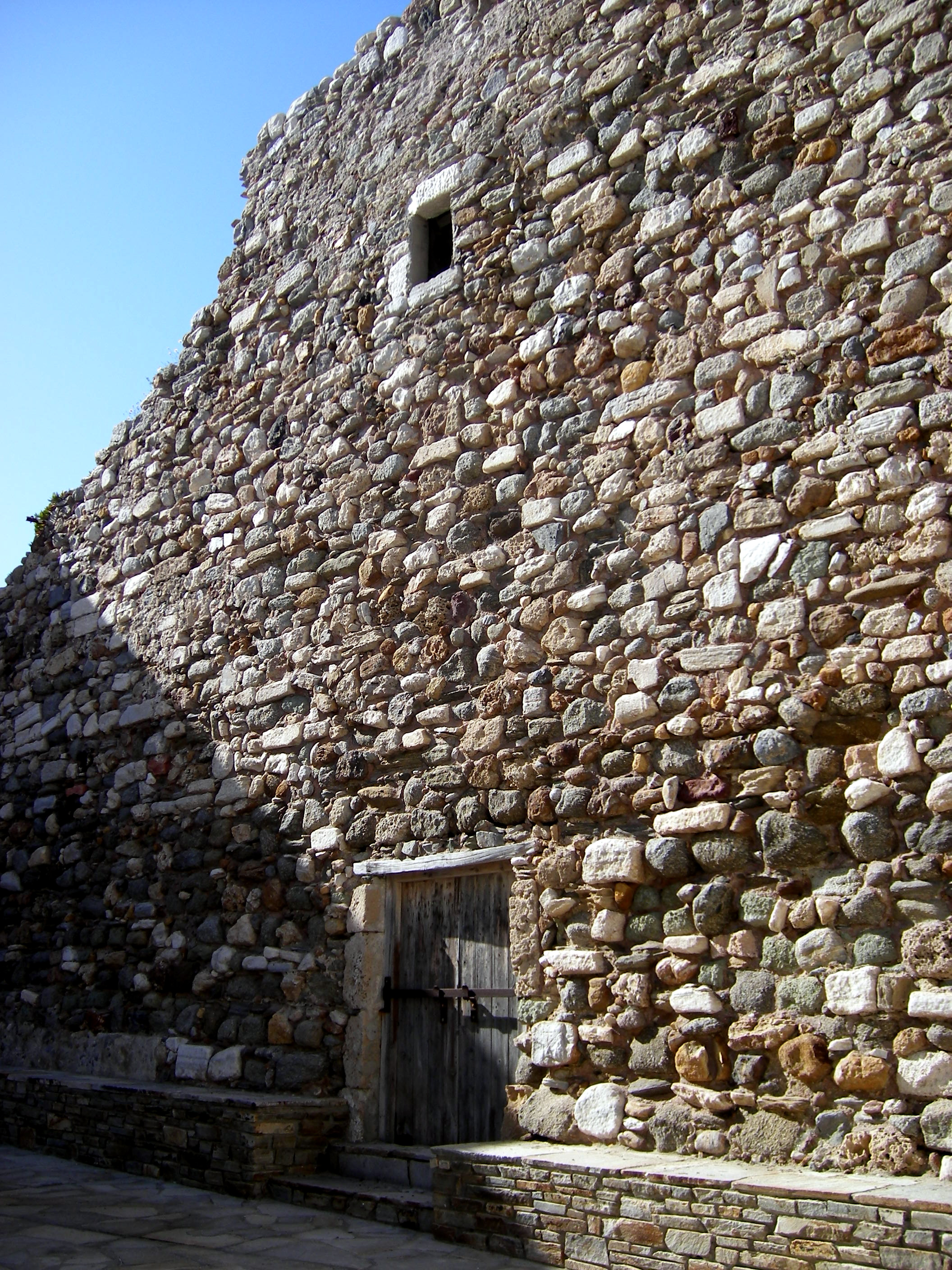
Ruins of Sanudo's keep in the kastro of Naxos.

Sanudo ruled directly over Naxos and Milos and appointed governors on all the other islands. According to Father Saulger, Sanudo created all the institutions of the Duchy, but according to B. J. Slot, there is no real proof of that fact. Marco Sanudo might have been helped by a council (università) inspired by the Venetian institution. Greeks and Latins were members of that council. Sanudo might have instituted the political fonction of vicario, who was supposed to replace him when he was away (which he was repeatedly). There also were a megas kapetanios (in Greek), commander in chief of the troops, a treasurer, a chancellor and a judicial administration. The Duchy also had its own currency: the ducat.

Sanudo changed the face of the island itself by moving the capital (the actual Naxos-town or Chora) from the interior to the seaside, where it used to be during the Antiquity. Its harbor was even better than Potamides. He built at least one pier. Some sources even say he link the mainland with the islet on which the temple is built. Some say that the chapel of Myrtidiotissa on a small islet in the middle of the harbor was built on the medieval pier. On the old acropolis, Sanudo built his kastro, his fortress. It comprised the palace, the exterior walls, a keep, a gothic chapel (since destroyed), the houses of the Latin families and the Catholic cathedral. Greeks built their houses between the harbor and the fortress, in the Bourgou and Neochorio suburbs.

He did the same on Milos, where a new town was built for the Latin families on the seaside: Apanokastro.

===== Catholicism and Orthodoxy =====
Non-Greeks were very few in Sanudo's duchy, around 10% of the population of the "capital island" Naxos, i.e. around 300 people. On the other islands, the proportion was less: not higher than 5%. So, "Latin" and "Greek" ruling classes rapidly mingled. Moreover, the "Latins" were almost exclusively male and Catholic families were not willing to marry their daughters so far away. So, the Latin male lords found wives in Greece.

==== Death and successor ====
Marco died in 1227, two years after Otto de la Roche, the first duke of Athens, departed for France, three years after the Kingdom of Thessalonica collapsed, and a short while before the death of Geoffrey I of Villehardouin, Prince of Achaea. In a very short time, the whole political landscape of Frankish Greece was radically altered.

== Marriage and children ==
According to William Miller, Marco I married an unnamed Laskaraina, a woman of the Laskaris family. Miller identified her as a sister of Constantine Laskaris and Theodore I Laskaris. He based this theory on his own interpretation of Italian chronicles. The "Dictionnaire historique et Généalogique des grandes familles de Grèce, d'Albanie et de Constantinople" (1983) by Mihail-Dimitri Sturdza rejected the theory based on the silence of Byzantine primary sources.

In any case, Marco I had one known son: Angelo Sanudo. Marino Sanuto the Elder is considered a descendant but his exact lineage is not known.

== Sources ==
- J.K. Fotheringham and L.R.F. Williams, Marco Sanudo, conqueror of the Archipelago, Clarendon Press, Oxford, 1915.
- Charles A. Frazee, The Island Princes of Greece: The Dukes of the Archipelago, Adolf M. Hakkert, Amsterdam, 1988. ISBN 90-256-0948-1
- Paul Hetherington, The Greek Islands: Guide to the Byzantine and Medieval Buildings and their Art, Londres, 2001. ISBN 1-899163-68-9
- (in French) Guillaume Saint-Guillain, «Les Conquérants de l'Archipel. L'Empire latin de Constantinople, Venise et les premiers seigneurs des Cyclades.», in Gherardo Ortali, Giorgio Ravegnani et Peter Schreiner (dir.), Quarta Crociata. Venezia - Bisanzio - Impero Latino., Istituto Veneto di Scienze, Lettere ed Arti, Venise, 2006. ISBN 88-88143-74-2
- Setton, Kenneth M. (general editor), A History of the Crusades: Volume II — The Later Crusades, 1189–1311. Robert Lee Wolff and Harry W. Hazard, editors. University of Wisconsin Press: Milwaukee, 1969.
- (in French) J. Slot, Archipelagus Turbatus. Les Cyclades entre colonisation latine et occupation ottomane. c.1500–1718., Publications de l'Institut historique-archéologique néerlandais de Stamboul, 1982. ISBN 90-6258-051-3.

Preceded by new creation	Duke of the Archipelago; 1207–1227	Succeeded by Angelo
