= John I Sanudo =

Italian noble (died 1362)

John I Sanudo (Italian: Giovanni I Sanudo, also known by the diminutive Janulli; died 1362) was the sixth Duke of the Archipelago from 1341 to his death.

He was the brother and successor of Nicholas I and son of William I. His other brother was Marco Sanudo, Lord of Milos.

In 1344, the Aydinid Turks occupied part of Naxos, enslaving 6,000 locals.

John was a supporter of Venice in her war against Genoa, but he was captured and taken captive with his family to Genoa in 1351, where he remained despite Papal entreaties for his release. He was let go in by the terms of the peace treaty of 1355.

With his wife Maria he had one daughter, Florence, who succeeded him.

== Sources ==
- Miller, William (1908). The Latins in the Levant: A History of Frankish Greece (1204–1566). London: John Murray. OCLC 563022439.
- Setton, Kenneth M. (1976). The Papacy and the Levant (1204–1571), Volume I: The Thirteenth and Fourteenth Centuries. Philadelphia: The American Philosophical Society. ISBN 0-87169-114-0.

Preceded by Nicholas I	Duke of the Archipelago; 1341–1362	Succeeded by Florence
