= Marco Sanudo, Lord of Milos =

Lord of Milos

Marco Sanudo (died after 1376) was a lord of the island of Milos in Frankish Greece.

He was a son of William I Sanudo and the brother of Nicholas I Sanudo and John I Sanudo, who were all Dukes of the Archipelago.

He married an unknown wife and had a daughter Fiorenza I Sanudo, Lady of Milos, who married in 1383 Francesco I Crispo, who also became the tenth Duke of the Archipelago.
