= Karystos =

Karystos Κάρυστος
- Municipality
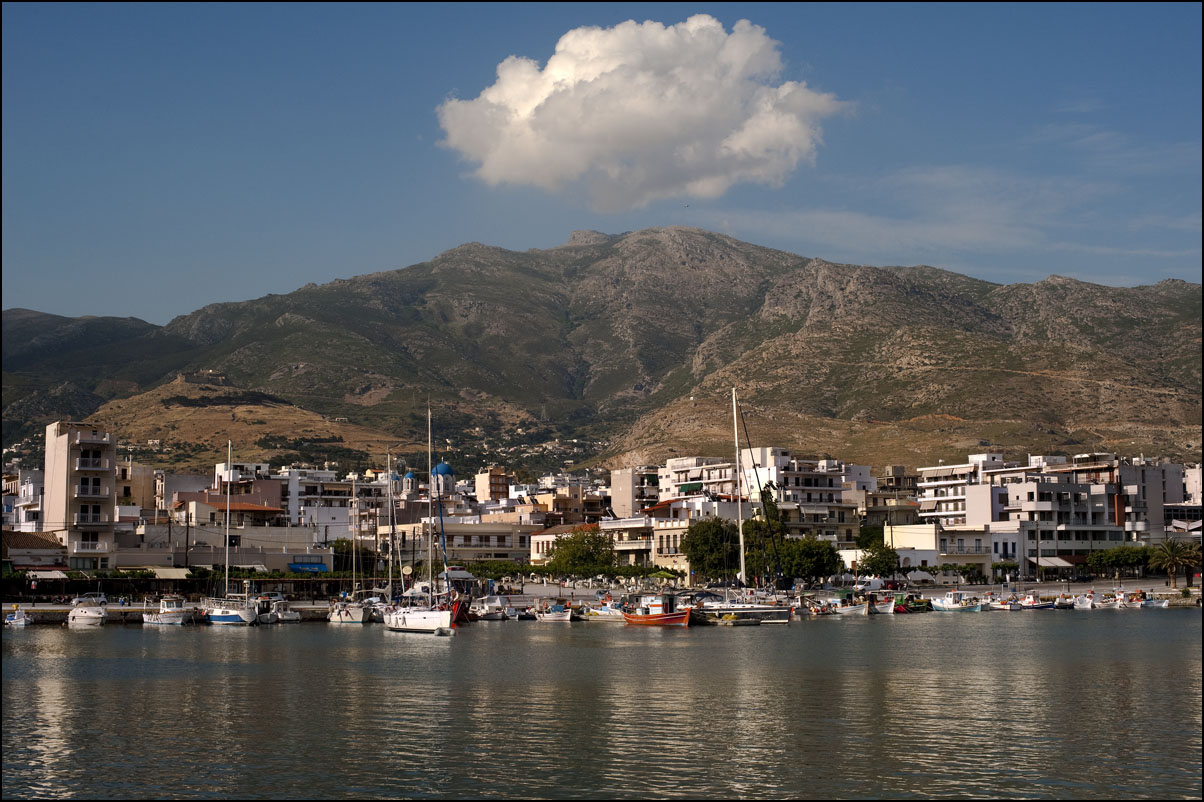
- View of the port.

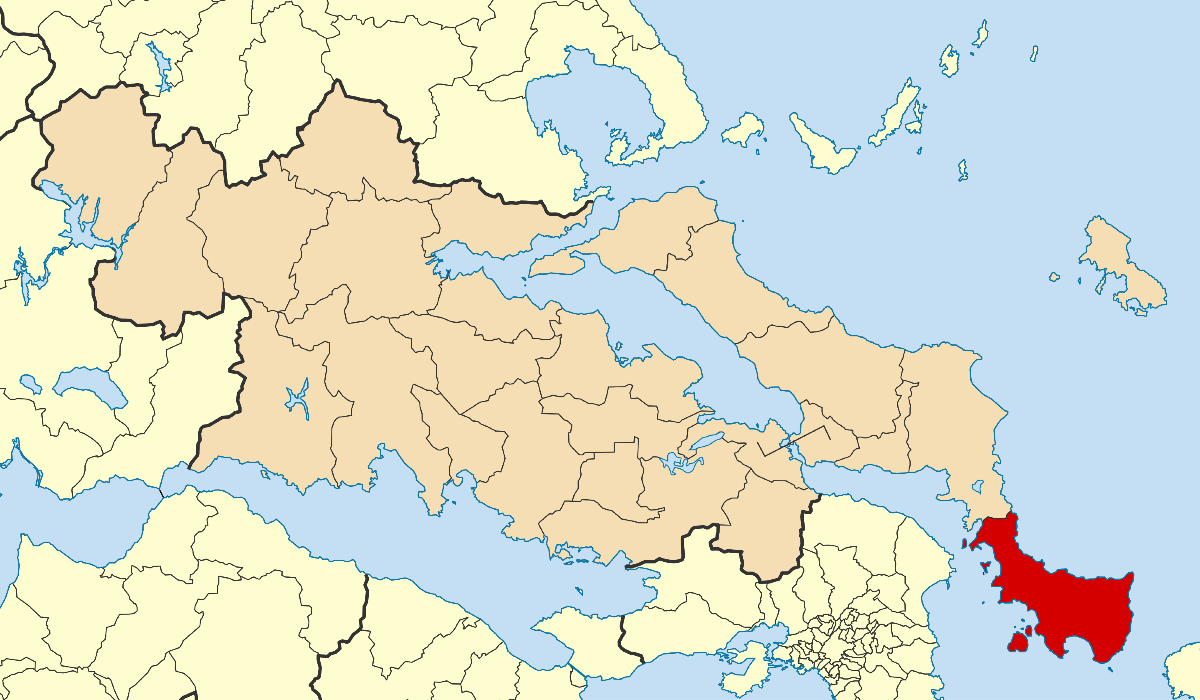

- Location within Greece
- Coordinates: 38°01′N 24°25′Es
- Country: Greece
- Administrative region: Central Greece
- Regional unit: Euboea

Area
  - Municipality: 674.6 km^{2} (260.5 sq mi)
  - Municipal unit: 166.95 km^{2} (64.46 sq mi)
- Lowest elevation: 0 m (0 ft)

Population (2021)
  - Municipality: 11,903
  - Density: 17.64/km^{2} (45.70/sq mi)
  - Municipal unit: 6,963
  - Municipal unit density: 41.71/km^{2} (108.0/sq mi)
  - Community: 5,366
- Time zone: UTC+2 (EET)
  - Summer (DST): UTC+3 (EEST)
- Postal code: 340 01
- Area code: 22x0
- Vehicle registration: XA

Karystos (Greek: Κάρυστος) or Carystus is a small coastal town on the Greek island of Euboea. It has about 5,000 inhabitants (12,000 in the municipality). It lies 129 km south of Chalkis. From Athens it is accessible by ferry via Marmari from the port of Rafina. After the Greek War of Independence, its urban plan was laid out by the renowned Bavarian civil engineer Bierbach, in the middle of the 19th century.

== History ==
Karystos apparently remained inhabited throughout the early Middle Ages. As part of the theme of Hellas, it was also seat of a bishop – a suffragan of Athens – at least since the reign of Leo VI the Wise (r. 886–912). It was among the towns listed in the 1198 chrysobull of Alexios III Angelos, where the Venetians were permitted to establish trade stations. In 1205 it was captured, as with the rest of the island, by James II of Avesnes, and soon it became the seat of the southern third (triarchy) of Euboea under Ravano dalle Carceri.

It is likely that it was at this time, with the construction of the castle of Castel Rosso (some 4 km from the modern town, at the modern village of Myloi) and the rise of piracy, that the town was moved from its coastal location to the inland around Castel Rosso. The town remained an episcopal see under Latin rule, with the Greek bishop remaining in office; in 1222 however it was merged with the Bishopric of Euripos (Chalcis). In 1276/7 it was reconquered by the Byzantines under Licario and held until 1296, when it was recovered by Boniface of Verona. In 1318 it passed into Catalan hands as part of the dowry of Marulla of Verona for her marriage with Alfonso Fadrique. The town was coveted by the Venetians, who already in 1339 offered to purchase it; negotiations dragged on until 1365, however, and only in 1366 did Karystos finally pass into Venetian control when Boniface Fadrique sold the barony to the Republic. After the conquest of Euboea by the Ottoman Empire in 1470, the local Orthodox see was reactivated as part of the Metropolis of Euripos.

== Municipality ==
The municipality Karystos was formed at the 2011 local government reform, as part of the Kallikratis Plan, by the merger of the following 4 former municipalities, that became municipal units:

- Kafireas
- Karystos
- Marmari
- Styra

The municipality has an area of 674.635 km^{2}, the municipal unit 166.950 km^{2}.

== Tourist sites ==
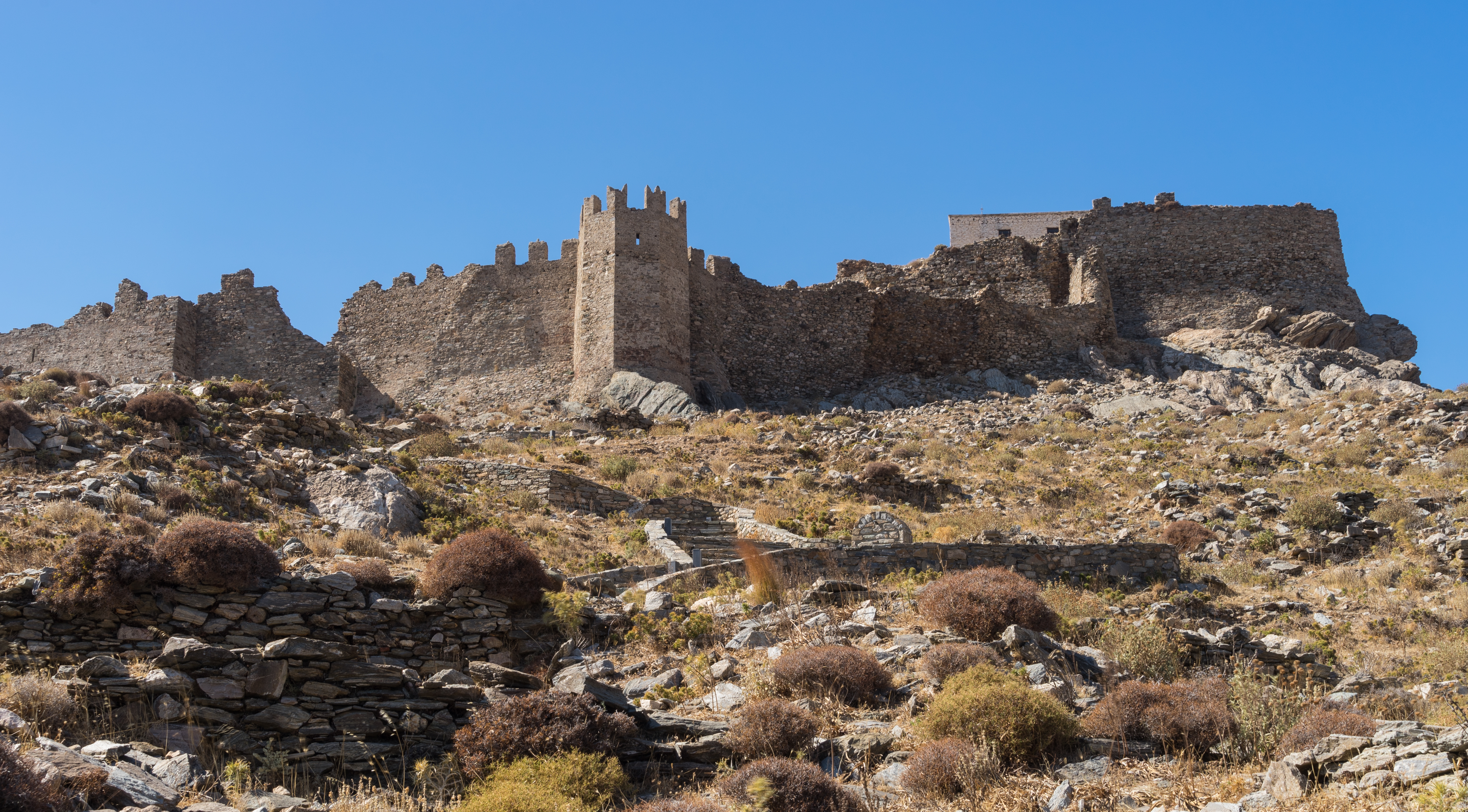
Kokkinokastro (Castelrosso)

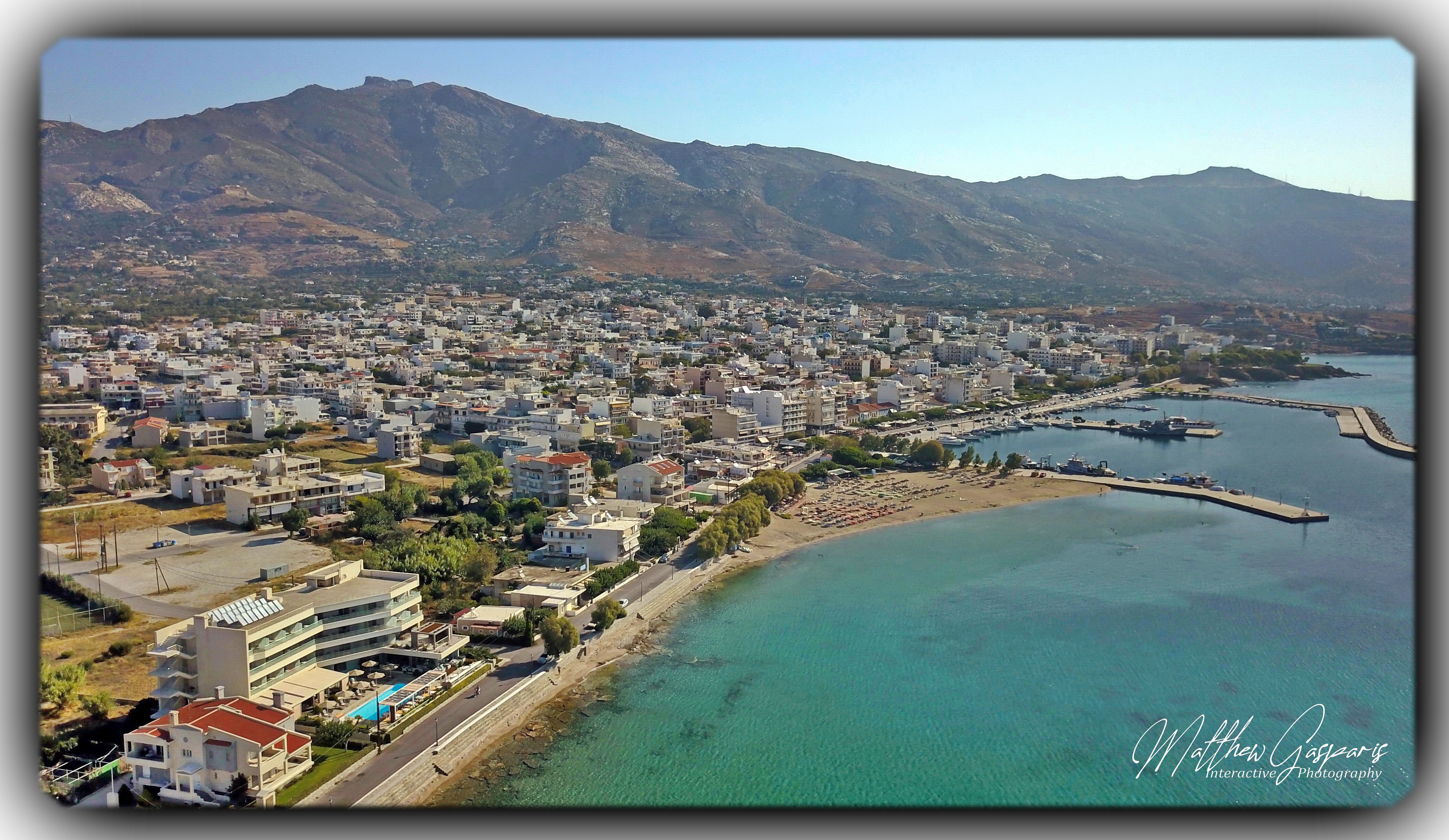
Aerial view of Karystos

- The reconstructed Venetian fortress of Bourtzi, built in the 13th century on the eastern beach of the town.
- The ruins of the Venetian castle named Castello Rosso built in 1030 and ancient marble quarries, both at the nearby hamlet of Myloi.
- The town hall, built at the end of the 19th century.
- A small museum hosted by the Yokaleion Cultural Centre, featuring collections of Hellenistic and Roman era sculptures and pottery.
- The Orthodox monasteries of Taxiarches, St. George and St. Mavra.
- The Cave of Agia Triada is located at the foot of the Mount Ochi, 50 m from the Church of Agia Triada, and about 3 km from the village of Kalyvia. It is the largest cave in southern Euboea. The human presence in the cave is dated to the early Neolithic period (from the oldest to date in the area), the Late Neolithic II and the early Bronze Age, while sporadic evidence exists for its use in historic times. First contemporary report on the cave is found in texts about the wider region of Karystos, by Karakostas and Gounaropoulos, in the first half of the 19th century. More precise information can be found in the book ‘Karystos’(1954) by C. Papamanolis, which contains information from the missions of 1932 and 1934.
- The mountain area of Mt. Ochi.
- Cape Cavo D'Oro.
- The Dragon house, the most famous and well preserved in South Euboea.

== Notable people ==
- Diocles of Carystus, 4th-century BC physician
- Antigonus of Carystus, 3rd-century BC writer
- Apollodorus of Carystus, 3rd-century BC comedy writer
- Glaucus of Carystus, 6th-century BC boxer
- Othon de Cicon, 13th-century Frankish lord of Karystos
- Licario, 13th-century admiral of the Byzantine empire

== Sources ==
- Koder, Johannes; Hild, Friedrich (1976). Tabula Imperii Byzantini, Band 1: Hellas und Thessalia (in German). Vienna: Verlag der Österreichischen Akademie der Wissenschaften. ISBN 978-3-7001-0182-6.
- Miller, William (1908). The Latins in the Levant: A History of Frankish Greece (1204–1566). London: John Murray.
