= Florence Sanudo =

Italian noble (died 1371)

Florence Sanudo or Fiorenza (died 1371), was Duchess of the Archipelago in 1362–1371, in co-regency with her second spouse.

== Life ==
Florence Sanudo was the daughter and successor of John I, Duke of the Archipelago.

She first married Giovanni dalle Carceri, Lord of Euboea (d. 1358). She succeeded her father in 1362 as a young widow with only one son, and attracted many suitors, for which reason W. Miller labelled her "the Penelope of Frankish Greece". Her marriage was politically very crucial and the subject of much diplomatic activity.

She was given a proposal from the Vignoso, Genoese Lord of Chios. This marriage was vetoed by the Republic of Venice, who regarded it of the utmost importance that she married a Venetian so as to prevent any potential anti-Venetian establishment in the Duchy. Florence was openly warned by Venice not to bestow her hand to any enemy of Venice, when there were so many Venetian consorts available. Her mother assured the Venetians that her daughter had not desire to marry an enemy of Venice. Soon, however, Florence was given a proposal by Nerio I Acciajuoli, the future Duke of Athens and showed herself willing to accept it. Venice protested, but the groom was supported by the Kingdom of Naples through Robert of Taranto, who, as Prince of Achaia, was the suzerain of Athens. Naples warned Venice from interfering in the marriage, but Venice replied that Florence was a daughter of the republic and that her duchy owed its existence to the diplomacy and fleet of Venice, and ordered its fleet in Greece to prevent the marriage and the landing of Nerio in the Cyclades.

Duchess Florence was kidnapped and brought via a Venetian galley to Venetian Crete. There, she was treated with respect due to her rank but informed that she would never be allowed to leave unless she agreed to marry the Venetian candidate, her cousin Nicholas Spezzabanda. Reportedly, she was not displeased with the person of Nicholas, who was described as attractive, but whatever the reason, she did consent to marry him, and the wedding took place in 1364.

The Venetians entitled her spouse eight Consort Duke, and Nicholas II were described as an able co-regent and loyal to Venice.

Florence died in 1371 and was succeeded by her son by Giovanni, Nicholas III dalle Carceri, under the regency of his stepfather during his minority.

== Issue ==
By Giovanni dalle Carceri:

1. Nicholas III dalle Carceri

By Nicholas Spezzabanda:

1. Maria Sanudo, Lady of Andros
2. Elisabetta Sanudo da Candia, Lady of Candia

== Sources ==
- Miller, William (1908). The Latins in the Levant: A History of Frankish Greece (1204–1566). London: John Murray. OCLC 563022439.

Preceded by John I	Duchess of the Archipelago; 1362–1371	Succeeded by Nicholas III
