= Battle of Picotin =

1316 battle between Achaea and Majorca

- Map of the Peloponnese with its principal locations during the late Middle Ages
Date	22 February 1316
Location	Picotin, near ancient Elis
Result	Kingdom of Majorca victory

Belligerents
Kingdom of Majorca	Principality of Achaea

Commanders and leaders
Ferdinand of Majorca	Unknown

Strength
500 cavalry, 500 infantry	700 Burgundian knights, native Achaean feudal levies

Casualties and losses
Unknown	500 Burgundians, 700 Achaeans dead

The Battle of Picotin was fought on 22 February 1316 between the Catalan forces of the infante Ferdinand of Majorca, claimant to the Principality of Achaea, and the forces loyal to Princess Matilda of Hainaut, comprising native levies from the barons loyal to the Princess as well as Burgundian knights. The battle ended in a crushing victory for Ferdinand, but he was later engaged and killed by the troops of Matilda's husband, Louis of Burgundy, at the Battle of Manolada.

== Background ==
In 1278, when Prince William II of Villehardouin died without male offspring, per the Treaty of Viterbo, the princely title of Achaea in southern Greece passed to the Angevin King of Sicily, Charles of Anjou. In 1289, the Angevins had passed control of the principality to William's eldest daughter, Isabella of Villehardouin, and her descendants, but retained their suzerainty over Achaea. After Isabella's death in 1312, her younger sister Margaret of Villehardouin claimed the principality, or at least part of it, as her inheritance, but her claims were rejected by the Angevins, who supported the succession of Isabella's daughter, Matilda of Hainaut.

In order to gain support for her claims, Margaret visited Sicily in February 1314 to wed her only daughter, Isabella of Sabran to the Infante Ferdinand of Majorca, who, as a landless prince, was eager to claim the princely title of Achaea. The wedding was celebrated at Messina in February 1314 in great pomp. Margaret passed her titles and claims to them, and returned to Achaea. There she was confronted with the hostility of the Achaean barons to her act, and imprisoned by the Angevin bailli Nicholas le Maure at the castle of Chlemoutsi, where she died in March 1315. Soon after, Ferdinand invaded Achaea in a bid to claim the Principality from Matilda and her husband, Louis of Burgundy, who were still absent from Greece. Landing in late June, by August Ferdinand had taken over the town of Glarentza and the principality's heartland, the rich plains of Elis.

== Battle and aftermath ==
The subsequent events are described in the Aragonese version of the Chronicle of the Morea. In late 1315, Princess Matilda arrived in Achaea, landing at Port-de-Jonc with 1,000 Burgundian soldiers, as her husband's vanguard. Nicholas le Maure and several of the Achaean barons, who had recognized Ferdinand's rule, now came over to seek her pardon. Ferdinand reacted by capturing the castle of Chalandritsa, whose baron had defected to Matilda, and garrisoning it with 1,500 men. He then proceeded to lay siege to Patras, which was successfully defended by its archbishop, Renier.

In early 1316 the Princess appointed a commander, who led the Burgundians and the feudal levies of the Achaean barons loyal to her north. The loyalist army encamped at a village called Picotin, near Palaiopolis (ancient Elis), and on 22 February Ferdinand marched out from Andravida to meet them with 500 cavalry and 500 Almogavar infantry. According to the Chronicle, to speed their progress, Ferdinand ordered his riders to take each one of the infantry on their horses, himself giving the example. When he saw the Catalans approaching, the Princess' captain arranged the 700 Burgundians in the front line and charged the advancing Catalan army, leaving the Achaean troops back in the second line. The Burgundians unhorsed 300 Catalans on the first clash, but the dismounted riders, together with the Almogavars, used their lances to kill the Burgundian knights' horses to terrible effect: within less than two hours, according to the Chronicle, the Catalans killed 500 Burgundians and 700 native troops, including Gilbert Sanudo, brother of the Duke of Naxos, and many other nobles. The Catalans reportedly counted 700 dead horses on the battlefield. The remnants of the Princess' army withdrew in haste, pursued by the Catalans for a while, before they turned back to loot the abandoned Achaean camp.

At about the same time as the battle at Picotin, an attempt by Renier of Patras and his men to capture Chalandritsa, while Ferdinand was pre-occupied with the princely army, failed. The defeated Achaean barons retreated once more to the south, into Messenia. There they were soon joined by Louis and his main force, who had landed in Greece at about the time of the battle. Reinforced by Byzantine troops from Mystras, Louis enjoyed a large numerical superiority, and at the Battle of Manolada on 5 July 1316, Ferdinand was defeated and killed. The Catalans abandoned the fortresses they controlled and left Achaea a few months later.

== Sources ==
- Bon, Antoine (1969). La Morée franque. Recherches historiques, topographiques et archéologiques sur la principauté d'Achaïe [The Frankish Morea. Historical, Topographic and Archaeological Studies on the Principality of Achaea] (in French). Paris: De Boccard.
- Morel-Fatio, Alfred, ed. (1885). Libro de los fechos et conquistas del principado de la Morea compilado por comandamiento de Don Fray Johan Ferrandez de Heredia, maestro del Hospital de S. Johan de Jerusalem - Chronique de Morée aux XIIe et XIVe siècles, publiée & traduite pour la première fois pour la Société de l'Orient Latin par Alfred Morel-Fatio. Geneva: Jules-Guillaume Fick.
- Topping, Peter (1975). "The Morea, 1311–1364". In Setton, Kenneth M.; Hazard, Harry W. (eds.). A History of the Crusades, Volume III: The Fourteenth and Fifteenth Centuries. Vol. 3. Madison and London: University of Wisconsin Press. pp. 104–140. ISBN 0-299-06670-3.
