= Nicholas III of Saint-Omer =

Nicholas of Saint-Omer

Lord of one half of Thebes
- Tenure: Before 1299 – 1311
- Predecessor: Otho of Saint-Omer
- Successor: Catalan conquest

Lord of one third of Akova
- Tenure: Before 1290 – 1314
- Predecessor: John of Saint-Omer

Marshal of Achaea
- Tenure: Before 1290 – 1314
- Predecessor: John of Saint-Omer
- Died: 30 January 1314
- Spouse: Guglielma Orsini
- Dynasty: Saint-Omer
- Father: John of Saint-Omer
- Mother: Margaret of Passavant
- Religion: Roman Catholic

Nicholas III of Saint-Omer (died 30 January 1314) was one of the most powerful and influential lords of Frankish Greece. He was hereditary Marshal of the Principality of Achaea, lord of one third of Akova and of one half of Thebes. He also served on three occasions as bailli of the Principality of Achaea (1300–1302, 1304–1307, c. 1311–1314).

== Life ==
Nicholas was the son of John of Saint-Omer, Marshal of the Principality of Achaea, and Margaret of Passavant, and the grandson of Bela of Saint-Omer, who first received one half of Thebes for his domain from the Duke of Athens (who held the other half). From his father, who died before 1290, Nicholas inherited a third of the Barony of Akova (originally the inheritance of his mother), as well as extensive lands in Messenia and the post of Marshal of Achaea.

Map of the Greek and Latin states in southern Greece c. 1278

He fought in the campaigns of 1291/92 against the Byzantine Greeks of the Despotate of Epirus, and inherited rule over one half of Thebes from his uncle Otho of Saint-Omer at his death, sometime before 1299. He was consequently a man of influence in the affairs of Frankish Greece. It was on his advice that Guy II de la Roche, the young Duke of Athens, was wed to the daughter and heiress of Princess Isabella of Villehardouin, Matilda of Hainaut, in an effort to improve the relations of the two most powerful, and often rival, Frankish states of Greece, and establish an alliance between them. In 1300–1302, during Isabella's absence in Italy, Nicholas served as the bailli (viceroy) of Achaea's suzerain, King Charles II of Naples.

In 1301, Princess Isabella married her third husband, Philip of Savoy. The new Prince quickly made himself unpopular in Achaea by his arrogance, despotic manners, and disregard for the principality's feudal customs. When Philip, immediately after his arrival, arrested the chancellor Benjamin of Kalamata, Nicholas confronted the new prince at Glarentza and vehemently protested this act; violence was averted through the intervention of Isabella and Philip's counsellors. In 1302/3 Nicholas campaigned alongside his liege-lord Guy II of Athens in Thessaly, to aid the local ruler John II Doukas in repelling an Epirote invasion. The Epirotes were pushed back, and the Frankish army raided as far as the Byzantine province around Thessalonica, from where they withdrew at the request of the Empress Yolande of Montferrat.

In 1303/4, Charles II of Naples launched an attack on Epirus, as the Epirote regent, Anna Kantakouzene, refused to re-affirm Epirote vassalage to Naples. An Achaean contingent, under Philip of Savoy and with Nicholas present, joined the Neapolitan forces. The combined force laid siege to the Epirote capital, Arta, but suffered losses for little gain and withdrew with the onset of autumn. Charles was determined to renew his attack the next spring, but Anna of Epirus managed to sabotage his plans by bribing Philip of Savoy to stay at home. As an excuse for his refusal to campaign, Nicholas counselled Philip to call a parliament at Corinth. When Philip left later that year for Italy, to settle his claim to Piedmont, Nicholas was appointed bailli in his absence. Nicholas remained in the post until 1307, when the new Prince, Philip I of Taranto, named Guy II of Athens instead.

Nicholas also emerged as the patron of Princess Isabella's younger sister, Margaret of Villehardouin, who had several enemies on account of her own claims on the Principality. In this role, in 1304 he opposed Philip of Savoy and helped Margaret secure part of the inheritance of her husband, the count of Cephalonia Richard Orsini, from her stepson, John I. According to the Aragonese version of the Chronicle of the Morea, he also served once more as bailli after Gilles de la Plainche (attested in office in 1311), possibly until his death, when he was succeeded by Nicholas le Maure. It is possible, however, that this reference is a confusion with his previous two tenures.

Nicholas was married, sometime after 1294, to Guglielma Orsini, daughter of Richard Orsini and widow of the Grand Constable John Chauderon, but the marriage remained childless. When Nicholas died on 30 January 1314, it signalled the end of the Saint-Omer line.

== Sources ==
- Bon, Antoine (1969). La Morée franque. Recherches historiques, topographiques et archéologiques sur la principauté d'Achaïe [The Frankish Morea. Historical, Topographic and Archaeological Studies on the Principality of Achaea] (in French). Paris: De Boccard.
- Longnon, Jean (1969) [1962]. "The Frankish States in Greece, 1204–1311". In Setton, Kenneth M.; Wolff, Robert Lee; Hazard, Harry W. (eds.). A History of the Crusades, Volume II: The Later Crusades, 1189–1311. Vol. 2 (Second ed.). Madison, Milwaukee, and London: University of Wisconsin Press. pp. 234–275. ISBN 0-299-04844-6.
- Perra, Foteini (2011). Οικογένεια Σεντ Ομέρ. Encyclopedia of the Hellenic World, Boeotia (in Greek). Foundation of the Hellenic World.
- Trapp, Erich; Beyer, Hans-Veit; Kaplaneres, Sokrates; Leontiadis, Ioannis (1990). "24700. Σαῖντ ̓Ομέρ, Νικόλας IIΙ. ντὲ". Prosopographisches Lexikon der Palaiologenzeit (in German). Vol. 10. Vienna: Verlag der Österreichischen Akademie der Wissenschaften. ISBN 3-7001-3003-1.

Preceded by Otho of Saint-Omer	Lord of one half of Thebes before 1299 – 1311	Catalan conquest
Preceded by John of Saint-Omer	Lord of one third of Akova before 1290 – 1314	Extinction of the Saint-Omer line
Preceded by Richard Orsini	Angevin bailli in the Principality of Achaea; 1300–1302	Vacant Direct administration by Prince Philip of Savoy Title next held by himself
Vacant Direct administration by Prince Philip of Savoy Title last held by himself	Angevin bailli in the Principality of Achaea; 1305–1307	Succeeded by Guy II de la Roche
Preceded by Gilles de la Plainche	Angevin bailli in the Principality of Achaea after 1311–1314	Succeeded by Nicholas le Maure
