= Benjamin of Kalamata =

13th-14th century chancellor of the Principality of Achaea

Benjamin of Kalamata was the longtime chancellor of the Principality of Achaea in Frankish Greece from 1297 until at least 1324.

Benjamin first appears in 1297, when, following the death of the Prince of Achaea, Florent of Hainaut, his widow, Princess Isabella of Villehardouin withdrew to the castle of Kalamata. To govern the Principality, Isabella appointed Richard Orsini to rule in her stead as bailli and named Benjamin, who had been the protovestiarios of the Principality—an office equivalent to a Western chamberlain and charged with keeping the list of fief-holders—as the new chancellor. Benjamin was succeeded as protovestiarios by a Greek named Vasilopoulos. In 1300, Richard Orsini was replaced as bailli by Nicholas III of Saint Omer, on Benjamin's advice. Hereditary marshal of the Principality and one of its most powerful barons, Nicholas was also Benjamin's close friend. This began a period of rivalry between Richard and Benjamin.

In 1301, Princess Isabella married her third husband, Philip of Savoy. The new Prince quickly made himself unpopular in Achaea by his arrogance, despotic manners, and disregard for the principality's feudal customs. Immediately after his arrival, acting on the advice of a partisan of Richard Orsini, Philip arrested Benjamin on charge of treason and imprisoned him at Andravida. Nicholas of Saint Omer immediately confronted the new prince at Glarentza and vehemently protested this act; violence was averted through the intervention of Isabella and Philip's counsellors. Benjamin was released after a payment of 20,000 hyperpyra, and received in exchange possession of a fief at Perachora near Corinth. Despite this inauspicious start, Benjamin nevertheless quickly managed to win Philip's trust and esteem; on his advice, the Prince now forced Richard Orsini to purchase a fief for the same sum of 20,000 hyperpyra, which, given his own death and the death of his sole heir soon after, reverted to the Achaean fisc.

In 1304 he was one of the witnesses at the marriage of Richard Orsini's son and heir, John I Orsini, and Maria Komnene Doukaina. In December 1320, Benjamin became a citizen of the Republic of Venice, and in June of the next year, was among the Achaean magnates who sent a letter to the Doge of Venice offering to hand over the Principality to him. He still occupied the post of chancellor In June when a letter from Prince Philip of Taranto was addressed to the Achaean nobility and magnates.

== Sources ==
- Bon, Antoine (1969). La Morée franque. Recherches historiques, topographiques et archéologiques sur la principauté d'Achaïe [The Frankish Morea. Historical, Topographic and Archaeological Studies on the Principality of Achaea] (in French). Paris: De Boccard. OCLC 869621129.
- Longnon, Jean (1969) [1962]. "The Frankish States in Greece, 1204–1311". In Setton, Kenneth M.; Wolff, Robert Lee; Hazard, Harry W. (eds.). A History of the Crusades, Volume II: The Later Crusades, 1189–1311 (Second ed.). Madison, Milwaukee, and London: University of Wisconsin Press. pp. 234–275. ISBN 0-299-04844-6.
