= 1316 =

1316 in various calendars
- Gregorian calendar: 1316; MCCCXVI
- Ab urbe condita: 2069
- Armenian calendar: 765; ԹՎ ՉԿԵ
- Assyrian calendar: 6066
- Balinese saka calendar: 1237–1238
- Bengali calendar: 722–723
- Berber calendar: 2266
- English Regnal year: 9 Edw. 2 – 10 Edw. 2
- Buddhist calendar: 1860
- Burmese calendar: 678
- Byzantine calendar: 6824–6825
- Chinese calendar: 乙卯年 (Wood Rabbit); 4013 or 3806 — to — 丙辰年 (Fire Dragon); 4014 or 3807
- Coptic calendar: 1032–1033
- Discordian calendar: 2482
- Ethiopian calendar: 1308–1309
- Hebrew calendar: 5076–5077
- Hindu calendars
- Vikram Samvat: 1372–1373
- Shaka Samvat: 1237–1238
- Kali Yuga: 4416–4417
- Holocene calendar: 11316
- Igbo calendar: 316–317
- Iranian calendar: 694–695
- Islamic calendar: 715–716
- Japanese calendar: Shōwa 5 (正和５年)
- Javanese calendar: 1227–1228
- Julian calendar: 1316; MCCCXVI
- Korean calendar: 3649
- Minguo calendar: 596 before ROC 民前596年
- Nanakshahi calendar: −152
- Thai solar calendar: 1858–1859
- Tibetan calendar: ཤིང་མོ་ཡོས་ལོ་ (female Wood-Hare); 1442 or 1061 or 289 — to — མེ་ཕོ་འབྲུག་ལོ་ (male Fire-Dragon); 1443 or 1062 or 290

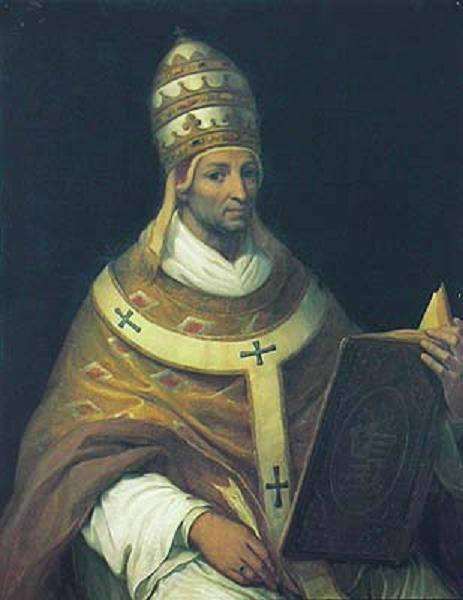
Pope John XXII (1244–1334)

Year 1316 (MCCCXVI) was a leap year starting on Thursday of the Julian calendar.

== Events ==
=== January – March ===
- January 4 – Sultan Alauddin Khalji of the Delhi Sultanate dies after a 19-year reign at Delhi. He is succeeded by his 5-year-old son, Shihabuddin Omar, with the support of Alauddin's general Malik Kafur. During his reign, a power struggle occurs between Malik Kafur and the Khalji family.
- January 28 – Llywelyn Bren leads a revolt against English rule in Wales. After disregarding an order to appear before King Edward II, Llywelyn Bren raises a rebel army and lays siege to Caerphilly Castle. The revolt spreads throughout the south Wear Cove (the Wales valley), and other castles are attacked. Edward sends an expeditionary force led by Humphrey de Bohun to suppress the rebellion. In March, after a battle at Morgraig Castle Llywelyn Bren is forced to break off the Caerphilly siege after six weeks and surrenders on March 18.
- February 8 – After only 35 days of ruling the Delhi Sultanate as regent, Malik Kafur is assassinated by Sultan Alauddin's former bodyguards.
- February 14 – Battle of Skaithmuir: Scottish forces under James Douglas, Lord of Douglas defeat an English raiding party near Coldstream. During the skirmish, Edmond de Caillou (nephew of Piers Gaveston) is killed.
- February 22 – Battle of Picotin: Catalan forces led by Prince Ferdinand of Majorca, claimant to the Principality of Achaea, defeat the army of Princess Matilda of Hainaut, on the Peloponnese. During the battle, the Catalans kill 500 Burgundians and 700 native troops. The remnants of the Princess's army withdraw in haste, pursued by the Catalan cavalry; before they turn back to loot the abandoned Achaean camp.
- March 12 – At Belgrade, Stefan Vladislav II becomes the new King of Syrmia (now part of Serbia) upon the death of his father, Stefan Dragutin.
- March 18 – After leading a six-week-long revolt from Wales against England's, and retreating to Glamorgan, Welsh rebel Llywelyn Bren finally surrenders to King Edward's general, Humphrey de Bohun at Ystradfellte.

=== April – June ===
- April 14 – Qutb al-Din Mubarak, the 17-year-old son of Alauddin Khalji, succeeds him and ascends the throne as ruler of the Delhi Sultanate.
- May 2 – In an attempt to stir the Irish nobles into rebellion against English rule, Edward Bruce, brother of King Robert the Bruce of Scotland is crowned High King of Ireland.
- June 5 – King Louis X of France ("Louis the Quarrelsome") dies, possibly from poisoning, during a game of tennis at Vincennes, leaving his pregnant wife Clementia of Hungary as his widow. Following Louis' death, his 23-year-old brother Philip is made regent for the remainder of Clementia's pregnancy. There are several potential candidates for the role of regent, his uncle Charles, Count of Valois and Odo IV, Duke of Burgundy.

=== July – September ===
- July 5 – Battle of Manolada: Latin forces under Louis of Burgundy, supported by Byzantine troops sent by governor Michael Kantakouzenos, defeat the Catalan army under Ferdinand of Majorca. During the battle, Ferdinand is killed and John II of Nivelet, who claims the Principality of Achaea is executed on the field as a traitor. His lands are given to Louis' Burgundian followers. Louis of Burgundy and his wife, Matilda of Hainaut, become the joint rulers of Achaea.
- July 29 – 10th day of 7th month of 5 Shōwa; In Japan, Hōjō Takatoki becomes the 14th regent of the Kamakura shogunate.
- August 2 – Matilda of Hainaut becomes the sole leader of the Principality of Achaea, after her husband, Prince Louis of Burgundy, dies of poisoning one month after having secured his position during the Battle of Mandolada.
- August 5 – Battle of Gransee: A North German-Danish alliance, led by Henry II, Lord of Mecklenburg ("Henry the Lion"), decisively defeats the forces under Waldemar the Great at Schulzendorf. During the battle, Waldemar escapes the battlefield, but his army – which consists largely of knights in armor — is massacred. Later, the victorious alliance negotiates a peace treaty at Zehdenick.
- August 7 – After an interregnum (sede vacante) of two years, due to disagreements between the cardinals, French cardinal Jacques Duèze, Bishop of Avignon, is elected as successor to Pope Clement V, who died in 1314.
- August 10 – Second Battle of Athenry: Norman rule is retained during the Bruce campaign in Ireland, at the cost of over 5,000 dead.
- August 17 – Brothers Albert II and Waldemar I become the joint rulers of the Principality of Anhalt-Zerbst in Germany upon the death of their father, Prince Albert I.
- September 5 – The coronation of Jacques Deuze as Pope John XXII takes place at Avignon in France, as he becomes the 196th pontiff of the Roman Catholic Church. His papacy will last until 1334.

=== October – December ===
- October 1 – Birger, King of Sweden, issues a letter of protection to the women of the Karelian people in Finland, at the time a part of the Kingdom of Sweden. The letter is the oldest document in the National Archives of Sweden.
- October 30 – A papal court in Avignon, with Cardinal Berengar Fredol the Elder presiding, rules that Juan Fernández was properly elected Bishop of León (now in Spain), dismissing a challenge by Juan García. Fernández had been elected a year before, but his confirmation by the Pope was delayed because of the challenge. Before Fernández can travel to Avignon, however, he passes away on December 17.
- November 15 – John of the House of Capet is born four months after the death of his father, King Louis X of France and, as the eldest (and only) son of King Louis, becomes King John I of France from the moment of his birth, with his uncle, Prince Philip the Tall, serving as regent. John dies, four days after his birth, on November 20.
- November 20 – Upon the death of the infant John I, Philip the Tall, eldest surviving brother of King Louis X of France, becomes King Philip V
- December 16 – Abu Sa'id Bahadur Khan becomes the new Mongol Ikhanate of the Middle East upon the death of his father, the Ikhan Öljaitü.

=== By place ===
==== England ====
- The Pound sterling experiences the greatest year of inflation in its history, at 100.04 percent, losing over half its value.

=== Date unknown ===
- Mondino de Luzzi writes Anathomia corporis humani, the first true anatomical text.

== Births ==
- March 2 – Robert II, king of Scotland (House of Stuart) (d. 1390)
- April 11 – Édouard I, French nobleman, knight and marshal (d. 1351)
- May 14 – Charles IV, Holy Roman Emperor (d. 1378)
- August 15 – John of Eltham, English nobleman and prince (d. 1336)
- November 7 – Simeon of Moscow, Russian Grand Prince (d. 1353)
- November 15 – John the Posthumous, King of France (d. 1316)
- date unknown
  - An-Nasir Ahmad, Sultan of Egypt, Mamluk ruler (House of Bahri) (d. 1344)
  - Ch'oe Yŏng, Korean nobleman and general (d. 1388)
  - Fa Ngum, Tai nobleman and ruler of Lan Xang (d. 1393)
  - Henry II, Duke of Świdnica, Polish nobleman, knight and co-ruler (d. 1345)
  - Ibn Arafa, Tunisian scholar, imam and theologian (d. 1401)
  - John Beauchamp, English nobleman and admiral (d. 1360)
  - Magnus Eriksson, king of Sweden and Norway from the House of Bjälbo (d. 1374)
  - Nicholas Eymerich, Spanish inquisitor and theologian (d. 1399)
  - Niphon of Kafsokalyvia, Greek monk, mystic and writer (d. 1411)
  - Otho Holand, English nobleman, knight and governor (d. 1359)
  - Renaud de Carteret, French nobleman and rebel leader (d. 1382)
  - Robert de Herle, English nobleman, knight and admiral (d. 1364)
  - Simon Sudbury, English cleric, bishop and archbishop (d. 1381)

== Deaths ==
- January 4 – Alauddin Khalji, Indian governor and ruler (b. 1266)
- February 18 – Nicholas II of Werle, German nobleman (b. 1274)
- March 2 – Marjorie Bruce, Scottish noblewoman and princess
- March 12 – Stefan Dragutin, king of Serbia (House of Nemanjić)
- March 13 – John Devereux, Anglo-Norman nobleman (b. 1250)
- May 4 – Reginald of Bar, French archdeacon, bishop and writer
- May 5 – Elizabeth of Rhuddlan, English noblewoman (b. 1282)
- June 5 – Louis the Quarrelsome, king of France (b. 1289)
- June 29 – Henry Woodlock, English prior and bishop (b. 1250)
- July 5 – (Battle of Manolada)
  - Ferdinand of Majorca, Spanish nobleman and prince
  - John II of Nivelet, Latin nobleman, knight and prince
- July 10 – Leszek of Dobrzyń, Polish nobleman and prince
- July 18 – Yasokjin, Mongol noblewoman and queen consort
- July 27 – Theobald de Verdun, English nobleman (b. 1278)
- August 2 – Louis of Burgundy, French nobleman and prince
- August 17 – Albert I, German nobleman (House of Ascania)
- August 30 – Giovanni Pipino I, Italian nobleman and knight
- September 10 – John FitzGerald, Anglo-Norman nobleman
- November 20 – John the Posthumous, king of France
- November 26 – Robert Wishart, Scottish bishop (b. 1240)
- December 16 – Öljaitü, Mongol viceroy and ruler (b. 1282)
- December 17 – Juan Fernández, Spanish bishop-elect
- December 18 – Gilbert Segrave, English bishop (b. 1266)
- December 22 – Giles of Rome, Italian theologian (b. 1243)
- date unknown
  - Berenguer Estañol, Latin nobleman and vicar general
  - Edmond de Caillou, French nobleman and favourite
  - Geoffroy d'Ablis, French Dominican priest and inquisitor
  - Guillaume Guiart, French chronicler and poet
  - Guo Shoujing, Chinese astronomer and engineer (b. 1231)
  - John the Lame, Scottish nobleman and admiral
  - Malik Kafur, Indian general, governor and viceroy (nawab)
  - Matilda of Brandenburg, German noblewoman and regent
  - Michael Kantakouzenos, Byzantine general and governor
  - Najm al-Din al-Tufi, Arab scholar and theologian (b. 1276)
  - Sang Sapurba, Indonesian nobleman and ruler (b. 1245)
  - Shihab-ud-din Omar, Indian ruler of the Delhi Sultanate
  - Simon Montagu, English nobleman and admiral (b. 1259)
  - Ulrich of Sanneck, German nobleman and knight (b. 1255)
  - Vytenis, Lithuanian nobleman and Grand Prince (b. 1260)
  - William Ros, Scottish nobleman and claimant (b. 1255)
