= Richard Orsini =

Count palatine of Cephalonia (died 1303/4)

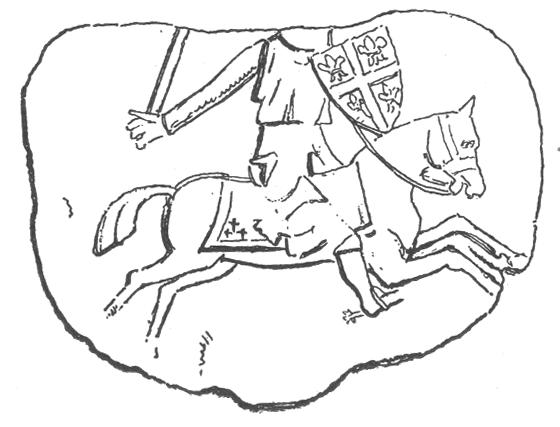
- Seal of Richard Orsini

Count Palatine of Cephalonia and Zakynthos
- Reign: 1238/ca. 1260 – 1303/4
- Predecessor: Matthew Orsini (?)
- Successor: John I Orsini

Count of Gravina
- Reign: 1284–1291
- Predecessor: unknown
- Successor: Peter Tempesta
- Died: 1303 or 1304
- Spouses: unknown first wife Margaret of Villehardouin
- Issue: John I Orsini; Four daughters
- Italian: Riccardo Orsini
- Dynasty: Orsini ('apostolic' branch)
- Father: Matthew Orsini (?) Theodore (?)

Richard Orsini (Italian: Riccardo Orsini) was the count palatine of Cephalonia and Zakynthos from before 1260 to his death in 1303/4, and also Count of Gravina in 1284–91. He also served on behalf of the Angevin Kingdom of Naples as captain-general of Corfu in 1286–90 and as the bailli in the Principality of Achaea from 1297 to 1300. He assisted the Despot of Epirus in battle against the Byzantine Empire, and secured the marriage of his son, John I, to the Epirote ruler's daughter, which would lead in 1318 to the Orsini takeover of Epirus.

== Biography ==
Richard is generally thought to be the son of Matthew Orsini, count palatine of Cephalonia and Zakynthos, and a daughter of the sebastokrator John Komnenos Doukas. However, given the long period between the beginning of Matthew's reign in the first years of the 13th century and the attested date of Richard's death, it is possible that another character is to be intercalated between Matthew and Richard, perhaps the "count Theodore" referred to in a document from 1264 (possibly Matthew's son and Richard's father).

It is unclear when exactly Richard became count palatine; he is not specifically recorded by name in a document until 1264. However, according to the testimony of the later chronicler Marino Sanudo Torcello, he was still a minor around 1262, when William II of Villehardouin assumed the regency for the county after his return from captivity in the Byzantine Empire. Some authors date his accession as early as 1238, the date of the last document referring to Matthew Orsini, often assumed as the date of his death. If so, Richard was then perhaps the "Count of Cephalonia" referred to in a Venetian attempt to form an alliance of the Frankish rulers of Greece in aid of the beleaguered Latin Empire of Constantinople.

Already since Matthew Orsini's time, the county palatine was a vassal of the Principality of Achaea, and through it, after the Treaty of Viterbo, of the Kingdom of Naples. In this capacity he also held the post of captain general of Corfu and Butrint on the Albanian shore in 1286–90. In 1291/92, he participated with 100 knights in a campaign to aid the ruler of Epirus, Nikephoros I Komnenos Doukas, against the Byzantine forces who were besieging Ioannina, along with 400–500 cavalry from Achaea under Nicholas III of Saint Omer. In exchange, Nikephoros sent his daughter, Maria, as a hostage to Cephalonia. After the Byzantines were repelled, she was wed to Richard's son and heir, John I Orsini. This aroused the indignation of Nikephoros, who had not been consulted, and who was not mollified until 1295, when the young couple came to live at his court. This began the involvement of the Orsini counts of Cephalonia with the affairs of Epirus, which would eventually lead, in 1318, to the takeover of Epirus by Richard's grandson, Nicholas Orsini.

Following the death of the Prince of Achaea, Florent of Hainaut, his widow, Princess Isabella of Villehardouin appointed Richard to rule in her stead as bailli and withdrew to the castle of Kalamata. Richard's tenure appears to have been peaceful as regards the conflict with the Byzantines of Mystras, but the issue of the succession remained open as Isabella had but one daughter, Matilda of Hainaut (born 1293). On Richard's suggestion, the young heiress of Achaea was engaged to the young Duke of Athens, Guy II de la Roche. Their marriage took place in 1305. Richard kept his post until 1300, when he was replaced by Nicholas III of Saint Omer, at the advice of chancellor Benjamin of Kalamata. This began a period of rivalry between Richard and Benjamin; in 1303, Richard's friends at court persuaded Prince Philip of Savoy to detain Benjamin, who was released after paying 20,000 hyperpyra as ransom. In turn, Benjamin gained the ear of the Prince, and forced Richard to give up the same sum in exchange for possession of half a village, which returned to the princely domain following Richard's death.

Richard was accidentally killed in 1303 (or, less likely, 1304) by one of his own knights, a man named Lion. He was succeeded by his son, John I.

== Family ==
Richard married twice: the identity of his first wife is unknown, and his second, in 1299, was Margaret of Villehardouin, sister of Princess Isabella. From the first marriage, he had four children: a son, John I Orsini, and three daughters. His three daughters all married into the high nobility of Achaea: one, Guillerme, married the Grand Constable John Chauderon, who died in 1294, and after that Nicholas III of Saint Omer; the second married John of Durnay, Baron of Gritzena; and the third married Engilbert of Liederkerque, a nephew of the Prince Florent of Hainaut, who succeeded Chauderon as Constable. From the second marriage, Richard had a daughter, but she died as an infant.

== Sources ==
- Bon, Antoine (1969). La Morée franque. Recherches historiques, topographiques et archéologiques sur la principauté d'Achaïe [The Frankish Morea. Historical, Topographic and Archaeological Studies on the Principality of Achaea] (in French). Paris: De Boccard.
- Kiesewetter, Andreas (2006). "Preludio alla Quarta Crociata? Megareites di Brindisi, Maio di Cefalonia e la signoria sulle isole ionie (1185-1250)". In Gherardo Ortalli; Giorgio Ravegnani; Peter Schreiner (eds.). Quarta Crociata. Venezia - Bisanzio - Impero latino. Atti delle giornate di studio. Venezia, 4-8 maggio 2004 (in Italian). Venice: Istituto veneto di scienze, lettere ed arti. pp. 317–358. ISBN 8888143742.
- Longnon, Jean (1969) [1962]. "The Frankish States in Greece, 1204–1311". In Setton, Kenneth M.; Wolff, Robert Lee; Hazard, Harry W. (eds.). A History of the Crusades, Volume II: The Later Crusades, 1189–1311. Vol. 2 (Second ed.). Madison, Milwaukee, and London: University of Wisconsin Press. pp. 234–275. ISBN 0-299-04844-6.
- Nicol, Donald M. (1984). The Despotate of Epiros, 1267–1479: A Contribution to the History of Greece in the Middle Ages. Cambridge: Cambridge University Press. ISBN 978-0-521-13089-9.
- Setton, Kenneth M. (1976). The Papacy and the Levant (1204–1571), Volume I: The Thirteenth and Fourteenth Centuries. Vol. 1. Philadelphia: The American Philosophical Society. ISBN 0-87169-114-0.
- Trapp, Erich; Beyer, Hans-Veit; Kaplaneres, Sokrates; Leontiadis, Ioannis (1990). "24307. Ῥιτσάρδος". Prosopographisches Lexikon der Palaiologenzeit (in German). Vol. 10. Vienna: Verlag der Österreichischen Akademie der Wissenschaften. ISBN 3-7001-3003-1.

Vacant Direct administration by Prince Florent Title last held by Guy of Charpigny	Angevin bailli in the Principality of Achaea; 1297–1300	Succeeded by Nicholas III of Saint Omer
Unknown Last known title holder: William de Say	Count of Gravina; 1284–1291	Vacant Title next held by Peter Tempesta
Unknown Last known title holder: Matthew Orsini	Count palatine of Cephalonia and Zakynthos before 1260–1304	Succeeded by John I Orsini
