= Nicholas le Maure =

Lord of Saint-Sauveur, Bailee of the Principality of Achaea

Nicholas le Maure (French: Nicolas le Maure; fl. 1297–1315/6) was a French knight of the Principality of Achaea, lord of Saint-Sauveur, who served as the Principality's bailli on behalf of the Angevins of Naples between 1314 and 1315/6.

== Life ==
Nicholas was the lord of the castle of Saint-Sauveur, an unidentified site, perhaps identical to the monastery of the same name, located some 15 km east of medieval Arcadia (modern Kyparissia) in Messenia.

He appears for the first time in 1297 as one of the witnesses to a deed of transfer of various fiefs by Isabella of Villehardouin, Princess of Achaea, to her sister Margaret. By 1302, he served as captain of the region of Skorta and warden of the Barony of Kalamata for Matilda of Hainaut, who was absent as she had been wed to Guy II de la Roche, Duke of Athens. In 1302/3 he played a leading role in the suppression of the rebellion of the Greeks of the Skorta area, who were aided by the Byzantines of Mystras. After the Byzantines were repulsed, Nicholas installed himself with a strong garrison at Vervena to safeguard Frankish control.

On 2 April 1309, Nicholas was one of the nobles who witnessed the betrothal of Matilda of Hainaut to Charles of Taranto, and after the death of Nicholas III of Saint Omer in early 1314, succeeded him as the Angevin governor and royal representative (bailli) in the Principality. It was in this capacity that he arrested Margaret of Villehardouin, who maintained her rival claims on the Principality against the Angevins, on her arrival at Port-de-Jonc in early summer 1314. Nicholas imprisoned her at the castle of Chlemoutsi, where she died in March 1315.

This helped provoke the invasion of Achaea by Margaret's son-in-law Ferdinand of Majorca, who laid claim on her inheritance. Ferdinand arrived with his army in late June 1315, and although a first attempt to land at Glarentza was beaten off by Nicholas and the troops of Achaea, a second succeeded, and the Achaean barons withdrew to Chlemoutsi. Over the next few months, various barons went over to Ferdinand, while Nicholas retired south to Messenia. When the Angevin-backed Princess Matilda of Hainaut arrived in late 1315 at Port-de-Jonc, he went there to meet her and express his loyalty. Matilda's first effort to defeat Ferdinand was defeated in the Battle of Picotin but finally, after the arrival of her husband, Louis of Burgundy, in the Battle of Manolada in July 1316, Ferdinand was defeated and killed.

Nothing is known of Nicholas after late 1315. His son, Stephen le Maure, succeeded him, and was also lord of the castle of Aetos and Baron of Arcadia through his marriage in 1324 to Agnes of Aulnay, heiress of the barony.

== Sources ==
- Bon, Antoine (1969). La Morée franque. Recherches historiques, topographiques et archéologiques sur la principauté d'Achaïe [The Frankish Morea. Historical, Topographic and Archaeological Studies on the Principality of Achaea] (in French). Paris: De Boccard.
- Topping, Peter (1975). "The Morea, 1311–1364". In Setton, Kenneth M.; Hazard, Harry W. (eds.). A History of the Crusades, Volume III: The Fourteenth and Fifteenth Centuries. Vol. 3. Madison and London: University of Wisconsin Press. pp. 104–140. ISBN 0-299-06670-3.

Unknown	Lord of Saint-Sauveur before 1297 – after 1315/6	Succeeded by Stephen le Maure
Preceded by Nicholas III of Saint Omer	Angevin bailli in the Principality of Achaea; 1314–1315/6	Vacant Direct administration by Princess Matilda of Hainaut and Prince Louis of Burgundy Title next held by Eustachio Pagano de Nocera
