= Barony of Akova =

European polity

- Barony of the Principality of Achaea
- 1209–1320
- Map of the Peloponnese with its principal locations during the late Middle Ages
- Capital: Akova
- Area
  - Coordinates: 37°43′N 21°57′E
  - Type: Feudal lordship
- Historical era: Middle Ages
  - Established: 1209
  - Parliament of Glarentsa: 1276
  - Byzantine reconquest: 1320
Succeeded by
Despotate of the Morea

The Barony of Akova was a medieval Frankish fiefdom of the Principality of Achaea, located in the mountains of eastern Elis in the Peloponnese peninsula in Greece, centred on the fortress of Akova or Mattegrifon (situated near Vyziki in the Tropaia municipal unit). It was among the twelve original baronies of Achaea, but was conquered by the Byzantines in 1320.

== History ==
The Barony of Akova was established c. 1209, after the conquest of the Peloponnese by the Crusaders, and was one of the original twelve secular baronies within the Principality of Achaea. Along with the Barony of Patras, Akova was one of the two largest and most important baronies of the Principality, with twenty-four knight's fees attached to it. The barony's capital was the fortress of Akova or Mattegrifon ('kill-Greek', grifon being a French term for the Greeks) built on the mountainous area known in the Chronicle of the Morea as Mesarea, separating Elis from Arcadia and dominating the upper valley of the Alpheios river, by the baronial family of de Rosières, of Burgundian origin.

The only known baron of the barony's early period is Walter of Rosières, who is first recorded in a list of fief folders in 1228/30 and by the Chronicle as having died childless, c. 1273. To fill the period down to 1209, Karl Hopf hypothesized that there were two barons, father and son, named Walter, but, as A. Bon points out, the existence of a now-forgotten baron before 1228/30 is equally possible. Walter's sole heir was Margaret of Passavant, his sister's daughter by John of Nully, Baron of Passavant. Margaret had resided in Constantinople as a hostage to the Byzantine court since 1262, and on her return to the Principality, she tried to claim her inheritance but was unable to do so, since by Achaean feudal law, any heir had to bring his claim within at least two years and two days from the death of the last holder, or the claim was forfeit. As Margaret had delayed her arrival, Prince William II of Villehardouin had already confiscated the Barony of Akova (Passavant having been lost to the Byzantines). Margaret's claims became the subject of a celebrated legal dispute, which was abjudicated in a parliament held at Glarentsa, probably in 1276. Even though she married the influential John of Saint Omer to promote her claims, the parliament found in favour of the Prince, who nevertheless ceded a third of the barony (8 fiefs) to Margaret and John, while the remainder, along with the fortress of Akova itself, became a fief of William's youngest daughter, Margaret.

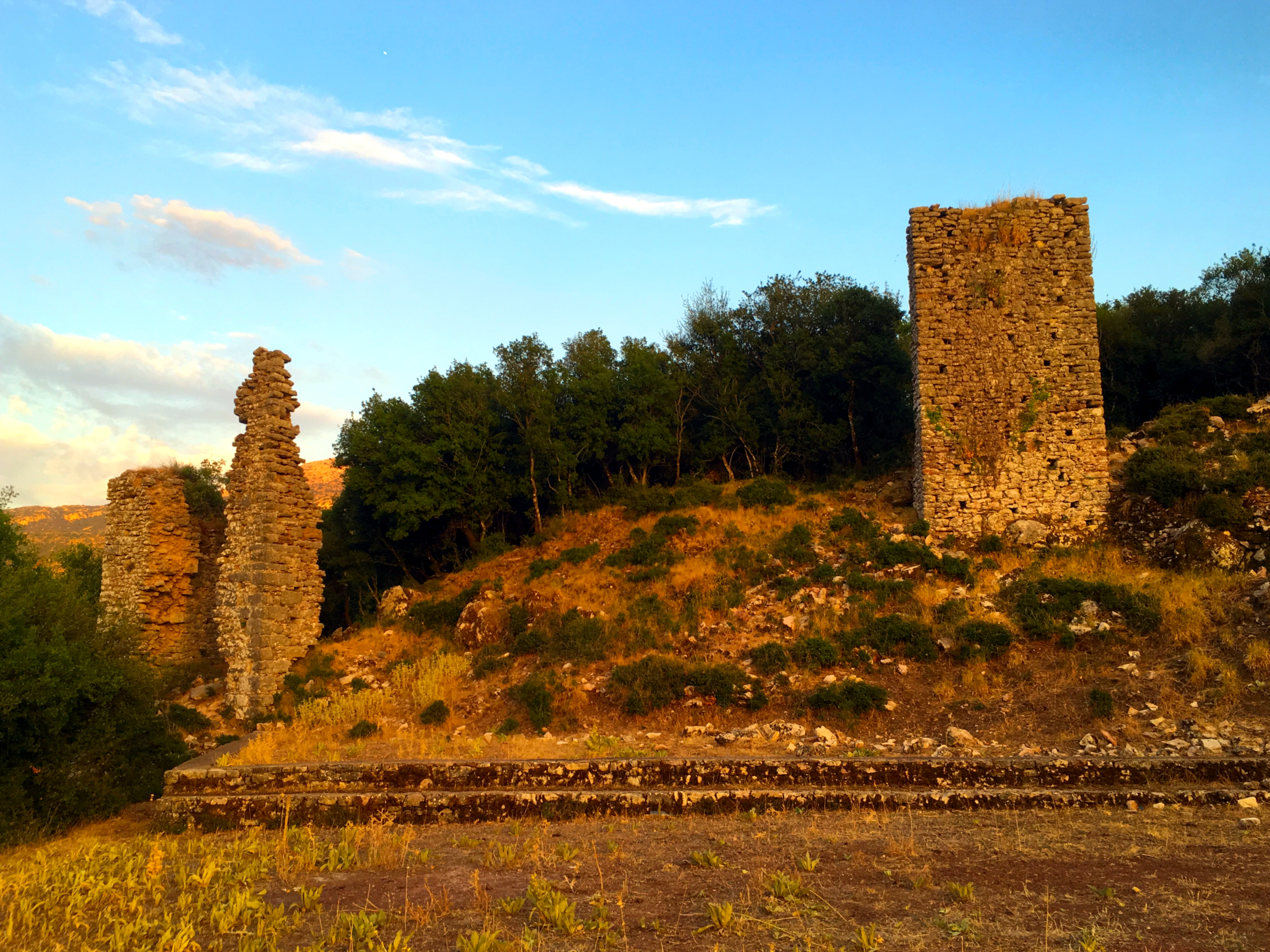
View of the ruins of the Akova Castle.

Margaret of Villehardouin augmented her domains in 1297 through the donation of a few fiefs and castles by her sister, Princess Isabella. In c. 1311, Margaret sought, by virtue of her descent, to claim the Principality, or at least a portion of it, from the Angevin Kings of Naples who had controlled it since 1278. To this end, in February 1314 she wedded her only daughter, Isabel of Sabran, to Ferdinand of Majorca, and passed her titles and claims to them. She then returned to Achaea, where she was imprisoned by the Angevin bailli Nicholas le Maure and died in captivity in February or March 1315. Ferdinand invaded Achaea and tried to claim the Principality from Louis of Burgundy, but fell in the Battle of Manolada in July 1316. In the wake of Margaret's death and the Majorcan invasion, the Barony of Akova was confiscated and added to the princely domain. Five years later, in 1320, Akova along with the castles of Karytaina, Polyphengos, and Saint George in Skorta, fell to the Byzantines under Andronikos Asen.

== Sources ==
- Bon, Antoine (1969). La Morée franque. Recherches historiques, topographiques et archéologiques sur la principauté d'Achaïe [The Frankish Morea. Historical, Topographic and Archaeological Studies on the Principality of Achaea] (in French). Paris: De Boccard. OCLC 869621129.
- Miller, William (1921). Essays on the Latin Orient. Cambridge: Cambridge University Press. OCLC 457893641.
- Topping, Peter (1975). "The Morea, 1364–1460". In Setton, Kenneth M.; Hazard, Harry W. (eds.). A History of the Crusades, Volume III: The Fourteenth and Fifteenth Centuries. Madison and London: University of Wisconsin Press. pp. 141–166. ISBN 0-299-06670-3.
