= Bailli of the Principality of Achaea =

The bailli, bailie, or bailiff was the administrative representative of the Princes of Achaea, ruling the Principality of Achaea in the Prince's absence. The early princes, who belonged to the founding Villehardouin dynasty, resided in the principality, and governed it directly. In 1278, Achaea passed to Charles of Anjou, the King of Naples. Charles, and many of his successors, ruled the principality through their baillis, and never visited it in person. Originally, the baillis were Angevin officials, but the post was often given to powerful feudatories from Achaea and the rest of Frankish Greece.

The administration of other Angevin possessions in Greece, such as Lepanto and the County palatine of Cephalonia and Zakynthos, was also united in the hands of the bailli of Achaea.

== List of baillis ==
| Bailli | Office/Rank | Tenure | Prince | Comments | Ref |
|---|---|---|---|---|---|
| Geoffrey of Villehardouin | Baron of Kalamata and Arcadia | 1208 – 1209 | William of Champlitte | One of the original conquerors of the Morea, he was appointed by Prince William when the latter left to claim his inheritance in Burgundy, until his nephew Hugh arrived to become Prince. When William died en route, followed soon after by Hugh, Geoffrey, supported by the other barons, took power. He was confirmed as Prince of Achaea at the Parliament of Ravennika in May 1209. | |
| Direct rule by Prince Geoffrey I of Villehardouin, 1209–1229 | | | | | |
| Direct rule by Prince Geoffrey II of Villehardouin, 1229–1246 | | | | | |
| Direct rule by Prince William of Villehardouin, 1246–1278 | | | | | |
| John Chauderon | Baron of Estamira and Grand Constable of Achaea | early 1278 | Charles I of Anjou | Appointed provisional bailli by the dying Prince William, until Charles I could make his own arrangements. | |
| Galeran of Ivry | Seneschal of Sicily | August 1278 – August 1280 | Charles I of Anjou | Had troubled relations with the local barons due to his centralizing policies and the unruly behaviour of the Angevin troops. | |
| Philip of Lagonesse | Marshal of Sicily | August 1280 – October 1282 | Charles I of Anjou | Reverted many of his predecessor's policies to conciliate the barons, was recalled upon the outbreak of the War of the Sicilian Vespers. | |
| Narjot de Toucy | Admiral of Sicily | October–November 1282 | Charles I of Anjou | Nominated to succeed Lagonesse, but his duties as admiral prevented him from effectively taking up the office. | |
| Guy of Dramelay | Baron of Chalandritsa | November 1282 – 1285 | Charles I of Anjou | First local baron to be assigned as bailli to keep order while the Angevins were focused on the War of the Sicilian Vespers. | |
| William I de la Roche | Duke of Athens | 1285–1287 | Charles II of Anjou | Most powerful of the Latin lords in Greece, held office until his death. | |
| Nicholas II of Saint Omer | Lord of half of Thebes | 1287 – July 1289 | Charles II of Anjou | At the time the second-most powerful lord after the underage Duke of Athens, Guy II de la Roche. | |
| Guy of Charpigny | Baron of Vostitsa | July – September 1289 | Charles II of Anjou | | |
| Direct rule of Princess Isabella of Villehardouin and Florent of Hainaut, September 1289 – January 1297 | | | | | |
| Richard Orsini | Count Palatine of Cephalonia and Zakynthos | January 1297 – spring 1300 | Isabella (with Philip of Savoy from 1301) | An elderly and experienced man, he was father-in-law to three of the most important barons of Achaea. He was named bailli after the death of Prince Florent and the withdrawal of Isabella to Kalamata. | |
| Nicholas III of Saint Omer | Lord of Thebes, Akova, and Marshal of Achaea | spring 1300 – 1302 | Isabella (with Philip of Savoy from 1301) | | |
| Direct rule of Prince Philip of Savoy, 1302–1305 | | | | | |
| Nicholas III of Saint Omer | Lord of Thebes, Akova, and Marshal of Achaea | 1305–1307 | Isabella with Philip of Savoy | | |
| Guy II de la Roche | Duke of Athens | 1307–1308 | Philip II of Taranto | | |
| Bertin Visconte | | | Philip II of Taranto | | |
| Gilles de la Plainche | | 1311 | Philip II of Taranto | | |
| Nicholas III of Saint Omer | Lord of Thebes, Akova, and Marshal of Achaea | 1311–1314? | Philip II of Taranto | | |
| Nicholas III of Saint Omer | Lord of Thebes, Akova, and Marshal of Achaea | 1311–1314? | Matilda of Hainaut (with Louis of Burgundy until 1316) | | |
| Nicholas le Maure | Lord of Saint-Sauveur | 1314–1315/6 | Matilda of Hainaut (with Louis of Burgundy until 1316) | | |
| Eustachio Pagano de Nocera | | | Matilda of Hainaut (with Louis of Burgundy until 1316) | | |
| Frederick Trogisio | | 1318–1321 | Matilda of Hainaut (with Louis of Burgundy until 1316) | | |
| Frederick Trogisio | | 1318–1321 | Louis ΙΙ of Bourbon | | |
| Ligorio Guindazzo | | 1321–1322 | John of Gravina | | |
| Perronet de Villamastray | | 1322–1323 | John of Gravina | | |
| Nicolas de Joinville | | 1323–1325 | John of Gravina | | |
| Pierre de Sus | | 1326–1327 | John of Gravina | | |
| Francesco de la Monaca | | 1327–1329 | John of Gravina | | |
| William Frangipani | Latin Archbishop of Patras | 1329–1331 | John of Gravina | | |
| Gerardo d'Anguilara | | 1331–1332 | John of Gravina | | |
| Gaudino Romano de Scalea | | April–August 1333 | Catherine of Valois (as regent for Robert of Taranto) | | |
| Pietro de San Severo | | August 1333 – July 1336 | Catherine of Valois (as regent for Robert of Taranto) | | |
| Bertrand of Les Baux | Lord of Courthezon. He also received the title of Marshal of Achaea. | July 1336 – summer 1338 | Catherine of Valois (as regent for Robert of Taranto) | | |
| Direct rule of Princess Catherine of Valois, 1338–1341 | | | | | |
| Bertrand of Les Baux | | February/July 1341 – before July 1344 | Robert of Taranto (with Catherine of Valois until 1346) | | |
| Adam "Visconte de Tremblay" | | 1346? | Robert of Taranto (with Catherine of Valois until 1346) | Attested only in the Aragonese version of the Chronicle of the Morea. Likely identical with Adam Visconte, an associate of Niccolò Acciaioli. First tenure. | |
| Menillo Acrimeno of Naples | | | Robert of Taranto (with Catherine of Valois until 1346) | Attested only in the Aragonese version of the Chronicle of the Morea. | |
| Nicolas Bocuto of Naples | | | Robert of Taranto (with Catherine of Valois until 1346) | Attested only in the Aragonese version of the Chronicle of the Morea as serving before John Delbuy. | |
| John Delbuy | Knight | c. July 1348 | Robert of Taranto (with Catherine of Valois until 1346) | A French knight, he was chosen by Robert's wife, Marie de Bourbon, during Prince Robert's captivity at the hands of Louis I of Hungary. Died shortly after arriving in Achaea. | |
| Philip of Jonvelle | Baron of Vostitsa | | Robert of Taranto (with Catherine of Valois until 1346) | Elected by the barons of Achaea to replace Delbuy after his death. | |
| Bertrand | Archbishop of Salerno | | Robert of Taranto (with Catherine of Valois until 1346) | Chosen by Marie de Bourbon. | |
| Galeoto del Goto | Knight | c. 1352 | Robert of Taranto (with Catherine of Valois until 1346) | An Apulian knight, he is attested only in the Aragonese version of the Chronicle of the Morea. | |
| Adam "Visconte de Tremblay" | | unknown | Robert of Taranto (with Catherine of Valois until 1346) | Second tenure, according to the Chronicle of the Morea, which records him after Galeoto del Goto. | |
| Walter of Lor | Knight | unknown | Robert of Taranto (with Catherine of Valois until 1346) | A French knight, he is attested only in the Aragonese version of the Chronicle of the Morea, which records him after the second tenure of Adam "Visconte de Tremblay". | |
| Pietro Minutolo | | c. June/October 1355 | Robert of Taranto (with Catherine of Valois until 1346) | Attested in two letters by Robert of Taranto, but not in the Chronicle of the Morea. | |
| Philip of San Blas | Knight | unknown | Robert of Taranto (with Catherine of Valois until 1346) | An Apulian knight, he is attested only in the Aragonese version of the Chronicle of the Morea, which records him after Walter of Lor. | |
| Perroto Arrimeno | | unknown | Robert of Taranto (with Catherine of Valois until 1346) | Possibly a brother or relative of Menillo Acrimeno, he is attested only in the Aragonese version of the Chronicle of the Morea, which records him after Philip of San Blas. He died in office. | |
| Nicholas Ballena | Chancellor of Achaea | unknown | Robert of Taranto (with Catherine of Valois until 1346) | According to the Aragonese version of the Chronicle of the Morea, he was chosen by the barons on Arrimeno's death. His name is otherwise attested in 1354 and 1362. | |
| Adam "Visconte de Tremblay" | | unknown | Robert of Taranto (with Catherine of Valois until 1346) | Third tenure, according to the Chronicle of the Morea, following Ballena. | |
| Carresello | Knight | unknown | Robert of Taranto (with Catherine of Valois until 1346) | A Neapolitan knight, possibly a member of the Caracciollo family, attested only in the Aragonese version of the Chronicle of the Morea. | |
| Francisco de Massa | Latin Archbishop of Corinth | unknown | Robert of Taranto (with Catherine of Valois until 1346) | Attested in contemporary documents, but not in the Chronicle of the Morea. | |
| Alexander Brancaccio Imbriaco | Marshal of Sicily and of Achaea | unknown | Robert of Taranto (with Catherine of Valois until 1346) | Attested in contemporary documents, but not in the Chronicle of the Morea. | |
| Louis, Count of Enghien | | 1370–1371 | Philip III of Taranto | | |
| Balthasar de Sorba | | 1371–1373 | Philip III of Taranto | | |
| Centurione I Zaccaria | Baron of Damala, Chalandritsa, Estamira, and Grand Constable of Achaea | ?–1376/7 | Joanna of Naples | | |
| Paolo Foscari | Latin Archbishop of Patras | 1376/7 | Joanna of Naples | | |
| Daniel del Caretto | | 1377–1378 | Achaea leased to the Knights Hospitaller under Juan Fernández de Heredia, 1377–1381 | | |
| Dominic de Alamania | | 1380 | Achaea leased to the Knights Hospitaller under Juan Fernández de Heredia, 1377–1381 | | |
| Mahiot de Coquerel | | 1381–? | James of Baux | | |
| Interregnum: De facto rule by the Navarrese Company, multiple claimants to the princely title, 1383–1396 | | | | | |
| Angelo II Acciaioli | Cardinal | 1394–? | Ladislaus of Naples | Appointed as Latin Archbishop of Patras at the same time as bailli. | |
| Direct rule by Prince Pedro de San Superano, 1396–1402 | | | | | |
| Direct rule by Princess Maria II Zaccaria, 1402–1404 | | | | | |
| Direct rule by Prince Centurione II Zaccaria , 1404–1432 | | | | | |

== Sources ==
- Bon, Antoine (1969). La Morée franque. Recherches historiques, topographiques et archéologiques sur la principauté d'Achaïe [The Frankish Morea. Historical, Topographic and Archaeological Studies on the Principality of Achaea] (in French). Paris: De Boccard. OCLC 869621129.
- Dourou-Iliopoulou, Maria (2005). Το Φραγκικό Πριγκιπάτο της Αχαΐας (1204-1432). Ιστορία. Οργάνωση. Κοινωνία. [The Frankish Principality of Achaea (1204-1432). History. Organization. Society.] (in Greek). Thessaloniki: Vanias Publications. ISBN 978-960-288-153-8.
- Fine, John V. A. Jr. (1994) [1987]. The Late Medieval Balkans: A Critical Survey from the Late Twelfth Century to the Ottoman Conquest. Ann Arbor, Michigan: University of Michigan Press. ISBN 978-0-472-10079-8.
- Longnon, Jean (1969) [1962]. "The Frankish States in Greece, 1204–1311". In Setton, Kenneth M.; Wolff, Robert Lee; Hazard, Harry W. (eds.). A History of the Crusades, Volume II: The Later Crusades, 1189–1311. Vol. 2 (Second ed.). Madison, Milwaukee, and London: University of Wisconsin Press. pp. 234–275. ISBN 0-299-04844-6.
- Miller, William (1908). The Latins in the Levant: A History of Frankish Greece (1204–1566). London: John Murray.
- Topping, Peter (1975). "The Morea, 1311–1364". In Setton, Kenneth M.; Hazard, Harry W. (eds.). A History of the Crusades, Volume III: The Fourteenth and Fifteenth Centuries. Vol. 3. Madison and London: University of Wisconsin Press. pp. 104–140. ISBN 0-299-06670-3.
- Topping, Peter (1975). "The Morea, 1364–1460". In Setton, Kenneth M.; Hazard, Harry W. (eds.). A History of the Crusades, Volume III: The Fourteenth and Fifteenth Centuries. Vol. 3. Madison and London: University of Wisconsin Press. pp. 141–166. ISBN 0-299-06670-3.
