= Battle of Manolada =

1316 conflict between the forces of Louis of Burgundy and Ferdinand of Majorca

Coordinates: 38.0500°N 21.3500°E

Date	July 5, 1316
Location	Manolada on the Elian Plain
Result	Victory for Louis of Burgundy

Belligerents
Burgundians, Byzantines	Majorcans

Commanders and leaders
Louis of Burgundy	Ferdinand of Majorca †

The Battle of Manolada was fought on July 5, 1316, at Manolada, on the plains of Elis in the Peloponnese. The two leaders were Louis of Burgundy and the infante Ferdinand of Majorca, both of whom claimed the Principality of Achaea in right of their wives. The defeat and death of Ferdinand ensured the continued Angevin supremacy over Achaea and checked the further movement of his allies, the Catalan Company then occupying the Duchy of Athens.

== Background ==
By the terms of the Treaty of Viterbo, the Angevins of the Kingdom of Naples had inherited the Principality of Achaea upon the death of William II Villehardouin in 1278. They had, for some time, granted it to William's older daughter, Isabella of Villehardouin, to rule. However, they remained feudal overlords of the Principality and retook in 1307, due to the misgovernment of Isabella's husband Philip of Savoy. In 1312, on the death of Isabella, her younger sister, Margaret, claimed the Principality under the terms of her father's will, which conflicted with the Treaty of Viterbo.

The Angevins, as part of a complex marital pact and transfer of rights, arranged the marriage of Isabella's eldest daughter, Matilda of Hainaut, to Louis of Burgundy in 1313, and invested the couple with the Principality. Margaret of Villehardouin, for her own part, arranged the marriage of her daughter, Isabella of Sabran, to Ferdinand of Majorca, a member of the House of Barcelona and opponent of the Angevins.

== Prelude ==
Ferdinand arrived in the Principality first, in mid-1315, near the port city Glarentza, which he took after an early setback. In the following weeks, he proceeded to conquer the plain of Elis, including Andravida, the capital of the Principality, a conquest which he considered complete by 17 August 1315.

It was another few months before Louis was even on his way to the Principality, first stopping in Venice to procure more aid against the usurper. In the meantime, Louis' wife, Matilda of Hainaut, travelled directly to the Principality, whereupon she was greeted by a number of local lords, including John I Orsini, the count of Cephalonia, and Nicholas of Dramelay, the baron of Chalandritsa, who repudiated their earlier oaths to Ferdinand and declared for her.

In response, Ferdinand attacked and conquered Chalandritsa, but failed to do the same at Patras. It was not long after this that the forces of Ferdinand engaged the forces of Margaret at the Battle of Picotin, which saw the former victorious.

It was about this time that Louis finally arrived in the Principality.

After an unsuccessful attempt to capture the castle of Chalandritsa from Ferdinand, Louis moved to Patras, where his troops were reinforced by Byzantine forces sent by the governor of Mistra, Michael Kantakouzenos. For his own part, Ferdinand expected reinforcements from the Catalans in the Duchy of Athens and from Majorca, but rather than retreat to Glarentza to await their arrival, he determined to give battle.

== Description ==
At the onset, the Majorcan troops broke the first Burgundian line, commanded by John Orsini, count of Cephalonia. However, the second line, under the direct command of Louis, crushed the Majorcan charge, and Ferdinand was knocked from his horse and inadvertently slain before he could be taken prisoner. As a result, the morale of his troops collapsed, and many fled towards Glarentza.

== Aftermath ==
John II of Nivelet had gone over to Ferdinand's side, and was executed on the field as a traitor by Louis. The head of Ferdinand was displayed before the gates of Glarentza, still held against Louis, the next day. The reinforcements sent by the Catalan Company had reached Vostitsa by the time of the battle, but returned to Athens on the news of Ferdinand's death. Troops from Majorca arrived by sea at Glarentza ten days later, and proposed holding the city in the name of Ferdinand's son James, but, with the aid of bribes, were eventually persuaded to surrender the city to Louis.

However, Louis did not long enjoy his victory, dying only four weeks after the battle, leaving the 22-year-old, twice widowed Matilda ruler of the crumbling principality.

== Analysis ==
It is believed that had Ferdinand not been checked, the House of Aragon and its Catalan troops would have acquired Achaea, as well as Athens. His death, followed by the long minority and tumultuous career of James, would effectively end the threat posed to the Angevins by the claims of Margaret of Villehardouin.
