= Gerardo d'Anguilara =

Italian politician

Gerardo d'Anguilara served as bailli of the Principality of Achaea for its absent Prince, John of Gravina, from 1331 to 1332.

== Sources ==
- Bon, Antoine (1969). La Morée franque. Recherches historiques, topographiques et archéologiques sur la principauté d'Achaïe [The Frankish Morea. Historical, Topographic and Archaeological Studies on the Principality of Achaea] (in French). Paris: De Boccard.

Political offices
Preceded by William Frangipani	Angevin bailli in the Principality of Achaea; 1331–1332	Succeeded by Gaudino Romano della Scala
