= Francesco de la Monaca =

Italian politician

Francesco de la Monaca served as bailli of the Principality of Achaea for its absent Prince, John of Gravina, from 1327 to 1329.

== Sources ==
- Bon, Antoine (1969). La Morée franque. Recherches historiques, topographiques et archéologiques sur la principauté d'Achaïe [The Frankish Morea. Historical, Topographic and Archaeological Studies on the Principality of Achaea] (in French). Paris: De Boccard. OCLC 869621129.

Political offices
Preceded by Pierre de Sus	Angevin bailli in the Principality of Achaea; 1327–1329	Succeeded by William Frangipani
