= Pierre de Sus =

Pierre de Sus served as bailli of the Principality of Achaea following the departure of Prince John of Gravina for Italy in spring 1326. He remained in office until 1327.

== Sources ==
- Bon, Antoine (1969). La Morée franque. Recherches historiques, topographiques et archéologiques sur la principauté d'Achaïe [The Frankish Morea. Historical, Topographic and Archaeological Studies on the Principality of Achaea] (in French). Paris: De Boccard. OCLC 869621129.

Vacant Direct administration by Prince John of Gravina Title last held by Nicolas de Joinville	Angevin bailli in the Principality of Achaea; 1326–1327	Succeeded by Francesco de la Monaca
