= Matilda of Hainaut =

Princess of Achaea from 1316 to 1321

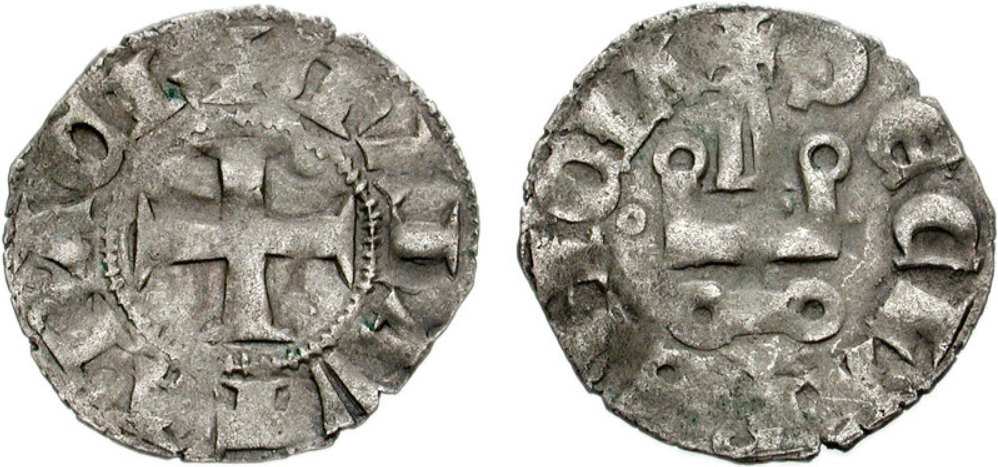
- Denier minted under Matilda

Princess of Achaea
- Reign: 5 July 1316 – 1321
- Predecessor: Ferdinand of Majorca
- Successor: John of Gravina
- Co-regent: Louis of Burgundy (1316)
- Born: November 1293
- Died: 1331 (aged 37–38); Aversa
- Spouse: Guy II de la Roche (m. 1300; died 1308) Louis of Burgundy (m. 1313; died 1316): Hugh de la Palisse (Note: Matilda's 1318 "marriage ceremony" to John of Gravina is not counted here as she refused to recognize him as her husband and the attempts to marry the two eventually ceased in 1321.) (m. c. 1320; died 1321)
- House: Avesnes
- Father: Florent of Hainaut
- Mother: Isabella of Villehardouin

Matilda of Hainaut (French: Mathilde de Hainaut; November 1293 – 1331), also known as Maud and Mahaut, was Princess of Achaea from 1316 to 1321. She was the only child of Isabella of Villehardouin and Florent of Hainaut, co-rulers of Achaea from 1289 to 1297. After Florent's death in 1297, Isabella continued to rule alone until she remarried to Philip of Savoy in 1300. Per arrangements made with King Charles II of Naples, Isabella was not allowed to marry without his consent and after Philip failed to adequately participate in the king's campaigns against Epirus, Charles in 1307 revoked their rights to Achaea. Matilda, just fourteen years old, tried to press her claim as their heir but was refused by the bailiff Nicholas III of Saint Omer, who instead chose to wait for orders from Naples. Shortly thereafter, Charles appointed his favorite son, Philip of Taranto as the new Prince of Achaea.

Philip of Taranto spent little time in Greece and appointed as his bailiff Guy II de la Roche, Matilda's husband (whom she had married at age 7, about 7 years earlier). Guy did not last long in this position, dying in 1308. Matilda was then betrothed by Philip of Taranto to his eldest son, Charles of Taranto. In 1313, this betrothal was broken off and Matilda was married to Louis of Burgundy as compensation to the House of Burgundy due to Philip of Taranto in the same year having married Catherine of Valois, previously betrothed to Hugh V, Duke of Burgundy. Philip of Taranto also renounced his rulership of Achaea and bestowed the Principality of Achaea on Matilda and Louis. Before they had travelled to their new domain, Achaea was seized in 1315 by the usurper Ferdinand of Majorca. Matilda and Louis landed in Achaea in early 1316 and secured control of the principality after the defeat and death of Ferdinand in the Battle of Manolada. Their co-rule did not last long; Louis died less than a month later, widowing Matilda (now 22-years-old) for the second time.

The new king of Naples, Robert, wished to exploit Matilda's uncertain position to gain the principality back for his family. In 1317, he proposed that Matilda should marry his brother, John of Gravina. Matilda refused as she did not wish to enter into a third political marriage. In 1318, Robert's emissaries abducted the princess and brought her to Naples by force. She was forced to go through a marriage ceremony with John, but she refused to recognize him as her husband. In 1321, Matilda was dragged in front of Pope John XXII who ordered her to obey Robert and marry John, but she still refused. Matilda then confessed that she had secretly married the knight Hugh de la Palisse. No more attempts were made to marry her to John but Robert could now revoke Achaea from her control as she had married without his consent. Robert also fabricated a story that Hugh had made an attempt on his life, and that Matilda was his accomplice, and used this as an excuse to imprison the princess. Matilda spent the rest of her life as a prisoner, first in the Castel dell'Ovo in Naples and then in Aversa, where she died in 1331.

== Background and early life ==
=== Family and Achaean–Neapolitan politics ===
Detailed political map of southern Greece in the late 13th century

Born in November 1293, Matilda of Hainaut was the only child of Isabella of Villehardouin and Florent of Hainaut, who ruled the Principality of Achaea together from 1289 to 1297. Matilda's mother was the eldest daughter of William of Villehardouin (Prince of Achaea 1246–1278). William's death in 1278 rendered the male line of the Villehardouin family extinct. As part of a marriage between Isabella and Philip of Sicily, a younger son of King Charles I of Naples, William acknowledged Charles and Charles's descendants as his heirs even if Isabella and Philip had no children. Philip predeceased Charles and died childless, which meant that Charles succeeded William as prince in 1278 without opposition. By 1289, Charles I's son and successor, King Charles II, presided over an economically poor and politically tumultuous Achaea. Upon the advice of some local barons, he arranged the marriage of Isabella and Florent and granted the principality to them as his vassals. Charles II's only condition was that if Florent died, Isabella or any daughters were not to remarry without royal consent: if they did, the principality was to revert to the king.

Upon the death of Florent in early 1297, Matilda's mother became the sole ruler of the principality. Matilda was three years old at the time of her father's death. In order to safeguard the principality through establishing a marriage alliance, the young princess was soon married off to Guy II de la Roche, the Duke of Athens, who had only recently come of age. The three-year-old Matilda was sent to Athens, but Charles II did not accept the marriage and on 3 July 1299 he reminded Guy that Matilda was not allowed to marry without royal consent, ordering that she be sent back to Achaea. Isabella and Guy had already appealed to Pope Boniface VIII to sanction the marriage since Isabella and Guy's mother Helena Angelina Komnene were cousins. After the Pope sanctioned the marriage on 9 August 1299, there was little Charles II could do to stop it and the king thus also gave his consent on 20 April 1300.

Isabella did not remain a widow for long: also in 1300, she met with Philip of Savoy, supposedly a valiant knight, in Rome (although negotiations had apparently been going on for some time) and shortly thereafter married him. The marriage was supported by Pope Boniface VIII. Though Charles II initially objected and tried to appeal to the 1289 agreement with Isabella and Florent, he eventually relented and reluctantly invested Philip as Prince of Achaea. Relations between Charles and Philip, which had not been off to a good start, worsened over the years due to Philip's reluctance, and at times outright refusal, to aid the kings in his wars against the Despotate of Epirus. As a result, Charles resolved to appeal not only to the marriage between Isabella and Philip having happened without his consent but also to Philip's breach of the feudal code and thus in 1307 revoked the rights of both Philip and Isabella to the principality. Philip had foreseen this and had shortly before returned to the Savoyard state, leaving the bailiff Nicholas III of Saint Omer in charge.

=== Claimant heiress to Achaea ===
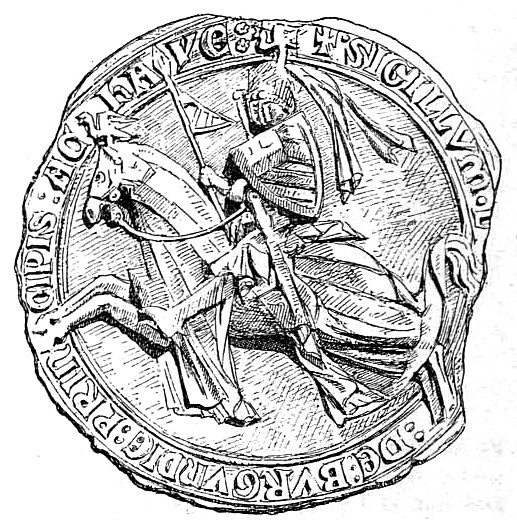
Seal of Louis of Burgundy, Matilda's second husband

Upon the deposition of her mother and step-father, Matilda, approximately fourteen years old, tried to claim the principality for herself but Nicholas refused her and instead chose to wait for orders from Charles. Matilda's husband Guy II was outraged and as revenge captured portions of the city of Thebes that had been held by Nicholas. Charles ignored the claim of Matilda and instead bestowed the principality on the favorite of his younger sons, Philip of Taranto. In order to ensure that Isabella and Philip of Savoy did not try to regain Achaea, Charles and his son bribed them through offering them the fief of Alba in Italy, on the shores of the Fucine Lake, as compensation. Isabella was reluctantly forced to accept these terms and died not long after, in 1312. Her will, written in 1311, outright disregarded the revocation of Achaea and designated Matilda as the "heiress of all Achaea", with the exception of a handful of castles that Isabella left to her own sister, Margaret of Villehardouin. Philip of Taranto did not stay in Achaea for long, leaving to wage an unsuccessful campaign against Epirus and then returning to Naples. As his bailiff (as with Nicholas before him effectively a regent) he named Guy, Matilda's husband. Guy's position as the de facto ruler of Achaea was strengthened by his marriage to Matilda, granting a certain dynastic legitimacy, and by him at this point being the most powerful feudal lord in Greece.

Guy did not enjoy this position for long, as he died of illness already on 8 October 1308, the last of his line, making the young Matilda a widow. In order to ensure that Matilda would not attempt to enforce her claim to Achaea against himself, Philip of Taranto betrothed her to his eldest son, Charles of Taranto.

Philip of Taranto's tenure as Prince of Achaea would prove to be brief. In 1313 he married Catherine of Valois, the titular Latin Empress. Up until their marriage, Catherine had been betrothed to Hugh V of Burgundy, but with the consent of Pope Clement V this betrothal was broken off. Hugh's mother (Hugh himself at this time being a minor) Agnes of France only accepted to break off the betrothal after Catherine (also a child) swore in front of witnesses that she preferred Philip due to Hugh not being strong enough to "undertake the needs of the empire". In order to compensate the House of Burgundy, a marriage was arranged between Louis of Burgundy, Hugh's younger brother, and Matilda, whose betrothal to Charles of Taranto was broken off. Upon the marriage of Matilda and Louis, probably on 29 July 1313, Philip of Taranto renounced all of his rights to Achaea, bestowing them upon Matilda and Louis, and in turn he became the titular Latin Emperor through his marriage to Catherine.

=== War against Ferdinand of Majorca ===
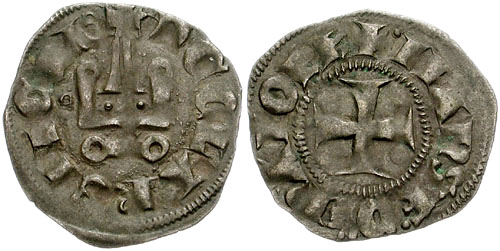
Denier minted in Achaea under Ferdinand of Majorca

Unfortunately for Matilda, Louis delayed in travelling to Greece, having to stay in Burgundy until 1316 to prepare and to deal with the early death of his brother Hugh in May 1315. In the meantime, rival claimants to their position arose in the principality. Matilda's aunt, Margaret of Villehardouin, the last living member of the Villehardouin dynasty, claimed the principality for herself. Margaret based her claim on a supposed will by her father William, which stated that in the event of Isabella's death without children, Margaret would inherit the principality. Since this document was assumed to be a forgery and in any case still made Matilda out to be the heir, both the Kingdom of Naples and the feudal lords in the principality rejected Margaret's claim. To gather support, Margaret married her daughter Isabella of Sabran off to the Catalan prince Ferdinand of Majorca. As her daughter's dowry, Margaret bestowed upon Ferdinand her claim to Achaea. Angered by this, the lords of Achaea assaulted Margaret's castle at Chlemoutsi and captured the would-be-princess. Margaret died in prison in 1315. Isabella of Sabran died only two months later, but she and Ferdinand had a son together, James, and Ferdinand intended to enforce their claim.

In the summer of 1315, Ferdinand and his army, composed of 500 mounted soldiers and a significantly larger amount of infantry, landed near Glarentza and defeated a small army that had been assembled to stop him. He was thereafter proclaimed the new Prince of Achaea by the citizens of Glarentza. Ferdinand was initially successful, capturing several fortresses and minting his own coins, and by early 1316 he controlled the majority of the principality. Matilda and Louis soon arrived to claim their inheritance. Matilda arrived first, travelling directly from Marseille in Burgundy to Navarino, accompanied by a force of 1,000 Burgundians. At Navarino she received word of the support of the Archbishop of Patras and William I Sanudo, Duke of Naxos, of her cause. The bailiff, Nicholas le Maure, also came to pledge his support, alongside various barons. Soon thereafter, Matilda's troops engaged Ferdinand's army in the costly Battle of Picotin, where Ferdinand was victorious.

Louis arrived to Achaea soon thereafter, accompanied by his own contingent of Burgundian soldiers as well as troops sent by John I Orsini, the Count of Cephalonia. Unable to defeat this larger force, which was soon also bolstered even more after Louis allied with Michael Kantakouzenos, the Byzantine governor of Mystras, Ferdinand sent for aid from Athens and Majorca. No reinforcements would arrive since Ferdinand was decisively defeated by Louis on 5 July 1316 at the Battle of Manolada. Ferdinand was killed either during the battle after being thrown from his horse, or beheaded after being ambushed during an argument with his companions in the battle's aftermath, depending on the account.

== Princess of Achaea ==
=== Rule ===
The triumphant Matilda and Louis would not get to enjoy their victory over Ferdinand for long. Less than a month after becoming the undisputed rulers of the principality, Louis died. Some contemporaries suspected John I Orsini of Cephalonia to be behind his death through poison, though what motive he would have had is unclear. (Note: There was talk among the nobility of Burgundy of avenging Louis's murder, blaming John, but John passed away himself a few months later.) In any case, Louis's death left Matilda, aged 23 and twice a widow, as the sole ruler of Achaea, a land torn apart by civil war less than a month prior. She was also surrounded by enemies; the Byzantine Empire eagerly wished to retake the entire peninsula and the Duchy of Athens, now under Catalan rule, was hostile to the Angevins of Naples.

Matilda's precarious position is evident as she in early 1317 was unable to send any of her own troops to protect her vassals, the barons of Euboea, from an invasion by the Catalan Company. She did however send for aid from the Republic of Venice, which responded by sending twenty warships to Euboea and successfully fended off the Catalans on Matilda's behalf. Some documents suggest that Matilda might have been pondering ceding Euboea to Venice.

=== Refusal to marry John of Gravina ===
The new king of Naples, Charles II's son Robert, saw opportunity in Matilda's uncertain position. Robert schemed to once more put his family on the throne of Achaea, despite Philip of Taranto having renounced the principality only three years prior. Robert's straightforward plan was simply to marry his younger brother, John of Gravina, to Matilda. In 1317, Matilda refused the proposal, unwilling to enter into a third political marriage. Undeterred, Robert then sent his emissaries to bring Matilda to Naples by force. In 1318, she was forced by Robert to go through a marriage ceremony with John, after which John immediately assumed the title of Prince of Achaea. Despite the ceremony and John's assumption of the title, Matilda continued to refuse to recognize John as her husband. As part of his efforts to legitimize John's rule of Achaea, Robert then, on 13 June 1318, forced Matilda to choose between recognizing John as her husband or signing away her rights to the principality. This arbitrary interference with Matilda's rights caused her brother-in-law, Odo IV of Burgundy (who was Louis's designated heir) (Note: Odo had not pressed his claim at the time of Louis's death since the grant of the principality to Louis and Matilda specified that Matilda, in the event of Louis's death, was to rule the principality until her own death and that it thereafter would go to the House of Burgundy. Robert's efforts to revoke the principality from the still-living Matilda directly violated this agreement and meant that Odo would never inherit Achaea.) to protest on her behalf and she also appealed to the Republic of Venice for aid. Venice however did nothing and Odo was soon silenced by Philip of Taranto purchasing his claims. Though Matilda was allowed to go on a pilgrimage to Rome, Robert kept constant watch over her to ensure that she did not escape from his reach.

Helpless and without allies, Matilda was transported to Avignon in 1321 and dragged in front of Pope John XXII who ordered her to obey Robert and marry John of Gravina. Even in the face of the pope, Matilda remained defiant and refused to marry John, this time stating that she had already secretly married Hugh de la Palisse, a Burgundian knight whom she was very attached to. This secret marriage had taken place at some point between her abduction to Naples and her arrival to Avignon (1318–1321). Hugh was probably among the knights that had travelled to Achaea alongside her husband in 1316. Though this relieved her of recognizing John as her husband, their "betrothal" being broken off, Robert used the secret marriage as an excuse to revoke the principality from her. As justification Robert pointed to the 1289 agreement with Matilda's parents that she was not to remarry without royal Neapolitan consent. For good measure Robert in September 1322 also fabricated a story that Hugh de La Palice was attempting to have him killed and that Matilda was in on the crime. Matilda was thus not only deposed but also arrested for an imaginary crime. In a ceremony at the papal court on 5 January 1322, John of Gravina was finally formally invested as Prince of Achaea by Robert.

== Imprisonment, later life and death ==
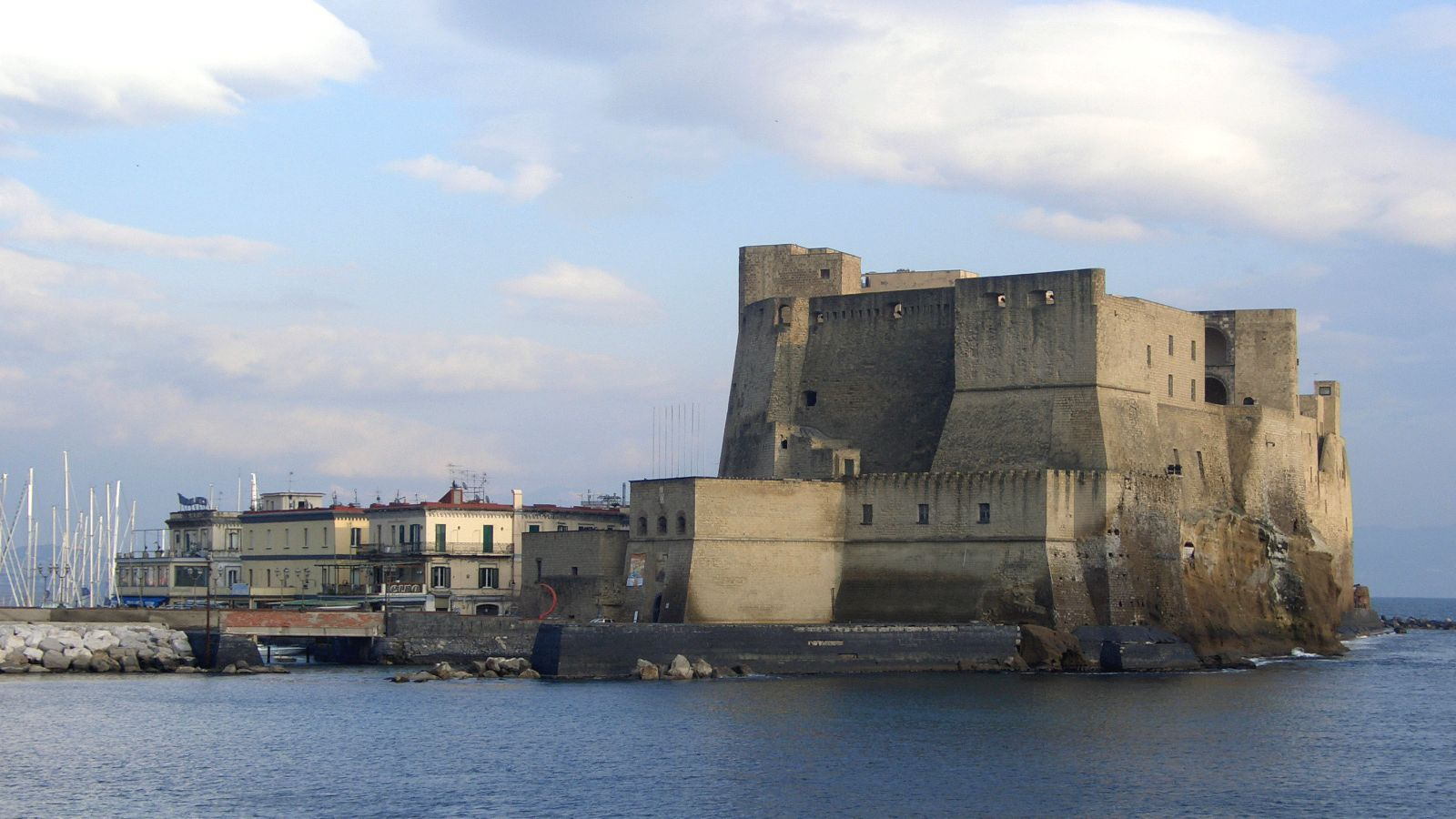
Castel dell'Ovo, where Matilda was imprisoned 1322–1328

Matilda was imprisoned in the island castle Castel dell'Ovo in Naples. Hugh de la Palisse died already in late 1321. In 1324, Matilda's cousin William I, Count of Hainaut offered Robert 100,000 livres for her release, but was ignored. In 1325, King Charles IV of France also attempted to intervene and made a plea on her behalf. This was also ignored by Robert. In 1328, Matilda was transferred from Castel dell'Ovo to the town of Aversa, near Naples.

Matilda died a prisoner in 1331, only 38 years old. Her funeral expenses were paid by Robert and she was buried in his family vault in Naples. Matilda was the last descendant of Geoffrey I of Villehardouin to rule the Principality of Achaea, her deposition in 1321 and death in 1331 marking the final end of her maternal dynasty's lineage and career in Greece. As she died childless despite her many marriages, Matilda upon her deathbed designated her cousin James, the son of her old rival Ferdinand of Majorca, as her heir. As her final political act she thus chose to recognize the lineage of the usurper she had warred against rather than the line of Robert and John of Gravina's family.

== Notes ==
Matilda of Hainaut House of Avesnes Born: November 1293 Died: 1331
Regnal titles
Preceded by Ferdinand	Princess of Achaea; 1316–1321 with Louis	Succeeded by John
