= Margaret of Villehardouin =

Baroness of the 2/3 of Akova

Margaret of Villehardouin (Greek: Μαργαρίτα Βιλλεαρδουίνου; 1266 – February/March 1315) was the Lady of Akova from 1276 until she died and claimant Princess of Achaea from 1312 to 1314 against the Angevins of Naples. She was the daughter of William II of Villehardouin, Prince of Achaea, and his third wife Anna Komnene Doukaina.

== Biography ==
In ca. 1276, her father granted her two thirds (16 knights' fiefs) of the Barony of Akova. After William II's death in 1278, as he had no sons, per the Treaty of Viterbo, the princely title passed to the King of Sicily, Charles of Anjou, the father-in-law of Margaret's elder sister Isabella. Her mother Anna retained only the Villehardouins' patrimonial domain, the Barony of Kalamata, and the fortress of Chlemoutsi, but was forced to give them up in 1282 in exchange for lands elsewhere in Messenia. Margaret remained under her mother's guardianship until Anna's death on 4 January 1286.

In 1304, she claimed from her brother-in-law, Prince Philip of Savoy, one fifth of the Principality of Achaea, but was rebuffed. She repeated her claim, this time for the entire principality, on the death of her sister Isabella in 1312. Margaret's claim rested on her interpretation of the Treaty of Viterbo, which stipulated the creation of such a fief, but only for a male descendant of William II. A later document dated to 1344 also asserts that William had included in his will the stipulation that Margaret would inherit her sister, if the latter died childless, but Isabella had a daughter. In addition, when Charles of Anjou gave the Principality to Isabella in 1289, he explicitly limited her heirs to her own descendants. As J. Longnon commented, her rights on Achaea were "more than doubtful", and her claims were again disregarded by the principality's suzerain, Philip of Taranto, in favour of her niece Matilda of Hainaut and her husband, Louis of Burgundy.

In order to gain support for her claims, in February 1314 Margaret visited Sicily in order to wed her only daughter, Isabella of Sabran to the Infante Ferdinand of Majorca, who, as a landless prince, was eager to claim the princely title of Achaea. Ferdinand was quickly enamoured of Isabella—described by the Catalan chronicler Ramon Muntaner as "the most beautiful creature one could possibly behold" and "the wisest lady in the world"—and the wedding was celebrated at Messina on 14 February 1314 in great pomp. Margaret passed her titles and claims to them, and returned to Achaea in the summer of 1314, where she was imprisoned by the Angevin bailli Nicholas le Maure at the castle of Chlemoutsi, where she died in February or March 1315. Ferdinand invaded Achaea and tried to claim the Principality from Louis of Burgundy, but despite initial success fell in the Battle of Manolada in July 1316, and the remnants of the Majorcan army withdrew soon after.

== Family ==
She married first in September 1294 with Isnard of Sabran and had one daughter, Isabella of Sabran, who married the Ferdinand of Majorca, son of James II of Majorca. Isnard died in 1297. Her second marriage was to Richard II Orsini, Count palatine of Cephalonia and Zakynthos, in 1299. The couple had an unnamed daughter who died as an infant.

== Sources ==
- Bon, Antoine (1969). La Morée franque. Recherches historiques, topographiques et archéologiques sur la principauté d'Achaïe (in French). Paris: De Boccard.
- Longnon, Jean (1949). L'empire latin de Constantinople et la principauté de Morée (in French). Paris: Payot.
