= Ferdinand of Majorca =

Prince of Majorca (1278–1316)

- Born: 1278; Perpignan, Kingdom of Majorca
- Died: 5 July 1316 (aged 37–38); Glarentza, Principality of Achaea
- Spouse: Isabella of Sabran; Isabella of Ibelin
- Issue: James III of Majorca; Ferdinand, viscount of Aumelàs illegitimate Sancho; Fernand; Pagan; Esclaramunda
- House: Barcelona
- Father: James II of Majorca
- Mother: Esclaramunda of Foix

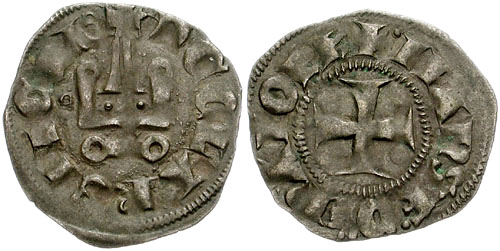
A denarius minted by Ferdinand during his brief rule in Achaea

Ferdinand of Majorca (Catalan: Ferran de Mallorca; 1278 – 5 July 1316) was an infante of the Kingdom of Majorca; he was born at Perpignan, the third son of King James II. He was Viscount of Aumelas and Lord of Frontignan from 1311 and claimed the title of Prince of Achaea from 1315.

He was sent by Frederick III of Sicily to take command of the Catalan Company in Frederick's name, but was rebuffed by Bernat de Rocafort, one of their leaders. On his return with the chronicler Ramón Muntaner, he was captured by the Venetians at Negroponte. He had been released by 1310, when he distinguished himself at the siege of Almería by killing the son of the King of Guadix.

In 1313, he returned to Sicily to take part in the war then in hand with the Angevins and was created Lord of Catania. Margaret of Villehardouin was then in Sicily, seeking to advance her claim to the Principality of Achaea. She gave her daughter Isabella of Sabran to Ferdinand in marriage and resigned Akova and her claim on Achaea to the couple, who were married in Messina. Margaret died in March 1315 in captivity in Chlemoutsi, and her daughter on 7 May 1315 in Catania, shortly after bearing a son, James III of Majorca.

Shortly after her death, Ferdinand set out with a small company for the Morea to uphold the claim now held by his son. He seized Clarenza in June 1315 and briefly took control of the Morea. In the autumn of 1315 he took a second wife, Isabella of Ibelin, daughter of Philip of Ibelin, Seneschal of Cyprus. However, his rival claimant Matilda of Hainaut, and her husband Louis of Burgundy returned to the Morea in the spring of 1316 with Venetian aid. Ferdinand's expected aid from Majorca and Sicily was tardy, as was that of the Catalan Company from Athens. Facing superior numbers, he was killed at the Battle of Manolada, near Glarentza, on 5 July 1316. He was succeeded as heir presumptive of Majorca by his elder son, the future King James III, and as Viscount of Aumelas by his posthumous son, Ferdinand.
