= Treaty of Viterbo =

1267 pair of treaties between Sicily and the Latin Empire

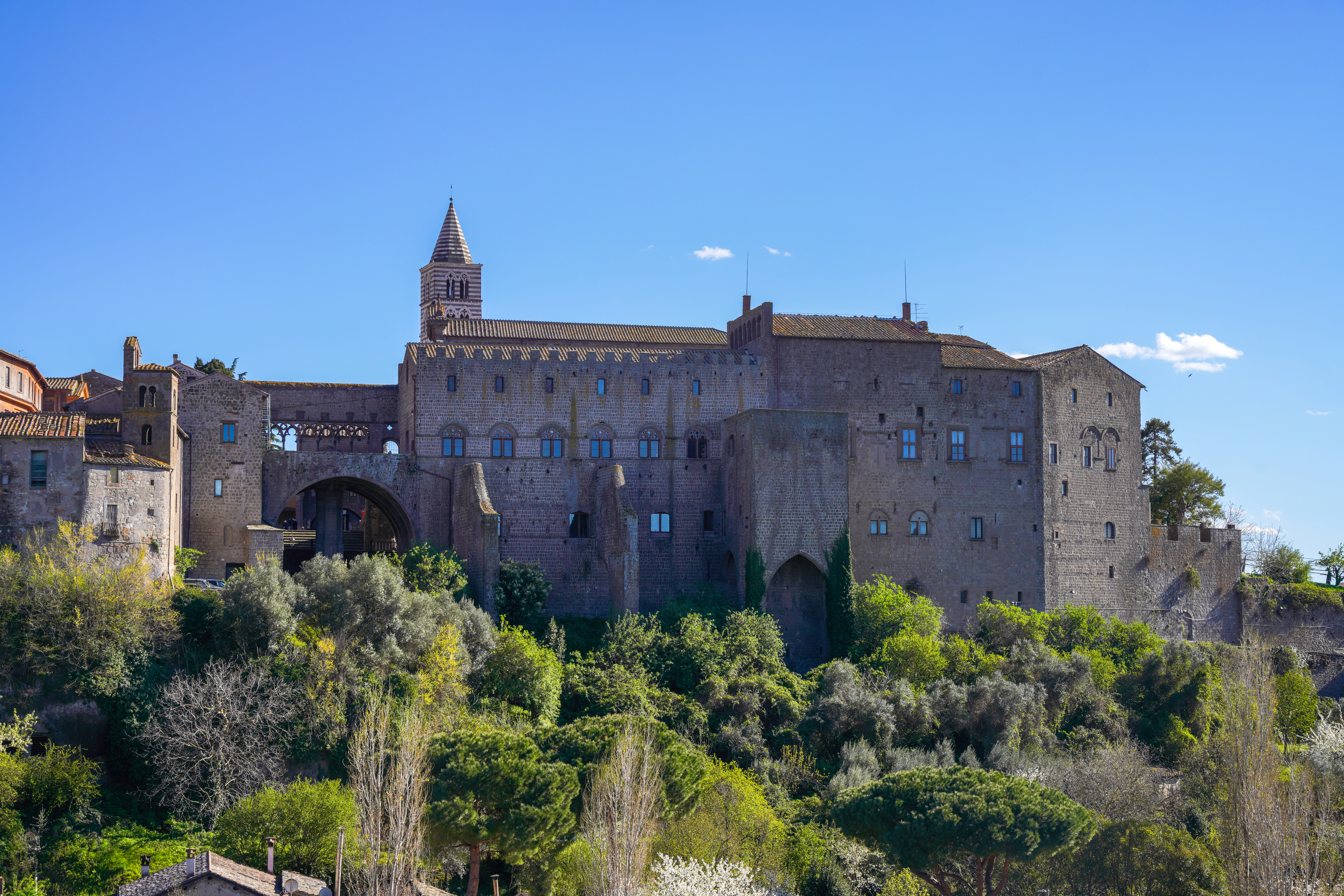

The Treaty of Viterbo (or the Treaties of Viterbo) was a pair of agreements made by Charles I of Sicily with Baldwin II of Constantinople and William II Villehardouin, Prince of Achaea, on 24 and 27 May 1267, which transferred much of the rights to the defunct Latin Empire from Baldwin to Charles.

== Background ==
The recapture of Constantinople by the Greeks in 1261 had sent Baldwin, the Latin Emperor of Constantinople, always impoverished, to seek aid in Western Europe for a crusade to recapture the throne of the Latin Empire for him. For some time, he had expected aid from Manfred of Sicily, who hoped (like his father, Emperor Frederick II) that a crusade might put him in better standing with the Papacy; but Manfred was ousted from Sicily in 1266 by Charles, acting for Pope Clement IV, severely discomfiting Baldwin. Baldwin was residing at the Papal court in Viterbo in 1267 when Clement arranged to reconcile the Emperor and the newly seated King. As the principal vassal of what remained of Baldwin's empire, William was keen to gain an overlord who might be the giver rather than the recipient of subsidy, and who could help defend the Principality against the Despotate of Epirus, which had worsted him in 1259 at the Battle of Pelagonia. His chancellor, Leonardo of Veruli, was sent to Viterbo to negotiate the treaty.

== Provisions ==
The War of the Euboeote Succession (an inheritance dispute between William and the Lombard lords, or "terciers", of Euboea, backed by Venice) and his defeat at Pelagonia had left William's principality exhausted in resources. To obtain the aid of Charles, he was willing to cede Charles the Principality in return for life tenure there. The proposed marriage of William's elder daughter Isabelle with the Byzantine emperor's son Andronikos was to be broken off, and she was to marry Charles' son Philip. Furthermore, Charles would have the reversion of the principality should the couple have no issue, disinheriting Isabelle. William, somewhat reluctantly, agreed to these terms.

The embarrassment of Baldwin, both political and financial, was quite severe, and Charles took advantage of it. Charles was to be confirmed in possession of Corfu and some cities in Albania, once the dowry of Helena of Epirus, and was to be given suzerainty over the Principality of Achaea and Baldwin's rights upon the Aegean islands, excepting Lesbos, Chios, Samos and Kos.

For his part, Charles was to raise and maintain for a year an army of two thousand knights to conquer Constantinople; he would also receive a third of any territory his army reclaimed for the Emperor, other than the city of Constantinople. Finally, a marriage pact with a reversionary clause was agreed upon, like that made with William. Philip of Courtenay, son and heir of Baldwin, was to marry Beatrice of Sicily, second daughter of Charles. The rights of Philip to the Latin Empire would revert to Charles should he die without issue. The agreement was sealed on May 27, 1267.

== Consequences ==
The treaty placed a heavy burden on Baldwin in forcing him to surrender his rights over Achaea (to which the Duchy of Athens was also subject), as it represented the richest part of his empire still in Frankish hands. Nonetheless, the growing power of Charles represented Baldwin's best chance to recover Constantinople, although had the crusade gone forth as planned, he would probably have found himself more ruled than ruler in the presence of Angevin arms. In the event, the launch of the Eighth Crusade delayed any expedition against Constantinople, and Michael VIII Palaeologus, by keeping afoot the project of unifying Greek and Latin Churches, had it put off until 1280. Baldwin had died in 1273, shortly after the nuptials of Philip and Beatrice.

At the eleventh hour, the Sicilian Vespers put an end to all plans for the long-delayed crusade by burning the invasion fleet in Messina harbor. The subsequent war sapped the energy of the Angevins, and Constantinople remained safely beyond their grasp.

The major practical effect of the treaty was to move Achaea into the Angevin orbit, a process accelerated in later years by Charles. Already invested in Albania, the Angevins would now be players in the politics of Frankish Greece until 1387. Unfortunately for them, the succession they had hoped to secure through the marriage pacts and reversionary clauses of the treaty would not go uncontested. When Charles' son Philip of Sicily died in 1271, having had no children by Isabelle, Charles duly claimed Achaea by reversion. However Isabelle, her younger sister, and their heirs would challenge the Angevins for the possession of the principality until 1383.

== Sources ==
- Riley-Smith, Jonathan (2005) [1987]. The Crusades: A History (2 ed.). New Haven, Connecticut: Yale University Press. pp. 222–223. ISBN 0-8264-7270-2.
- Runciman, Steven (1958). The Sicilian Vespers. Cambridge University Press. ISBN 0-521-43774-1.
