= Robert Lee Wolff =

American historian (1915–1980)

Robert Lee Wolff (26 December 1915, New York City – 11 November 1980, Cambridge, Massachusetts) was a Harvard history professor, known for his 1956 book The Balkans in our time and his library collection of English novels of the Victorian period with over 18,000 items.

Wolff received his bachelor's degree (1936) and his master's degree from Harvard University, where he was a teaching fellow from 1937 to 1941, when he left Harvard to join the Office of Strategic Services (O.S.S.). As a leading expert on the Balkans, he was assistant to the director of the Balkans section of the O.S.S. After the end of World War II, Wolff taught for four years at the University of Wisconsin–Madison, and then in 1950 became an associate professor in the Harvard history department. He became a full professor in 1955 and served as the chair of the department from 1960 to 1963. Wolff was elected to the American Academy of Arts and Sciences in 1954 and the American Philosophical Society in 1963. In 1963–1964 Wolff was a Guggenheim fellow. He died of a heart attack in 1980 at the age of 64, while still an active member of the Harvard history department.

Wolff wrote articles, prefaces, and books on history and English literature and was the co-author of three widely used textbooks in high school and undergraduate history courses. His library of English novels of the Victorian period was acquired in the 1980s by the University of Texas at Austin for $2.6 million.

== Works ==
- with Crane Brinton and John B. Christopher:A history of civilization. Prentice-Hall. 1955. (textbook; 2nd edn. 1960; 3rd edn. 1967; 4th edn. 1971; 5th edn. 1976)
- The Balkans in our time. Harvard University Press. 1956. (revised edn. 1974; reprinted in 1978)
- with Crane Brinton and John B. Christopher: Modern civilization: a history of the last five centuries. Prentice-Hall. 1957. (textbook; 2nd edn. 1967; 3rd edn. 1973))
- Golden key: a study in the fiction of George MacDonald. Yale University Press. 1961.
- with Crane Brinton and John B. Christopher: Civilization in the West. Prentice-Hall. 1964. (textbook: 2nd edn. 1969; 3rd edn. 1973; 4th edn. 1981)
- Strange stories and other explorations in Victorian fiction. Boston: Garland Publishing. 1971. ISBN 0876450478.
- Studies in the Latin empire of Constantinople. London: Variorum. 1976. ISBN 0902089994.
- Gains and losses: novels of faith and doubt in Victorian England. NY: Garland Publ. 1977. ISBN 0824016173.
- Sensational Victorian: the life and fiction of Mary Elizabeth Braddon. NY: Garland Publ. 1979. ISBN 0824016181.
- William Carleton, Irish peasant novelist: a preface to his fiction. NY: Garland Publ. 1980. ISBN 0824035275.
- Nineteenth-Century Fiction: A Bibliographical Catalogue based on the Collection formed by Robert Lee Wolff/Compiled by Robert Lee Wolff. Vol. 5 vols. NY: Garland Publ. 1981–1986.
