= Isabella of Sabran =

Majorcan princess, mother of James III (1297–1315)

Isabel of Sabran (1297 – 7 May 1315) was a princess of Majorca.

She was daughter of Isnard of Sabran, Lord of Ansouis, and Margaret of Villehardouin.

Isabel married Ferdinand of Majorca in 1314. She gave birth to the future James III of Majorca on 5 April 1315. She died a month after giving birth.

== Sources ==
- Martínez Ferrando, J. Ernest (1979). "Biografies dels infants reials". La tràgica història dels reis de Mallorca (in Catalan) (2nd ed.). Barcelona: AEDOS. ISBN 8470030590.
- «Isabel de Sabran». L'Enciclopèdia.cat. Barcelona: Grup Enciclopèdia Catalana.
