= Principality of Achaea =

Crusader state in medieval Greece

- 1205–1432/1454
- Coat of arms of the Villehardouin family (first ruling dynasty) Coat of arms of the Zaccaria family (last ruling dynasty)

- The Principality of Achaea and the other Greek and Latin states of southern Greece, c. 1210
- Status: Vassal state*
- Capital: Andravida (1205–1249); Mystras (1249–1261); Aetos (1453–1454)
- Common languages: French officially, Greek popularly, Francograeca dialect
- Religion: Roman Catholic, Greek Orthodox popularly
- Government: Feudal monarchy
- Prince of Achaea
  - 1205–1209: William I
  - 1404–1432: Centurione II
  - 1453–1454: Centurione III
- Historical era: Middle Ages
  - Fourth Crusade: 1204
  - Battle of the Olive Grove of Kountouras: 1205
  - Battle of Pelagonia: 1259
  - Angevin takeover: 1278
  - Dissolved by the Despotate of the Morea: 1432
  - Revival of the last dynasty: 1453
  - Disestablished: 1432/1454
| Preceded by | Succeeded by |
| Byzantine Empire under the Angelos dynasty | Byzantine Empire under the Palaiologos dynasty |
- Today part of: Greece: Peloponnese
- * The principality was a vassal state of, in order, the Kingdom of Thessalonica, then the Latin Emperors at Constantinople, the Angevins of the Kingdom of Naples, until the purchase of 1404 by Centurione II Zaccaria.

The Principality of Achaea (/əˈkiːə/) or Principality of Morea was one of the vassal states of the Latin Empire, which replaced the Byzantine Empire after the capture of Constantinople during the Fourth Crusade. It became a vassal of the Kingdom of Thessalonica, along with the Duchy of Athens, until Thessalonica was captured by Epirus in 1224. After this, Achaea became the dominant power in Greece, lasting continuously for 227 years and cumulatively for 229.

== Foundation ==
Achaea was founded in 1205 by William of Champlitte and Geoffrey I of Villehardouin, who undertook conquering the Peloponnese on behalf of Boniface of Montferrat, King of Thessalonica. With a force of no more than 100 knights and 500 foot soldiers, they took Achaea and Elis, and after defeating the local Greeks in the Battle of the Olive Grove of Koundouros, they became masters of the Morea. The victory was decisive, and after the battle, all resistance from the locals was limited to a few forts that continued to hold out. The fort of Araklovon in Elis was defended by Doxapatres Boutsaras and withstood the attacks until 1213, when the garrison finally surrendered. The fort of Monemvasia, and the castles of Argos, Nauplia and Corinth under Leo Sgouros held out until his suicide in 1208. By 1212, these too had been conquered, and organized as the lordship of Argos and Nauplia, and only Monemvasia continued to hold out until 1248. William of Champlitte ruled Achaea until he departed for France to assume an inheritance, but died on the way there in 1209. He was succeeded by Geoffrey I of Villehardouin, who ruled until his own death in 1219.

== Organization of the Principality ==
=== Territorial organization and feudal structure ===
Map of the Peloponnese with its principal locations during the late Middle Ages

Achaea was rather small, consisting of the Peloponnese peninsula (then known as the Morea), but it was fairly wealthy, exporting wine, raisins, wax, honey, oil and silk. The capital of the principality was originally at Andravida. It was bordered on the north by Epirus and the Duchy of Athens and surrounded by Venetian-held territories in the Aegean Sea, including the forts of Modon and Coron on the Peloponnese.

In 1208/9, after Champlitte's departure, William I created a commission, composed of two Latin bishops, two bannerets and five Greek magnates and chaired by himself, to assess the land and divide it, according to Latin practice, in fiefs. The resulting register was presented at a parliament held at the princely residence at Andravida, and divided the country into twelve baronies, mostly centred around a newly constructed castle—a testament to the fact that the Franks were a military elite amidst a potentially hostile Greek population. The twelve temporal barons were joined by seven ecclesiastic lords, headed by the Latin Archbishop of Patras. Each of the latter was granted a number of estates as knightly fiefs, with the Archbishop receiving eight, the other bishops four each, and likewise four granted to each of the military orders: the Templars, Hospitallers and the Teutonic Knights. The twelve secular baronies were:

| Barony | Fiefs | Territory | First holder |
|---|---|---|---|
| Akova (Mattegrifon) | 24 | Arcadia | Walter of Rosières |
| Karytaina (Chabron) | 22 | Skorta | Renaud of Briel |
| Patras | 24 | N. Achaea | William Aleman |
| Passavant (Passava) | 4 | Mani Peninsula | John of Nully |
| Vostitsa | 8 | E. Achaea | Hugh I of Charpigny |
| Kalavryta | 12 | SE. Achaea | Otho of Tournay |
| Chalandritsa | 4 (later 8) | S. Achaea | Audebert of la Trémouille |
| Veligosti | 4 | S. Arcadia | Matthew of Mons |
| Nikli | 6 | S. Arcadia | William of Morlay |
| Geraki | 6 | E. Laconia | Guy of Nivelet |
| Gritzena | 4 | SE. Messenia | Luke |
| Kalamata | - | S. Messenia | William I of Villehardouin |

Shortly after 1260, a thirteenth barony, that of Arcadia (modern Kyparissia) was established, which was also a personal fief of the Villehardouins. Aside from Kalamata (and later Arcadia), which became the Villehardouins' personal fief, the Prince's own domain encompassed the region of Elis, where the capital Andravida, the port of Glarentza (Clarence) and the fortress of Chlemoutsi (Clermont) were situated, Corinthia, with the Acrocorinth as the chief site, as well as most of Messenia and Laconia around the fertile valley of Eurotas. When Tsakonia and the other mountainous regions of the southeast were subdued in the late 1240s, these too came under the Prince's control.

The twelve barons retained considerable powers and privileges, so that the Prince was not an absolute sovereign but rather a "first among equals" among them. Thus they had the right to construct a castle without the Prince's permission, or to decree capital punishment. Since Salic Law was not adopted in Achaea, women could also inherit the fiefs. The high secular and ecclesiastic lords formed the High Court (la Haute Court) of the principality, presided over by the Prince, which acted as the Prince's advisory council and judged affairs pertaining to feudal law. In addition, a Lower Court (la Court de la Borgesie) is mentioned, which abjudicated in matters of common law.

On the other hand, all vassals owed the Prince four months service in the field and four months garrison duty every year, retiring after the age of sixty, but only if a replacement could be provided. This put the principality on constant war footing. Indeed, the knights of Achaea enjoyed a considerable reputation both in the Levant and in Western Europe.

With the Byzantine recovery of the region around Mystras after 1261, however, the rapid extinction of the original families and the expansion of Achaean influence across Frankish Greece, the initial organization of the Principate changed. By the time the principality's laws, the Assizes of Romania, were codified in the 1330s, the peers of the Prince were: the Duke of Athens, the Duke of Naxos, the Triarchs of Negroponte, the Margrave of Bodonitza, the Count palatine of Cephalonia and Zakynthos, the barons of Patras, Matagrifon and Kalavryta, as well as the marshal of the principality.

=== Government and administration ===
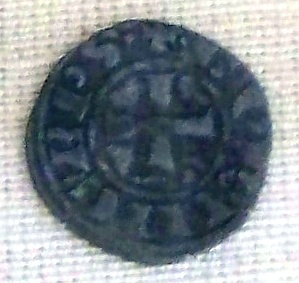
Achaean tornese from Glarentza (Clarentia)

The most important secular and ecclesiastical lords participated in the council of the "Grand Court", which was presided over by the Prince. The council had great authority, and its decisions were binding for the Prince. The Principality's higher officials were the chancellor, the Prince's chief minister, the marshal, the constable, the treasurer, the protovestiarius, in charge of the Prince's personal treasury, and the pourveur des chastiaux, who was responsible for the replenishment of the castles.

The Principality also produced a unique set of laws, the Assizes of Romania, which combined aspects of Byzantine and French law, and became the basis for the laws of the other Crusader states. Several Byzantine titles such as logothetes and protovestarius continued in use, although these titles were adapted to fit the conceptions of Western feudalism. The Byzantine pronoia system was also adapted to fit Western feudalism; peasants (paroikoi) technically owned their land, but military duties and taxes that they had not been subject to under the pronoia system were imposed on them by their new French lords.

The Frankish barons were subjected to heavy military obligations. They had to serve four months each year with the Principality's army and further four months of guard duty on various castles. They could not leave the Principality, except with the Prince's permission, and even then had to return within two years and two days or have their property confiscated.

== The Principality in the 13th century ==
Geoffrey I was succeeded (1209) by his son Geoffrey II, who ruled until his death in 1245. By confiscating the ecclesiastical taxes, in the years 1221–1223 he built himself a powerful castle at Chlemoutsi, near modern Kyllini, which he used as his main residence. Because of this, he came into conflict with the Catholic Church, and was briefly excommunicated by the Pope. When John III of Nicaea besieged Constantinople in 1236, Geoffrey II came to the aid of the Latin Empire with 100 knights, 800 archers and 6 vessels.

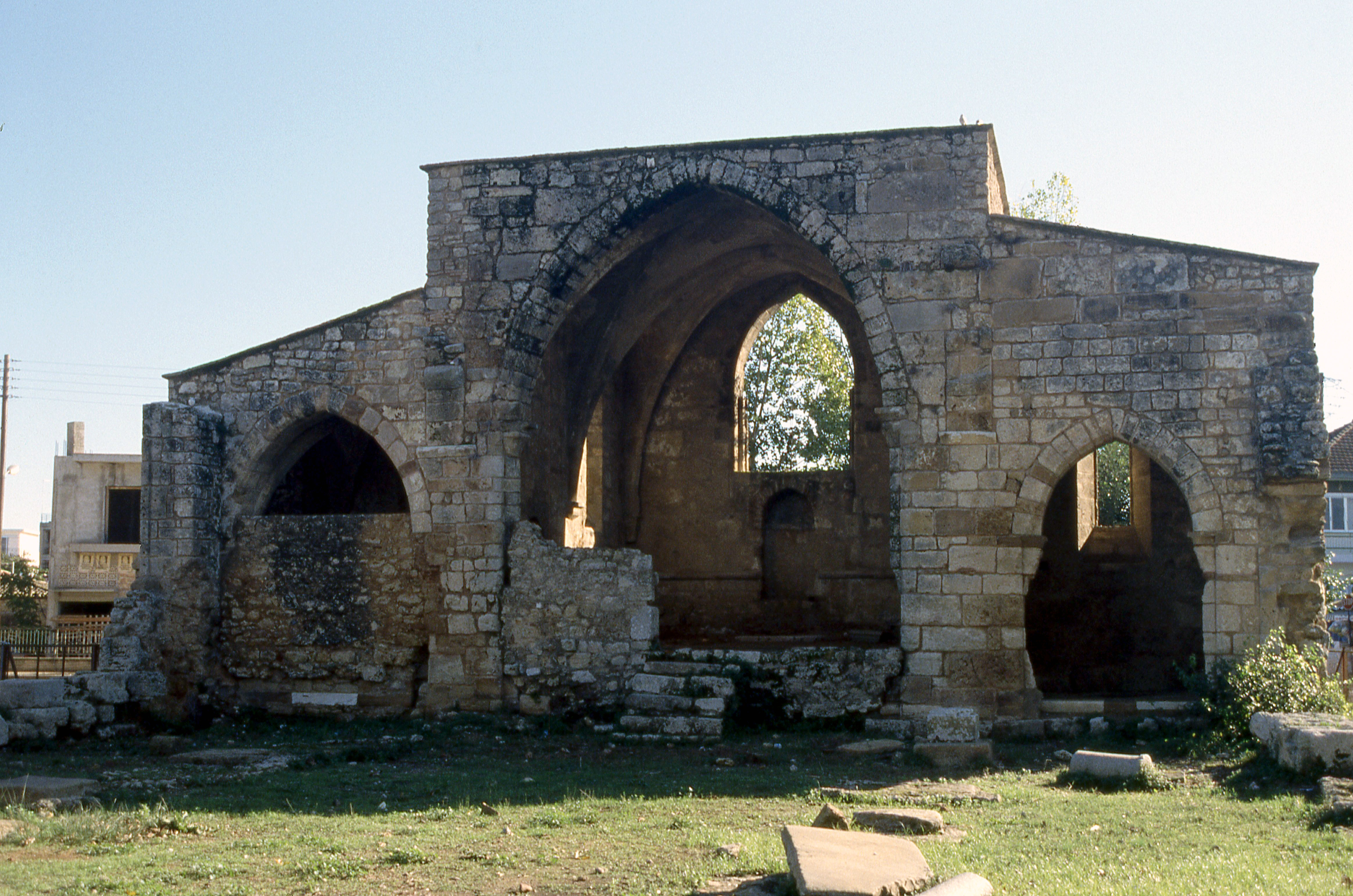
Ruins of the 13th-century St. Sophia church in Andravida

Under his son and successor, Prince William II Villehardouin (ruled 1245–1278), the Principality reached its zenith. William was a poet and troubadour, and his court had its own mint at Glarentza, and a flourishing literary culture, using a distinct form of spoken French. In 1249, William II moved the capital of Achaea to the newly built fortress of Mistra, near ancient Sparta. In 1255 he became embroiled in the War of the Euboeote Succession, and in 1259 he allied with Michael II, despot of Epirus, against Michael VIII Palaeologus of Nicaea. However, Michael II then deserted to join the Nicaean side, and William was taken prisoner at the Battle of Pelagonia. After Michael recaptured Constantinople in 1261, William was released in 1262 in return for Mistra and much of Laconia, which became a Byzantine province (the nucleus of the future Despotate of the Morea), as well as an oath of allegiance to the Emperor.

However, soon after his release, William broke his oath of allegiance, and begun seeking alliances with and help from various Western nations. Informed by the local Byzantine governor of William's actions, Michael VIII sent an army under the command of his half-brother, Constantine, against William, but the expedition was unsuccessful, the Byzantines first being routed at the Battle of Prinitza in 1263 and then, after Constantine's return to Constantinople, suffering a heavy defeat at the Battle of Makryplagi in 1264.

Map of the Greek and Latin states in southern Greece ca. 1278

Despite his successes at Prinitza and Makryplagi, the war with the Byzantines had taken a toll on Achaean resources, and their empire remained a looming threat. A proposal to marry William's elder daughter Isabella to Andronikos, eldest son of Michael VIII, was strongly opposed by the Achaean nobility, who had no desire to come under Byzantine rule. Both William and his overlord Baldwin II, now dispossessed of Constantinople, had hoped for aid from King Manfred of Sicily, who had sent troops to aid William at Pelagonia. But Manfred fell under Papal sanction and was killed in 1266, when Charles of Anjou conquered his kingdom. Charles was now ascendant in Italy, and William and Baldwin came to terms with him in the Treaty of Viterbo (1267). In return for the military aid and funds they so greatly needed, Charles obtained the suzerainty over Achaea from Baldwin, and the Principality itself from William. The latter was to retain the Principality for life, and it was to pass to his daughter, Isabella, who was to marry one of Charles' sons.

These were hard terms, essentially detaching Achaea from the Latin Empire and making it a dependency of the Kingdom of Sicily. Nonetheless, William fulfilled his obligations, leading an Achaean force to aid Charles against the invasion of Conradin at the Battle of Tagliacozzo (1268), and bringing Isabelle to Italy to marry Charles' son Philip in 1271. The military support of Charles allowed William to resist the Byzantines, and the last years of his reign were relatively quiet.

However, after the death of William in 1278, the seeds of a calamitous succession dispute were laid. In the normal course of events, Achaea would have passed to a cadet branch of the House of Anjou. However, his son-in-law Philip had died in 1277 without an heir, and a reversionary clause in the Treaty of Viterbo provided that the Principality would go to Charles of Anjou, rather than Isabelle, should this occur. Charles duly took possession of the Principality, which he ruled through a series of bailiffs; he would never personally visit it.

A renewed commitment by Charles to retake the Latin Empire (Treaty of Orvieto, 1281) was forestalled by the War of the Sicilian Vespers, and this struggle with the Crown of Aragon consumed the remainder of his life. His son Charles II succeeded him in Achaea as well as Sicily (now reduced to the Kingdom of Naples), but was a prisoner in Aragonese hands. In the interim, the rule of Achaea devolved upon a series of bailiffs chosen from the Morean nobility. Not long after his release and coronation in 1289, he granted the Principality to Isabelle of Villehardouin upon her marriage with Florent of Hainaut, in part to redress the grasping application of the Treaty of Viterbo at William's death. However, he retained feudal overlordship over the Principality, and his grant provided that neither Isabelle nor any daughter who was her heir might marry without his consent.

== The feudal conflict of the Morea (1307–1383) and last decades of the principality ==
For this period the principality was under a violent succession dispute, which originated from the dispossessed Latin Emperor Baldwin II's gift of the overlordship of Achaea to Charles I of Sicily, in return for support in his attempt to reconquer the throne in Constantinople. This was an action which ignored the rights of the Villehardouin Princes of Achaea. The Angevin kings of Naples subsequently gave Achaea as their fief to a series of their own relatives who fought against Princess Margaret of Villehardouin and her heirs.

Map of the southern Balkans and western Anatolia in 1410. The Principality of Achaea under Centurione II Zaccaria was by then reduced to the western Morea.

Charles II of Naples had at first granted Achaea to Princess Isabella of Villehardouin (of the Villehardouin dynasty), but he deposed her and her consort Philip I of Piedmont in 1307, stripping them of their rights and granting it to his son Philip I of Taranto, who in 1313 transferred it to Matilda (or Mafalda, or Maud) of Hainaut, heiress of Isabella of Villehardouin, who was married to Louis of Burgundy, titular King of Thessalonica. But Margaret, younger daughter of William II Villehardouin, claimed her rights from 1307. In 1313 she claimed them again without success and then transferred her rights to her daughter Isabelle of Sabran, wife of Ferdinand of Majorca. The son of Ferdinand and Isabelle, known as James the Unfortunate, was proclaimed prince of the Morea in 1315 under the regency of his father, who conquered the principality between 1315 and 1316 but was defeated and executed by Louis of Burgundy and Matilda in 1316. In 1316 Louis of Burgundy died and King Robert of Naples deposed Matilda and gave the principality to his brother John of Durazzo, to whom Matilda was briefly married under duress before being imprisoned.

From 1331 the feudal lords began to recognize the rights of James, and in 1333 the recognition was total. Then John transferred his rights to his sister-in-law, Catherine of Valois, titular Empress of Constantinople, wife of Philip I of Taranto, whose stepson Robert claimed her rights until 1346 when she died. The claim was then issued by the son of Philip and Catherine, Philip II of Taranto. In 1349, James was succeeded by his son James IV (II of the Morea). In 1364 Robert of Taranto, stepson of Catherine and eldest surviving son of Philip I of Taranto, died. In 1373 Philip II transferred his rights to his cousin, overlord and former sister-in-law Queen Joan I of Naples, whose third husband James IV of Majorca, when he died in 1375, left her his own claim to the principality, at which point she became more or less the uncontested Princess of Achaea. However, when Joan was imprisoned in Naples in 1381, another, much younger, James, James of Baux, grandson of Catherine and nephew of Philip II, who in 1374 had become titular Emperor of Constantinople, used the opportunity and seized Achaea. In 1383, Achaea was annexed by Charles III of Naples, successor and murderer of Queen Joan of Naples, who was the grandson of John of Durazzo, and James of Baux was driven away. In 1383 the Vicary government began, lasting until 1396, under the Durazzo kings of Naples.

In 1404, Ladislaus, King of Naples, sold the princely rights to Centurione II Zaccaria, the lord of Arkadia (modern Kyparissia). Centurione ruled until 1430, when the Despots of the Morea, Constantine Palaiologos and Thomas Palaiologos, conquered the heartland of the Principality in Achaea. Centurione was forced to marry off his daughter, Catherine, to Thomas and to constitute her his heiress. He retreated to his ancestral Messenian castle. Upon his death in 1432, this too was seized by the Byzantines.

Upon the start of the great Morean revolt in 1453, John Asen Zaccaria, Centurione's son from his marriage to a scion of the Asen branch of the Palaiologos family, revived the principality and was proclaimed Prince of Achaea by the Latins of Morea, with additional support from the Greek and Albanian rebels. He was recognised as the legitimate ruler of Morea by King Alfonso of Naples and by the Doge of Venice whom congratulated him as "Prince Centurione III." However, by late 1454, he was defeated by the Turkish allies of Thomas and fled to Modon, and then to Italy. In his exile in Rome, the Popes recognised John as the titular Prince of Achaea and offered him a symbolic pension.

The Byzantine reconquest proved short-lived, however, as in 1460, the Ottomans conquered the Despotate.

== In fiction ==
- Lord Geoffrey's Fancy (first published 1962, Bello Publishing, ISBN 1447232259). One of the last books by British historical novelist Alfred Duggan, this covers events in the Morea and the Duchy of Athens during the period 1257–1272. It is told from the perspective of an English knight who follows Geoffrey of Briel, a real person who held the Barony of Karytaina. Duggan was an archaeologist and historian; key facts are taken from the Chronicle of the Morea then fleshed out but it is as accurate as any historical reconstruction can be.
- Princess Isabeau (Πριγκιπέσσα Ιζαμπώ), a novel by the Greek writer Angelos Terzakis about Princess Isabella, originally serialized in the Kathimerini newspaper in 1937–38.

== Family relations of the Princes of Achaea ==
Family relations of the Princes of Achaea

Geoffrey I of Villehardouin prince of Achaea ∞ Elisabeth (of Chappes?)
Charles I of Capet-Anjou king of Sicily | Geoffrey II prince of Achaea ∞ Agnes of Courtenay | William II prince of Achaea ∞1.anna Angelina; 2.Carintana dalle Carceri
Charles II king of Naples | 1.Philip prince of Sicily, I as prince of Achaea | Isabella of Villehardouin princess of Achaea ∞2.Florent of Hainaut; 3.Philip I of Savoy-Piedmont | Margaret of Villehardouin claimant ∞1.Isnard de Sabran; 2.Richard Orsini count palatine of Cephallonia
Philip I prince of Taranto, II as prince of Achaea ∞2.Catherine of Valois-Courtenay | 3.John, Duke of Durazzo; Count of Gravina, prince of Taranto | (2) Matilda of Hainaut princess of Achaea ∞1,Guy II de la Roche; 2.Louis of Burgundy; 4.Hugh de La Palice | Isabella of Sabran claimant ∞ Ferdinand of Barcelona prince of Majorca
Margaret of Taranto ∞Francis of Baux duke of Andria | Robert prince of Taranto, prince of Achaea ∞Marie I de Bourbon | Louis prince of Taranto | Philip II prince of Taranto, III as prince of Achaea | Louis count of Gravina | James III king of Majorca claimant
James of Baux prince of Achaea ∞ Agnes of Durazzo | Joanna I queen of Naples, princess of Achaea | Charles III king of Naples, prince of Achaea | James IV king of Majorca claimant | Isabella of Majorca ∞ John II, Marquis of Montferrat; HOUSE OF PALAIOLOGOS
Ladislaus king of Naples, prince of Achae sold Achaea to Pedro | Pedro de San Superano prince of Achaea | Maria II Zaccaria princess of Achaea | Andronikos Zaccaria baron of Arkadia ∞ Catherine Le Maure
Centurione Zaccaria prince of Achaea ∞ Lady Asenina Palaiologina
Catherine Zaccaria ∞ Thomas Palaiologos despot of Morea; HOUSE OF PALAIOLOGOS | John Asen Zaccaria prince of Achaea ∞Magdalene Tocco

== See also ==
- Greece in the Roman era
- Byzantine Greece

== Sources ==
- Bon, Antoine (1969). La Morée franque. Recherches historiques, topographiques et archéologiques sur la principauté d'Achaïe [The Frankish Morea. Historical, Topographic and Archaeological Studies on the Principality of Achaea] (in French). Paris: De Boccard.
- Dourou-Iliopoulou, Maria (2005). Το Φραγκικό Πριγκιπάτο της Αχαΐας (1204–1432). Ιστορία. Οργάνωση. Κοινωνία. [The Frankish Principality of Achaea (1204–1432). History. Organization. Society.] (in Greek). Thessaloniki: Vanias Publications. ISBN 978-960-288-153-8.
- Fine, John V. A. (1994) [1987]. The Late Medieval Balkans: A Critical Survey from the Late Twelfth Century to the Ottoman Conquest. Ann Arbor, Michigan: University of Michigan Press. ISBN 978-0-472-10079-8.
- Finley Jr, John H. "Corinth in the Middle Ages." Speculum, Vol. 7, No. 4. (Oct., 1932), pp. 477–499.
- Longnon, Jean (1949). L'empire latin de Constantinople et la principauté de Morée (in French). Paris: Payot.
- Longnon, Jean (1969) [1962]. "The Frankish States in Greece, 1204–1311". In Setton, Kenneth M.; Wolff, Robert Lee; Hazard, Harry W. (eds.). A History of the Crusades, Volume II: The Later Crusades, 1189–1311. Vol. 2 (Second ed.). Madison, Milwaukee, and London: University of Wisconsin Press. pp. 234–275. ISBN 0-299-04844-6.
- Miller, William (1908). The Latins in the Levant: A History of Frankish Greece (1204–1566). London: John Murray.
- Miller, William (1921). Essays on the Latin Orient. Cambridge: Cambridge University Press.
- Tozer, H. F. "The Franks in the Peloponnese." The Journal of Hellenic Studies, Vol. 4. (1883), pp. 165–236.
- Bartusis, M.C., The Late Byzantine Army (University of Pennsylvania Press, 1997) ISBN 978-0-8122-1620-2
- Hooper, N. & Bennett, M., The Cambridge Illustrated Atlas of Warfare (Cambridge University Press, 1996) ISBN 978-0-521-44049-3
- Setton, Kenneth M. (1976). The Papacy and the Levant (1204–1571), Volume I: The Thirteenth and Fourteenth Centuries. Vol. 1. Philadelphia: The American Philosophical Society. ISBN 0-87169-114-0.
- Stornaiolo Silva, Ugo Stefano (2024). Achaean Disputes: Eight Centuries of Succession Conflicts for the Title of Prince of Achaea. Covington, LA & Boerne, TX, USA: Libertas Press. ISBN 978-1600200052
- Topping, Peter (1975). "The Morea, 1311–1364". In Setton, Kenneth M.; Hazard, Harry W. (eds.). A History of the Crusades, Volume III: The Fourteenth and Fifteenth Centuries. Vol. 3. Madison and London: University of Wisconsin Press. pp. 104–140. ISBN 0-299-06670-3.
- Topping, Peter (1975). "The Morea, 1364–1460". In Setton, Kenneth M.; Hazard, Harry W. (eds.). A History of the Crusades, Volume III: The Fourteenth and Fifteenth Centuries. Vol. 3. Madison and London: University of Wisconsin Press. pp. 141–166. ISBN 0-299-06670-3.
