= Isabella of Villehardouin =

Princess of Achaea (1289-1307)

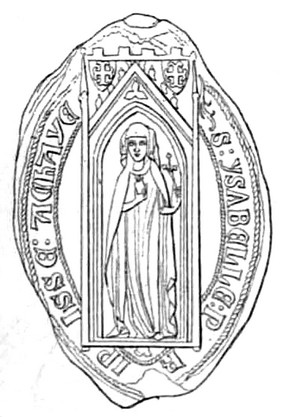

Princess of Achaea
- Reign: 16 September 1289 – 5 May 1306
- Predecessor: Charles II
- Successor: Philip of Savoy
- Co-rulers: Florent of Hainaut (1289–1297); Philip of Savoy (1301–1306)
- Born: c. 1260/1263
- Died: 23 January 1312
- Spouse: Philip of Sicily (m. 1271; died 1277) Florent of Hainaut (m. 1289; died 1297) Philip of Savoy, Lord of Piedmont (m. 1301)
- Issue: Matilda of Hainaut; Mary of Savoy; Alice of Savoy; Margaret of Savoy
- House: Villehardouin
- Father: William II of Villehardouin
- Mother: Anna Komnene Doukaina
- Religion: Catholicism

Isabella of Villehardouin (1260/1263 – 23 January 1312) was the reigning Princess of Achaea from 1289 to 1307. She was the elder daughter of Prince William II of Achaea and of his third wife, Anna Komnene Doukaina, the second daughter of Michael II Komnenos Doukas, the despot of Epiros.

== First marriage ==
On 28 May 1271 Isabella married Philip of Sicily, son of Charles I of Sicily. This marriage had been pre-determined by the Treaty of Viterbo in May 1267 between Charles, the exiled Baldwin II of Constantinople and Isabella's father. Taking advantage of the precarious situation of the remains of the Latin Empire in the face of renascent Greek power, Charles gained suzerain rights over Achaea; furthermore, the heirs of Baldwin and William were to marry children of Charles, and Charles was to have the reversion of both the empire and the principality should the couples have no heirs.

Philip became titular King of Thessalonica in 1274, but he died on 1 January 1277, predeceasing his father. In line with the treaty, on the death of Isabella's father William, in 1278, it was her father-in-law Charles who succeeded to the throne of Achaea.

== Remarriage and reign ==
Charles I died in 1285, to be succeeded by his son Charles II. In 1289, on Isabella's marriage to Florent of Hainaut, Charles II conferred on the couple the Principality of Achaea, on the condition that, if she survived her husband, Isabella would not remarry without Charles II's consent. Florent and Isabella had a daughter, Matilda.

As Prince, Florent negotiated the Treaty of Glarentsa with the Byzantine Empire in 1290. The peace lasted until 1293, when the Greeks retook Kalamata; Florent's emissaries, however, persuaded Andronikos II Palaiologos to return it. In 1296, the Greeks retook the castle of Saint George in Arcadia. Florent laid siege to it, but died in 1298 before it could be taken.

Isabella was married again in Rome on 12 February 1301. They had three daughters, Mary, Alice and Margaret. Her third husband was Philip of Savoy, Lord of Piedmont, who now became prince of Achaea in his turn. Philip aimed to reconquer the whole of Lacedaemonia from the Byzantine Empire. He was an authoritarian ruler and this put him at odds with the barons of his realm. He tried to placate the barons of Morea, but was forced to accept a parliament in 1304. The Greek peasantry, crushed by taxes, then revolted in turn. In 1306 Philip and Isabella were summoned to Charles II's court at Naples. Philip was accused of disloyalty and failure to support Charles in a campaign against Epirus, and Isabella of failing to seek her suzerain's consent before marrying Philip. Charles deprived the two of Achaea and on 5 May 1306 bestowed it directly upon his son Philip I of Taranto.

== Later life ==
Philip of Savoy eventually relinquished his claim to Achaea on 11 May 1307 in exchange for the County of Alba. Isabella separated from him and went to live in Hainaut, continuing to assert her right to the principality. Isabella died on 23 January 1312, after which Philip of Savoy remarried. On Philip of Taranto's death in 1313, Isabella's daughter by Florent, Matilda of Hainaut, became Princess of Achaea.

Her life was the inspiration for Princess Isabeau (Πριγκιπέσσα Ιζαμπώ), a novel by the Greek writer Angelos Terzakis, originally serialized in the Kathimerini newspaper in 1937–38.

== Sources ==
- Bon, Antoine (1969). La Morée franque. Recherches historiques, topographiques et archéologiques sur la principauté d'Achaïe [The Frankish Morea. Historical, Topographic and Archaeological Studies on the Principality of Achaea] (in French). Paris: De Boccard.
- Lock, Peter (1995). The Franks in the Aegean, 1204-1500. Longman. ISBN 0-582-05139-8.
- Nicol, Donald M. (1984). The Despotate of Epiros, 1267-1479: A Contribution to the History of Greece in the Middle Ages. Cambridge University Press. ISBN 978-0-521-13089-9.
- Longnon, Jean (1969) [1962]. "The Frankish States in Greece, 1204–1311". In Setton, Kenneth M.; Wolff, Robert Lee; Hazard, Harry W. (eds.). A History of the Crusades, Volume II: The Later Crusades, 1189–1311. Vol. 2 (Second ed.). Madison, Milwaukee, and London: University of Wisconsin Press. pp. 234–275. ISBN 0-299-04844-6.

Regnal titles
Preceded by Charles II	Princess of Achaea; 1289–1307; With: Florent and Philip I	Succeeded by Philip II
