= Berthold II von Katzenelnbogen =

13th-century German nobleman

Berthold II von Katzenelnbogen (fl. 1199–1217) was a German nobleman of the family of the Counts of Katzenelnbogen (Note: Also spelled Katzenellenbogen.) and a participant in the Fourth Crusade (1202–04), who became lord of Velestino (c.1205–17) and regent of the Kingdom of Thessalonica (c.1217) in Frankish Greece. (Note: "Frankish" here is a generic historiographic term referring to the Crusaders. Frankish Greece was known to Western European contemporaries as Romania, the rump of the eastern Roman empire that had fallen to the Crusaders.) He was a patron of poets and in politics a Ghibelline. (Note: "Ghibelline" here means a supporter of the Staufer candidate for the imperial throne, Philip, against the Welf candidate, Otto.)

== Fourth Crusade ==
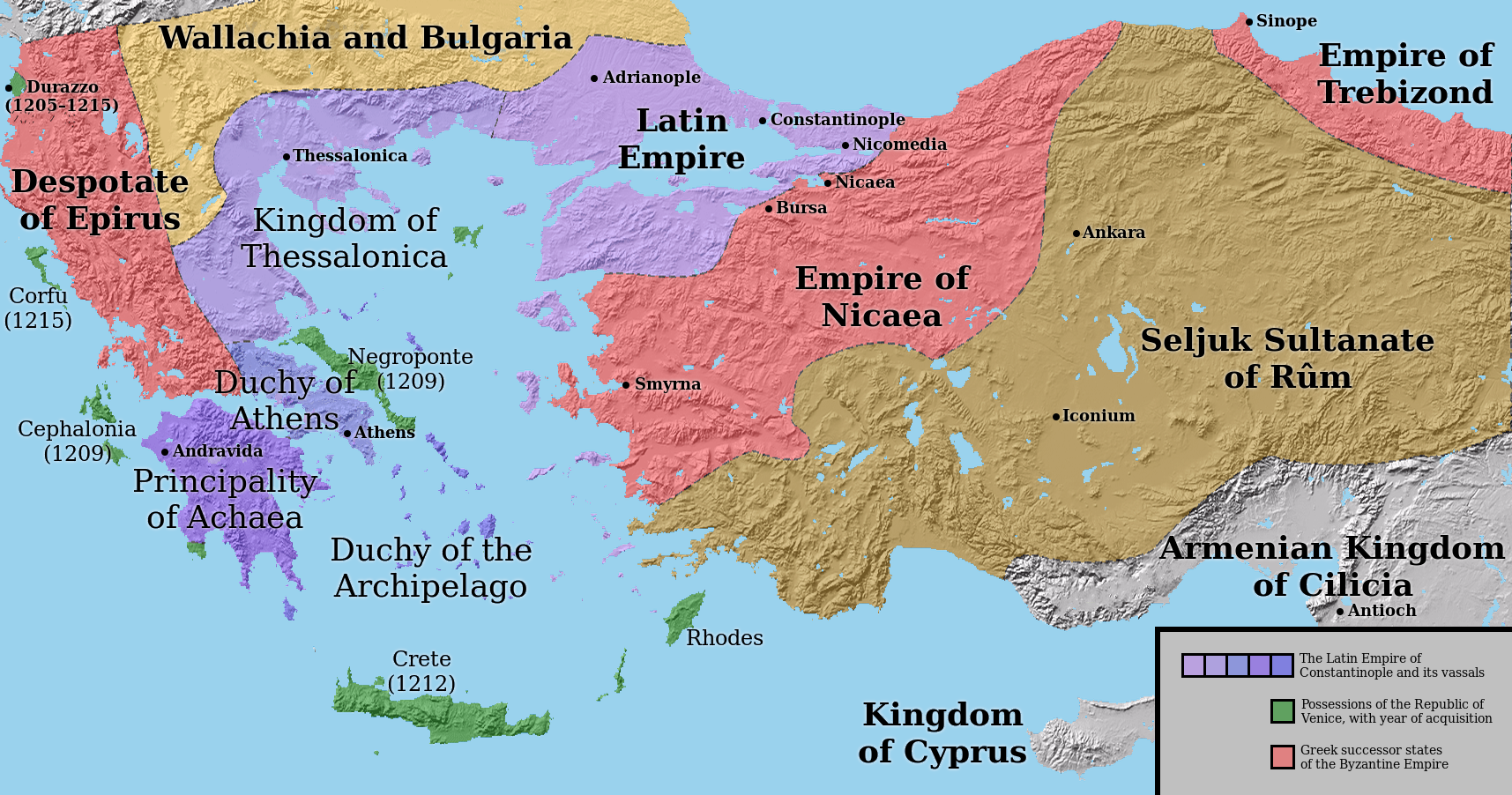
The principalities of Frankish Greece and the Greek successor states after the Fourth Crusade (c.1210)

Born sometime before 1183, Berthold was the son of Berthold I of Katzenelnbogen and nephew of the powerful bishop of Münster, Hermann II (1173–1202). Berthold joined the court of his uncle, and is attested as being with him at Worms in February 1199, after Hermann had joined the court of King Philip of Germany. Disappointed with the political disunity and civil war in the Holy Roman Empire (Note: The Holy Roman Empire comprised three kingdoms—Germany, Burgundy and northern Italy—and its ruler was king of all three; he was not emperor, however, until being crowned by the pope.) in the aftermath of Philip's 1198 election as king, Berthold joined the Fourth Crusade in 1202. He arrived at the Crusader camp after the Crusaders had besieged and captured Zara (Zadar) in Hungary. Like most of the German contingent, he was placed under the command of the Marquis Boniface of Montferrat, with whom he developed a close personal relationship. In 1203, when the Crusader army reached Constantinople, capital of the Byzantine Empire, the German contingent was under the overall command of Henry of Flanders, with whom Berthold developed a good relationship. On 12 April 1204, after the breach of Constantinople by the Crusaders, a certain German count (quidam comes theothonicus), possibly Berthold, set fire to a section of the city in order to force the defending Byzantines to retire.

After the fall of the Byzantine Empire, Count Baldwin IX of Flanders was proclaimed the new Latin Emperor. This offended Boniface, who considered himself a superior candidate, and he briefly rebelled against the new emperor. Berthold supported Boniface in his brief revolt, and after Boniface was placated with a new Kingdom of Thessalonica, Berthold accompanied Boniface in his conquest of Greece (1204–05). He was rewarded with a lordship centred on the town of Velestino in the province of Vlachia (provintia Velechative), with the title "Lord of Velestino" (dominus de Valestino). In 1205, he was sent by Pope Innocent III to a diplomatic mission in Asia Minor to mediate in a dispute between King Leo II of Armenia and Prince Bohemond IV of Antioch. After that he may have gone on to the Kingdom of Jerusalem. A certain count Berthold the German (Note: Latin comes Bertoldus Theutonicus.) is mentioned in documents of 1206 and 1207 in the entourage of John of Ibelin, regent of the kingdom, but this may have been Count Berthold of Nimburg.

== Defence of the Kingdom of Thessalonica ==
Berthold returned to Greece in 1207 or 1208. In the meantime, Boniface of Montferrat had been killed fighting against the Bulgarians, and had left his underage son Demetrius as his heir, with the latter's mother, Margaret of Hungary, as regent and Count Oberto II of Biandrate as guardian (baiulus) of the kingdom. In 1208–09, the kingdom's barons, rejecting the suzerainty of the emperor, now Henry of Flanders, rose against the regent in the so-called "Lombard Rebellion". Led by Oberto, the rebels intended to depose Demetrius and install his elder half-brother, William VI of Montferrat, as king. During the uprising, Berthold loyally supported the emperor and was named as castellan of Serres. After the emperor arrested Oberto, he handed him over to Berthold, who held him imprisoned in Serres. Berthold supported Boniface's policy of maintaining good relations with the Byzantine aristocracy, as against the preferred policy of the rebels, which was to favour Lombards in the government. Berthold even patronised the family of Petraliphas, giving the monastery of Saint Hilarion near Halmyros to Maria Petraliphaina.

In 1209, Berthold attended the first Parliament of Ravennika. On 2 May 1210, he signed the concordat with the church reached at the second Parliament of Ravennika. It appears that around this time the Emperor Henry appointed him imperial guardian or regent of the kingdom, balivus imperatoris, to replace Oberto. Berthold was certainly in charge of the defence of the kingdom, along with the emperor's nephew, Eustace of Flanders. He defeated an attack by Strez, nephew of the Bulgarian tsar Kaloyan, on the plains of Pelagonia, near Monastir. In 1211, he defeated Kaloyan's successor and Strez's rival, Tsar Boril of Bulgaria, and caused him heavy losses. A letter of the emperor mentioning these victories is dated 12 January 1212. In 1213, the emperor refers to Berthold as merely one of his barons in the kingdom of Thessalonica, implying that he was not at that time guardian or regent. (Note: Van Tricht has suggested that the actual regent in the period 1210–11 was Rainerio of Travale.)

== Regent of the kingdom ==
Berthold had a close relationship with Margaret of Hungary. In 1211, however, the Latin archbishop of Heraclea Perinthus complained to Pope Innocent III that Berthold forcefully kept Margaret in his possession, and that he had misappropriated lands belonging to the church of Hagia Sophia in Thessalonica. Berthold received correspondence from Innocent regarding the Latin Church in Thessalonica. In July 1210, Innocent wrote asking him to restore the possessions of the diocese of Larissa and Gardiki. On 4 August 1211, he was reproached for his occupation of lands belonging to Hagia Sophia. In 1212, the pope asked Berthold to intervene on behalf of the diocese of Gardiki in its dispute with the Knights Hospitaller. The wording of these papal letters has engendered confusion over whether Berthold was himself the "imperial bailiff" (balivus imperatoris) the pope was addressing or else merely the lord of Velestino.

Berthold is explicitly mentioned as regent—baiulus regni Thessalonicensis (Note: English "bailiff of the kingdom of Thessalonica".)— only once: in a letter of 21 April 1217 from Pope Honorius III, notifying him of his appointment of Giovanni Colonna as papal legate to Thessalonica. This is also the last sure reference to Berthold; he is not mentioned in any other contemporary source after this. A late source says that he visited Acre in the Kingdom of Jerusalem later that year and from there returned to Germany. Around 1220, Berthold's nephew and heir, Count Diether IV, visited Thessalonica, perhaps to see his uncle or else claim his inheritance.

== Sources ==
- Longnon, Jean (1978). Les compagnons de Villehardouin: Recherches sur les croisés de la quatrième croisade. Geneva: Librairie Droz.
- Miller, William (1908). The Latins in the Levant: A History of Frankish Greece (1204–1566). London: John Murray.
- Setton, Kenneth M. (1976). The Papacy and the Levant (1204–1571), Volume I: The Thirteenth and Fourteenth Centuries. Vol. 1. Philadelphia: The American Philosophical Society. ISBN 0-87169-114-0.
- Todt, Klaus-Peter (2006). "Graf Berthold II. von Katzenelnbogen (vor 1183 – nach 1217) im ägäischen Raum und im Nahen Osten". Nassauische Annalen (in German). 117: 65–87.
- Van Tricht, Filip (2011). The Latin Renovatio of Byzantium: The Empire of Constantinople (1204–1228). Leiden: Brill. ISBN 978-90-04-20323-5.
