= 1209 =

1209 in various calendars
- Gregorian calendar: 1209; MCCIX
- Ab urbe condita: 1962
- Armenian calendar: 658; ԹՎ ՈԾԸ
- Assyrian calendar: 5959
- Balinese saka calendar: 1130–1131
- Bengali calendar: 615–616
- Berber calendar: 2159
- English Regnal year: 10 Joh. 1 – 11 Joh. 1
- Buddhist calendar: 1753
- Burmese calendar: 571
- Byzantine calendar: 6717–6718
- Chinese calendar: 戊辰年 (Earth Dragon); 3906 or 3699 — to — 己巳年 (Earth Snake); 3907 or 3700
- Coptic calendar: 925–926
- Discordian calendar: 2375
- Ethiopian calendar: 1201–1202
- Hebrew calendar: 4969–4970
- Hindu calendars
- Vikram Samvat: 1265–1266
- Shaka Samvat: 1130–1131
- Kali Yuga: 4309–4310
- Holocene calendar: 11209
- Igbo calendar: 209–210
- Iranian calendar: 587–588
- Islamic calendar: 605–606
- Japanese calendar: Jōgen 3 (承元３年)
- Javanese calendar: 1117–1118
- Julian calendar: 1209; MCCIX
- Korean calendar: 3542
- Minguo calendar: 703 before ROC 民前703年
- Nanakshahi calendar: −259
- Thai solar calendar: 1751–1752
- Tibetan calendar: ས་ཕོ་འབྲུག་ལོ་ (male Earth-Dragon); 1335 or 954 or 182 — to — ས་མོ་སྦྲུལ་ལོ་ (female Earth-Snake); 1336 or 955 or 183

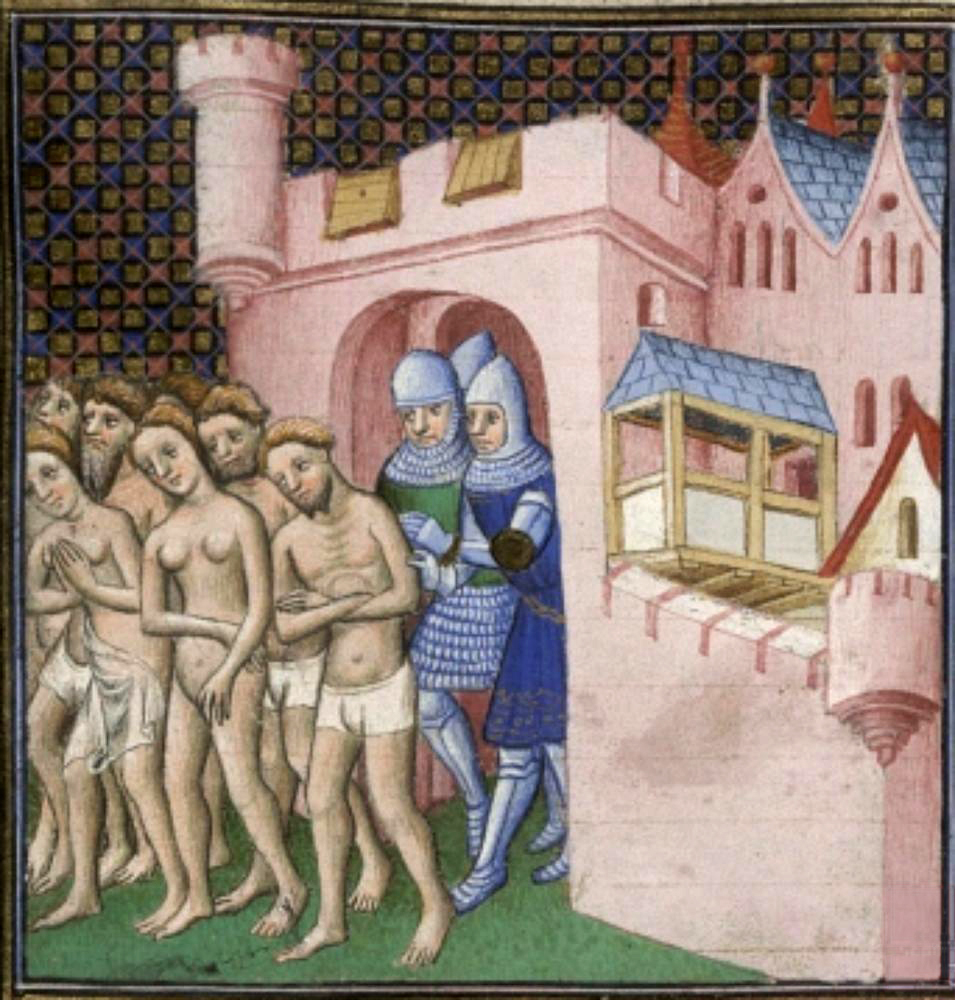
The Crusaders expel the Cathars from Carcassonne (miniature from Grandes Chroniques de France, c. 1415).

Year 1209 (MCCIX) was a common year starting on Thursday of the Julian calendar. It was the 1209th year of the Common Era (CE) and Anno Domini (AD) designations, the 209th year of the 2nd millennium, the 9th year of the 13th century, and the 10th and last year of the 1200s decade.

== Events ==
=== By place ===
==== Europe ====
- May – The First Parliament of Ravennika, convened by Emperor Henry of Flanders, is held in the town of Ravennika in Greece, in an attempt to resolve the rebellion of the Lombard nobles of the Kingdom of Thessalonica. Henry pardons Lord Amédée Pofey (or Buffois), and reinvests with his fief, while the other nobles persist in their rebellion and keep to their castles. After receiving imperial recognition, Geoffrey I of Villehardouin becomes Henry's vassal, thereby subordinating Achaea directly to Constantinople.
- June – Treaty of Sapienza: The Republic of Venice recognizes the possession of the Peloponnese by Geoffrey I of Villehardouin and keeps only the fortresses of Modon and Coron. Venice also acquires an exemption of her merchants from all tariffs, and the right to establish "a church, a market and a court" in every city of Achaea.
- July 22 – Massacre at Béziers: The Crusader army, led by Simon de Monfort, arrives in the Languedoc area, and makes camp at Béziers, to start a siege. The citizens, believing that their city walls are impregnable, harass the Crusaders, by sending a group of soldiers (supported by armed civilians) to launch a sortie against their camp. When they are forced to retreat, the Crusaders storm the walls (which are not properly manned) and enter the gate, sacking and killing some 20,000 Cathars and Catholics alike.
- August 15 – Siege of Carcassonne: Simon de Montfort takes Carcassonne, after negotiating the city's surrender with Raymond Roger Trencavel (or Raimond), viscount of Béziers and Albi, who is imprisoned and dies in mysterious circumstances 3 months later in his own dungeon. The Cathars are allowed to leave and expelled with nothing more than their clothes.

==== Britain ====
- November – Against the backdrop of the continuing Papal Interdict of 1208, John, King of England, is excommunicated by Pope Innocent III. Despite the excommunication, John will continue to make amends to the Church – including giving alms to the poor whenever he defiles a holy day by hunting during it. He feeds 100 paupers to make up for when he "went into the woods on the feast of St. Mary Magdalen", and three years from now, he will feast 450 paupers "because the king went to take cranes, and he took nine, for each of which he feasted fifty paupers."
- Black Monday, Dublin: A group of 500 recently arrived settlers from Bristol are massacred by warriors of the Irish O'Byrne clan. The group (accompanied by women and children) leaves the safety of the walled city of Dublin to celebrate Easter Monday near a wood at Ranelagh, and are attacked without warning. Although a relatively obscure event in history, it is commemorated by a mustering of the Mayor, Sheriffs, and soldiers on the day, as a challenge to the native tribes for centuries afterwards.
- London Bridge is completed by a stone-arched structure. On the bridge are houses built; this is for paying the maintenance, though it has to be supplemented by other rents and by tolls.

==== Asia ====
- Spring – The Mongols led by Genghis Khan begin their first invasion against the Western Xia state (or Xi Xia). They push up along the Yellow River, capturing several garrisons and defeating an imperial army. The Mongols besiege the capital Zhongxing – which holds a well-fortified garrison of some 70,000 men (hastily reinforced with another 50,000). Genghis lacks the proper equipment and experience to take the city. In October, an attempt to flood the city by diverting the Yellow River is disastrous and floods the Mongol camp, forcing the Mongols to withdraw.
- Tamar, queen of Georgia, raids Eastern Anatolia and seizes Kars. She leads a liberational war in southern Armenia.

=== By topic ===
==== Education ====
- In England, an exodus of scholars from Oxford leads to foundation of the University of Cambridge.

==== Markets ====
- King Philip II of France ("Augustus") grants a "conduit" to merchants, going to the Champagne fairs (a trade fair organized in different towns of the County of Champagne), guaranteeing the safety of their travel – as any attempt made against them – is now to be considered a crime of lèse-majesté (an offense against the king). The decision increases again the appeal of the fairs to merchants from Italy and the Low Countries.
- In Tuscany, the banking firm known as the Gran Tavola ("Great Table") is formed; most of the partners are members of the Bonsignori family.

==== Religion ====
- February 24 – The Franciscan Order is founded by the Italian priest Francis of Assisi. He and 11 of his followers journey to Rome where he receives approval of his rule from Pope Innocent III. Franciscan friars can not own any possessions of any kind. They wander and preach among the people, helping the poor and the sick. They support themselves by working and by begging for food, but they are forbidden to accept money either for work or as alms. The Franciscans work at first in Umbria and then in the rest of Italy. The impact of these street preachers and especially of their founder is immense, so that within 10 years they number some 5,000 followers.
- October 21 – Innocent III crowns Otto IV as emperor of the Holy Roman Empire in St. Peter's Basilica at Rome.

== Births ==
- January 5 – Richard of Cornwall, English nobleman (d. 1272)
- January 11 – Möngke Khan, Mongol emperor (khagan) (d. 1259)
- June 25 – Fujiwara no Shunshi, Japanese empress (d. 1233)
- September 8 – Sancho II ("the Pious"), king of Portugal (d. 1248)
- December 7 – Vasilko Konstantinovich, Kievan prince (d. 1238)
- Bettisia Gozzadini, Italian female scholar and jurist (d. 1261)
- Choe Hang, Korean general and dictator (d. 1257)
- Gilbert of Preston, English Chief Justice (d. 1274)
- Haji Bektash Veli, Persian philosopher (d. 1271)
- Princess Kuniko (or Hoshi), Japanese empress (d. 1283)
- Roger Bigod, 4th Earl of Norfolk, English nobleman and knight (d. 1270)
- Shang Ting, Chinese calligrapher and poet (d. 1288)
- Valdemar the Young, king of Denmark (d. 1231)
- Walter Marshal, 5th Earl of Pembroke, English nobleman and knight (possible date) (d. 1245)
- Xu Heng, Chinese official and philosopher (d. 1281)

== Deaths ==
- January 10 – William of Donjeon, French archbishop (b. 1140)
- January 13 – Matilda of Saxony, German noblewoman (b. 1172)
- February 2 – Alfonso II, Count of Provence ("Berenguer"), Spanish nobleman and knight (b. 1180)
- March 7 – Otto VIII, count palatine of Bavaria (approximate date)
- April 2 – Elisabeth of Greater Poland, Duchess of Bohemia, Polish princess (b. 1152)
- May 16 – Ji Gong (or Daoji), Chinese Buddhist monk (b. 1130)
- September 12 – Fujiwara no Kinshi (Go-Shirakawa), Japanese empress (b. 1134)
- November 10 – Raymond Roger Trencavel, French nobleman (b. 1185)
- November 12 – Phillipe de Plessis, French Grand Master (b. 1165)
- Albrecht von Johansdorf, German minnesänger (approximate date)
- Arnold of Altena, German nobleman and knight (b. 1166)
- Berenguier de Palazol (or Palou), Spanish troubadour
- Gaucelm Faidit, French troubadour (approximate date)
- John of Hexham, English monk and chronicler (b. 1160)
- Margaret of Sweden, queen consort of Norway (b. 1155)
- Nizami Ganjavi, Persian mystic poet and writer (b. 1141)
- Petrus Riga, French priest and poet (approximate date)
- Rigord, French monk and chronicler (approximate date)
- Ruzbihan Baqli, Persian Sufi master and poet (b. 1128)
- Walter Map, English diplomat and historian (b. 1140)
