= Rainerio of Travale =

Rainerio (or Renier) of Travale (Italian: Ranieri da Travale, Latin: Rainerius de Traval) was an Italian soldier of the Fourth Crusade (1202–1204) who became the chancellor of the Kingdom of Thessalonica.

A native of Travale in Tuscany, he possessed several castles in the region, among them Elci, Giuncarico, Montalbano and Montingegnoli. In Greece, he acquired a fief in the diocese of Kitros. With Albertino of Canossa and Pietro Vento, he was part of the council of the regent of Thessalonica, Oberto of Biandrate, that received the ambassadors of the Latin emperor Henry. He participated in the Second Parliament of Ravennika, where he supported Biandrate, and was one of ten barons of Thessalonica who signed the concluding convention of 2 May 1210.

In the aftermath of Henry's invasion of Thessalonica in 1209–1210, Rainerio entered imperial service. He was made administrator of Zetounion and Ravennika, territories taken from the Knights Templar by the emperor. He was back in Italy by 1222, when he gave his castles over to Siena to finance his return to Greece. In return he was made a citizen of the Republic of Siena. He probably returned to Greece in the expedition of Demetrius of Thessalonica and William VI of Montferrat in 1225, which ended in failure.

== Bibliography ==
- Adams, John (1787). A Defence of the Constitutions of Government of the United States of America. Vol. 2. London.
- Longnon, J. (1978). Les compagnons de Villehardouin: Recherches sur les croisés de la quatrième croisade. Librairie Droz.
- Van Tricht, Filip (2011). The Latin Renovatio of Byzantium: The Empire of Constantinople (1204–1228). Leiden: Brill. ISBN 978-90-04-20323-5.
