= Parliament of Ravennika =

Two parliaments took place in the city Ravennika in Central Greece in 1209 and 1210, organized by the Latin Emperor Henry of Flanders:

- Parliament of Ravennika (1209)
- Parliament of Ravennika (1210)
