= Othon de la Roche =

First Duke of Athens

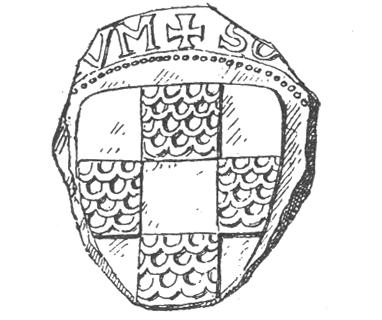
Seal of Othon de la Roche

Othon de la Roche, also Otho de la Roche (died before 1234), was a Burgundian nobleman of the De la Roche family from La Roche-sur-l'Ognon. He joined the Fourth Crusade and became the first Frankish Lord of Athens in 1204. In addition to Athens, he acquired Thebes by around 1211.

== Early life ==
The chronicler Alberic of Trois-Fontaines writes that Othon was the son of "a certain noble Pons of La Roche in Burgundy". The identification of La Roche is uncertain, because Burgundy may refer either to the Free County or to the Duchy of Burgundy. La Roche-sur-l'Ognon, a hamlet by Rigney in the Free County, is the most probable candidate, because of its proximity to Flagey, Venise and other domains of Othon's family.

Othon confirmed his forefathers' donations to the Charlieu Abbey in 1195. He was with the Fourth Crusade on its arrival before the walls of Constantinople in 1203. At that time, he was a member of the "sixth division" of the crusading army, which "was formed by the people of Burgundy", according to the chronicler Geoffrey of Villehardouin. The crusaders captured Constantinople on 12 April 1204. They started the conquest of the Byzantine Empire under the command of Baldwin IX of Flanders who was elected the first Latin Emperor of Constantinople on 9 May.

The distribution of the conquered lands gave rise to conflicts among the commanders of the crusaders. Boniface of Montferrat—one of the most influential leaders of the Crusade—even laid siege to Adrianople, a town recently captured by Emperor Baldwin. In order to reach an agreement, the crusaders' other commanders initiated negotiations with Boniface. Villehardouin writes that Othon de la Roche was one of the four "chief counsellors" of Boniface during the discussions.

An agreement on the distribution of the Byzantine Empire was reached in October 1204. Boniface of Montferrat's claim to the western regions of the Byzantine Empire was tacitly acknowledged. He went on to conquer Thessaly, Boeotia and Attica in November, granting these regions to his commanders. To Othon de la Roche, he gave Athens. It is possible that Othon also received Thebes from Boniface, although Jean Longnon has argued that Boniface granted Thebes to Albertino and Rolandino of Canossa after the conquest.

== Lord of Athens ==
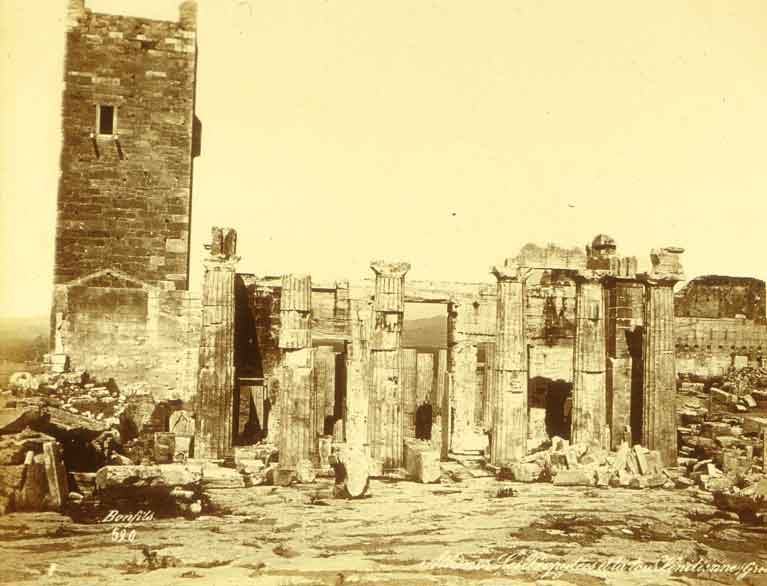
The Frankish Tower (left) of the Acropolis of Athens, built most probably under Othon's auspices, in 1875, the same year it was destroyed

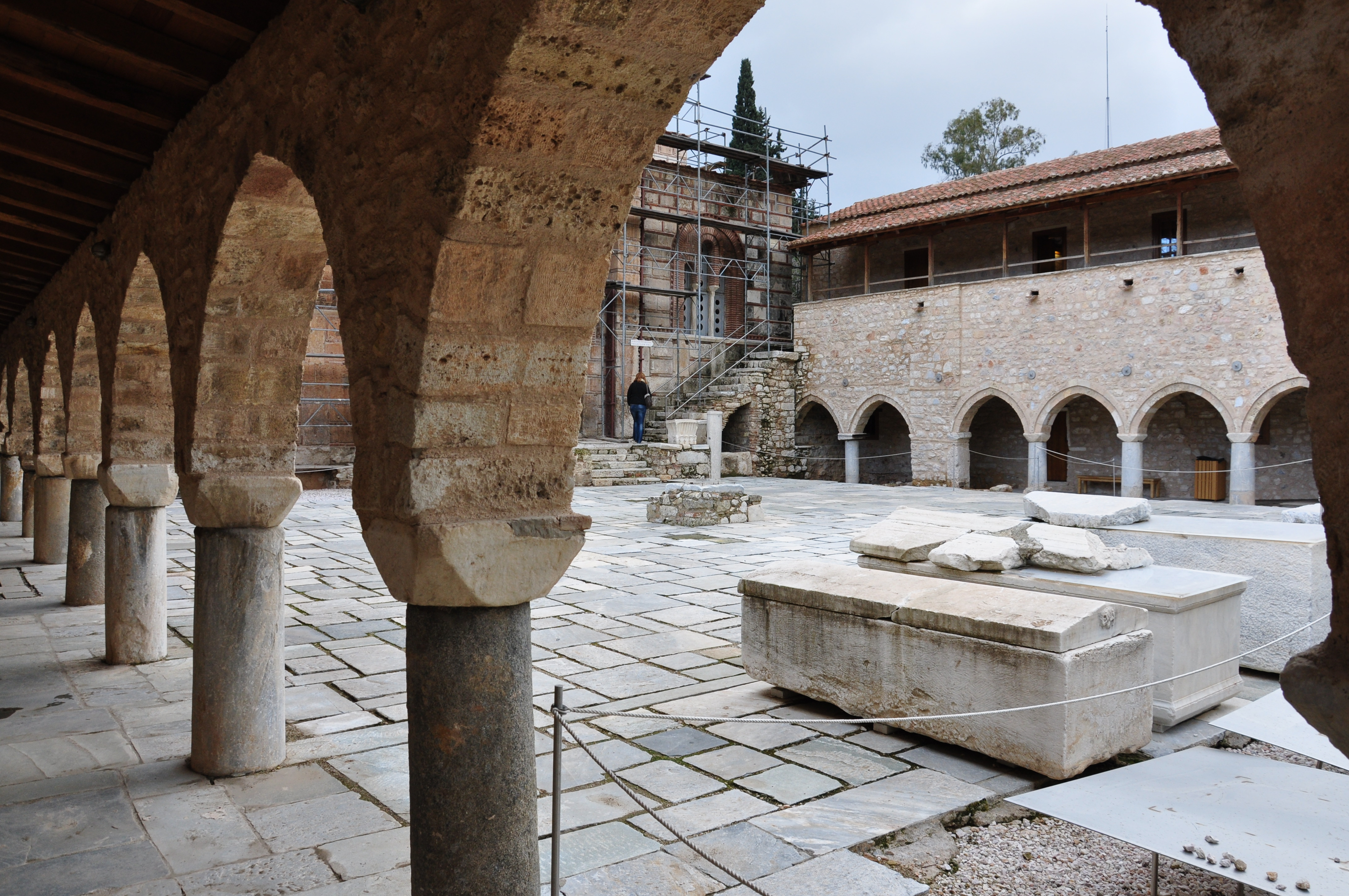
The cloister of Daphni Monastery, where Cistercian monks from Burgundy were settled by Othon in about 1207

Othon took the title of Megaskyr (μεγασκύρ) or "Grand Lord" in Athens. There is uncertainty about when and how or even if he acquired the title "Duke" (dux). The traditional account, found in the Chronicle of the Morea, states that it was first officially bestowed by King Louis IX of France around 1259 to Othon's successor, Guy I de la Roche. The title does appear in some pre-1260 documents, including a letter of Pope Innocent III from July 1208, which refers to Othon as Duke, although the papal chancery generally preferred "Lord".

The Acropolis of Athens was fortified in Othon's reign. According to Longnon, following the specialist Antoine Bon, Othon had a square tower erected by the main entrance of the citadel. Othon seems to have supported the development of the Latin Church in his domains. Pope Innocent III confirmed on 27 November 1206 that Berard, the first Catholic Archbishop of Athens succeeded his Orthodox predecessor, Michael Choniates. Othon had good relations with the Cistercian Bellevaux Abbey in his native Burgundy. He established some monks from Bellevaux at Daphni Monastery in his Greek domains in about 1207. A portico in the Burgundian style still evokes their memory.

After the sudden death of Othon's overlord, Boniface of Montferrat, in September 1207, many of Boniface's former vassals started to plot against the new Latin Emperor, Henry of Flanders. Othon remained loyal to the Emperor, a stance which "may have cost him Thebes" (if he already possessed it), as Albertino of Canossa was in possession of the citadel of this town in this period.

Othon married his wife Isabelle in late 1208. Othon's first conflict with the Church was recorded around the same time: he forced Archbishop Berard to renounce the right to appoint the treasurer of the Athens Cathedral on his behalf. Pope Innocent III authorized the Archbishop of Larissa to investigate the case.

Emperor Henry called his first of two parliaments at Ravennika and Othon made an appearance to demonstrate his loyalty to his suzerain in the first days of May 1209. The Emperor captured Thebes from Albertino of Canossa on 8 May and visited Athens, where Othon received him with great respect. Even so, historian Jean Longnon writes that Othon never recognised Henry as his direct overlord and remained loyal to Boniface of Montferrat's successor, King Demetrius of Thessalonica, until the end of the Kingdom of Thessalonica in 1224. Likewise uncertain is whether Othon received Thebes from Emperor Henry in 1209, or whether the town was not granted to him prior to 1211.

On 2 May 1210, at the second parliament of Ravennika, Othon ratified the pact between church and state, signing as "Othon de la Roche, lord of Athens" (Otto de Roccha, dominus Athenarum). However, he did little to effect it. He was accused of treating the Greek priests as serfs, since many of them were former serfs raised to their clerical status by Greek prelates desiring to lift the heavy burden the Franks could impose with their corvées on the local populace.

With Geoffrey, Othon embarked on a series of military adventures to consolidate mainland Greece. Together they took Acrocorinth (1210), Argos and Nauplia (1212). In compensation, he received two lordships in the Argolid: Argos and Nauplia and Damala. According to Marino Sanudo Torsello, he acquired the kommerkion (a right to tax commerce) of Corinth as well. The city of Thebes itself became Othon's capital and the economic centre of his domains, due to its silk industry. Athens itself remained Othon's residence. There he lived in his castle atop the Acropolis.

Between 1208 and 1213 there was a steady stream of correspondence between Othon and Pope Innocent, because the Latin clergy of Attica made frequent complaints about Othon's conduct. In 1214 he gave the castle of Livadeia to the pope and received it back as a fief in exchange for an annual tribute. Between 1217 and 1225 he also kept a correspondence with Pope Honorius III. In response to the grievances of the Athenian clergy, Honorius excommunicated him and placed his domains under interdict. About 1223, Othon came to an agreement with the pope by which he returned church lands, but kept church furnishings at the cost of an annual indemnity. A quota, proportional to the population of the community, was also placed on the number priests per parish.

In 1217 and 1221 he also granted Bellevaux the right to the catch of the fisheries of La Roche and Ray on set dates of the year.

Othon ceases to be mentioned after 1225, when he is commonly held to have resigned the Duchy of Athens to his son Guy I and returned home to Burgundy with his wife, although this is unsubstantiated. He died sometime before 1234, since in that year his other son Othon II of Ray called himself "a son of the former lord Othon, duke of Athens" (filius quondam domini Ottonis, ducis Athenarum).

== Family ==
Othon's wife name was Isabel (and its variant Elisabeth). She is generally described as the daughter and heiress of Guy, lord of Ray-sur-Saône in the Free County of Burgundy. According to Longnon however, she was the daughter of Clarembaud IV of Chappes, a lord from Champagne. She gave birth to two sons, Guy and Othon. Othon inherited the lordship of Ray. Guy is traditionally held to have inherited La Roche, while the duchy is said to have passed to a nephew of Othon's also named Guy. Longnon has challenged this view according to a chart in which Othon of Ray, son of Othon de la Roche, presents the duke Guy as his brother - meaning that Guy would be Othon's son and not his nephew. While most members of the La Roche family lived in the Free County of Burgundy, some of them settled in Athens. For instance, a great-grandson of his, Walter, was a member of the Chapter of the Parthenon in 1292.

== Sources ==
- Fine, John V. A. (1994) [1987]. The Late Medieval Balkans: A Critical Survey from the Late Twelfth Century to the Ottoman Conquest. Ann Arbor, Michigan: University of Michigan Press. ISBN 978-0-472-10079-8.
- Lock, Peter (1995). The Franks in the Aegean (1204–1500). Longman. ISBN 0-582-05139-8.
- Longnon, Jean (1946). "Problèmes de l'histoire de la principauté de Morée". Journal des savants (in French). 2 (2): 77–93. doi:10.3406/jds.1946.2495.
- Longnon, Jean (1969) [1962]. "The Frankish States in Greece, 1204–1311". In Setton, Kenneth M.; Wolff, Robert Lee; Hazard, Harry W. (eds.). A History of the Crusades, Volume II: The Later Crusades, 1189–1311. Vol. 2 (Second ed.). Madison, Milwaukee, and London: University of Wisconsin Press. pp. 234–275. ISBN 0-299-04844-6.
- Longnon, Jean (1973). "Les premiers ducs d'Athènes et leur famille". Journal des savants (in French). 1 (1): 61–80. doi:10.3406/jds.1973.1278. ISSN 1775-383X.
- Longnon, Jean (1978). Les compagnons de Villehardouin: Recherches sur les croisés de la quatrième croisade. Librairie Droz.
- Lurier, Harold E., ed. (1964). "Crusaders as Conquerors: The Chronicle of Morea". New York: Columbia University Press.
- Runciman, Steven (1989). A History of the Crusades, Volume III: The Kingdom of Acre and the Later Crusades. Cambridge University Press. ISBN 0-521-06163-6.
- Setton, Kenneth M. (1946). "A Note on Michael Choniates, Archbishop of Athens (1182–1204)". Speculum. 21 (2): 234–36. doi:10.2307/2851321. JSTOR 2851321. S2CID 163531377.
- Setton, Kenneth M. (1976). The Papacy and the Levant (1204–1571), Volume I: The Thirteenth and Fourteenth Centuries. Vol. 1. Philadelphia: The American Philosophical Society. ISBN 0-87169-114-0.
- Villehardouin, Geoffroy de (2007). "Villehardouin's Chronicle of the Fourth Crusade and the Conquest of Constantinople". In Shaw, Margaret R. B. (ed.). Chronicles of the Crusades: Villehardouin and Joinville. Dovers Publications. ISBN 978-0486454368.

New title	Duke of Athens; 1208–1225/34	Succeeded by Guy I de la Roche
New title	Lord of Argos and Nauplia; 1212–1225/34	Succeeded by Othon V de la Roche
Preceded by Guy of Ray	Lord of Ray until 1225/34	Succeeded by Othon V de la Roche
