= Parliament of Ravennika (1210) =

The Second Parliament of Ravennika was convened in May 1210 by Latin Emperor Henry of Flanders in the town of Ravennika in Central Greece in order to resolve the differences between the princes of Frankish Greece and the Roman Catholic clergy of their domains.

== Background ==
Greek and Latin states in southern Greece, c. 1210

Following the capture of Constantinople by the Fourth Crusade in April 1204, the establishment of the Latin Empire on the ruins of the Byzantine Empire and the treaty of partition of the latter's lands among the Crusader leaders, most of Greece was taken over relatively quickly by the Crusaders. Boniface of Montferrat established the Kingdom of Thessalonica in northern and eastern Greece, and gave fiefs to his followers in Thessaly and Central Greece. Further south, the Peloponnese was conquered by William of Champlitte and Geoffrey I of Villehardouin, establishing the Principality of Achaea, under Thessalonica's suzerainty. Only Epirus remained in Greek hands, with Michael I Komnenos Doukas establishing a separate principality there.

Alongside their various fiefs and principalities, the Crusaders installed Roman Catholic prelates in the local Greek Orthodox sees; the pre-existing patterns of ecclesiastical organization were largely maintained, but the new clergy was soon riven by rivalries. As William Miller writes, "The organisation of the Church was a fruitful source of quarrels. [...] the primate of Achaea, a Frenchman, fretted at being placed under the jurisdiction of a Venetian patriarch, who had promised his government to appoint none but Venetians to archbishoprics. [...] His suffragans had inherited from their Greek predecessors time-honoured but tiresome quarrels as to the boundaries of their dioceses; the clergy disputed with the bishops, the Templars with the primate." Many clerics, particularly French, soon left Greece for their homelands, while others were absentees and never visited their sees, and the behaviour of others differed little from that of mere adventurers out to make a fortune: the Latin Archbishop of Patras was suspended for financial mismanagement, and his counterpart of Corinth was dismissed and sent back to his monastery for misconduct.

These problems were compounded by the hostile attitude shown by the Frankish princes themselves towards the clergy. Thus the baron of Patras carried the archbishop off to prison, cut off the nose of his bailli, and used the episcopal residence and the nearby church of St. Theodore as the basis for the Castle of Patras. In this he followed the example of his own master, Geoffrey of Villehardouin, who refused to recognize the traditional privileges of the church, pay the tithe or compel his subjects and feudatories to pay it, and forced the clergy to use the secular courts, rather than ecclesiastical tribunals. The lord of the Duchy of Athens, Otho de la Roche, followed a similar policy, and even obliged the clergy to pay the land tax, thereby depriving the Latin Archbishopric of Thebes of over two thirds of its pre-Frankish conquest revenue. Even in Venetian-held Modon, the local governor barred the Latin bishop from using the cathedral or even residing in the castle.

== Parliament of Ravennika and aftermath ==
In 1209, the Latin Emperor Henry of Flanders campaigned in Greece, in order to suppress the rebellion of the Lombard lords of the Kingdom of Thessalonica; during this campaign, in May 1209 he held a parliament in the valley of Ravennika, a town near Zetouni, attended by many of the Frankish princes of Greece. During his presence in Greece, Henry became aware of the dissensions within the Latin clergy and its disputes with the secular lords, and decided to resolve the differences by convening another parliament, again at Ravennika, in May 1210.

The assembly saw a full convocation of the Frankish lords of Central Greece, although most of them probably did not attend in person, but signed by proxy: Otho de la Roche of Athens, Ravano dalle Carceri of Euboea, Nicholas I of Saint Omer and Albertino of Canossa, co-lords of Thebes, Thomas I d'Autremencourt of Salona, the Marquis of Bodonitsa Guy Pallavicini, William of Larissa and the lord of Velestino, Berthold of Katzenelnbogen, and finally the lord of Zetouni, Rainer of Travaglia. The archbishops of Athens, Neopatras, and of Larissa, however, along with eight of their suffragan bishops, were present at the parliament.

The assembled lords and prelates concluded a concordat, which recognized the independence and immunity of all Church property in Frankish Greece from any feudal duties, concomitant to its subordination, via the Latin Patriarch of Constantinople, solely to the Pope. The clergy would, however, continue to pay the old Byzantine tax of akrostichon to the secular rulers, and failure to do so would make Church property liable to confiscation. The Greek clergy was not granted the same privileges as the Latin one, in so far as the sons of a Greek priest might be called upon to perform feudal duties, unless they too were ordained. The agreement was ratified by Pope Innocent III, but notably not by Geoffrey of Villehardouin, who continued to persecute the Archbishopric of Patras and deny it any bequests and endowments. Even the rulers who signed it, however, were often tempted to breach its terms when coveting Church properties: both Villehardouin and Otho de la Roche would eventually be excommunicated and interdicted for this.

== Sources ==
- Longnon, Jean (1969) [1962]. "The Frankish States in Greece, 1204–1311". In Setton, Kenneth M.; Wolff, Robert Lee; Hazard, Harry W. (eds.). A History of the Crusades, Volume II: The Later Crusades, 1189–1311. Vol. 2 (Second ed.). Madison, Milwaukee, and London: University of Wisconsin Press. pp. 234–275. ISBN 0-299-04844-6.
- Miller, William (1908). The Latins in the Levant: A History of Frankish Greece (1204–1566). London: John Murray.
- Setton, Kenneth M. (1976). The Papacy and the Levant (1204–1571), Volume I: The Thirteenth and Fourteenth Centuries. Vol. 1. Philadelphia: The American Philosophical Society. ISBN 0-87169-114-0.
- Wolff, Robert Lee (1969) [1962]. "The Latin Empire of Constantinople, 1204–1261". In Setton, Kenneth M.; Wolff, Robert Lee; Hazard, Harry W. (eds.). A History of the Crusades, Volume II: The Later Crusades, 1189–1311. Vol. 2 (Second ed.). Madison, Milwaukee, and London: University of Wisconsin Press. pp. 186–233. ISBN 0-299-04844-6.
