= Parliament of Ravennika (1209) =

The First Parliament of Ravennika was convened in May 1209 by Latin Emperor Henry of Flanders in the town of Ravennika in Central Greece in an attempt to resolve the rebellion of the Lombard barons of the Kingdom of Thessalonica.

== Background ==
Greek and Latin states in southern Greece, c. 1210

Following the capture of Constantinople by the Fourth Crusade in April 1204, the establishment of the Latin Empire on the ruins of the Byzantine Empire and the treaty of partition of the latter's lands among the Crusader leaders, most of Greece was taken over relatively quickly by the Crusaders. Boniface of Montferrat established the Kingdom of Thessalonica in northern and eastern Greece, and gave fiefs to his followers in Thessaly and Central Greece. Further south, the Peloponnese was conquered by William of Champlitte and Geoffrey I of Villehardouin, establishing the Principality of Achaea, under Thessalonica's suzerainty. Only Epirus remained in Greek hands, with Michael I Komnenos Doukas establishing a separate principality there.

Boniface of Montferrat was killed fighting against the Bulgarians in 1207, leaving his underage son Demetrius on the throne. The powerful Lombard barons however, under the regent Oberto II of Biandrate, opposed Demetrius and his mother Margaret of Hungary, and preferred the throne to pass to Boniface's eldest son, William VI. They also opposed the Latin Emperor, Henry of Flanders, and demanded sovereignty over most of the European lands of the Byzantine Empire for Thessalonica. Henry succeeded in outmanoeuvring the Lombard barons and in January crowned Demetrius king, but Biandrate and the other Lombard barons launched a rebellion across the kingdom. Henry imprisoned Biandrate in Serres and marched south through Thessaly, overcoming the barons' opposition at Larissa. Henry treated the surrendered barons leniently, allowing them to keep their fiefs. But the rebellion was not yet quelled, as the barons of Central Greece and Euboea still opposed the emperor.

== Parliament of Ravennika and aftermath ==
Hoping to end the conflict quickly and without further bloodshed, Henry convened a parliament in the valley of Ravennika, a town near Lamia, in May 1209. Of the Lombard barons, only Amédée Pofey (Amedeo Buffa) came, was pardoned and re-invested with his fief. The others persisted in their rebellion and kept to their castles. The parliament did however assemble the remainder of the Frankish nobles of southern Greece, such as Otho de la Roche, lord of Thebes and Athens, and Geoffrey of Villehardouin, now Prince of Achaea. Henry received Villehardouin as his vassal, thereby subordinating Achaea directly to Constantinople rather than Thessalonica, and named him seneschal of the Latin Empire. After receiving imperial recognition of his title, Villehardouin also secured his position vis-à-vis the Republic of Venice, by becoming its vassal in the Treaty of Sapienza in June.

Henry then resumed his march south, forced the submission of Albertino of Canossa and Ravano dalle Carceri at Thebes, and went on to Athens. Biandrate escaped in the meantime and headed for Euboea, where Henry followed him. Biandrate tried to have the emperor assassinated, but Henry was protected by Ravano dalle Carceri, who was one of the triarchs of Negroponte. Biandrate was finally forced to capitulate, putting an end to the Lombard rebellion.

== Sources ==
- Longnon, Jean (1969) [1962]. "The Frankish States in Greece, 1204–1311". In Setton, Kenneth M.; Wolff, Robert Lee; Hazard, Harry W. (eds.). A History of the Crusades, Volume II: The Later Crusades, 1189–1311. Vol. 2 (Second ed.). Madison, Milwaukee, and London: University of Wisconsin Press. pp. 234–275. ISBN 0-299-04844-6.
- Miller, William (1908). The Latins in the Levant: A History of Frankish Greece (1204–1566). London: John Murray.
- Van Tricht, Filip (2011). The Latin Renovatio of Byzantium: The Empire of Constantinople (1204–1228). Leiden: Brill. ISBN 978-90-04-20323-5.
- Wolff, Robert Lee (1969) [1962]. "The Latin Empire of Constantinople, 1204–1261". In Setton, Kenneth M.; Wolff, Robert Lee; Hazard, Harry W. (eds.). A History of the Crusades, Volume II: The Later Crusades, 1189–1311. Vol. 2 (Second ed.). Madison, Milwaukee, and London: University of Wisconsin Press. pp. 186–233. ISBN 0-299-04844-6.
