= Treaty of Sapienza =

1209 treaty between the Republic of Venice and the Principality of Achaea

The Treaty of Sapienza was concluded in June 1209 between the Republic of Venice and the newly established Principality of Achaea, under Prince Geoffrey I of Villehardouin, concerning the partition of the Peloponnese (Morea) peninsula, conquered following the Fourth Crusade. By its terms, Venice, which had been accorded most of the Peloponnese in the Partitio Romaniae, recognized Villehardouin in possession of the entire peninsula except for the two forts of Modon and Coron, which came under Venetian control, and secured commercial and tax privileges in the Principality. The text of the treaty is also a valuable primary source for the early history of the Principality of Achaea.

== Background ==
Following the capture of Constantinople and the dissolution of the Byzantine Empire by the Fourth Crusade in 1204, the victorious Crusaders partitioned the Byzantine territories among them. The treaty of partition, the Partitio Romaniae, assigned most of the Peloponnese or Morea peninsula in southern Greece to the Republic of Venice, except for the northeastern regions of Corinthia and Argolis. In the event, Venice neglected to immediately enforce her claims, and in the course of 1205, a few hundred Crusaders, led by William of Champlitte and Geoffrey of Villehardouin, began to conquer the region on their own account. The conquest was fairly rapid, and the most determined Greek resistance was broken at the Battle of the Olive Grove of Koundouros in late summer. Isolated fortresses like Monemvasia, or the inhabitants of the mountainous regions of Tsakonia and Taygetus, still resisted, but by the end of 1205, Champlitte had consolidated his position enough for Pope Innocent III to refer to him as "Prince of Achaea".

== Venice in the Peloponnese and the Treaty of Sapienza ==
Map of the Peloponnese in the Middle Ages

Venice did not appear in the Peloponnese until 1206 or 1207, when a fleet took the Messenian peninsula with the two forts of Modon and Coron from Champlitte's men. In late 1208, Champlitte left the Peloponnese to take up his inheritance in Burgundy, and Villehardouin succeeded him as ruler of the new Frankish state, adroitly exploiting feudal law to avoid Champlitte's nephew from taking up the title instead. In May 1209, Geoffrey of Villehardouin participated in the Parliament of Ravennika, convened by the Latin Emperor Henry of Flanders. It was probably there—and likely through the Emperor's mediation—that negotiations began to reach a settlement reconciling Villehardouin's de facto possession of the Peloponnese and the Venetian claims, which led to the signing of a treaty at the island of Sapienza, off Modon, in June.

By the terms of the treaty, Venice kept only the two forts of Modon and Coron, and recognized Geoffrey of Villehardouin as the master of the entire Peloponnese, "all the way to Corinth". In return, Villehardouin became a vassal of the Republic, with which he concluded a perpetual alliance. He and his descendants would have to become Venetian citizens, and were obliged to maintain a house in Venice and send an annual gift of two silk brocades for St Mark's Basilica and one for the Doge of Venice. Venice also acquired an exemption of her merchants from all tariffs, and the right to establish "a church, a market and a court" in every city of the principality.

The treaty satisfied both sides: Venice acquired a valuable outpost in the possession of Modon and Coron and safeguarded her commercial interests, while Achaea acquired a powerful ally in the form of the Venetian fleet, in exchange for a rather theoretical Venetian suzerainty. Villehardouin himself further secured Venetian support for his claim for the princely title against the Champlitte claimants, and by 1210 he had gained recognition as princeps Achaiae from the Pope.

== The Treaty of Sapienza as a historical source ==
The text of the treaty is a valuable historical document as it is a unique source for information on the actual state of the Frankish principality so soon after its foundation. As the French medievalist Antoine Bon remarks, other, later sources, chiefly the Chronicle of the Morea, present the feudal organization of the principality as "complete and definitive" by 1209/10, but the Treaty of Sapienza shows the process of its consolidation still ongoing and incomplete.

Most notably, the principality had yet to achieve its full territorial extent, as the entire southeastern portion of the Peloponnese, the plain of Laconia with the two flanking mountain ranges of the Taygetus and the Parnon, were still unsubdued and held by the native Greeks, while in the northwest the Greek garrisons of the two fortresses of Argos and Nauplia continued to hold out until 1211/12. It was not until the early 1220s that the Laconian plain would come under Frankish control, and the last Greek outpost, Monemvasia, surrendered only in 1248.

The treaty also preserves the names of the feudal and ecclesiastic lords of the principality who signed it as witnesses, many of which are not otherwise attested.

== Sources ==
- Bon, Antoine (1969). La Morée franque. Recherches historiques, topographiques et archéologiques sur la principauté d'Achaïe [The Frankish Morea. Historical, Topographic and Archaeological Studies on the Principality of Achaea] (in French). Paris: De Boccard.
- Setton, Kenneth M. (1976). The Papacy and the Levant (1204–1571), Volume I: The Thirteenth and Fourteenth Centuries. Vol. 1. Philadelphia: The American Philosophical Society. ISBN 0-87169-114-0.
