= Roman Catholic Diocese of Cardica =

Diocese in the town of Cardica in the Thessaly region of Greece

The Diocese of Cardica (Latin: Dioecesis Cardicensis) was a Roman Catholic diocese located in the town of Cardica in the Thessaly region of Greece. In 1389, it was suppressed. It was later revived as a titular episcopal see.

== Ordinaries ==
=== Diocese of Cardica ===
Erected: 1208
Latin Name: Cardicensis

- Luca, O.S.M. (22 Dec 1363 Appointed – )

Suppressed: 1389

== See also ==
- Catholic Church in Greece
