= Lamia (city) =

City in Phthiotis, Greece

Lamia Λαμία
- Municipality
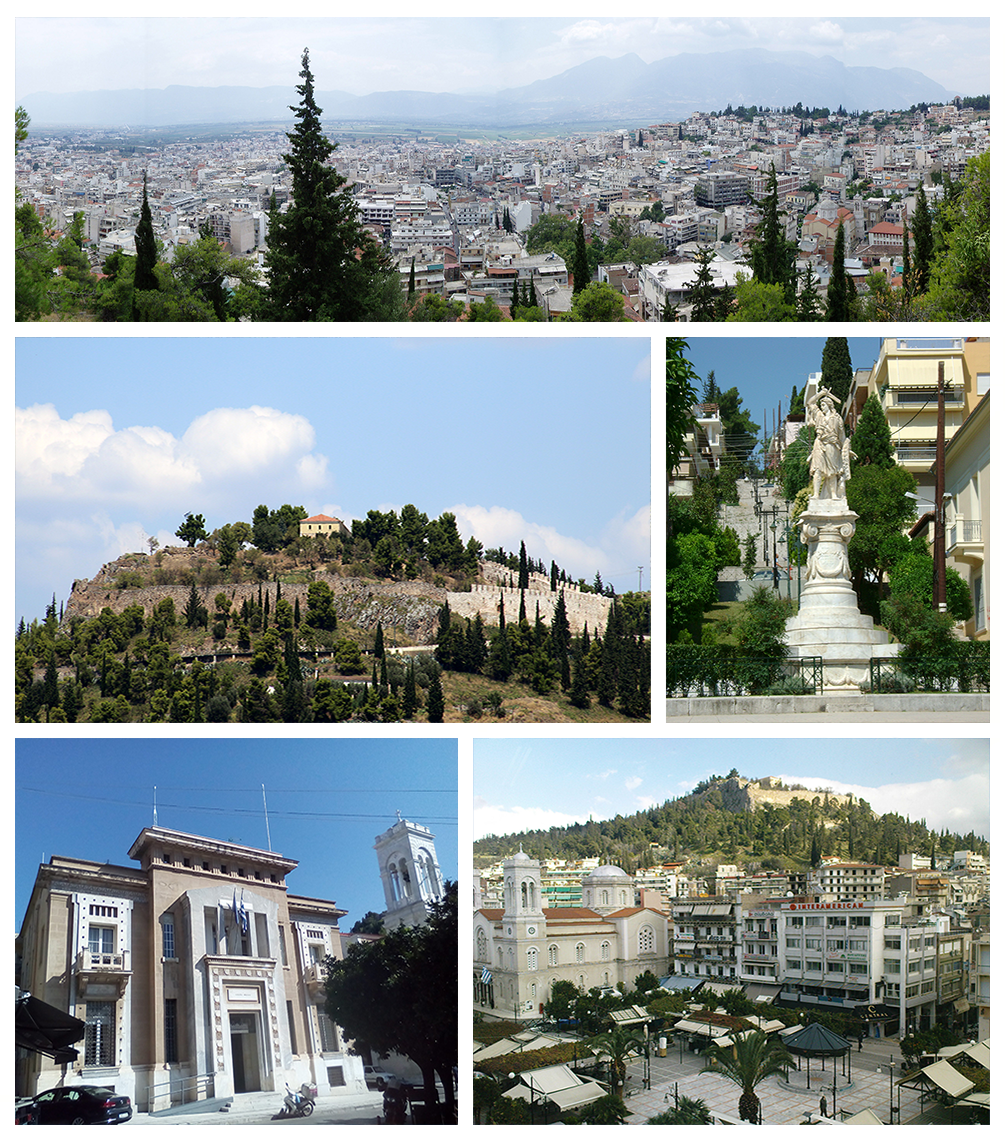
- Clockwise from top: Panoramic view of the City of Lamia from Lamia Castle, Statue of Athanasios Diakos, Eleutheria's Square in downtown Lamia, Mansion of the Central Greece Administration, and Lamia Castle.

- Seal

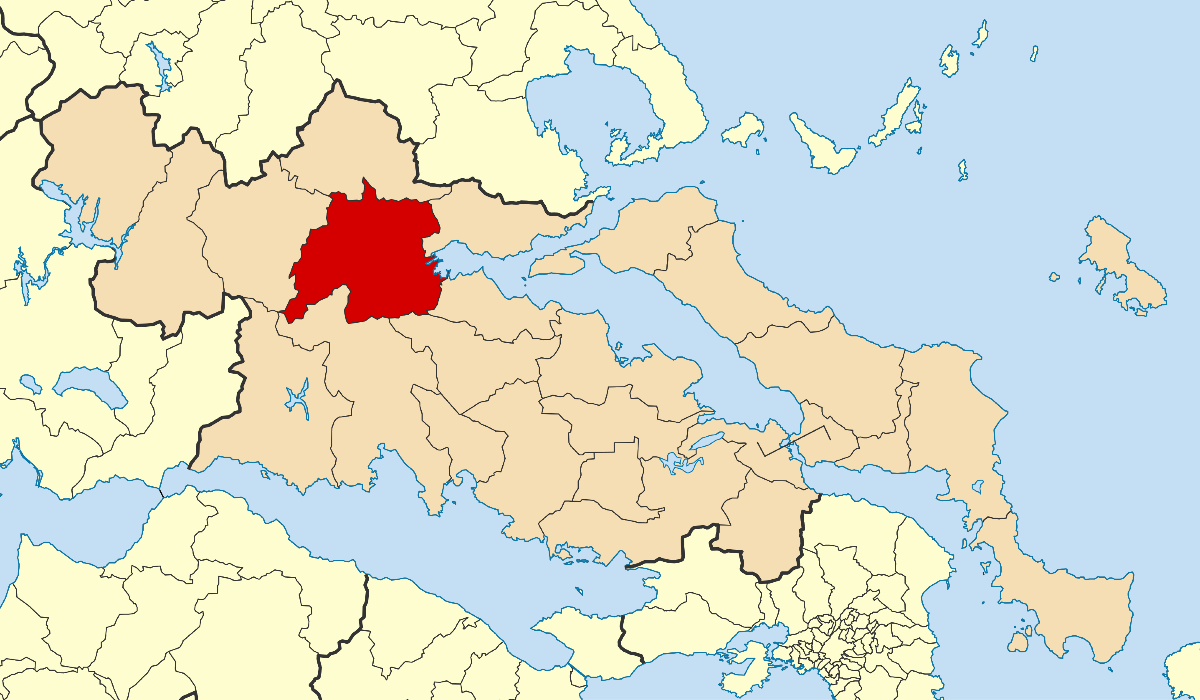

- Location within Greece
- Coordinates: 38°54′N 22°26′E
- Country: Greece
- Administrative region: Central Greece
- Regional unit: Phthiotis

Government
  - Mayor: Panourgias Papaioannou (since 2023)

Area
  - Municipality: 947.0 km^{2} (365.6 sq mi)
  - Municipal unit: 413.5 km^{2} (159.7 sq mi)
- Elevation: 100 m (330 ft)
- Highest elevation: 225 m (738 ft)
- Lowest elevation: 20 m (66 ft)

Population (2021)
  - Municipality: 66,657
  - Density: 70.39/km^{2} (182.3/sq mi)
  - Municipal unit: 58,289
  - Municipal unit density: 141.0/km^{2} (365.1/sq mi)
  - Community: 47,529
- Time zone: UTC+2 (EET)
  - Summer (DST): UTC+3 (EEST)
- Postal code: 351 00, 351 31, 351 32, 351 33
- Area code: 22310
- Vehicle registration: ΜΙ
- Website: https://www.lamia.gr/

Lamia (Greek: Λαμία, Lamía, pronounced [laˈmi.a]) is a city in central Greece. The city dates back to antiquity, and is today the capital of the regional unit of Phthiotis and of the Central Greece region (comprising five regional units). According to the 2021 census, the Municipality of Lamia has a population of 66,657, while Lamia itself has 47,529 inhabitants. The city is located on the slopes of Mount Othrys, near the river Spercheios. It serves as the agricultural center of a fertile rural and livestock area.

== Name ==
One account holds that the city was named after the mythological figure of Lamia, the daughter of Poseidon and queen of the Trachineans. Another account holds that it is named after the Malians, the inhabitants of the surrounding area. In the Middle Ages, Lamia was called Zetounion (Ζητούνιον), a name first encountered in the 8th Ecumenical Council in 869. It was known as Girton under Frankish rule following the Fourth Crusade and later El Citó when it was controlled by the Catalan Company of mercenaries. In Turkish, it was sometimes called İzdin or İzzeddin. The city was also known as Zeitoun.

== History ==
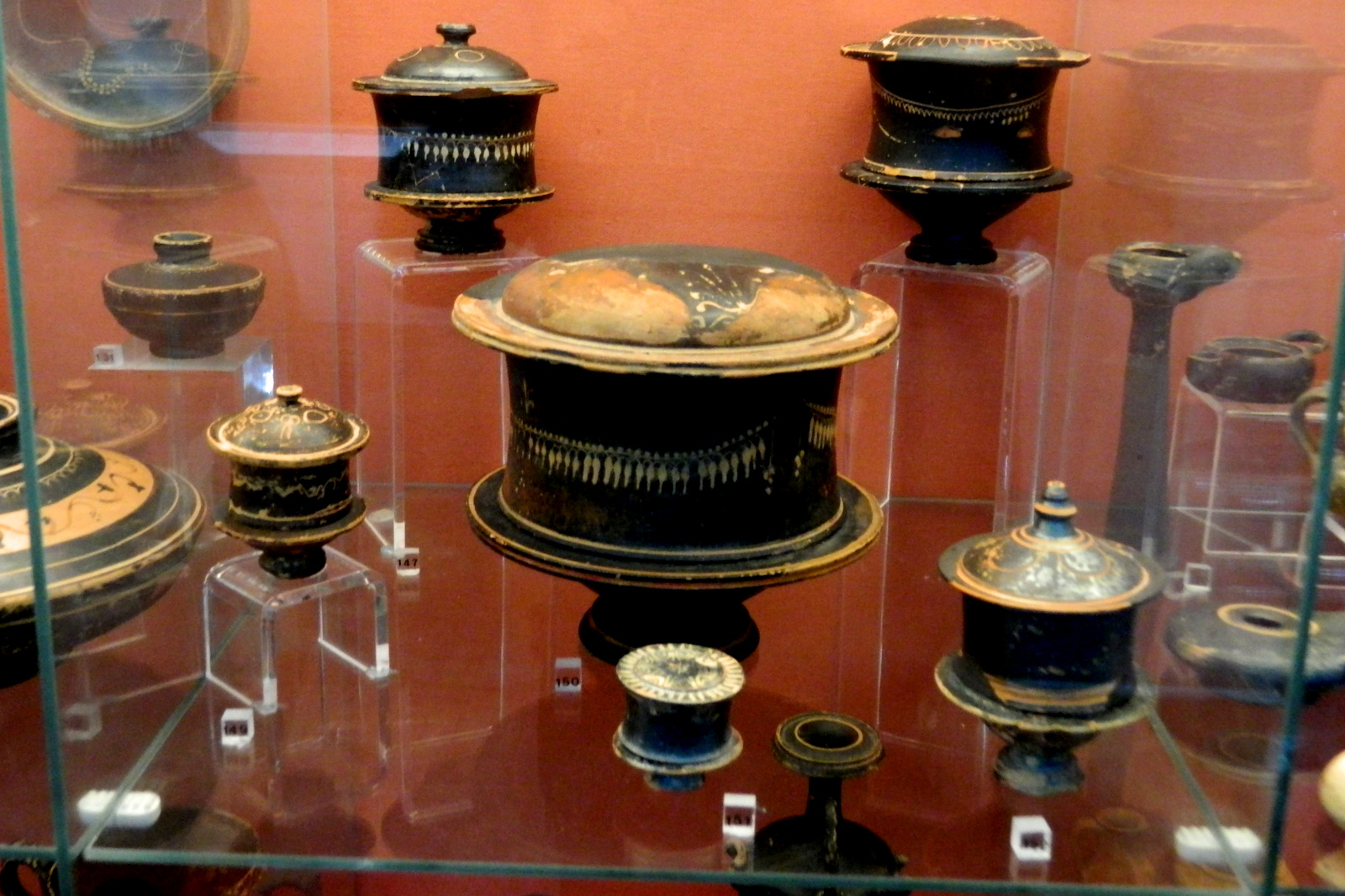
Exhibits at the archaeological museum of the city

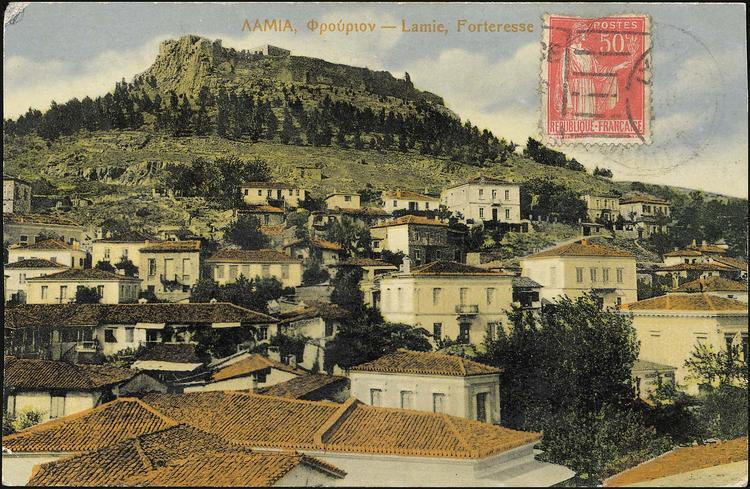
Postcard of Lamia, 1917.

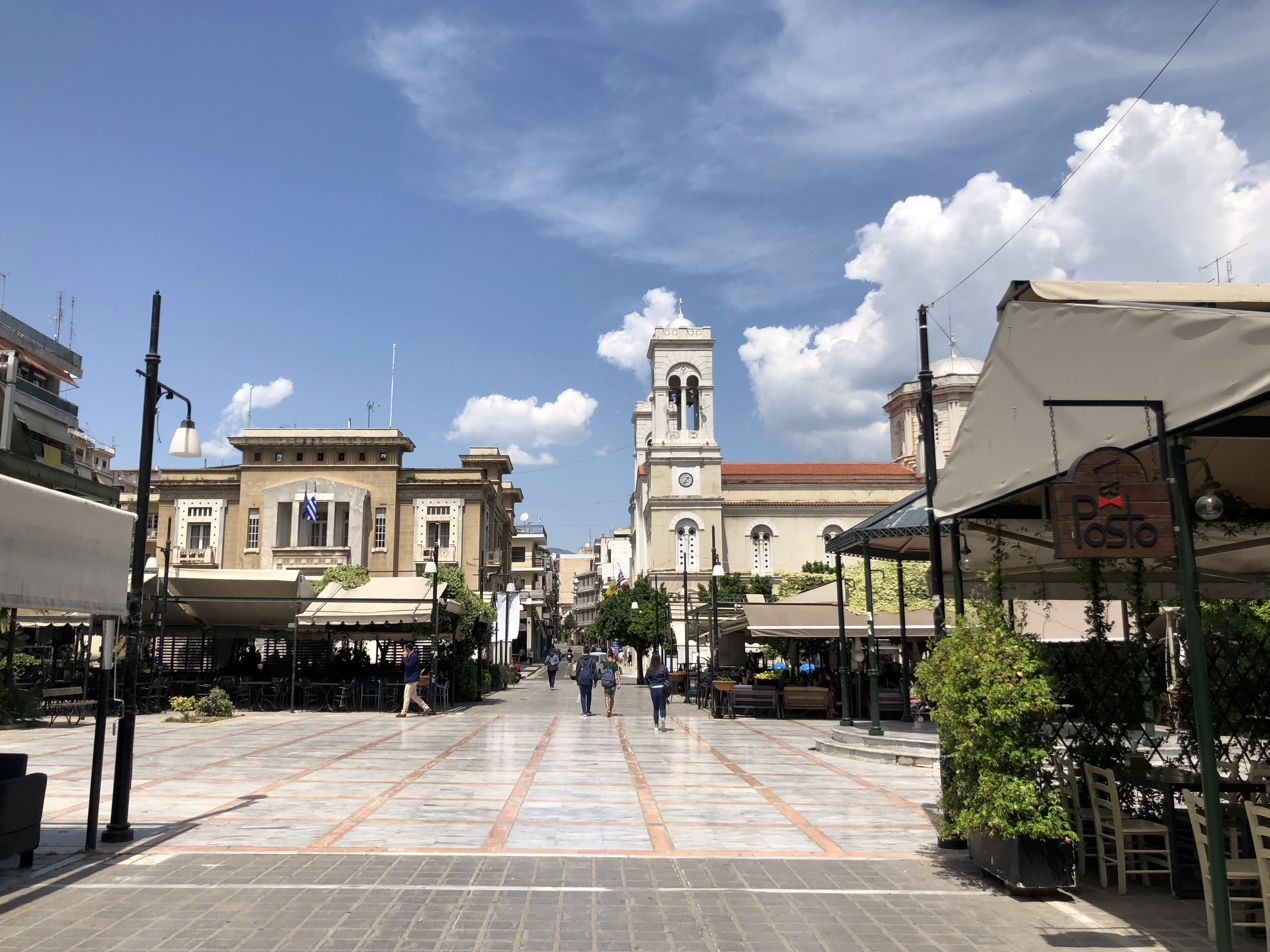
Eleftherias Square

Archaeological excavations have shown the site of Lamia to have been inhabited since at least the Bronze Age (3rd millennium BC).

In antiquity, the city played an important role due to its strategic location, controlling the narrow coastal plain above Thermopylae that connected southern Greece with Thessaly and the rest of the Balkans. In its ancient phase, Lamia was located closer to the sea, which explains the existence of the nearby temple dedicated to Poseidon. With the flow of the Spercheios river, the terrain changed and the sealine was dragged to the interior of the Malian Gulf -this geological phenomenon altered the straights of Thermopylae, too.

Lamia constituted a polis (city-state). The city was therefore fortified in the 5th century BC, and was contested by the Macedonians, Thessalians and Aetolians until the Roman conquest in the early 2nd century BC. After Alexander the Great's death in 323 BC, the Athenians and other Greeks rebelled against Macedonian overlordship. Antipatros, the regent of Macedon, took refuge behind the substantial walls of Lamia at the beginning of the Lamian War, 323–322 BC. The war ended with the death of the Athenian general Leosthenes, and the arrival of a 20,000-strong Makedonian army. Lamia prospered afterwards, especially in the 3rd century BC in the Aetolian League, up until the Roman Manius Acilius Glabrio sacked the city in 190 BC.

Little is known of the city's history for a number of centuries after that. In Late Antiquity, the city was the seat of a bishop (attested since 431), suffragan of Larissa, but had declined to obscurity: for instance, it is not shown on the 5th-century Tabula Peutingeriana. Some archaeological remains from the period have been found in the Castle (the city's ancient acropolis), including a basilica, coins and marble inscriptions, while the walls of the Castle are thought to have been rebuilt under Justinian I in the 6th century. The Synecdemus of Hierocles includes Lamia among the 16 cities of the province of Thessaly.

The city was occupied by Slavs in the 7th century, and re-appears only in 869/70 under the name of Zetounion (Ζητοῦνιον), probably deriving from a Slavic word for "grain". The city played once more a role in the Byzantine–Bulgarian wars of the late 10th century due to its vicinity to Thermopylae: it was near the town that the Byzantine general Nikephoros Ouranos scored a crushing victory over Tsar Samuel of Bulgaria in the Battle of Spercheios in 997. The city was visited by Emperor Basil II in his triumphal journey to Greece in 1018, and in 1165, the Jewish traveller Benjamin of Tudela recorded 50 Jewish families in the city and of raids by the neighbouring Vlachs.

Following the Fourth Crusade (1204), the city was captured by the Frankish crusaders. Initially, it was given as a fief to the Knights Templar, who rebuilt its fortress. In 1209–10 the Templars were evicted due to their support to the rebellion of the Lombard barons of the Kingdom of Thessalonica. The Latin Emperor Henry of Flanders confiscated the city (and neighbouring Ravennika) and made it an imperial domain under a bailli, possibly Rainerio of Travale. Under Frankish rule, it was the seat of a Roman Catholic bishop (Dioecesis Sidoniensis or Cythoniensis), probably a suffragan of the Latin Archbishop of Neopatras. In c. 1218/20, or shortly after 1223, the two towns were captured by the Epirote Greeks. Lamia remained in Greek hands until it was surrendered again to the Franks of the Duchy of Athens in 1275 as part of the dowry of Helena Angelina Komnene, daughter of John I Doukas, ruler of Thessaly. It thereby again became a Catholic see.

The Catalans held the city from 1318 until 1391, when it passed to the Acciaioli Dukes of Athens. The fortress was razed by the Ottoman Sultan Bayezid I in 1394. After the disastrous Battle of Ankara in 1402, the weakened Ottomans were forced to return some territories, including the region of Zetounion, to Byzantine rule. The Turks besieged the city for two years sometime before 1415, but the Byzantines resisted successfully. Sometime between 1424 and July 1426, however, the city had been once more conquered by the Turks. Apart from an attack by the troops of the Despotate of the Morea in 1444, which plundered the city, from then on the town remained under firm Ottoman control until it became part of the newly independent Kingdom of Greece in 1832. Until the annexation of Thessaly in 1881, it was a border city (the borders were drawn at a site known as "Taratsa" just north of Lamia).

== Climate ==
Lamia has a hot-summer Mediterranean climate (Köppen climate classification: Csa). It has 4 distinct seasons: winter, spring, summer and autumn. The cold and wet period lasts from late October to mid April and the warm, moderately dry period from mid April to late October, with transitional phases in between. The record lowest temperature ever in Lamia is −12.6 °C (9.3 °F), recorded in December 2001 and the record highest is 46.5 °C (115.7 °F) °C, recorded during the summer of 1973.

Climate data for Lamia airport, Central Greece 1991–2020 normals and extremes, (rainfall, humidity 1970–2010), 143.4 m asl
Month	Jan	Feb	Mar	Apr	May	Jun	Jul	Aug	Sep	Oct	Nov	Dec	Year
Record high °C (°F)	25.0 (77.0)	26.7 (80.1)	34.2 (93.6)	35.3 (95.5)	37.6 (99.7)	44.6 (112.3)	46.5 (115.7)	45.4 (113.7)	40.4 (104.7)	37.3 (99.1)	30.0 (86.0)	28.0 (82.4)	46.5 (115.7)
Mean daily maximum °C (°F)	12.3 (54.1)	13.8 (56.8)	16.9 (62.4)	21.1 (70.0)	26.7 (80.1)	31.8 (89.2)	33.7 (92.7)	33.4 (92.1)	29.2 (84.6)	23.6 (74.5)	17.9 (64.2)	13.1 (55.6)	22.8 (73.0)
Daily mean °C (°F)	7.6 (45.7)	8.7 (47.7)	11.2 (52.2)	14.9 (58.8)	20.1 (68.2)	24.7 (76.5)	26.4 (79.5)	26.1 (79.0)	22.3 (72.1)	17.9 (64.2)	12.9 (55.2)	8.8 (47.8)	16.8 (62.2)
Mean daily minimum °C (°F)	3.0 (37.4)	3.6 (38.5)	5.7 (42.3)	8.8 (47.8)	13.4 (56.1)	17.5 (63.5)	19.2 (66.6)	18.8 (65.8)	15.5 (59.9)	12.1 (53.8)	7.9 (46.2)	4.6 (40.3)	10.8 (51.5)
Record low °C (°F)	−7 (19)	−10 (14)	−6.9 (19.6)	−1.0 (30.2)	2.8 (37.0)	9.0 (48.2)	12.6 (54.7)	12.8 (55.0)	7.4 (45.3)	−1.2 (29.8)	−3.6 (25.5)	−12.6 (9.3)	−12.6 (9.3)
Average rainfall mm (inches)	63.8 (2.51)	60.7 (2.39)	59.7 (2.35)	42.3 (1.67)	33.3 (1.31)	19.3 (0.76)	21.1 (0.83)	21.3 (0.84)	23.7 (0.93)	65.4 (2.57)	73.2 (2.88)	72.5 (2.85)	556.3 (21.89)
Average rainy days	13.0	12.9	12.2	10.6	8.7	5.3	3.8	3.9	5.9	10.4	11.0	13.5	111.2
Average relative humidity (%)	76.8	74.3	71.1	65.6	59.2	50.2	50.3	54.5	61.7	71.5	76.5	78.0	65.8
Mean monthly sunshine hours	114.7	127.3	175.9	185.8	238.2	277.9	312.3	278.3	203.5	147.8	121.8	87.1	2,270.6
Source: Info Climat climate averages and sunshine, HNMS rainfall, humidity

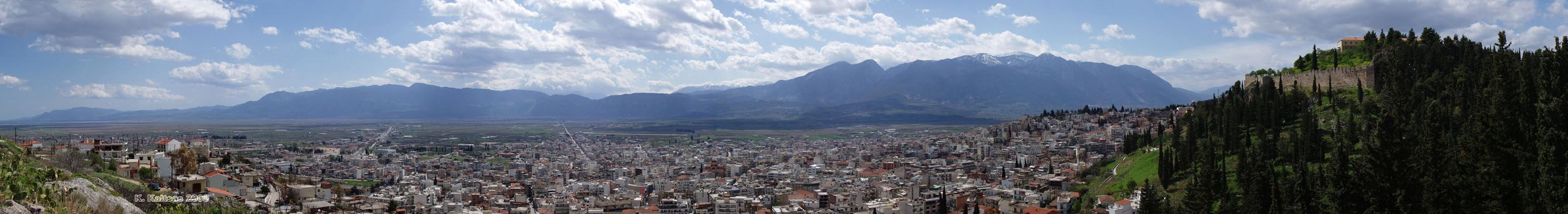
Panoramic view of Lamia and the Castle

== Landmarks ==
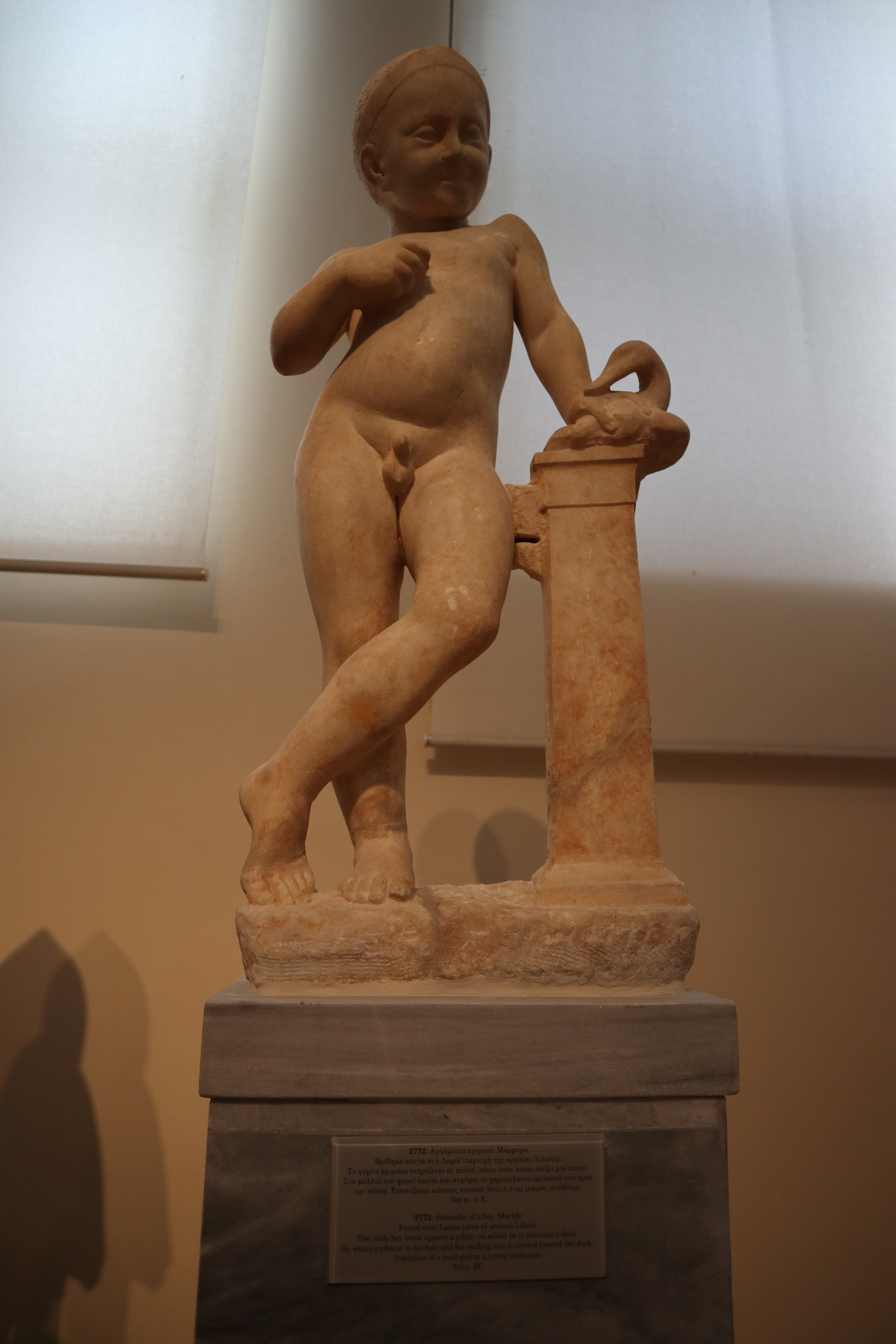
Statuette of a boy. Marble. Found near Lamia (area of ancient Lilaia). The nude boy leans against a pillar, on which he is pressing a duck. He wears a ribbon in his hair and his smiling face is turned toward the duck. Depiction of a local god or a young dictator. 3rd c. BC. National Archaeological Museum, Athens

- Lamia Castle, the city's fortified Acropolis. The castle had a military use until the years of king Otto I, when it housed the army barracks.
- Platia Eleftherias (Freedom Square) - site of the towns independence day parade, and main cathedral. Also has many cafes with outdoor seating.
- Platia Diakou (Diakos Square) - square containing the statue of Athanasios Diakos
- Platia Parkou (Park Square)
- Platia Laou (People's Square) - square featuring the statue of Aris Velouchiotis

== Transport ==
=== Road ===
The EO1 and EO3 roads pass through the city, with the Lamia Eastern Bypass connecting the two roads to the north east of the city: the EO38 starts from the city, heading west towards Agrinio and Thermo. Lamia is bypassed by the A1 motorway to the south east, and the A3 motorway (which branches off the A1 near Anthili) to the south west. An KTEL station serves intercity bus routes to and from Lamia.

=== Bus ===
The urban KTEL of the city serves the transport of the apartments and settlements of the Municipality of Lamia. Also, in Lamia there are several taxi "piazzas". City taxis are red. In addition, cycle paths operate within Lamia.

=== Rail ===
The city is served by Lamia railway station, with Regional services to Leianokladi and Stylida.

=== Air transport ===
Lamia Airport is located 2 kilometres from the Old Lamia-Athens National Road. The airport belongs to the Air Force and has no commercial or passenger traffic. It is used in emergency situations. The Aeroclub of Fthiotida also uses it for its activities.

== Administration ==
The municipality Lamia was formed at the 2011 local government reform by the merger of the following 5 former municipalities, that became municipal units:

- Gorgopotamos
- Lamia
- Leianokladi (Lianokladi)
- Pavliani
- Ypati

The municipality has an area of 947.006km^{2}, the municipal unit 413.482km^{2}.

=== List of mayors ===
The mayors of Lamia from 1881 to 2023 were as follows:

1836 - 1916	1916 - 1945
Nikolaos Chrysovergis (1836-1837); Ioannis Petropoulos (1837-1841); Georgios Chalmoukos (1841-1846); Nikolaos Papaioannou (1846-1850); Georgios Chalmoukos (1850-1854); Kyriakos Tassikas (1854-1857); Dimos Papavasileiou (1857-1866); Konstantinos Kritsas (1866-1870); Ioannis Kyrozis (1870-1874); Komnas Trakas (1874-1878); Komnas Trakas (1878-1881); Dimitrios Stougiannos (1881-1883); Aristidis Sklivaniotis (1883-1887); Themistocles Lazos (1887-1891); Aristidis Sklivaniotis (1891-1899); Nikolaos Kritsas (1899-1903); Spyros Trakas (1903-1914); Spyros Trakas (1908-1914); Stylianos Anastasiou (1914-1916); Athanasios Michalopoulos (1916-1917)	Stylianos Anastasiou (1917-1922); Georgios Karakantas (26 January - 3 August 1922); Stylianos Anastasiou (1922-1925); Ioannis Makropoulos (1925-1929); Georgios Platis (1929-1934); Spyros Petropoulos (1934-1937); Nikolaos Doudoumopoulos (1937-1940); Athanasios Grammatikas (1940-1941); Konstantinos Platis (9 September - 21 October 1941); Dimitrios Trakas (21 October 1941 - 16 January 1942); Ioannis Elasonas (27 January - 12 March 1942); Dimitrios Trakas (27 March 1942 - 4 January 1943); Nikolaos Kontogiannis (5 January - 5 November 1943); Dimitrios Latsos (6 November 1943 - 2 March 1944); Ioannis Kontomitros (3 March - 1 September 1944); Themistocles Theodosopoulos (2-23 September 1944); Nikolaos Kokkalakis (24 September - 29 October 1944); Nikolaos Vellios (29 October 1944 - 6 March 1945); Elias Katsogiannos (2-17 February 1945); Nikolaos Kokkalakis (18 February - 2 September 1945)

1945 - 1981	1981 - Present
Elias Katsogiannos (2-17 February 1945); Nikolaos Kokkalakis (18 February - 2 September 1945); Apostolos Pasiakos (21 September 1945 - 21 January 1946); Ioannis Papasiopoulos (21 January - 4 February 1946); Iosif Ser (23-31 March 1946); Stavros Haralampopoulos (1946-1948); Nikolaos Koutsodontis (one week); Alkiviadis Machairas (one week); Dimitris Kouiozis (30 August - 26 September 1948); Evangelos Myresiotis (1948-1950); Hercules Papadopoulos (1950-1951); Ioannis Papasiopoulos (1955-1959); Ioannis Papasiopoulos (1959-1964); Apostolos Kounoupis (1964-1967); Charalambos Tsoukalas (11-26 May 1967); Georgios Pasiakos (26 May - 1 October 1967); Nikolaos Moudouris (1967-1974); Kosmas Anagnostatos (1974-1975); Apostolos Kounoupis (1975-1978); Antonios Filis (1978-1981)	Lambros Papadimas (1982-1989); Lambros Papadimas (1990-1993); Ioannis Papadimitriou (a few days in 1993); Georgios Delis (1993-1998); Georgios Kotronias (1999-2014); Nikolaos Stavrogiannis (2014-2019); Euthymios Karaiskos (2019-2023); Panourgias Papaioannou (2024 - Present)

== Education ==
Six departments of the University of Thessaly based in the city.

== Historical population ==
Year	Municipal unit	Municipality
1981	41,846	-
1991	55,445	-
2001	58,601	-
2011	64,716	75,315
2021	58,289	66,657

== Notable people ==
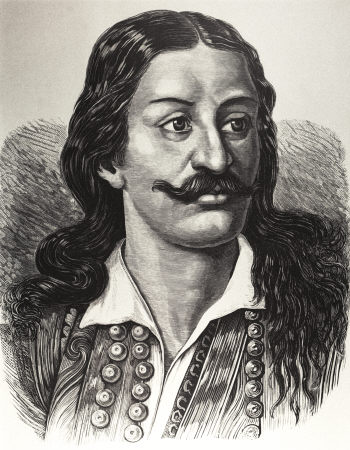
Athanasios Diakos

- Athanasios Diakos (1788–1821) Greek military commander during the Greek War of Independence, died in Lamia
- Dimitrios Giatzis (1891–1964) Army officer
- Ioannis Paparrodou (1904–1941) Army Officer
- Aris Velouchiotis (nom de guerre of Athanasios Klaras) (1905–1945), leader of ELAS during the World War II guerrilla Greek Resistance
- Ilias Tsirimokos (1907–1968) politician, former Prime Minister of Greece
- Thanos Leivaditis (1934–2005) actor and screenwriter
- Dimitris Koutsoumpas (1955) General Secretary of the KKE
- Niki Bakoyianni (1968) high jumper (Olympic silver medalist)
- Christos Staikouras (1973) economist, politician, New Democracy's Coordinator of Economic Affairs, Minister of Finance
- Evgenia Dimitropoulou (1984) actress
- Konstantinos G. Polymeros (1995) Sinologist, author.

== International relations ==
Lamia is twinned with:

- Rzeszów, Poland
- Chioggia, Italy
- Mytilene, Greece
- Paphos, Cyprus

== Sporting teams ==
Lamia has some sport clubs that play in the higher national divisions. For a period of one season, Lamia hosted the Athenian basketball club Panellinios B.C. The main clubs of Lamia are shown below.

Sport clubs based in Lamia
Club	Founded	Sports	Achievements
Lamia	1964	Football	Presence in Superleague
G.S. Lamias Achilleus	1976	Volleyball	Presence in A1 Ethniki
Ionikos Lamias B.C.	1992	Basketball	Earlier presence in A2 Ethniki
Nireas Lamias	1998	Water Polo	Presence in A1 Ethniki

== Gallery ==
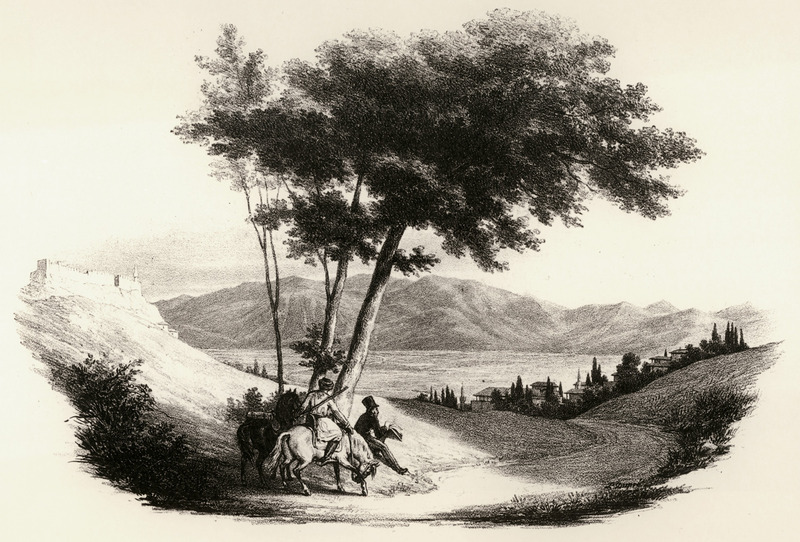
Lamia and Thermopylae by Louis Dupré, 1827

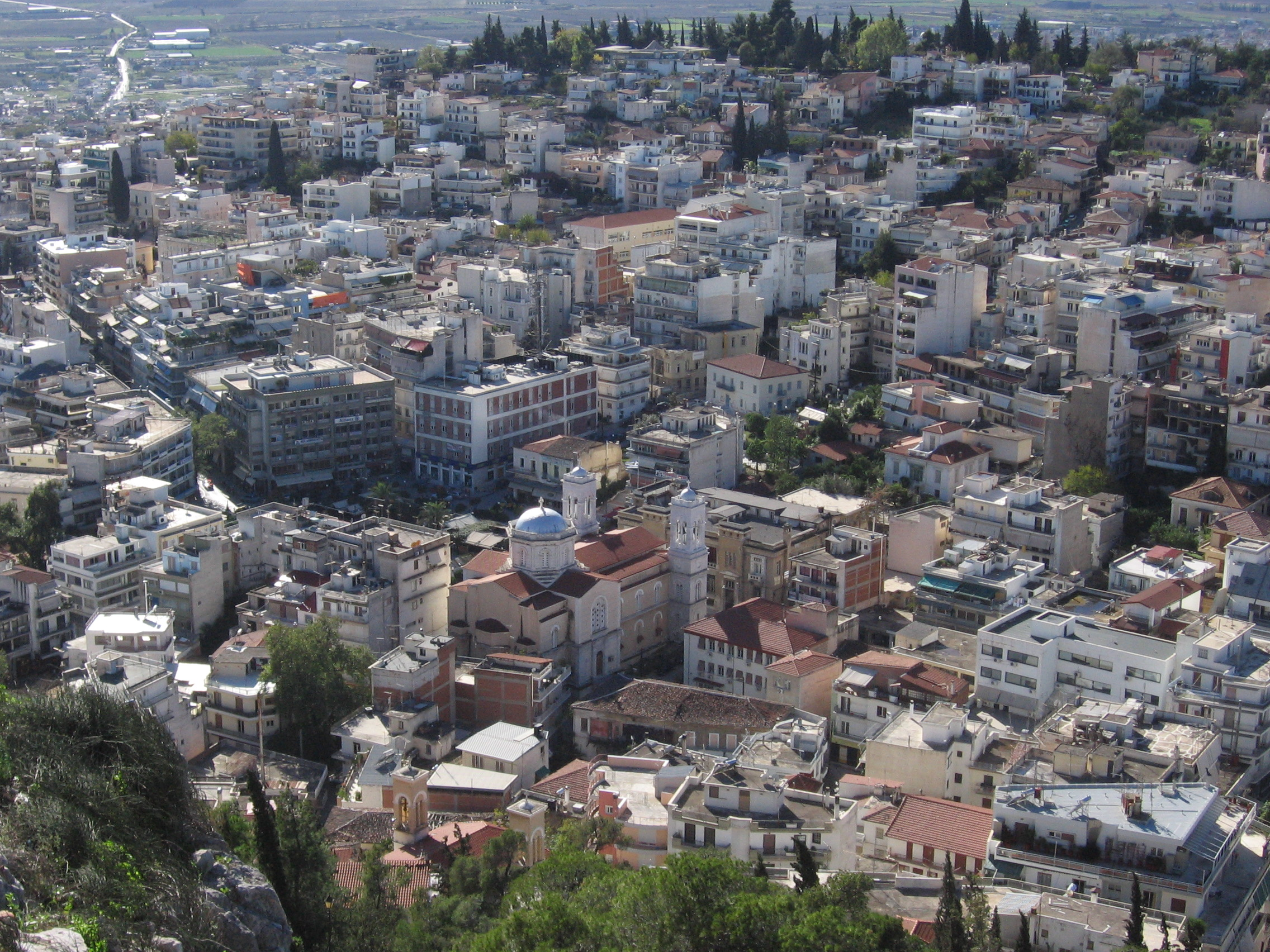
Panoramic view

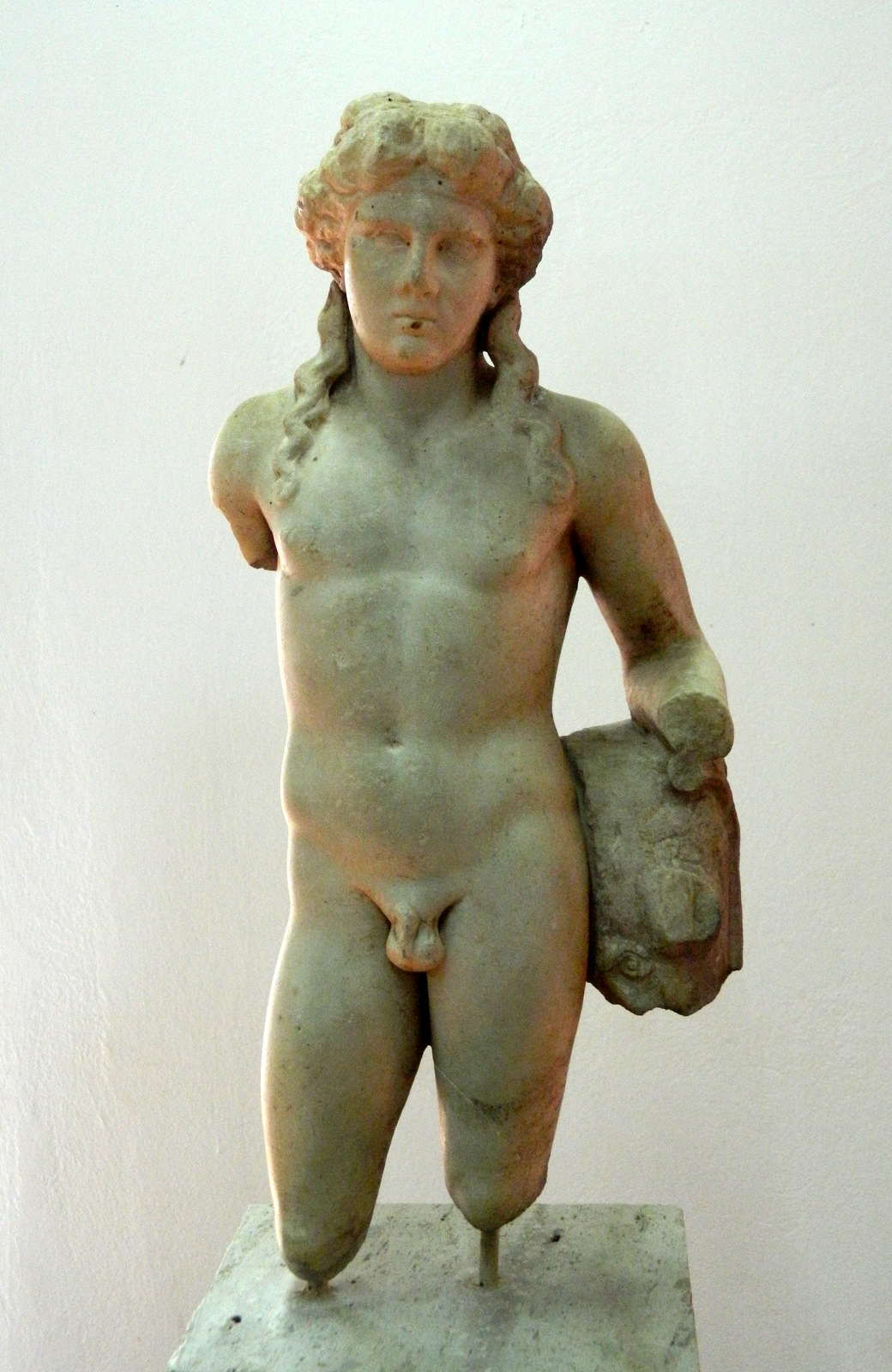
Young Dionysus statue, AM of Lamia

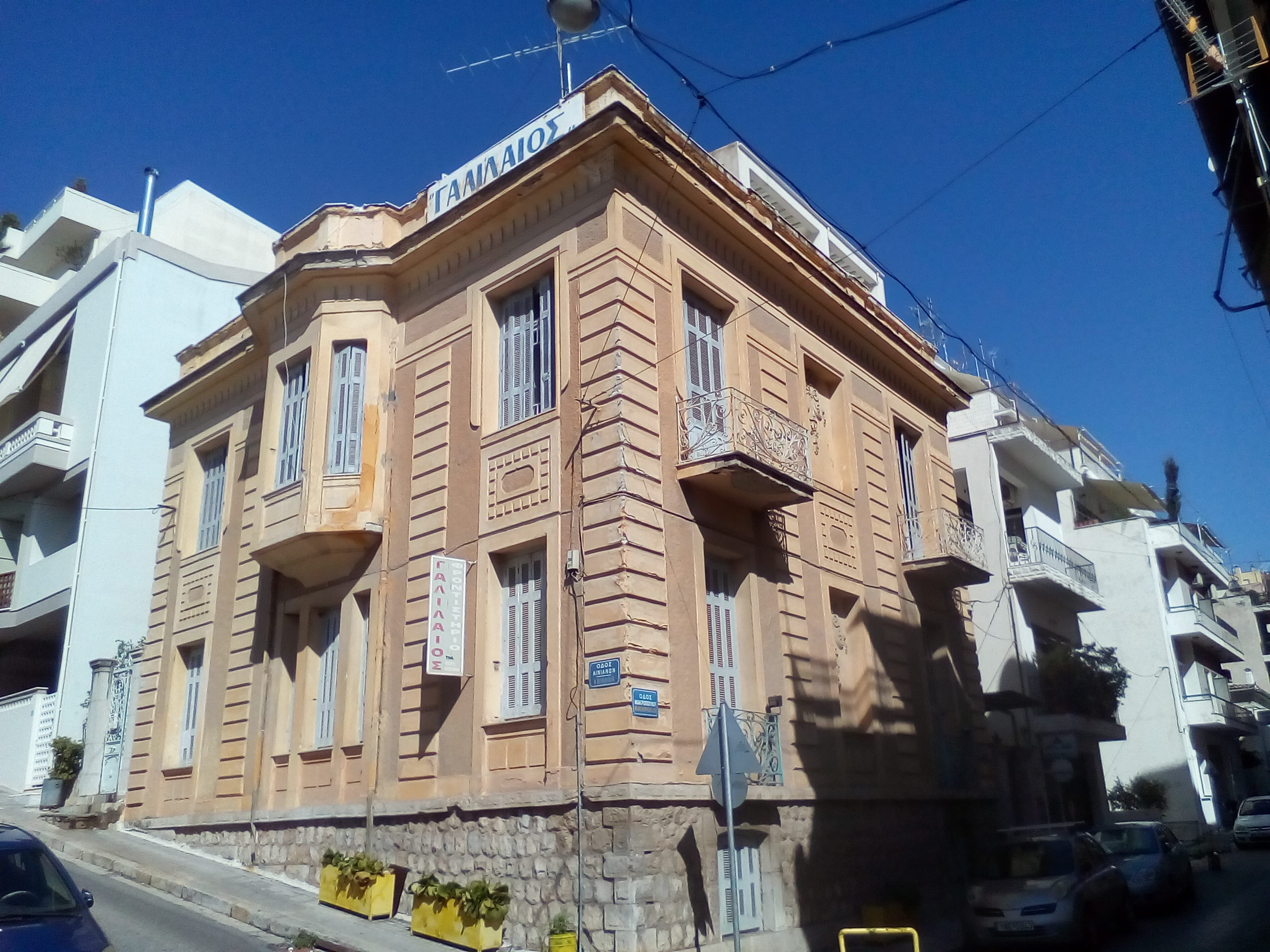
Michou mansion

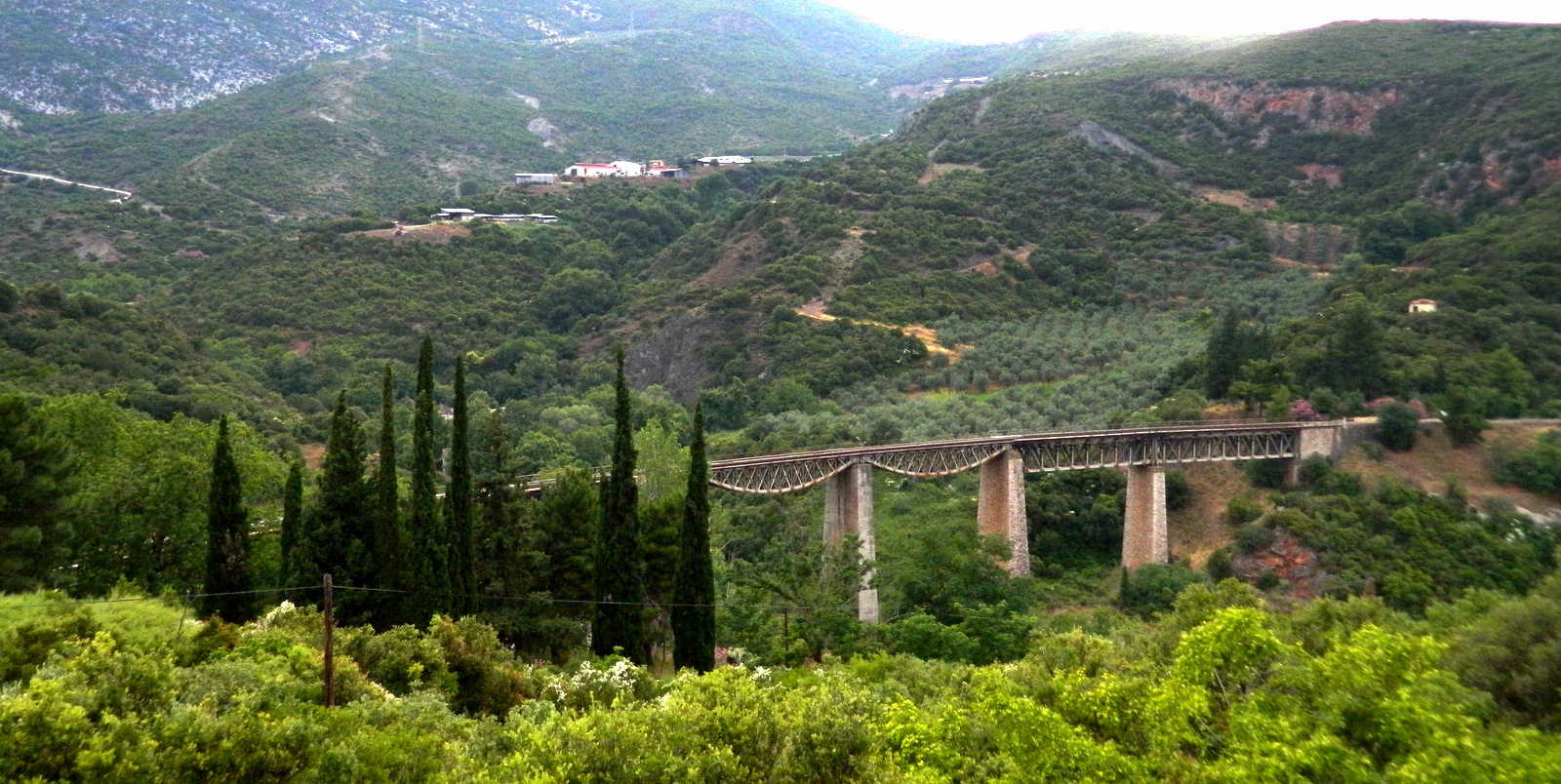
Gorgopotamos Bridge near Lamia

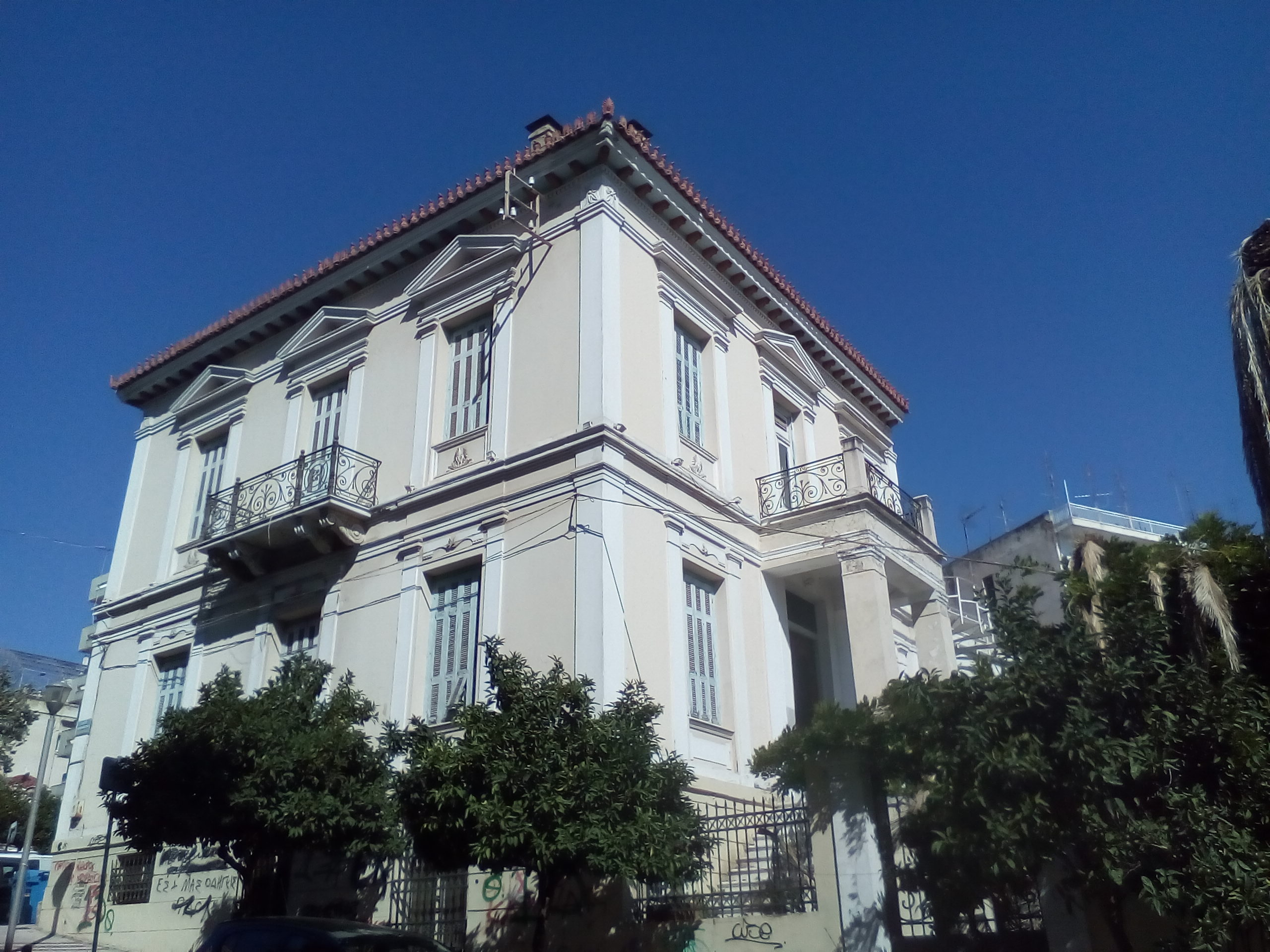
Elassona mansion

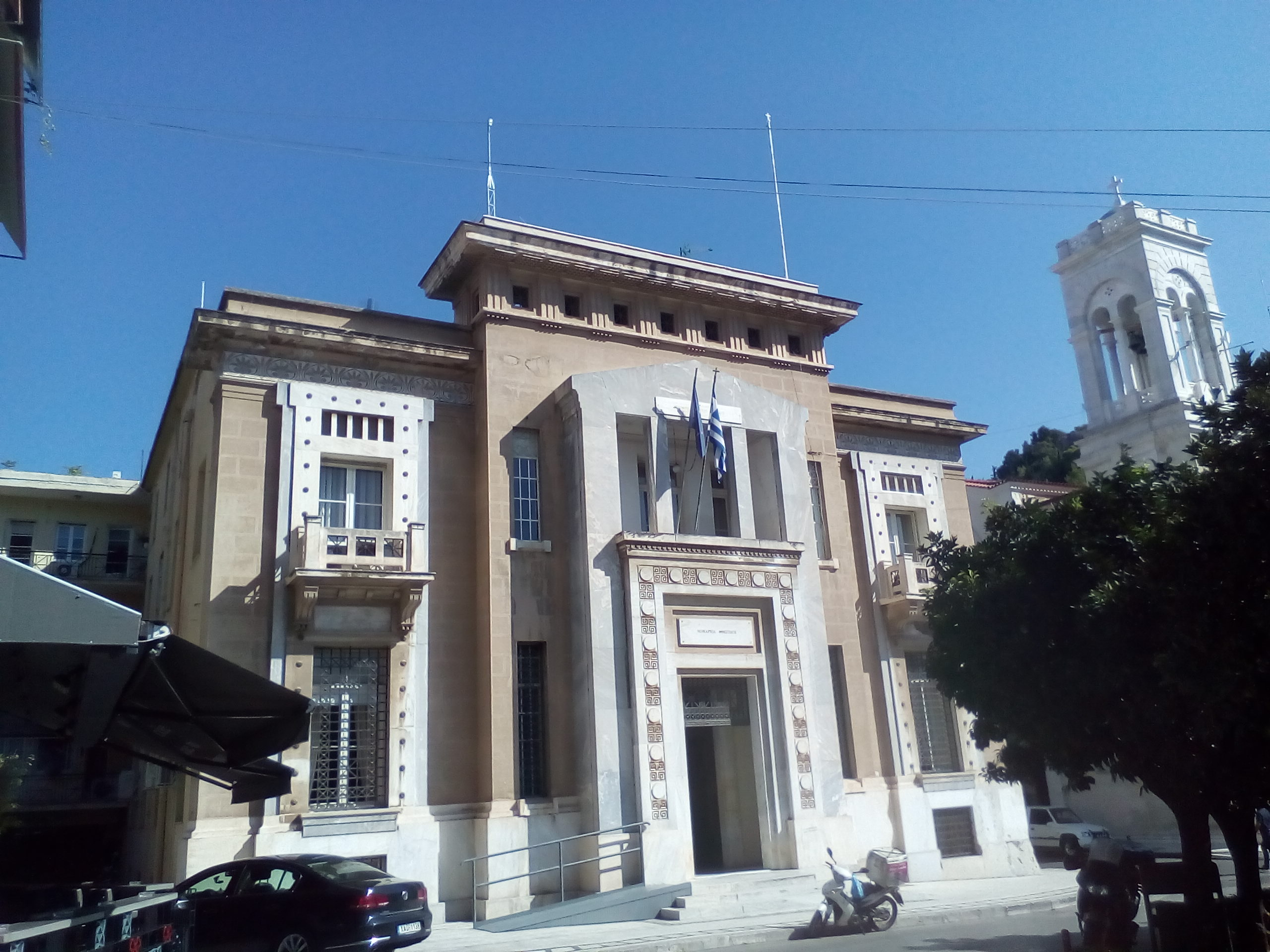
Mansion of the Central Greece Administration

== See also ==
- University of Central Greece
- List of settlements in Phthiotis
- List of traditional Greek place names

== Sources ==
- Kazhdan, Alexander (1991). "Lamia". In Kazhdan, Alexander (ed.). The Oxford Dictionary of Byzantium. Oxford and New York: Oxford University Press. p. 1171. ISBN 0-19-504652-8.
- Koder, Johannes; Hild, Friedrich (1976). Tabula Imperii Byzantini, Band 1: Hellas und Thessalia (in German). Vienna: Verlag der Österreichischen Akademie der Wissenschaften. ISBN 978-3-7001-0182-6.
- Van Tricht, Filip (2011). The Latin Renovatio of Byzantium: The Empire of Constantinople (1204–1228). Leiden: Brill. ISBN 978-90-04-20323-5.
- Πάλλης, Γιώργος (2020). Από τη Λαμία στο Ζητούνι: Ανασυνθέτοντας μια μικρή βυζαντινή πόλη. Αθήνα: Gutenberg. ISBN 978-960-01-2095-0.
- Papastathopoulou, Aristea. Η Λαμία κατά την Ελληνιστική περίοδο. ΘΕΜΑΤΑ ΑΡΧΑΙΟΛΟΓΙΑΣ 2020, 4(3): 358-371 (online).
