= Amédée Pofey =

Knight and lord of the Latin Empire and of the Kingdom of Thessalonica

Amédée Pofey or Amedeo Buffa (also Buffedus and Buffois) in the contemporary sources, was a knight and lord of the Latin Empire and of the Kingdom of Thessalonica.

Originally from Cologny, he became constable of the Kingdom of Thessalonica after its establishment and then grand constable of the Latin Empire of Constantinople. His latter title is attested from a document from 1208 wherein he donated his titles and possessions in Cologny to the Bishopric of Geneva.

== Sources ==
- Blondel, Louis (1939–42). "Amédée Pofey, de Cologny, grand connétable de Romanie". Bulletin de la Société d'histoire et d'archéologie de Genève (in French). VII: 384–386.
- Blondel, Louis (1947–50). "Amédée Pofey, de Cologny, grand connétable de Romanie". Bulletin de la Société d'histoire et d'archéologie de Genève (in French). IX: 177–200.
