= Demetrius of Montferrat =

King of Thessalonica (1205–1230)

- Byzantine style aspron trachy minted around 1204-1224

King of Thessalonica
- Reign: 1207–1224
- Predecessor: Boniface I, Marquis of Montferrat
- Successor: Conquered by Theodore Komnenos Doukas
- Born: 1205
- Died: 1230 (aged 24–25); Amalfi
- House: Aleramici
- Father: Boniface I, Marquis of Montferrat
- Mother: Margaret of Hungary

Demetrius or Demetrios of Montferrat (Italian: Demetrio di Monferrato; Greek: Δημήτριος Μομφερρατικός, Dēmētrios Momferratikos; 1205–1230) was King of Thessalonica from 1207 to 1224.

== Life ==
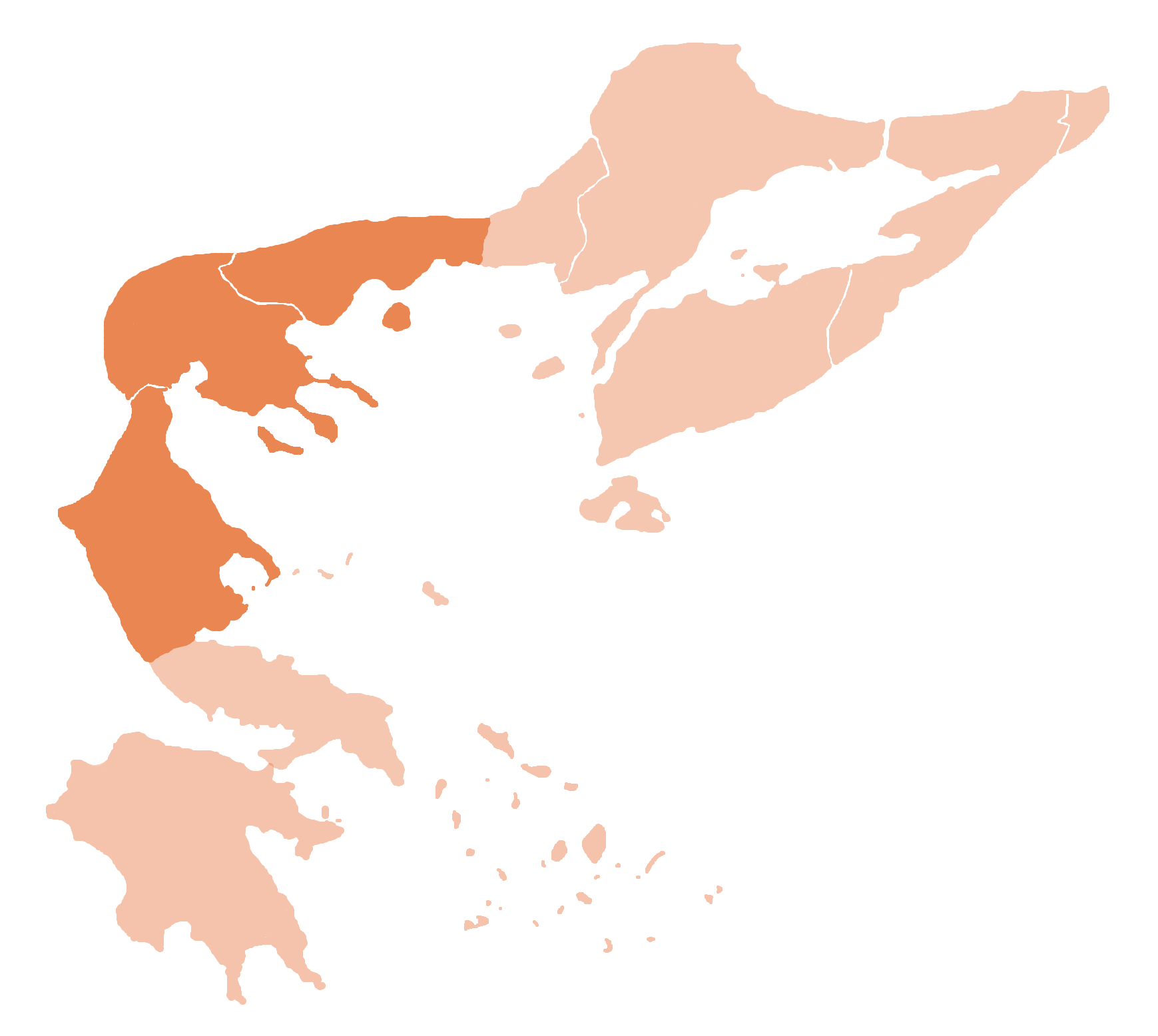
The Kingdom of Thessalonica (1204-1224), within the Latin Empire of Constantinople

Demetrius was the son of Marquis Boniface of Montferrat by Margaret of Hungary, the widow of Byzantine Emperor Isaac II Angelos (d. 1204). In the aftermath of the Fourth Crusade, Boniface had secured for himself the region of Macedonia in the division of the spoils, creating there the Kingdom of Thessalonica. Marrying the former Byzantine empress, he found it easier to attract support from the members of the Byzantine aristocracy. When Boniface's son was born in Thessalonica in 1205, he was named after Saint Demetrius, the patron saint of Thessalonica.

Boniface was killed in a battle against the Bulgarians in 1207, and Kaloyan of Bulgaria promptly besieged Thessalonica. The siege ended with Kaloyan's murder, but Demetrius' rule was not secure. Since he was a child, regency was held by his mother Margaret. Some of the most influential magnates of the kingdom conspired against the regency, plotting to replace the infant ruler with his half-brother, Marquis William VI of Montferrat. The Latin Emperor Henry of Flanders determined to stem this movement and advanced on Thessalonica in December 1208. The barons, led by Count Umberto II of Biandrate, shut the gates of the city before the emperor and issued several unreasonable demands. The emperor pretended to accept Biandrate's terms (provided that Margaret accepted them) long enough to gain entrance into the city. Margaret was then instructed to overrule the terms and Henry crowned young Demetrius king on January 6, 1209, extracting oaths of homage from the Lombard barons. The emperor's actions were confirmed by Pope Innocent III.

The rights of the young king were still threatened by Biandrate's Lombard garrisons of important fortresses like Serres and Kavala. Henry took Serres but Kavala held out. Hoping to reach a reconciliation, the emperor summoned the nobility of the Kingdom of Thessalonica to a parliament at Ravennika, but many lords did not submit. After further military action, Henry obtained the submission of Biandrate and the remaining Lombard lords. He defeated the Epirote attack on Thessalonica in 1210 and left his younger brother Eustace as regent for King Demetrius. The situation changed again on Henry's death in 1216.

The new Latin Emperor, Peter of Courtenay, was won over by the Lombard lords and invested William of Montferrat with the kingdom before leaving Italy. The Queen Mother Margaret and her son John Angelos (maternal half-brother of Demetrius), fled to Hungary, but Demetrius apparently remained in place, while the Emperor Peter was captured and eventually executed by Theodore Komnenos Doukas in Epirus.

Doukas exploited the dissension among the nobility in Thessalonica to gradually conquer the kingdom's fortified towns one after another. Although William of Montferrat proved unwilling to dispossess his half-brother, he agreed to lead a crusade to the relief of Thessalonica in 1222, and prepared to set out, sending ahead Umberto of Biandrate. Before the main force of this crusade reached Thessalonica, however, Theodore forced the surrender of the city in December 1224. Together with the Latin archbishop, King Demetrius fled to the court of Emperor Frederick II in Italy. He participated in Frederick's crusade to the Levant, and died in 1230 at Amalfi, after ceding his rights to Thessalonica to Frederick II.

Demetrius was married to Hermingarde, from the La Roche family that ruled the Duchy of Athens. Some earlier researchers assumed that Demetrius had children, or even grandchildren, but later scholars have shown that those presumed descendants were related to Demetrius in different ways, thus being just cousins.

== Sources ==
- Lock, Peter, The Franks in the Aegean 1204–1500, New York, 1995.
- Cheetham, Nicolas. Mediaeval Greece, Yale University Press, 1981.
- Van Tricht, Filip (2011). The Latin Renovatio of Byzantium: The Empire of Constantinople (1204–1228). Leiden-Boston: Brill. ISBN 978-90-04-20323-5.
- Van Tricht, Filip (2020). "Latin Emperors and Serbian Queens Anna and Helena: Genealogical and Geopolitical Explorations in the Post-1204 Byzantine World". Frankokratia. 1 (1–2): 56–107. doi:10.1163/25895931-12340002.
- Van Tricht, Filip (2022). "Being Byzantine in the post-1204 Empire of Constantinople: Continuity and change (politics, government, church and religion)" (PDF). Историјски часопис: The Historical Review. 71: 65–119. Archived from the original (PDF) on 11 April 2024.
- Van Tricht, Filip (2023). "Being Byzantine in the post-1204 Empire of Constantinople: Continuity and change (society and culture)" (PDF). Историјски часопис: The Historical Review. 72: 67–116. Archived from the original (PDF) on 12 June 2024.

| Preceded by Boniface | King of Thessalonica; 1207–1224 | Conquest by Theodore of Epirus |
| New title | — TITULAR — King of Thessalonica; 1224–1230 | Succeeded by Emperor Frederick II |
