= William VI of Montferrat =

Marquis of Montferrat (c. 1173–1225)

William VI

Marquis of Montferrat
- Reign: 1207–1226
- Predecessor: Boniface I, Marquis of Montferrat
- Successor: Boniface II, Marquis of Montferrat

Titular King of Thessalonica
- Reign: 1207–1226
- Predecessor: Boniface I, Marquis of Montferrat
- Successor: Boniface II, Marquis of Montferrat
- Born: c. 1173
- Died: 17 September 1225; Almyros
- Spouse: Berta di Clavesana
- Issue: Boniface II, Marquis of Montferrat; Beatrice of Montferrat, lady of Saint-Bonnet; Alice of Montferrat, Queen of Cyprus
- House: Aleramici
- Father: Boniface I, Marquis of Montferrat
- Mother: Elena del Bosco

William VI (c. 1173 – 17 September 1225) was the tenth Marquis of Montferrat from 1203 and titular King of Thessalonica from 1207.

== Biography ==
=== Youth ===
Coat-of-arms of Monferrat.

As Boniface I's eldest son, and his only son by his first wife, Helena del Bosco, William initially stood to inherit all his father's possessions. He participated in diverse campaigns with his father, including the Battle of Montiglio, in which the men of Asti were defeated in 1191. Between 1193 and 1199, he appeared in many of his father's public acts. On 12 June 1199, he was put in charge of Acqui Terme with twenty knights to combat the Alessandrini, and, on 27 October, he was present near Saluggia for the signing of a pact with the commune of Vercelli.

=== War with Asti ===
Boniface I joined the Fourth Crusade as a Christian leader in 1201. In accordance with promises made to Asti and Alessandria, he officially abdicated the marquisate to William before he left. Immediately, William turned towards Asti, then protected by Milan. The Astigiani had a history of rebellion and were growing in power. In August, with his father beside him, he formed an alliance with Alba and Alessandria, another rebellious commune, against Asti. His allies proved of little worth as he had to make many concessions to them and was still defeated in the field. In April 1206, he opened negotiations with Asti. The peace treaty was embarrassing for Montferrat, but it was accepted by all three allies. William promised to get his father's ratification, but his father was killed fighting against the Bulgarians unaware of any peace back home.

=== War against the Ghibellines ===
Traditionally, the Aleramici adhered to the Ghibelline faction, which supported the Hohenstaufen and their Italian schemes. William, however, lent his support to Otto of Brunswick, the Guelph claimant to the imperial title. Though William expected to see the power of an emperor levelled against his foes, the only aid he received from Otto was directed against small local potentates which posed little real threat. The only great success of the alliance was the sack of Cuneo.

At the Diet of Lodi, William abandoned Otto finally in favour of Frederick II, the Hohenstaufen claimant. On 15 July 1212, he was in Genoa with the other Ghibelline lords to receive Frederick. William led the young emperor from the city to the road which led to Germany. In 1215, William participated in the Fourth Lateran Council, there arguing the cause of Frederick against Otto. He travelled many subsequent times into Germany to speak to Frederick and during these absences, his enemies plotted against him. In their attempts to seize his lands, however, they were largely unsuccessful.

During his times in Italy, William remained at war with Asti and Alessandria, but without result.

=== Claims in Greece ===
Following his father's death in 1207, his conquests in Greece, formed into the Kingdom of Thessalonica, passed into the hands of William's half-brother Demetrius. The succession was opposed by the Lombard nobles of the kingdom, led by the regent Oberto II of Biandrate, who preferred the crown to pass to William. William himself was reluctant to claim the throne, and with the support of Latin Emperor Henry of Flanders, the rebellion of the Lombard barons was overcome, and Demetrius was crowned king.

During the exhausting years battling rebels and Guelphs, William at last resolved to travel to Greece to defend the conquests of his father. To this end he was urged by the churchmen of his realm and also by the troubadour Elias Cairel. When he finally decided to take the cross, aware of the insignificance of his contribution to the total effort, he decided to head by way of Egypt, at the suggestion of Pope Honorius III. But the arrival of Demetrius, fleeing the onslaught of the Greeks under Theodore Komnenos Doukas and the hostility of the Lombard barons, led by Biandrate, convinced him to go to Greece.

Several times he prepared to head out, but each time was detained by the threats of his enemies in Piedmont or by economic restraints which compelled him to mortgage his marquisate to Frederick II. Finally, he cowed some cities into giving him aid in men. Nevertheless, he was present at Capua, Ferentino, and Sora with Frederick II in February 1223. Delayed again and again, he drank a toast at Brindisi to his setting off in 1224, but he fell ill at the last minute. His fleet remained in port until the spring of 1225, when, under urging from Honorius, it finally cast off. The delays had been fatal and William himself died at Almyros in September 1225. The rest of his army was hit by a dysentery epidemic and melted away.

== Marriages and children ==
On 9 August 1202 William married Berta (1182–1224), daughter of Marquis Bonifacio di Clavesana, count of Cortemiglia. They had at least three children:

- Boniface II, Marquis of Montferrat (born circa 1203, date of death unknown).
- Beatrice (circa 1210–1274), lady of Saint-Bonnet in her own right. She married three times:
  - On 15 November 1219, Guigues VI of Viennois
  - In 1252, Guy II, lord of Bauge
  - Pierre de la Roue
- Alice (circa 1215–1232), married in May 1229 King Henry I of Cyprus.

== Sources ==
- Barker, John W. (2017). "Crusading and Matrimony in the Dynastic Policies of Montferrat and Savoy". Byzantion Nea Hellás. 36. Centro de Estudios Griegos Bizantinos y Neohelénicos.
- Murray, Alan V., ed. (2006). "William VI of Montferrat". The Crusades: An Encyclopedia. Vol. 4. ABC-CLIO.
- Caravale, Mario (ed). Dizionario Biografico degli Italiani: LX Grosso – Guglielmo da Forlì. Rome, 2003.
- Marchesi di Monferrato: Guglielmo VI.
- Wolff, Robert Lee (1969). "The Latin Empire of Constantinople, 1204-1261". In Wolff, Robert Lee; Hazard, Harry W. (eds.). A History of the Crusades. The University of Wisconsin Press. pp. 187–234.

Preceded by Boniface I	Marquis of Montferrat; 1207–1226	Succeeded by Boniface II
