= Oberto II of Biandrate =

Italian Count and a participant in the Fourth Crusade

Oberto, Uberto, or Umberto II (English: Humbert) was the Count of Biandrate (Blan-Dras) in Lombardy and a participant in the Fourth Crusade.

Oberto was a companion of Boniface of Montferrat on the Fourth Crusade. After Boniface' elevation to King of Thessalonica and his death, Oberto became acting regent for his son Demetrius (1207–1209). Immediately, Oberto and Amedeo Buffa, the constable of Thessalonica, began to plot the overthrow of Demetrius. They intended to put William VI of Montferrat, Boniface' elder son, on the throne. However, the Emperor Henry marched on Thessalonica to force the Lombard lords to do him homage on Demetrius' behalf, but Oberto closed the gates to him. He demanded the whole of Epirus from the Vardar river (in Macedonia) to the Adriatic and a corridor to the Black Sea going west of Philippopolis, which Henry accepted on condition that Margaret, Boniface' widow, would agree to it. Upon his entry into the city, he convinced her to refuse it and thus disempowered Oberto and Amadeo. He imprisoned Oberto in the castle of Serres under the guard of Berthold II, Count of Katzenelnbogen, but later released him. Oberto went to Negroponte and plotted against the emperor, but Ravano dalle Carceri, lord of that island and a former confederate of Biandrate, protected the emperor and Oberto quickly surrendered and returned to Montferrat, where he sought to convince William to claim Thessalonica.

Oberto has been accused of subsequently poisoning Henry, who died in 1216 at Thessalonica. In 1224, according to Pope Honorius III, Oberto and William were headed east to relieve besieged Thessalonica, but it fell to the Despotate of Epirus before they arrived.

== Ancestors ==
Ancestors of Oberto II of Biandrate

16. Count Wido of Ivrea
8. Otto of Ivrea, count of Pombia and Biandrate
17.
4. Oberto I, count of Biandrate
18.
9.
19.
2. Guido, count of Biandrate, patrician from Milan
20.
10.
21.
5. Unknown
22.
11.
23.
1. Oberto II, count of Biandrate
24. Otto II, Marquess of Montferrat
12. William IV, Marquess of Montferrat
25. Constance of Savoy
6. Rainier, Marquess of Montferrat
26.
13. Otta di Aglié
27.
3. Isabella of Montferrat
28. Reginald I, Count of Burgundy
14. William I, Count of Burgundy
29. Alice of Normandy
7. Gisela of Burgundy, Marchioness of Montferrat
30.
15. Stephanie
31.

== Sources ==
- Setton, Kenneth M.; Wolff, Robert Lee; Hazard, Harry W., eds. (1969) [1962]. A History of the Crusades, Volume II: The Later Crusades, 1189–1311 (Second ed.). Madison, Milwaukee, and London: University of Wisconsin Press. ISBN 0-299-04844-6.
- Lock, Peter. The Franks in the Aegean 1204 – 1500. New York, 1995.
- Cheetham, Nicholas. Mediaeval Greece. Yale University Press, 1981.
- Bury, John B. "The Lombards and Venetians in Euboia (1205-1303)." Journal of Hellenic Studies, Vol. 7. (1886), pp. 309–352.
