= Ravennika =

Medieval settlement in Central Greece

Ravennika or Ravenica (Greek: Ραβέννικα or Ραβένικα) was a medieval settlement in Central Greece.

Ravennika is first mentioned as "Rovinaca" by the Jewish traveller Benjamin of Tudela, who reported 100 Jewish families there. The name is most likely of Slavic origin, its meaning is similar to "plain". Its exact location is unclear, but from the literary references it appears to have been near the mouths of the Spercheios River, south of Lamia.

The town was the scene of two parliaments held by the Latin Emperor Henry of Flanders, one in 1209 to receive the submission of the rebellious Crusader lords of the Kingdom of Thessalonica and southern Greece, and the second in 1210 to settle the disputes between the Crusader lords and the Roman Catholic Church prelates in Greece.

== Sources ==
- Koder, Johannes; Hild, Friedrich (1976). Tabula Imperii Byzantini, Band 1: Hellas und Thessalia (in German). Vienna: Verlag der Österreichischen Akademie der Wissenschaften. ISBN 3-7001-0182-1.
