= Kingdom of Thessalonica =

Short-lived Crusader State in Thessaly and Macedon

Coordinates: 40°38′N 22°57′E

Kingdom of Thessalonica Regnum Thessalonicae (Latin)
- 1204–1224
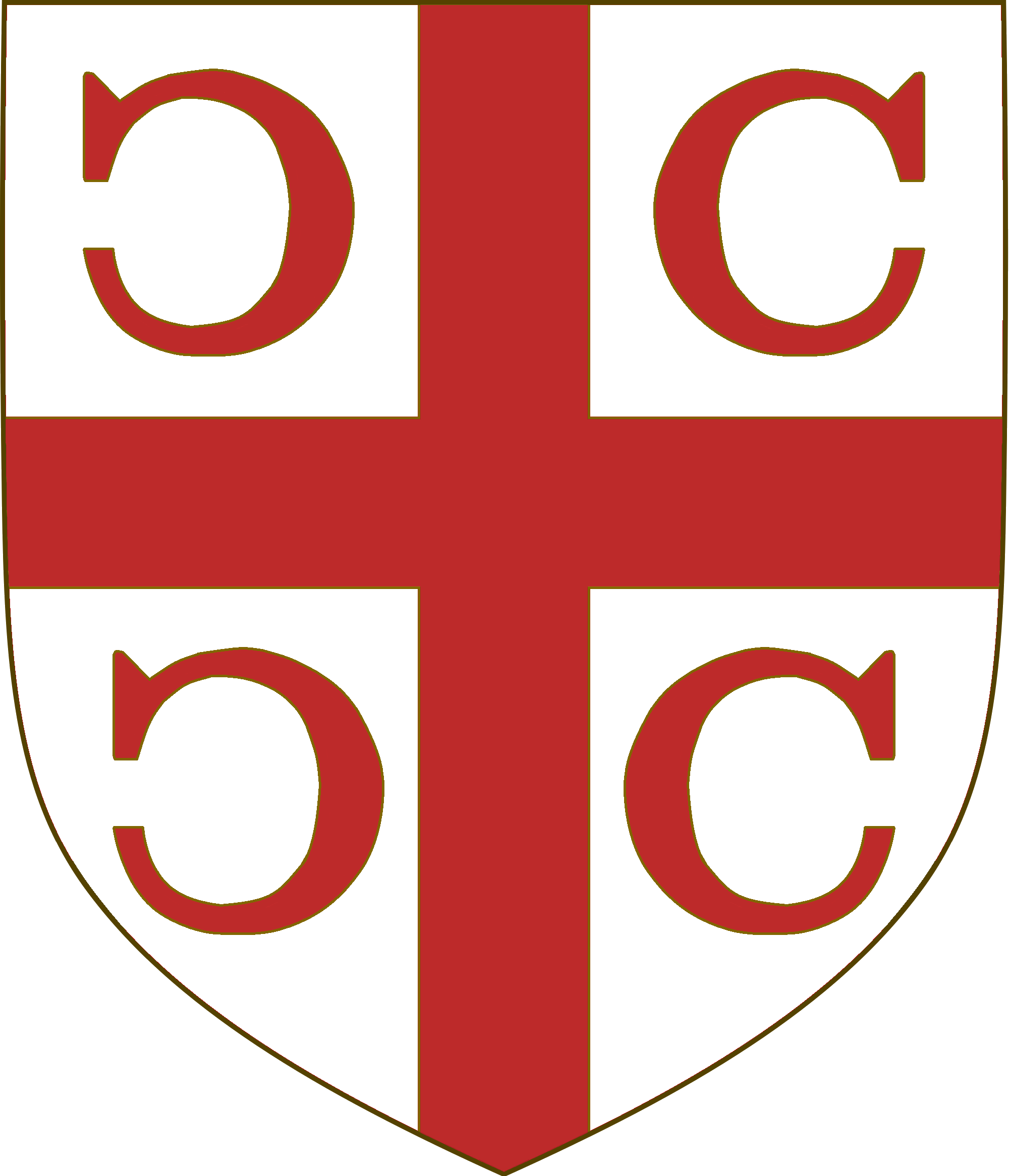
- Coat of Arms per The Lord Marshal's Roll (1295)

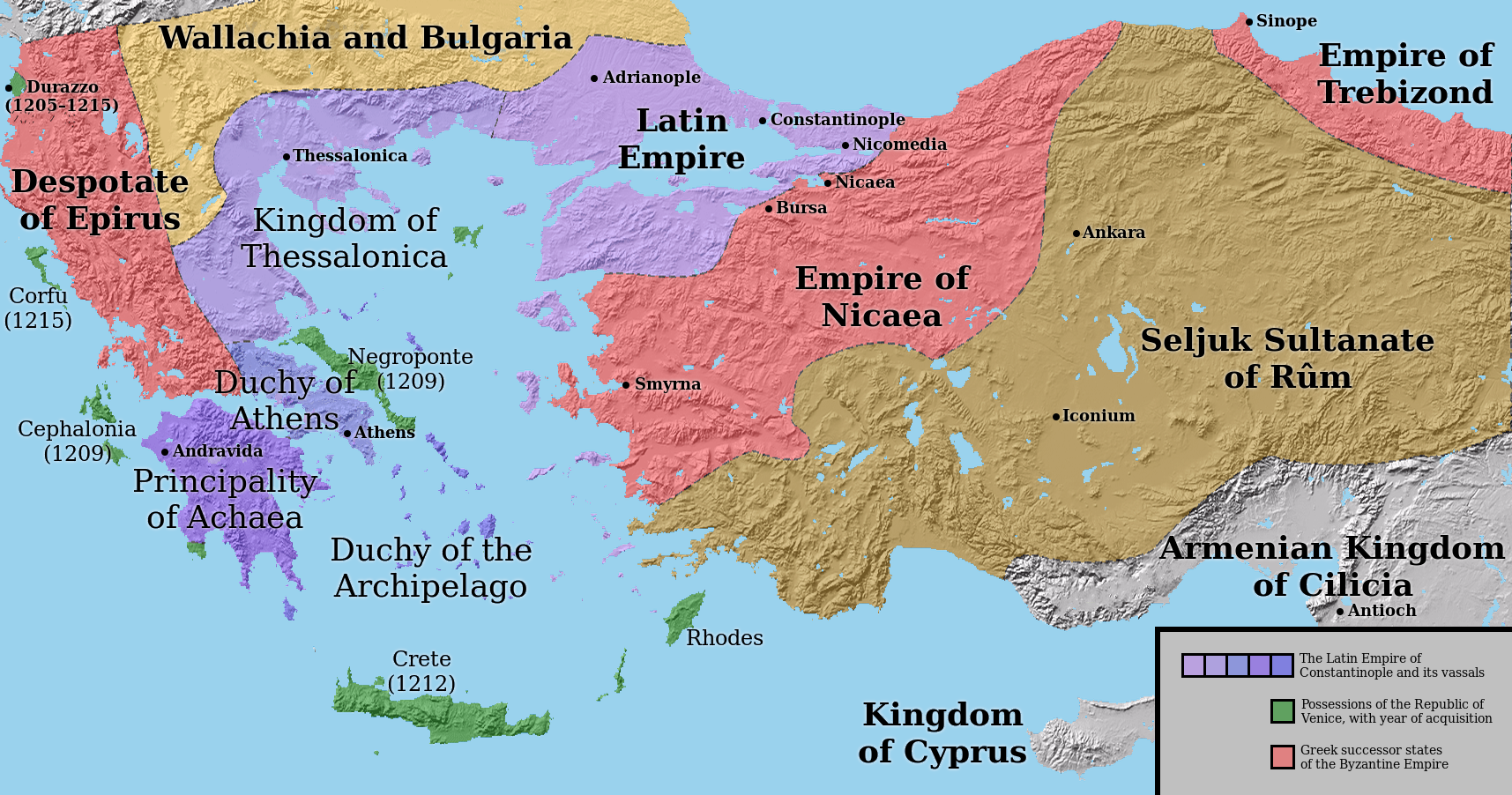
- The Kingdom of Thessalonica in 1204 as a vassal of the Latin Empire
- Status: Vassal of the Latin Empire
- Capital: Thessalonica
- Common languages: Latin (official); Greek (popular)
- Religion: Roman Catholic (official); Eastern Orthodox (popular)
- Government: Feudal Monarchy
- King of Thessalonica
  - 1205–1207: Boniface
  - 1207–1224: Demetrius
- Historical era: Middle Ages
  - Kingdom established: 1204
  - Fall of Thessalonica to Epirus: 1224
Preceded by	Succeeded by
Byzantine Empire (Angelos dynasty)	Empire of Thessalonica

The Kingdom of Thessalonica (Greek: Βασίλειον τῆς Θεσσαλονίκης, romanized: Vasílion tis Thessaloníkis) was a short-lived Crusader State established as a vassal of the Latin Empire following the Fourth Crusade. It was formed from the partition of Byzantine lands in today's territory of Northern Greece with Thessalonica as its capital. The kingdom faced continual pressure from neighboring powers and collapsed after the Despotate of Epirus conquered it in 1224.

== History ==
=== Background ===
After the Sack of Constantinople by the Crusaders in 1204, the Byzantine Empire's territories were partitioned among the Crusaders and the Byzantine rump states, Nicaea and Trebizond, which immediately challenged the authority of the Latins. Boniface of Montferrat, the leader of the crusade, hoped to become the new emperor. However, the Venetians, who had largely funded the crusade, viewed him as ambitious, noted his ties to their rival Genoa, and were wary of his family's connections to the Byzantine court; his brother Conrad of Montferrat had married into the Byzantine dynasty. The Venetians, instead, voted for Baldwin of Flanders, who was elected as emperor of the new Latin Empire.

=== Establishment ===
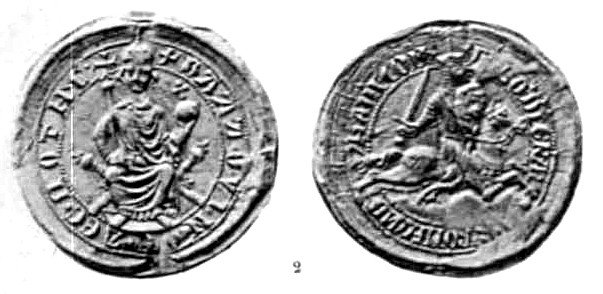
Seal of Baldwin as emperor

Boniface was assigned to a large fief in Anatolia, but he, wanting a fief in Europe, demanded Thessalonica, the second-largest Byzantine city after Constantinople. Late 13th and 14th century sources suggest that Boniface based his claim to Thessalonica on the statement that his younger brother Renier had been granted Thessalonica on his marriage to Maria Komnene in 1180. He set out to Thessalonica, however, Emperor Baldwin changed his mind and took control of the city before the arrival of Boniface. In response, Boniface moved against the Emperor's possessions by taking Didymoteicho and besieging Adrianople. The two men sought peace, with Boniface receiving Thessalonica and returning Didymoteicho to the emperor.

In 1204–05, Boniface extended his rule south into Greece, advancing through Thessaly, Boeotia, Euboea, and Attica. The boundaries of the actual Kingdom of Thessalonica seem to have extended only up to Domokos, Pharsalus, and Velestino: southern Thessaly, with the towns of Zetounion and Ravennika, was under governors appointed by the Latin Emperor, and the principalities of southern Greece were only Boniface's feudal vassals. Emperor Henry of Flanders' expedition against the rebellious Lombard barons of Thessalonica in 1208–09 ended the feudal dependency of the southern principalities—the Duchy of Athens, the Marquisate of Bodonitsa, the Lordship of Salona, and the Triarchy of Negroponte—on Thessalonica, replacing it with direct imperial suzerainty.

=== The Lombard Rebellion ===
Boniface's rule lasted less than two years before he was ambushed by Tsar Kaloyan of Bulgaria and killed on September 4, 1207. The kingdom passed to Boniface's son Demetrius, who was still a baby, so actual power was held by various minor nobles of Lombard origin. Under the regent Oberto, these nobles began plotting to place William VI of Montferrat, Boniface's elder son, on the throne and openly defied the Latin Emperor Henry of Flanders. Henry marched against them in 1209 and forced their submission. As a result, Henry's brother Eustace then became regent for Demetrius.

=== War with Epirus and fall ===
Michael I of Epirus, a former ally of Boniface, attacked the kingdom in 1210, as did the Bulgarians. Henry of Flanders eventually defeated both, but after Michael's death in 1214, his brother and successor Theodore began the assault on the kingdom anew. Over the next nine years, Theodore gradually conquered all of Thessalonica except the city itself, as the Latin Empire could spare no army to defend it while it fought the Empire of Nicaea in Asia Minor. In 1224, just as Demetrius had become old enough to take power for himself, Theodore finally captured Thessalonica and the kingdom became part of the Despotate of Epirus.

=== Titular claimants ===
The kingdom was claimed by titular kings of the house of Montferrat until 1284 and also by the dukes of Burgundy; Baldwin II of Constantinople had promised the title to Hugh IV should he regain the Latin Empire.

== Bibliography ==
=== Primary ===
- The Old French Chronicle of Morea: An Account of Frankish Greece after the Fourth Crusade. Translated by Van Arsdall, Anne; Moody, Helen. Routledge. 2018 [14th century]. ISBN 9781134797462.

=== Secondary ===
- Barker, John W. (2003). "Late Byzantine Thessalonike: A Second City's Challenges and Responses". Dumbarton Oaks Papers. 57: 5–33. doi:10.2307/1291874. JSTOR 1291874.
- Bury, John B. (1886). "The Lombards and Venetians in Euboia (1205-1303)". Journal of Hellenic Studies. 7: 309–352. JSTOR 623649.
- Curta, Florin, ed. (2022). The Routledge Handbook of East Central and Eastern Europe in the Middle Ages, 500-1300. London/New York: Routledge.
- Fine, John VA. (1994). The Late Medieval Balkans: A Critical Survey from the Late Twelfth Century to the Ottoman Conquest. Mischigan: University of Michigan Press. ISBN 0-472-08260-4.
- Giebfried, John (2023). "Crusader Constantinople's crucified constable?". Revista de Estudios Bizantinos. 11: 53–68. doi:10.37536/ebizantinos.2023.11.2392. hdl:10017/60255.
- Haberstumpf, Walter (1995), Dinastie europee nel Mediterraneo orientale. I Monferrato e i Savoia nei secoli XII–XV, Torino
- Queller, Donald E.; Madden, Thomas F.; Andrea, Alfred J. (1999). The Fourth Crusade, The Conquest of Constantinople. Philadelphia: University of Pennsylvania Press. ISBN 9780812217131.
- Runciman, Steven (1951–1954). A History of the Crusades. Vol. 1–3. Cambridge: Cambridge University Press.
- Van Tricht, Filip (2011). The Latin Renovatio of Byzantium: The Empire of Constantinople (1204–1228). Leiden: Brill. ISBN 978-90-04-20323-5.
