= Pallavicini =

Pallavicini (pronounced [pallaviˈtʃiːni]) is a surname from Northwest Italy, derived from a medieval given name. Notable people with the name include:

- the following members of the noble Pallavicini family:
  - Agostino Pallavicini (1577–1649), Doge of Genoa and King of Corsica
  - Albert Pallavicini (died 1311), marquess of Bodonitsa
  - Alerame Maria Pallavicini (1730–1805), Doge of Genoa
  - Antonio Pallavicini Gentili (1441–1507), Italian Roman Catholic cardinal
  - Caterina Imperiale Lercari Pallavicini (fl. 1721), Italian poet
  - Elvina Pallavicini (1914–2004), Italian noblewoman
  - Francesco Sforza Pallavicini (1607–1667), Italian Roman Catholic cardinal and intellectual
  - Gerolamo Pallavicini (died 1503), Italian Roman Catholic prelate
  - Gian Luca Pallavicini (1697–1773), Italian nobleman, field marshal and diplomat
  - Guglielma Pallavicini (died 1358), marchioness of Bodonitsa
  - Guy Pallavicini (died 1237), marquess of Bodonitsa
  - Irene Pallavicini (1811–1877), Hungarian-born German noblewoman
  - Isabella Pallavicini (died 1286), marchioness of Bodonitsa
  - Jerónimo Grimaldi y Pallavicini, 1st Duke of Grimaldi (1710–1789), Spanish diplomat and politician
  - Johann von Pallavicini (1848–1941), Austro-Hungarian nobleman and diplomat
  - Lazzaro Pallavicini (1602/1603–1680), Italian Roman Catholic cardinal
  - Lazzaro Opizio Pallavicini (1719–1785), Italian Roman Catholic cardinal
  - Opisto Pallavicini (1632–1700), Italian Roman Catholic prelate
  - Thomas Pallavicini (fl. 13th century), marquess of Bodonitsa
  - Ubertino Pallavicini (died 1278), marquess of Bodonitsa
  - Uberto Pallavicini (1197–1269), Italian field captain of the Holy Roman Empire
- Abd al Wahid Pallavicini (1926–2017), Italian Sufist
- Carlo Pallavicini (1630–1688), Italian composer
- Francesco Rospigliosi Pallavicini (1828–1887), Italian politician
- Giancarlo Pallavicini (born 1931), Italian writer and academic
- Jean Charles Pallavicini (1911–1999), Italian member of the Sovereign Military Order of Malta
- Piersandro Pallavicini (born 1962), Italian chemist, writer and academic
- Stefano Benedetto Pallavicini (1672–1742), Italian poet and librettist
- Vito Pallavicini (1924–2007) was an Italian lyricist

Pallavicini is also the namesake of the following places:

- Palais Pallavicini, a palace in Vienna, Austria
- Palazzo Pallavicini, several palaces in Italy
- Villa Pallavicini, several villas in Italy

== See also ==
- Pallavicino
- Paravicini
- Parravicini
