= Saint Omer =

Saint Omer or St Omer most commonly refers to:

- St Omer, the common name of Saint Audomar (died c. 670)

Saint Omer or Saint-Omer may also refer to:

== People ==
- Godfrey de Saint-Omer (12th century), one of the 12th century founders of the Knights Templar
- Walter of Saint Omer (died 1174), Prince of Galilee
- Nicholas I of Saint Omer (11??–121?), French knight
- Bela of Saint Omer (died 1258), Lord of one half of Thebes
- Nicholas II of Saint Omer (died 1294), Lord of one half of Thebes
- Otho of Saint Omer (died 1299), Lord of one half of Thebes
- John of Saint Omer (13th century), Marshal of Achaea
- Nicholas III of Saint Omer (died 1314), Lord of one half of Thebes and Marshal of Achaea
- Joy St. Omer (2001/2002–2026), Saint Lucian murder victim

== Places ==
=== Canada ===
- Saint-Omer, Quebec, a town in L'Islet Regional County Municipality
- Saint-Omer, Gaspésie–Îles-de-la-Madeleine, Quebec

=== France ===
- Saint-Omer, Calvados
- Saint-Omer-en-Chaussée, Oise
- Saint-Omer, Pas-de-Calais
- Saint-Omer-Capelle, Pas-de-Calais

=== Other places ===
- St. Omer, a village in the municipality of Suhlendorf, Germany
- Saint Omer, Indiana, United States

== Other ==
- Saint Omer (film), 2022 film by Alice Diop
- Sant Omer, a similarly named composer of Trecento music
- College of St. Omer, a Catholic school that operated from about 1594 to 1793
- Battle of Saint-Omer, Hundred Years War, 1340
- Hours of Saint-Omer, illuminated manuscript of c. 1320
- Siege of Saint-Omer, Thirty Years War, 1638
