= Mendenitsa =

Mendenitsa Μενδενίτσα
- Community
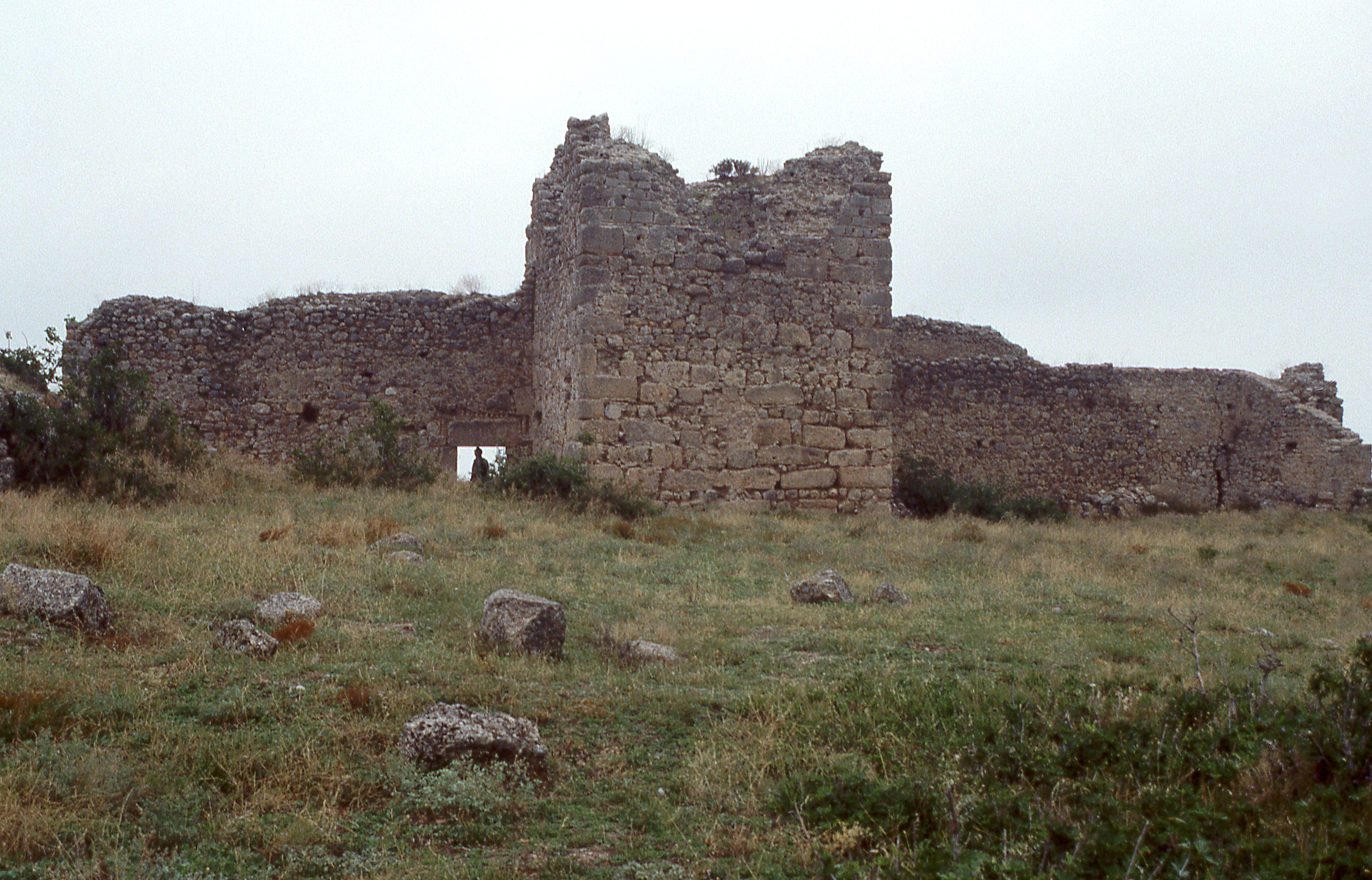
- The ruins of the medieval castle of Mendenitsa

- Location within Greece
- Coordinates: 38°45′N 22°37′E
- Country: Greece
- Administrative region: Central Greece
- Regional unit: Phthiotis
- Municipality: Kamena Vourla
- Municipal unit: Molos

Population (2021)
  - Community: 297
- Time zone: UTC+2 (EET)
  - Summer (DST): UTC+3 (EEST)
- Postal code: 350 09
- Vehicle registration: ΜΙ

Mendenitsa (Greek: Μενδενίτσα), in the Middle Ages known as Mountonitsa (Μουντονίτσα) and Bodonitsa, Boudonitsa, or Vodonitsa (Βοδονίτσα), is a village in Phthiotis, Greece. Along with the nearby village of Karavidia, it forms a community in the municipal unit of Molos.

== History ==
The village is located on the northern slopes of Mount Kallidromon, some 6 km southeast of Thermopylae. The early history of the settlement is obscure; it was likely a Slavic settlement of the middle Byzantine period.

Mendenitsa only appears in the sources during the late Middle Ages, as the seat of the Marquisate of Bodonitsa, a Frankish Crusader state established in 1204 to guard the strategic pass of Thermopylae, that connected northern and southern Greece. Its first ruler, Guido Pallavicini, also built the castle, possibly located on the site of an ancient acropolis, often identified with that of the city of Pharygai. The Chronicle of the Morea reports that the original fief was granted by Boniface of Montferrat, King of Thessalonica, but following the recovery of Thessaly by the Greek Despotate of Epirus, it was soon cut off from Thessalonica, and formed indeed the northernmost march of the Latin states of southern Greece. By the middle of the century, the marquess became a vassal of the Principality of Achaea, and ranked among the twelve foremost barons of that realm.

Bodonitsa also became the residence of the Bishopric of Thermopylae, which came under Roman Catholic control after 1204. After two successive bishops had been killed by pirate attacks, in 1209 the bishop moved from the exposed coastal site to Bodonitsa; by the early 14th century the see had assumed its name in its title (eglise de la Bondenice). There was also a local Greek Orthodox see, a suffragan of Larissa in the 14th century and of Athens thereafter.

The fifth marquess, Albert Pallavicini, married Maria dalle Carceri, thereby connecting the marquisate to the Triarchy of Negroponte and ultimately to Venetian interests. Consequently, when the Catalan Company seized the Duchy of Athens in 1311, following the Battle of Halmyros—where, among the flower of the Frankish nobility of Greece, margrave Albert fell as well—Bodonitsa was able to survive by becoming a Venetian protectorate, although now Bodonitsa was also considered a feudatory of Athens, and a tribute was paid to the Catalan vicars-general. Venetian support was unable to prevent the plundering of the marquisate by the Aydinid Turks under Umur Bey in 1332, however.

When the first husband of the marchioness Guglielma Pallavicini died, she even asked Venice to choose a new husband for her: Nicholas I Zorzi, who married Guglielma in 1335. The couple fell out, and the headstrong marchioness evicted her husband from Bodonitsa, but his son Francis Zorzi continued the new dynasty's rule over Bodonitsa. The collapse of Catalan rule in 1388 liberated Bodonitsa from its tribute to Athens, but in 1394 a new and more dangerous appeared in the person of the Ottoman Sultan Bayezid I, who conquered most of Greece, including the nearby County of Salona. Bodonitsa was spared, possibly because of its Venetian connections, and agreed to pay tribute. Bayezid's death in the Battle of Ankara in 1402 gained a respite, that proved brief: already in 1408, the marquess Jacob Zorzi arranged for many of his subjects and their animals to find refuge at Karystos, and in 1410 the Ottomans invaded the marquisate and laid siege to Bodonitsa. The siege lasted until 20 June 1414, when the castle was captured and razed. The Venetians demanded its return to the exiled Nicholas III Zorzi at Karystos, without success; Nicholas III and his descendants continued to claim the marquisate until Euboea, and Karystos with it, fell to the Ottomans in 1470. During the Ottoman Era the town was recorded as Modoniçe. In 1507 (Hijri 912) it was inhabited only by Muslims, and had 33 households; it was a zeamet of Ahmed Kalkandelenlü (of Tetovo) and Yusuf son of Kara Ahmed.

It is possible that the castle of Mendenitsa is to be identified with the Vriokastro (Βριόκαστρο) of later portolans.

== The remains of the castle ==
The visible remains of the castle of Bodonitsa consist of two concentric fortified enclosures. The broadly oval outer circuit measures ca. 240 m along the longer axis from southeast to northwest; the inner circuit, which occupies the summit of the hill and has the form of a narrower, more elongated oval, measures ca. 130 m from southeast to northwest, with a maximum width of ca. 35 m. The area enclosed by the inner circuit is divided into two parts by an east–west cross wall with a central tower and a single gate that provides entrance to the inner keep, at the northern end of the enclosure. This is the best preserved part of the structure, with walls between 1.50–2.50 m thick, still standing to a considerable height. Both circuit walls incorporate many ancient blocks, especially in their lower courses; these large rectangular blocks are easily distinguished from the medieval masonry of the upper walls.

== Sources ==
- Bon, Antoine (1937). "Forteresses médiévales de la Grèce centrale". Bulletin de correspondance hellénique. 61: 136–208. doi:10.3406/bch.1937.2728.
- Koder, Johannes; Hild, Friedrich (1976). Tabula Imperii Byzantini, Band 1: Hellas und Thessalia (in German). Vienna: Verlag der Österreichischen Akademie der Wissenschaften. ISBN 978-3-7001-0182-6.
- Miller, William (1908). "The Marquisate of Boudonitza (1204–1414)". Journal of Hellenic Studies. 28 (2): 234–249. doi:10.2307/624608. JSTOR 624608. S2CID 162336648.
