= Anthony le Flamenc =

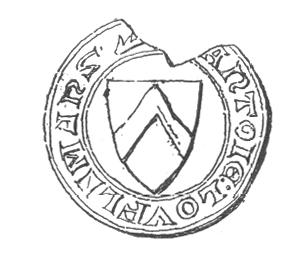
Seal of Anthony le Flamenc

Anthony le Flamenc (French: Antoine le Flamenc, Italian: Antonio Fiammengo, Latin: Antonius Flamengo, Greek: Αντώνιος Λε Φλαμά; fl. 1303–13) was an early 14th-century Frankish knight and lord of Karditsa (now Akraifnio) in the region of Boeotia, in the Duchy of Athens.

== Life ==
Anthony le Flamenc was of Flemish ancestry (as his surname indicates), and his forefathers had long been settled in the Holy Land before he rose to prominence in Frankish Greece. The eminent 19th-century scholar of the Frankish rule in Greece, Karl Hopf, suggested that he was the husband and co-ruler of Isabella Pallavicini, lady of the March of Bodonitsa until her death in 1286, after which he disputed the succession to the march with her cousin Thomas Pallavicini. However, as William Miller pointed out, this was pure conjecture lacking any basis in contemporary sources.

Le Flamenc is mentioned for the first time in 1303, when the French version of the Chronicle of the Morea records that the Duke of Athens Guy II de la Roche appointed him as his deputy (bailli) over Thessaly, a territory which had come under Guy's protection after its Greek ruler, Guy's uncle Constantine Doukas, died and left his underage son John II Doukas under Guy's tutelage. Anthony's son John, also received a post in Thessaly. Miller comments that it was possibly their experience with the Vlachs of the region that recommended them for such an important assignment. Anthony is also known to have had estates at nearby Koroneia and Patricio, possibly to be identified with the modern village of Ypsilantis, where a medieval tower is located.

Anthony was apparently held in high esteem: the Chronicle of the Morea calls him not only "the wisest of the duchy", but "one of the wisest men in Romania [Latin Greece]". Indeed, he is the sole member of the lower nobility of the Duchy of Athens to be mentioned in the sources.

He was a loyal follower of Matilda of Hainaut, the wife of Guy II. In 1305 he was among the witnesses to a deed relating to her property in the Low Countries (from which both of them hailed) and he was present with his son at her second engagement with Charles of Taranto in Thebes on 2 April 1309. In 1308, the Republic of Venice accused Anthony, Guy, Rocaforte, and Boniface of Verona of plotting to seize the Venetian colony of Negroponte.

On 15 March 1311, Anthony fought in the Battle of Halmyros against the Catalan Company and was one of the few survivors, though he was captured and held for ransom, as implied by the presence of his name in a list of correspondents of the Venetian authorities in 1313. Anthony built the Church of Saint George at Karditsa soon after his return from captivity, as attested by a donor's inscription, probably, as Miller suggests, commissioned by Anthony in fulfilment of a vow taken before the battle.

== Sources ==
- Lock, Peter (1986). "The Frankish Towers of Central Greece". The Annual of the British School at Athens. 81: 101–123. doi:10.1017/S0068245400020104.
- Miller, William (1909). "The Frankish Inscription at Karditza". The Journal of Hellenic Studies. 29 (2): 198–201. doi:10.2307/624683. JSTOR 624683.
- Miller, William (1921). Essays on the Latin Orient. Cambridge: Cambridge University Press. OCLC 457893641.
