= Bartolomeo Zaccaria =

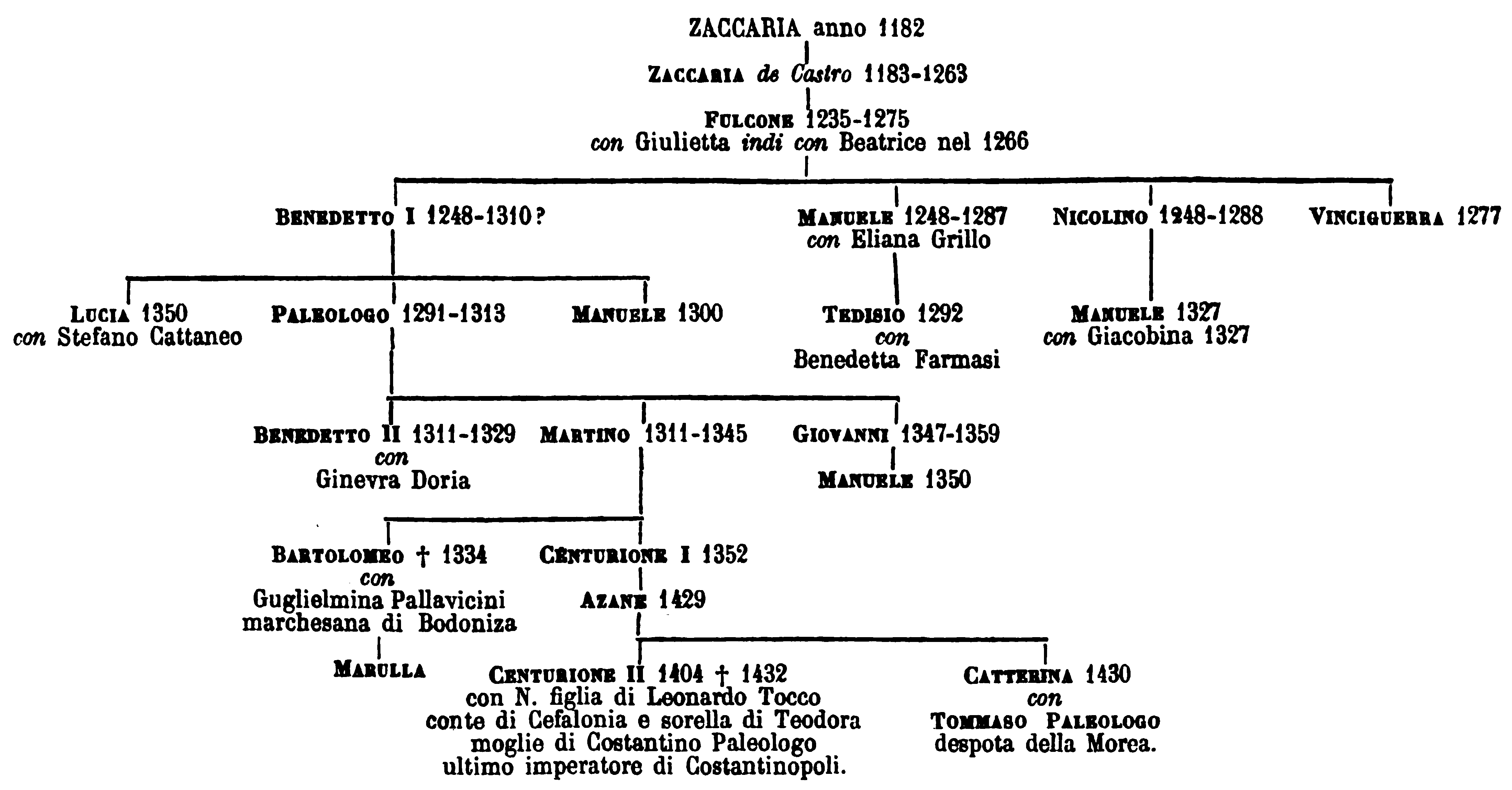
Family tree of the Zaccaria family in Latin Greece

Bartolomeo (or Bartolommeo) Zaccaria (died 1334) was the first husband of Guglielma Pallavicini (married 1327) and thus Marquess of Bodonitsa in her right. He also carried the title Lord of Damala during his lifetime.

As the eldest son of Martino Zaccaria, born into the Genoese Zaccaria family which ruled Chios, Bartolomeo was a fitting match for the highborn Frankish heiress, who co-ruled with her mother, Maria dalle Carceri, and stepfather, Andrea Cornaro. As a youth, he was forced to help raise a ransom for his captured father.

During a Catalan invasion, Bartolomeo was captured and carted off to a Sicilian prison. Only by the beseeching of Pope John XXII was he released.

He was still young when he died, though he left a daughter named Marulla.

== Sources ==
- Miller, William (1921). "The Marquisate of Boudonitza". Essays on the Latin Orient. Cambridge: Cambridge University Press. pp. 245–261.
