= Pallavicino =

Pallavicino (pronounced [pallaviˈtʃiːno]) is an Italian surname, derived from a medieval given name. Notable people with the name include:

- the following members of the noble Pallavicini family:
  - Antonio Pallavicino (1441–1507), Italian Roman Catholic cardinal
  - Battista Pallavicino (died 1466), Italian Roman Catholic prelate
  - Benedetto Pallavicino (1551–1601), Italian composer and organist
  - Carlo Pallavicino (died 1497), Italian Roman Catholic prelate
  - Cipriano Pallavicino (1509–1585), Italian Roman Catholic prelate
  - Ferrante Pallavicino (1615–1644), Italian writer
  - Francesco Sforza Pallavicino (1607–1667), Italian Roman Catholic cardinal and intellectual
  - Gian Carlo Pallavicino (1722–1794), Doge of Genoa
  - Gianluca Pallavicino (1697–1773), Italian nobleman, field marshal and diplomat
  - Giovanni Battista Pallavicino (1480–1524), Italian Roman Catholic cardinal
  - Lazzaro Pallavicino (1602/1603–1680), Italian Roman Catholic cardinal
  - Lazzaro Opizio Pallavicino (1719–1785), Italian Roman Catholic cardinal
  - Oberto Pallavicino (1197–1269), Italian field captain of the Holy Roman Empire
  - Opisto Pallavicino (1632–1700), Italian Roman Catholic prelate
- Carlo Pallavicino (composer) (1630–1688), Italian composer
- Cesare Pallavicino (1893–1976), Italian aeronautical engineer
- Giorgio Pallavicino Trivulzio (1796–1878), Italian aristocrat and politician
- Stefano Benedetto Pallavicino (1672–1742), Italian poet and librettist

Pallavicino is also the namesake of the following:

- Pallavicino PS-1, an Italian sportsplane
- Villa Pallavicino, several villas Italy

== See also ==
- Pallavicini
- Palavecino
