= Nicholas II of Saint-Omer =

Nicholas II of Saint Omer

Lord of one half of Thebes
- Reign: 1258–1294
- Predecessor: Bela of Saint Omer
- Successor: Otho of Saint Omer
- Spouse: Mary of Antioch; Anna Komnene Doukaina
- Father: Bela of Saint Omer
- Mother: Bonne de la Roche
- Religion: Roman Catholic

Nicholas II of Saint Omer was the lord of half of Thebes in Frankish Greece from 1258 to his death in 1294. From his two marriages he became one of the richest and most powerful barons of his time, building a splendid castle at Thebes as well as the Old Navarino castle. He also served as bailli of the Principality of Achaea on behalf of the Angevins of Naples between 1287 and 1289.

== Life ==
Nicholas was the son of Bela of Saint Omer and Bonne de la Roche, sister of the Lord of Athens and Thebes, Guy I de la Roche. Upon their marriage, in 1240, Guy gave Bela the lordship over half of Thebes.

Along with his brothers, Otho and John, he participated in the War of the Euboeote Succession in the ranks of the coalition of most of the princes of Frankish Greece, who opposed the expansionist policies of the Prince of Achaea, William II of Villehardouin. In 1273, Charles I of Naples sent him as his envoy to the Bulgarian and Serbian courts, but he soon fell into disfavour with Charles, and was forced to exchange his holdings in the Morea with others in Sicily, under Charles' immediate control. His position and domains were not restored until after the death of Charles I in 1285. During this time, Nicholas often resided in Italy, where Charles used him and other visiting Moreote barons as counsellors on the affairs of the Principality.\

Map of the Greek and Latin states in southern Greece ca. 1278. Nicholas' domain, Thebes, lay within the Duchy of Athens (in light green).

In 1287, the Neapolitan regent Robert of Artois named him the Angevins' representative governor (bailli) in the Principality of Achaea, in succession of William I of Athens, who had just died and whose heir, Guy II, was still under-age. At the time, Nicholas was the second richest and most influential baron living in the Latin East after Guy. He continued William's policy of fortification of Messenia and built the castle at Navarino and a smaller fortress at Maniatochori near Modon. His regime was remembered for its peace and prosperity: according to the Chronicle of Morea, "He governed with nobility and wisdom, and kept the country at peace". He was succeeded in 1289 by the Baron of Vostitsa, Guy de Charpigny.

Nicholas married twice, both times to rich heiresses. His first wife was Mary of Antioch, daughter of Bohemond VI of Antioch, and his second, ca. 1280, was Anna, daughter of Michael II Komnenos Doukas and widow of William II of Villehardouin. With financial aid from Mary of Antioch, Nicholas built the Castle of Saint Omer (in Greek Σανταμέρι, Santameri) in the Cadmea, the ancient acropolis of Thebes, which is much praised by the Chronicle of the Morea as being the strongest and most beautiful in Greece. It was richly furnished and decorated with frescoes depicting his ancestors' exploits in the Holy Land. Today, only a tower survives. Anna on the other hand, as Princess-dowager, brought with her a considerable property, including the castles of Kalamata and Chlemoutsi, comprising "some of the most fertile lands and the strongest fortress in the Morea", according to A. Bon. This worried King Charles, who was loath to cede these territories to an already very powerful and wealthy subject; in the event, they were exchanged in September 1281 with half the domains of the recently deceased Leonard of Veroli, comprising estates in both the Morea (in Elis and Messenia) and Italy.

Both his marriages were childless, and on his death in 1294, he was succeeded by his younger brother Otho.

== Sources ==
- Bon, Antoine (1969). La Morée franque. Recherches historiques, topographiques et archéologiques sur la principauté d'Achaïe [The Frankish Morea. Historical, Topographic and Archaeological Studies on the Principality of Achaea] (in French). Paris: De Boccard.
- Longnon, Jean (1975). "The Frankish States in Greece, 1204–1311". In Setton, Kenneth M.; Hazard, Harry W. (eds.). A History of the Crusades, Volume III: The Fourteenth and Fifteenth Centuries. Vol. 3. Madison and London: University of Wisconsin Press. pp. 234–275. ISBN 0-299-06670-3.
- Perra, Foteini (2011). Οικογένεια Σεντ Ομέρ. Encyclopedia of the Hellenic World, Boeotia (in Greek). Foundation of the Hellenic World.
- Trapp, Erich; Beyer, Hans-Veit; Kaplaneres, Sokrates; Leontiadis, Ioannis (1990). "24699. Σαῖντ ̓Ομέρ, Νικόλας ΙΙ. ντὲ". Prosopographisches Lexikon der Palaiologenzeit (in German). Vol. 10. Vienna: Verlag der Österreichischen Akademie der Wissenschaften. ISBN 3-7001-3003-1.

| Preceded by William I de la Roche | Angevin bailli in the Principality of Achaea; 1287–1289 | Succeeded by Guy de Charpigny |
| Preceded by Bela of Saint Omer | Lord of one half of Thebes; 1258–1294 | Succeeded by Otho of Saint Omer |
