= Ysabella (trobairitz) =

Trobairitz

Ysabel or Ysabella (poss. b. c. 1180) was a 13th-century trobairitz. Almost nothing is known about her with certainty, but many conjectures have been put forward. She has been identified with:

- Isabella, Queen of Jerusalem (died 1205), daughter of Amalric I of Jerusalem and Maria Comnena, widow of Conrad of Montferrat (died 1192)
- Isabella, Marchioness of Bodonitsa (1278–1286), daughter of Guy Pallavicini (died 1237)
- Isabella, Triarch of Negroponte (1217), widow of Ravano dalle Carceri
- An otherwise unnamed daughter of William V of Montferrat (died 1191), sister of Boniface of Thessalonica, and wife of Albert Malaspina

Ysabella is mentioned three times in the verses of Elias Cairel. "Estat ai dos ans" is addressed a ma dona Ysabelh (to my lady Ysabel). The tornada of "Mout mi platz lo doutz temps d'abril" contains the line Don'Izabel, ma chanso prezen: to Lady Isabel, my love song. "Pois chai la fuoilla del garric" also mentions ma dona Izabel. Elias travelled to Greece in the aftermath of the Fourth Crusade (1202–1204) and was in Thessalonica, at the court of Boniface, by 1207. By 1215 he was back in Italy, where he remained until 1225. It is possible that he met Isabella either in Greece or in Italy, if she was a relative of Boniface or the Pellavicini.

Ysabella composed one tenso, "N'Elyas Cairel, de l'amor", with Elias that survives. Early in the study of the trobairitz, it was commonly supposed that some of the more obscure women, like Ysabella, who are named as interlocutors with male counterparts, were not in fact real women, but rather fictions created by the troubadours for the sake of creating intersexual tensos. Ysabella was one such victim, though her existence is now presumed. Her tenso has been translated into English (Bogin), French (Pierre Bec), and German (Oskar Schultz and, more recently, Angelica Rieger).

The situation of the composition of the tenso between Elias and Ysabella has been a matter of dispute. One recent editor of Elias' corpus, Giosuè Lachin, believes the tenso was composed in Greece in 1204. The Old French song "L'autrier avint en chel autre païs", by the trouvère Conon de Béthune, whom Elias knew, has many thematic similarities with the tenso of Ysabella, though they are metrically dissimilar. Interesting for the purposes of determining the tenso's provenience is the mention in line 40 of lo patriarch'Iuan ("the patriarch John"), a possible reference to Patriarch John X of Constantinople (1199–1206).

The tenso opens with Ysabella recalling with fondness the days of her and Elias' former love. The factualness of their relationship is usually accepted and Elias is considered to have courted Ysabella, either in Greece, or Italy. Whatever the historical background, Ysabella and Elias are clearly no longer in a relationship when their dialogue begins, and Elias places the blame for their falling apart on her. This precipitates a spate of verbal assaults that eventually end in Elias' admission of uncourtliness and their reconciliation, with Ysabella offering to help him win over his new lady and he politely declining to share her name. This basic structure can be viewed as a deviation in the middle stanzas from the norms of courtly love (with Ysabella insulting instead of flattering her lover and he taking another love despite her continued affection) and a subsequent return to the norm in the closing stanzas. Recently, Catherine Ganiere, by analysing the use of negations by the interlocutors, has argued that Ysabella was more concerned with her inner feelings (of being loved), while Elias was more concerned with outward appearances, i.e. courtly behaviours, social standing, etc.

In 2011, Canadian composer Serouj Kradjian's work "Trobairitz Ysabella" was premiered by soprano Isabel Bayrakdarian and the Manitoba Chamber Orchestra under the direction of Anne Manson.

== Sources ==
- Bertoni, Giulio. I Trovatori d'Italia: Biografie, testi, tradizioni, note. Rome: Società Multigrafica Editrice Somu, 1967 [1915].
- Bogin, Meg. The Women Troubadours. Scarborough: Paddington, 1976. ISBN 0-8467-0113-8.
- Bruckner, Matilda Tomaryn; Shepard, Laurie; and White, Sarah. Songs of the Women Troubadours. New York: Garland Publishing, 1995. ISBN 0-8153-0817-5.
- Bruckner, Matilda Tomaryn. "Fictions of the Female Voice: The Women Troubadours" in: Anne Lingard Klinck and Ann Marie Rasmussen, edd., Medieval Woman's Song: Cross-Cultural Approaches. Pittsburg: University of Pennsylvania Press, 2002. ISBN 0-8122-3624-6.
- Ganiere, Catherine C. "Women Troubadours in Southern France: Personal Character, Unhappiness and Revolting Against Conventions," (M.A. thesis), Brigham Young University (December 2007).
- Lachin, Giosuè (ed.) "Isabella · Elias Cairel (252.1 = 133.7)." from Rialto (online 21 September 2004)
- Riquer, Martín de. Los trovadores: historia literaria y textos. 3 vol. Barcelona: Planeta, 1975.
