= Guy de la Roche =

Guy de la Roche may refer to:

- Guy I de la Roche (1205–1263), Duke of Athens from 1225/34
- Guy II de la Roche (1280–1308), Duke of Athens from 1287
