= Paravicini =

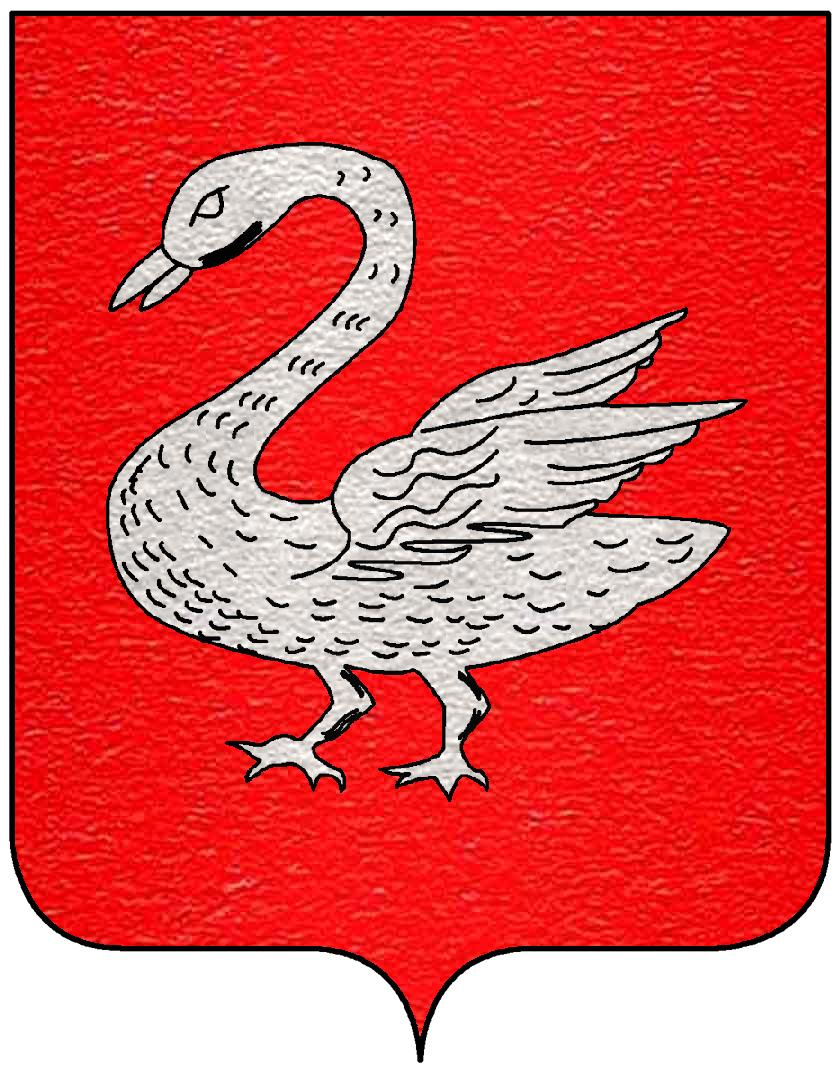
Coat of arms of the Paravicini family

Paravicini (pronounced [paraviˈtʃiːni]) is an Italian surname from Lombardy. It is also the name of an old Italian noble family, whose members occupied important ecclesiastical positions in the Catholic Church. Notable people with the name include:

- Agostino Paravicini Bagliani (born 1943), Italian historian
- Derek Paravicini (born 1979), English autistic savant known as a musical prodigy
- Elizabeth Hope, Baroness Glendevon (1915–1998), English noblewoman who later married Lt.-Col. Vincent Paravicini
- Giacomo Parravicini or Paravicini (1660–1729), Italian painter
- Harry de Paravicini (1859–1942), English first-class cricketer
- Hortensio Félix Paravicino (1580–1633), Spanish preacher
- Noah Paravicini (born 1997), American soccer player
- Ottavio Paravicini (1552–1611), Italian Roman Catholic cardinal
- Percy de Paravicini (1862–1921), English amateur cricketer and international footballer
- Tim de Paravicini (1945–2020), English electronic engineer, designer and founder of EAR Yoshino

== See also ==
- Pallavicini
- Parravicini
