= Guy of Charpigny =

Baron of Vostitsa in Frankish Greece (died 1295)

Guy of Charpigny (died 1295) was the second Baron of Vostitsa (modern Aigio) in the Principality of Achaea in Frankish Greece.

He was the son of the first baron, Hugh I of Charpigny, and succeeded him after his death in the mid-13th century.

In 1289 he also served for a few months as the bailli of the King of Naples for Achaea. He was much esteemed by the people of the Morea, but was killed at Xylokastro in 1295 by a Greek magnate from Kalavryta named Photius, who mistook him for Walter of Liederkerque, the castellan of Acrocorinth, against whom Photius had grievances. According to the Chronicle of the Morea, when the shouts of Guy's servants revealed to Photius his mistake, the Greek took the dying man in his arms and asked for forgiveness, but Guy died in his arms. He was succeeded by his son, Hugh II.

== Sources ==
- Bon, Antoine (1969). La Morée franque. Recherches historiques, topographiques et archéologiques sur la principauté d'Achaïe [The Frankish Morea. Historical, Topographic and Archaeological Studies on the Principality of Achaea] (in French). Paris: De Boccard.
- Longnon, Jean (1969) [1962]. "The Frankish States in Greece, 1204–1311". In Setton, Kenneth M.; Wolff, Robert Lee; Hazard, Harry W. (eds.). A History of the Crusades, Volume II: The Later Crusades, 1189–1311. Vol. 2 (Second ed.). Madison, Milwaukee, and London: University of Wisconsin Press. pp. 234–275. ISBN 0-299-04844-6.
- Miller, William (1908). The Latins in the Levant: A History of Frankish Greece (1204–1566). London: John Murray.

Preceded by Nicholas II of Saint Omer	Angevin bailli in the Principality of Achaea; 1289	Vacant Direct administration by Prince Florent of Hainaut Title next held by Richard Orsini
Preceded by Hugh I of Charpigny	Baron of Vostitsa; 1278–1295	Succeeded by Hugh II of Charpigny
