= Parravicini =

Parravicini (pronounced [paraviˈtʃiːni]) is an Italian surname from Lombardy. Notable people with the surname include:

- Benjamín Solari Parravicini (1898–1974), Argentine artist
- Elizabeth Parravincina or Parravicini (1950–1977), English murder victim
- Florencio Parravicini (1876–1941), Argentine actor
- Francesco Parravicini (born 1982), Italian footballer
- Giacomo Parravicini or Paravicini (1660–1729), Italian painter
- Mariangela Parravicini (born 1986), Italian freestyle skier
- Tim Parravicini (born 1981), Australian long jumper

Pallavicini is also the namesake of the 6.5×52mm Parravicini-Carcano, an Italian military rifle cartridge.

== See also ==
- Pallavicini
- Paravicini
