= Guglielma Pallavicini =

- Marchesato di Bodonitsa

Marchesato di Bodonitsa
- Reign: 15 March 1311 – 1358
- Predecessor: Alberto Pallavicini, Marchese di Bodonitsa
- Successor: Niccolò I Zorzi
- Born: 1300 circa
- Died: 1358; Bodonitsa
- Spouse: Bartolomeo Zaccaria
- Dynasty: Pallavicino
- Father: Alberto Pallavicini, Marchese di Bodonitsa
- Mother: Maria Dalle Carceri

Guglielma Pallavicini (rarely Wilhelmina; died 1358), the Lady of Thermopylae, was the last Pallavicino heir to rule in Bodonitsa, in Frankish Greece.

After the death of her father Albert in 1311, she became Margrave and held this position until her death in 1358. She shared the margraviate firstly with her mother Maria dalle Carceri and later with her stepfather Andrea Cornaro and her own husband Bartolomeo Zaccaria.

== Life ==
The succession of all Latin fiefs in Greece was regulated at the time of Albert's death by the Book of the Customs of the Empire of Romania. By custom, the inheritance was split between the widow and daughter. Maria remarried quickly in order to protect the margraviate from Catalan incursions.

In 1327, Guglielma Pallavicini married Bartolomeo Zaccaria, a Genoese man who had been captured during Cornaro's (and the margraviate's) repulsion of an invasion by Alfonso Fadrique of Athens. Bartolomeo died in 1334.

She then married Niccolò Zorzi, a Venetian, who arrived in Bodonitsa in 1335. This marriage became strategically important after her stepfather’s death, as it allowed her to remain in residence on Negroponte and to reconcile her claims to the castle of Larena with Venice's claim.

Pallavicini and Zorzi continued to make the annual tribute of four destriers to the Athenian Catalans, but this did not bring peace to Bodonitsa. Venice continued the dispute over Larena and sought the arbitration of the bailiff of Catherine II, Princess of Achaea, the legal suzerain of Euboea and Bodonitsa. The bailiff decided for Venice. This strained the marchioness's marriage, with Pallavicini accusing her husband of "cowardice and bias [towards Venice]." She also believed that he ignored the interests of her daughter by Bartolomeo in favor of his own offspring; she had saved a large amount of money for her daughter Marula, but had deposited it in a Venetian bank.

Zorzi later ordered the execution of one of her relatives, Manfredo. Although the execution had been legal, Guglielma successfully turned the people of the margraviate against her husband, who was forced to flee to Negroponte.

The ensuing battle between husband and wife was anything but pretty. He went to Venice and appealed to the Senate, which demanded the return of him to his position or the relinquishing of his property, which she held. She refused, and the bailiff of Negroponte was ordered to sever all communication between Bodonitsa and the island. The Catalans, who had initially been asked to take no action, were now pressed by Venice to intervene for a peaceful settlement, along with Joan I of Naples, head of the Angevins, and Humbert II, Dauphin of Vienne (then a papal naval commander). When this failed, Marula's money, still in a bank in Venice, was confiscated, and Zorzi was compensated from the funds. Guglielma still refused to readmit her husband to her court, preferring the advice of her own bishop Natarus of Thermopylae to that of the words of Pope Clement VI.

In 1354, Zorzi died and Pallavicini immediately installed their eldest son, Francis, as her co-ruler. The two were now on good terms again with Venice and they were included in the treaty subsequently signed with the Catalans.

== Legacy ==
Guglielma Pallavicini died in 1358. She was succeeded by her son Francis Zorzi who began the Zorzi line of Bodonitsa rulers. Her two younger sons James and Niccolò III later ruled Bodonitsa.

Her grandson Jacob Zorzi was the last true ruler of the area; his son Nicholas II Zorzi held it for a few months before it was captured by the Ottoman Empire.

Francesco I Acciaioli, Duke of Athens was her great-grandson.

== Sources ==
- Miller, William (1908). "The Marquisate of Boudonitza (1204-1414)". Journal of Hellenic Studies. 28 (2): 234–249. doi:10.2307/624608. JSTOR 624608. S2CID 162336648.
- Setton, Kenneth M. Catalan Domination of Athens 1311–1380. Revised edition. Variorum: London, 1975.
