= Battle of Neopatras =

1270s battle in Greece

- Part of the Byzantine-Latin Wars
- Map of the Byzantine Empire and the Latin states in southern Greece c. 1278
Date	1274/75 (or 1272/73)
Location	Neopatras (modern Ypati in Phthiotis, Greece)
Result	Byzantine defeat

Belligerents
Byzantine Empire	Principality of Thessaly; Duchy of Athens

Commanders and leaders
John Palaiologos; Alexios Kaballarios †	John I Doukas; John I de la Roche

Strength
Reportedly ~30,000	300–500

The Battle of Neopatras was fought in the early 1270s between a Byzantine army besieging the city of Neopatras and the forces of John I Doukas, ruler of Thessaly. The battle was a rout for the Byzantine army, which was caught by surprise and defeated by a much smaller but more disciplined force.

== Background ==
In 1259, the Empire of Nicaea, led by Michael VIII Palaiologos (r. 1259–1282), had achieved a great victory in the Battle of Pelagonia against a coalition of its major European foes, the Despotate of Epirus, the Kingdom of Sicily, and the Principality of Achaia. This victory had in large measure been achieved through the defection of John Doukas, the illegitimate child of Michael II of Epirus. This victory enabled Palaiologos to consolidate his territories in Europe; further, the weakening of Epirus and the Latin states allowed him to carry out the reconquest of Constantinople in 1261 and to re-establish the Byzantine Empire, with himself as emperor. The Nicaean forces failed however to subdue Epirus: John Doukas quickly returned to his father's allegiance, and the local population remained loyal to Michael II. The Nicaeans were expelled from the area in 1259, and then defeated and driven out from Thessaly as well in 1260.

In 1266 or 1268, Michael II of Epirus died, and his possessions were divided among his sons: his eldest legitimate son, Nikephoros, inherited what remained of Epirus proper, while John, who had married the daughter of a local Vlach ruler of Thessaly, received Thessaly with his capital at Neopatras. Both brothers were hostile to the restored Byzantine Empire, which aimed to reclaim their territories, and maintained close relations with the Latin states in southern Greece. Nevertheless, Michael VIII tried to attach them to him through dynastic marriages: Nikephoros was given his niece Anna Kantakouzene, while one of his nephews, Andronikos Tarchaneiotes, was wed to the daughter of John Doukas, who in addition received the light title of sebastokrator. Michael failed in his aim, however, as both, and particularly John, remained ill-disposed towards him. Following the deeply unpopular Union of the Churches in 1274, the two even provided refuge for the many dissenters and critics of Michael's religious policies.

Nevertheless, through the negotiations, the Act of Union and the submission of the Greek Orthodox Church to the See of Rome, Michael averted the danger of a concerted Latin attack on his state, and was free to move against his enemies. Immediately, he launched offensives against the Sicilian holdings in Albania, and against John Doukas in Thessaly.

== Battle ==
For the campaign against Thessaly (the date is uncertain, most recent scholars favour 1272/3 or 1274/5), Michael assembled a huge force, mostly mercenaries, which contemporary sources put, certainly with considerable exaggeration, at 30,000 (Pachymeres speaks of 40,000 men, including the naval forces). These were placed under his own brother, the despotes John Palaiologos, and the general Alexios Kaballarios. This force was sent against Thessaly, and was to be aided by the Byzantine navy under the protostrator Alexios Doukas Philanthropenos, who was to attack the Latin principalities and prevent them from aiding John Doukas.

Doukas was caught completely by surprise by the rapid advance of the imperial forces, and was bottled up with few men in his capital, Neopatras, which the Byzantines proceeded to lay siege to. Doukas, however, resorted to a ruse: he climbed down the walls of the fortress with a rope and, disguised as a groom, he managed to cross the Byzantine leaguer. After three days, he reached Thebes, where he requested the aid of John I de la Roche (r. 1263–1280), the Duke of Athens.

The two rulers concluded a treaty of alliance, by which John de la Roche's brother and heir, William, would marry John Doukas's daughter Helena and receive the fortresses of Gravia, Siderokastron, Gardiki, and Zetouni as her dowry. In return, de la Roche gave Doukas 300 or 500 horsemen (depending on the source) with whom he returned quickly to Neopatras. The Byzantine force there had been considerably weakened, with several detachments sent off to capture other forts or plunder the region, and was furthermore unwieldy and not very cohesive, given the many races that served in it. According to the Venetian historian Marino Sanudo, when John Doukas and John de la Roche climbed a height and saw the huge Byzantine encampment, de la Roche uttered, in Greek, a phrase from Herodotus: "there are a lot of people here, but few men." Indeed, the Byzantine troops panicked under the sudden attack of the smaller but disciplined Latin force, and broke completely when a Cuman contingent abruptly switched sides. Despite John Palaiologos's attempts to rally his forces, they fled and scattered.

== Aftermath ==
At the news of this success, the Latins became emboldened and assembled a fleet to attack the Byzantine fleet, which was anchored at Demetrias (near modern Volos). Initially, the Latins made good progress, inflicting many casualties on the Byzantine crews. But just as victory seemed imminent, John Palaiologos arrived with reinforcements and turned the tide of the battle. Despite this victory, however, the despotes was shattered by the disaster of Neopatras: he resigned his post and died later the same year.

== Notes ==
a: The date of the Battle of Neopatras, and hence also of the subsequent Battle of Demetrias, is disputed amongst scholars. Earlier historians followed the 17th-century Jesuit scholar Pierre Poussines, who placed the events in 1271. A. Failler re-dated the events to 1272/3, a date also adopted by other scholars, like Alice-Mary Talbot in the Oxford Dictionary of Byzantium. Deno J. Geanakoplos placed the Thessalian campaign after the Council of Lyon, hence in late 1274 or early 1275, and his dating has been adopted by a number of recent scholars like Donald Nicol and John Van Antwerp Fine.

== Sources ==
- Bartusis, Mark C. (1997). The Late Byzantine Army: Arms and Society, 1204–1453. Philadelphia, Pennsylvania: University of Pennsylvania Press. ISBN 0-8122-1620-2.
- Failler, A. (1981). "Chronologie et composition dans l'Histoire de Georges Pachymérès". Revue des études byzantines. 39: 145–249. doi:10.3406/rebyz.1981.2121.
- Fine, John V. A. (1994) [1987]. The Late Medieval Balkans: A Critical Survey from the Late Twelfth Century to the Ottoman Conquest. Ann Arbor, Michigan: University of Michigan Press. ISBN 978-0-472-10079-8.
- Geanakoplos, Deno John (1959). Emperor Michael Palaeologus and the West, 1258–1282: A Study in Byzantine-Latin Relations. Cambridge, Massachusetts: Harvard University Press.
- Kazhdan, Alexander, ed. (1991). The Oxford Dictionary of Byzantium. Oxford and New York: Oxford University Press. ISBN 0-19-504652-8.
- Longnon, Jean (1969) [1962]. "The Frankish States in Greece, 1204–1311". In Setton, Kenneth M.; Wolff, Robert Lee; Hazard, Harry W. (eds.). A History of the Crusades, Volume II: The Later Crusades, 1189–1311. Vol. 2 (Second ed.). Madison, Milwaukee, and London: University of Wisconsin Press. pp. 234–275. ISBN 0-299-04844-6.
- Nicol, Donald M. (1993) [1972]. The Last Centuries of Byzantium, 1261–1453 (Second ed.). Cambridge: Cambridge University Press. ISBN 978-0-521-43991-6.
- Setton, Kenneth M. (1976). The Papacy and the Levant (1204–1571), Volume I: The Thirteenth and Fourteenth Centuries. Vol. 1. Philadelphia: The American Philosophical Society. ISBN 0-87169-114-0.
