= Andrea Cornaro, Marquis of Bodonitsa =

Andrea Cornaro (died 1323) of the House of Cornaro, was a Venetian citizen from Crete, and baron of Scarpanto. He was the husband of Maria dalle Carceri, heiress of a sixth of Euboea and widow of Albert Pallavicini, and co-governed her half of the marquisate of Bodonitsa until his death.

After Albert Pallavicini's death in 1311, Bodonitsa was divided between his wife Maria and his daughter Guglielma. The latter married Bartolomeo Zaccaria. Cornaro was sought out by Maria in order to defend her and her daughter's rights to Bodonitsa in light of the recent Battle of Halmyros, which had completely upended the political structure of Frankish Greece. He married Maria in 1312.

Cornaro tended to reside in Euboea. He had to weather an invasion by the Catalan Company and the Duchy of Athens under Alfonso Fadrique. During that war, Bartolomeo was captured and carted off to a Sicilian prison. In 1319, Cornaro, with Venice, made a treaty with the Catalans. He was constrained to pay an annual tribute of four destriers to the vicar general of Athens. Four years later, he died.

| Preceded by Maria dalle Carceri and Guglielma Pallavicini | Marquess of Bodonitsa; 1312–1323 with Maria dalle Carceri and Guglielma Pallavicini | Succeeded by Guglielma Pallavicini |
