= Hugh I =

Hugh I may refer to:

- Hugh I of Lusignan (c. 885–c. 930)
- Hugh I, Count of Maine (died 933)
- Hugh I, Viscount of Châteaudun (died 989 or after)
- Hugh I of France (c. 939–996), a.k.a. Hugh Capet, first King of the Franks of the Capetian dynasty
- Hugh I of Autun (c. 975–1039), a.k.a. Hugh of Chalon, ruler & religious leader
- Hugh I, Count of Empúries (c. 965–1040)
- Hugh I of Le Puiset (died 1096)
- Hugh I, Count of Ponthieu (died c. 1100)
- Hugh I, Count of Clermont-en-Beauvaisis (1030–1101)
- Hugh I of Oisy (died c. 1111)
- Hugh I of Jaffa (died between 1112 and 1118)
- Hugh I, Count of Rethel (1040–1118)
- Hugh I, Duke of Burgundy (1057–1093)
- Hugh I, Count of Dammartin (died after 1093)
- Hugh I of Vermandois (1057–1101), a.k.a. Hugh the Great
- Hugh I of Champagne (c. 1074–c. 1125), a.k.a. Hugh, Count of Champagne
- Hugh I, Count of Catanzaro (died 1190/5), a.k.a. Hugh Lupin the Elder
- Hugh I of Arborea (1178–1211)
- Hugh I of Angoulême (c. 1183–c. 1249), a.k.a. Hugh X of Lusignan
- Hugh I of Cyprus (1194/5–1218)
- Hugh I of Ghent (died 1232)
- Hugh I, Count of Blois (c. 1198–1248), a.k.a. Hugh I of Châtillon
- Hugh I of Charpigny (fl. early 13th century)
- Hugh I of Jerusalem (c. 1235–1284), a.k.a. Hugh III of Cyprus
- Hugh I of Chalon-Arlay (1288–1322)
- Hugh I de Audley (c. 1291–1347)
