= Pallavicini family =

Italian noble family

Pallavicini
- Arms of the Pallavicini of Genoa
- Parent family: Obertenghi
- Current region: Italy
- Founded: 11th century
- Founder: Oberto II Pelavicino
- Branches: Pallavicini of Busseto; Pallavicini of Crema; Pallavicini of Trivulzio; Pallavicini of Cortemaggiore; Pallavicini of Genoa; Pallavicini of Bologna; Pallavicini of England; Pallavicini of Naples; Pallavicini of Pellegrino; Pallavicini of Polesine

The House of Pallavicini, also known as Pallavicino and formerly known as Pelavicino, is an ancient Italian noble family founded by Oberto II Pelavicino of the Frankish House of Obertenghi.

== The Pallavicini of Genoa ==
The first recorded member of the Pallavicini family was Oberto I (died 1148). The first Pallavicino fief was created by Oberto II, who received it from Holy Roman Emperor Frederick Barbarossa in 1162. A number of lines are descended from Guglielmo (died 1217), possessor of a series of fiefs between Parma and Piacenza.

== The Pallavicini of the Latin Empire ==
Through the descendants of Guy and his brother Rubino, sons of Guglielmo, a branch of the family rose to prominence in the Latin Empire founded after the Fourth Crusade in 1204.

They governed the Margraviate of Bodonitsa from 1204 to 1358. They grew in riches and, after 1224, became also the most powerful family in the former Kingdom of Thessalonica (northern Greece). The first margraves were of Guy's line until his daughter Isabella died, at which time the line of Rubino inherited the throne. The Pallavicini were related to the De la Roche family then ruling in Athens. After the death of Albert in 1311 the Pallavicini influence slowly declined. The subsequent Zorzi margraves were matrilineal descendants of the last Pallavicini marquise, Guglielma.

== Notable members ==
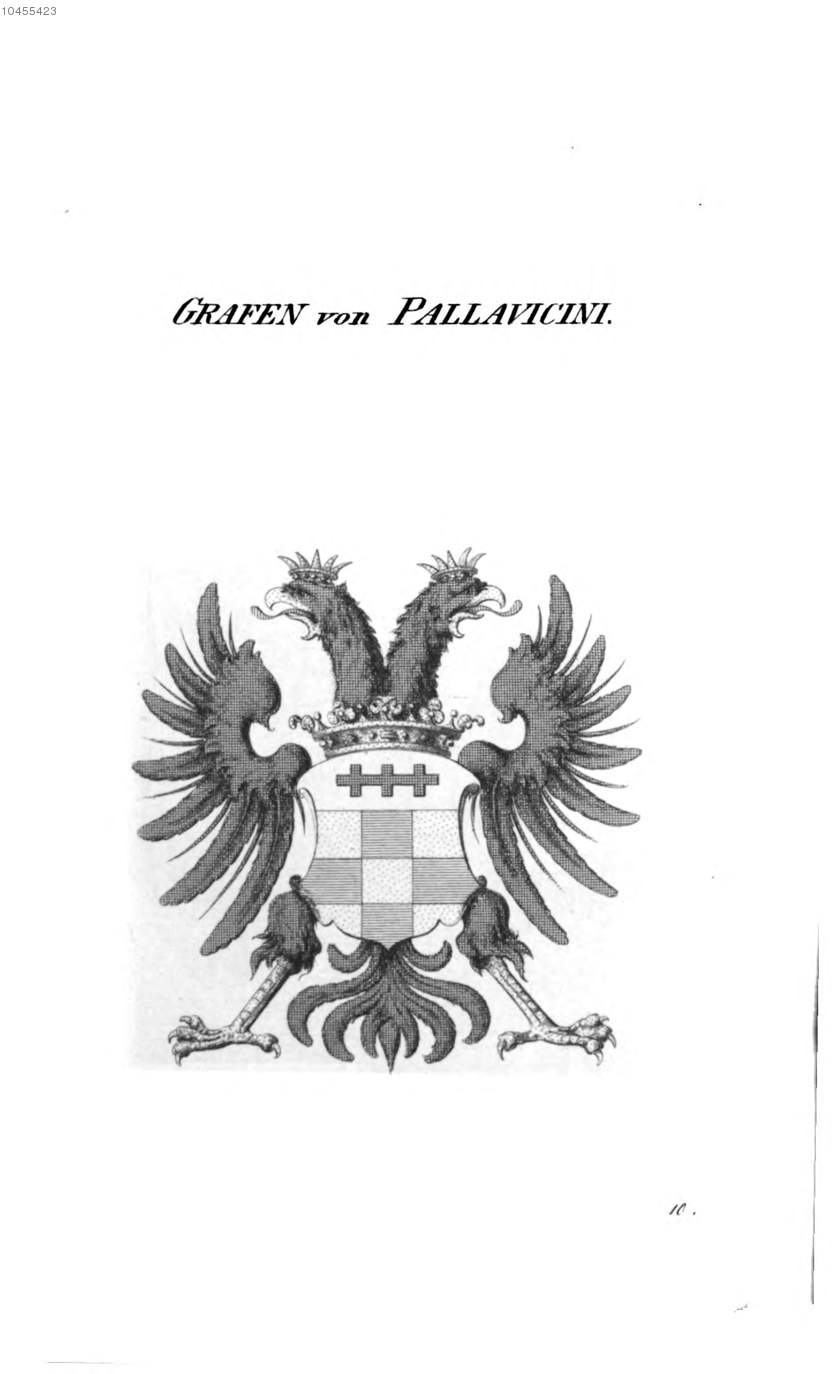
Arms of the Grafen von Pallavicini

- Arms of the Marquises of Pallavicini and Csáky-Pallavicini
- Oberto "il Pelavicino" (1080 - 1148), Military field captain, Founder of Pallavicini family
- Guglielmo I. Pallavicino (c. 1106 - c. 1162), Founder of Lombardy branch
- Alberto Pallavicino "il Greco" (c.1106 - c. 1148), Crusader during first crusade, father of Nicolò Pallavicino
- Oberto I. Pallavicino (c. 1132 - c. 1196),
- Guglielmo II. Pallavicino (c.1170 - 1217), Founder of Scipione, Pellegrino, Raverano, Stupinigi and Bargone branch
- Nicolò Pallavicino (c. 1130 - 1200), Founder of Genoa branch
- Oberto Pallavicino (1197 - 1269), Military field captain under Frederick II, Holy Roman Emperor
- Guido (Guy) Pallavicino "Marchesopoulo" (c.1180 - 1237) First marquess of Bodonitsa
- Oberto II Pallavicino (1197 - 1269), Military field captain
- Ubertino Pallavicini (died 1278)
- Isabella Pallavicini (died 1286)
- Albert Pallavicini (died 1311)
- Thomas Pallavicini (born before 1286, died after 1331), margrave of Bodonitsa, grandson of Rubino
- Guglielma Pallavicini (died 1358)
- Rolando Pallavicino " il Magnifico" (c.1393 - 1457) Military leader and founder of Stato Pallavicino
- Antonio Pallavicini Gentile (1441 - 1507), Roman Catholic Cardinal, Papabile in 1492
- Gerolamo Pallavicini (c. 1463 - 1503), Roman Catholic Bishop of Novara
- Battista Pallavicino (died 1466), Roman Catholic Bishop of Reggio Emilia (1444 - 1466)
- Carlo Pallavicino (died 1497), Italian Roman Catholic bishop of Lodi (1456 - 1497)
- Giovanni Battista Pallavicino (1480–1524), Italian Roman Catholic bishop and cardinal
- Cipriano Pallavicino (1509–1585), Roman Catholic Archbishop of Genoa (1568 - 1585) and Apostolic Nuncio to Naples (1566)
- Sforza Pallavicini (1519 - 1585), Mercenary Commander in Hungary and Transylvania, General of the Republic of Venice
- Tobia Pallavicino (c. 1521 - 1581), Merchant, senator and governor of Genoa
- Sir Horatio Pallavicino (c. 1540 - 1600), Merchant, financier, and diplomat in England
- Benedetto Pallavicino (c. 1551 - 1601), from Cremona, composer
- Agostino Pallavicini (1577 - 1649), 103th Doge of the Republic of Genoa, King of Corsica
- Francesco Sforza Pallavicino (1607 - 1667), Italian historian and cardinal
- Ferrante Pallavicino (1618 - 1644), Italian writer of antisocial and obscene stories and novels with biblical and profane themes
- Carlo Pallavicino (c. 1630 - 1688), Italian composer
- Rannunzio Pallavicino (1632 - 1712), Roman Catholic cardinal
- Stefano Benedetto Pallavicino (1672 - 1742), Italian poet and opera librettist
- Gian Luca Pallavicini-Centurioni (1697 - 1773), Austro-Genoese military field marshal, Governor of Milan
- Caterina Imperiale Lercari Pallavicini (fl. 1721), Neo-Latin poet
- Lazzaro Opizio Pallavicino (1776 - 1777), Camerlengo of the Sacred College of Cardinals
- Gian Carlo Pallavicino (1722 - 1794), 179th Doge of the Republic of Genoa
- Alerame Maria Pallavicini (1730–1805), 181th Doge of the Republic of Genoa
- Gian Carlo Pallavicini (1741 - 1789), Austro-Genoese military field marshal, founder of Hungarian family branch
- Giorgio Pallavicino Trivulzio (1796 - 1878), Politician during Italian unification
- Emilio Pallavicini (1823 - 1901), general and senator who defeated Garibaldi at the battle of Aspromonte
- Marchesa Anna d'Androgna Parravicini (1840 - 1922), Noblewoman and patron of the arts
- Johann, Markgraf von Pallavicini (1848 - 1941), Austro-Hungarian diplomat
- Alfred von Pallavicini (1848–1886), Austro-Hungarian pioneer mountaineer and gymnast
- Alexander Pallavicini (1853–1933), Austro-Hungarian Patron
- Friedrich Ludwig von Berzeviczy-Pallavicini (1909 - 1989), Hungarian Designer
- Antal Pálinkás-Pallavicini (1922 - 1957), Hungarian military major and martyr
- Abd al Wahid Pallavicini (1926 - 2017), Sufi theologian and founder of the Italian Islamic Religious Community (COREIS) and the Interreligious Studies Academy (Accademia ISA)
- Markgraf (Őrgróf) Tamás Csáky-Pallavicini (1960 - ), Secretary General of the World Federation of Catholic Medical Associations in the Vatican
- Markgraf Alfonso Pallavicini, married in July 2006 Countess Elisabeth d'Udekem d'Acoz, sister of Queen Mathilde of Belgium

== Family tree ==
Obertenghi Family

Adalberto the Margrave il Margravio or Adalberto III (10th century – 951?)	unknown
Oberto I (?-975)	unknown	Ambroso; Bishop of Aleria (?-988)
Oberto II	Railenda	Adalberto I	Adelaide	Adalberto III	unknown	Anselmo	Guglielmo	Berta	Oberto Obizzo
Ugo	Alberto; Azzo I	Adele	Oberto; Obizzo I	Bertha	Ulric Manfred II	Adalberto IV	Anselmo	Oberto III	Adalberto VI

== See also ==
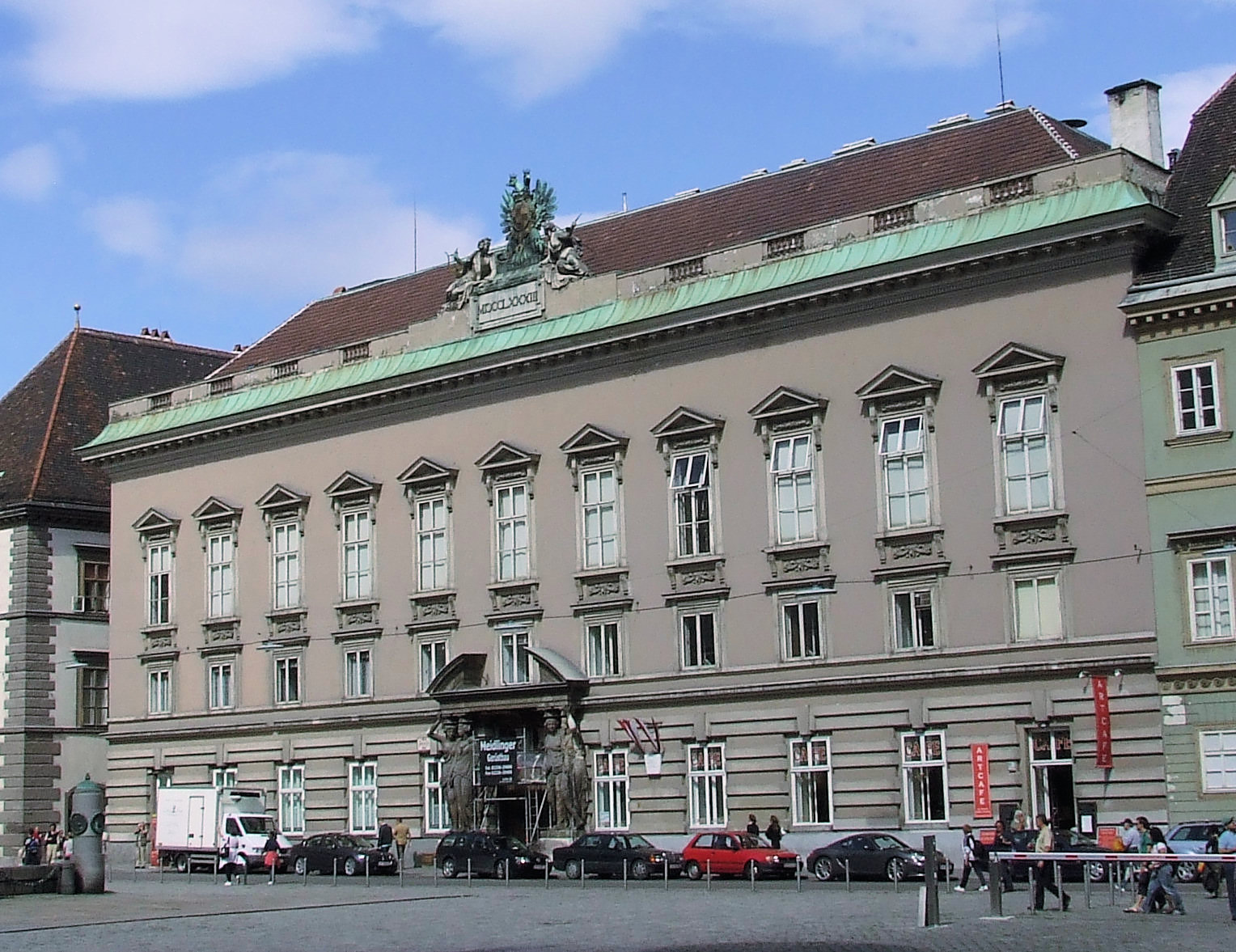
Palais Pallavicini in Vienna

A number of buildings are named after the family:

- Palais Pallavicini in Vienna, Austria
- Palazzo Pallavicini-Rospigliosi in Rome, Italy
- Villa Durazzo-Pallavicini near Genoa, Italy
- Palazzo Pallavicini in Bologna, Italy
- Villa Gandolfi-Pallavicini in Bologna, Italy
- Palazzo Pallavicino in Parma, Italy

== Sources ==
- Miller, W. "The Marquisate of Boudonitza (1204–1414)." Journal of Hellenic Studies, Vol. 28, 1908, pp 234–249.
- Setton, Kenneth M. (general editor) A History of the Crusades: Volume III — The Fourteenth and Fifteenth Centuries. Harry W. Hazard, editor. University of Wisconsin Press: Madison, 1975.
- Marquisate of Bodonitsa
