= William I de la Roche =

Duke of Athens

Coat of arms of William

William I de la Roche (died 1287) succeeded his brother, John I, as Duke of Athens in 1280. He was the son of Guy I de la Roche.

William reversed the territorial losses of his brother's reign, extending his control over Lamia and Gardiki. He married Helena Angelina Komnene, daughter of John I Doukas, ruler of Thessaly, securing a military alliance with him.

In 1285, while Charles II of Naples, the nominal prince of Achaea, was imprisoned, Robert II of Artois, the regent of the kingdom, named William bailiff and vicar-general of Achaea. William built the castle of Dimatra to defend Messenia from the Byzantine Empire. He was then the most powerful baron in Frankish Greece. In 1286, he arbitrated the succession of the March of Bodonitsa following the death of Isabella Pallavicini. He chose her cousin Thomas over her widower Antoine le Flamenc.

William's rule was peaceful but short, as he died two years after assuming power in Achaea (1287). He was succeeded by his son Guy, who was seven years old.

== Notes ==
Preceded by John I	Duke of Athens; 1280–1287	Succeeded by Guy II
Preceded by Guy of Dramelay	Angevin bailli in the Principality of Achaea; 1285–1287	Succeeded by Nicholas II of Saint Omer
