= John of Saint-Omer =

John of Saint Omer
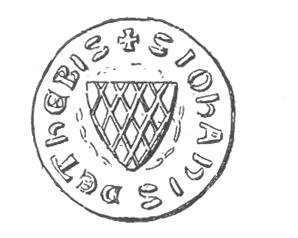
- Seal of John of Saint Omer

Lord of a third of the Barony of Akova, Marshal of the Principality of Achaea
- Reign: 1276–unknown
- Successor: Nicholas III of Saint Omer
- Spouse: Margaret of Passavant
- Issue: Nicholas III of Saint Omer
- Father: Bela of Saint Omer
- Mother: Bonne de la Roche
- Religion: Roman Catholic

John of Saint Omer (Jean de Saint-Omer) was baron of a third of Akova and marshal of the Principality of Achaea.

== Life ==
He was a younger son of Bela of Saint Omer and Bonne de la Roche, sister of the Lord of Athens and Thebes, Guy I de la Roche. Upon their marriage, in 1240, Guy gave Bela the lordship over half of Thebes. John participated, along with his brothers Nicholas II and Otho, in the War of the Euboeote Succession in the ranks of the coalition of most of the princes of Frankish Greece, who opposed the expansionist policies of the Prince of Achaea, William II of Villehardouin.

John married Margaret of Passavant in 1276, but was unsuccessful in securing her inheritance of the Barony of Akova in the Principality of Achaea, which had been appropriated by the Prince after the death of baron Walter of Rosières. Despite the support of his brother Nicholas, he managed to receive only a third of the barony (eight fiefs), as well as the post of hereditary marshal of the Principality.

From his marriage he had one son, Nicholas III of Saint Omer.

== Sources ==
- Bon, Antoine (1969). La Morée franque. Recherches historiques, topographiques et archéologiques sur la principauté d'Achaïe [The Frankish Morea. Historical, Topographic and Archaeological Studies on the Principality of Achaea] (in French). Paris: De Boccard.
- Longnon, Jean (1969) [1962]. "The Frankish States in Greece, 1204–1311". In Setton, Kenneth M.; Wolff, Robert Lee; Hazard, Harry W. (eds.). A History of the Crusades, Volume II: The Later Crusades, 1189–1311. Vol. 2 (Second ed.). Madison, Milwaukee, and London: University of Wisconsin Press. pp. 234–275. ISBN 0-299-04844-6.
- Trapp, Erich; Beyer, Hans-Veit; Kaplaneres, Sokrates; Leontiadis, Ioannis (1990). "24701. Σαῖντ ̓Ομέρ, Ντζὰν ντὲ". Prosopographisches Lexikon der Palaiologenzeit (in German). Vol. 10. Vienna: Verlag der Österreichischen Akademie der Wissenschaften. ISBN 3-7001-3003-1.
