= Palavecino =

Palavecino is a surname. Notable people with the name include:

- Agustín Palavecino (born 1996), Argentine footballer
- Carlos Palavecino (born 1975), Argentine rower
- Matías Palavecino (born 1998), Argentine footballer
- Oscar Palavecino, Argentine folk singer
- Santiago Palavecino (born 1974), Argentine male boxer
- Sixto Palavecino (1915–2009), Argentine poet, musician and folk singer

== See also ==
- Palavecino Municipality in the Venezuelan state of Lara
- Pallavicino (surname)
