= Hugh I of Charpigny =

Hugh I of Charpigny was a French Crusader and the first (or possibly second) Baron of Vostitsa in the Principality of Achaea.

The Barony of Vostitsa was established ca. 1209, after the conquest of the Peloponnese by the Crusaders, and was one of the original twelve secular baronies within the Principality of Achaea. The barony, with eight knight's fiefs attached to it, was given to the Charpigny family, of which Hugh is commonly held to have been the first baron. The family is obscure, however, and the exact origin of Hugh is disputed due to the differing attestations of his name in the main source, the various versions of the Chronicle of the Morea. The Greek version gives his surname as "de Lele", which has been commonly interpreted as being a corruption of "de Lille", and claims that he adopted the surname "de Charpigny" afterwards; while the Aragonese version of the Chronicle mentions that the first baron of Vostitsa was Guy, that Hugh was his son, named "Cherpini" after the Greek village where he was born (which some authors identify with Kerpini), and "Lello" was the name of a fortress constructed on the family's domains in Laconia (possibly Helos); to further complicate matters, the toponym "Charpigny" is not attested in contemporary France. Whatever its origin, the family used the surname "Charpigny" in Greece; and Hugh was succeeded by his son Guy (II?).

== Sources ==
- Bon, Antoine (1969). La Morée franque. Recherches historiques, topographiques et archéologiques sur la principauté d'Achaïe [The Frankish Morea. Historical, Topographic and Archaeological Studies on the Principality of Achaea] (in French). Paris: De Boccard. OCLC 869621129.
- Miller, William (1921). Essays on the Latin Orient. Cambridge: Cambridge University Press. OCLC 457893641.

New title	Baron of Vostitsa ca. 1209–unknown	Succeeded by Guy of Charpigny
