= Isabella Pallavicini =

Isabella Pallavicini (died 1286), sometimes Jezebel, was sovereign marchioness of Bodonitsa from 1278 to 1286.

She succeeded her brother Ubertino and also inherited her elder sister Mabilia's Italian possessions in Parma. The three were the only children of the first margrave Guy. In 1278, the year of her succession, Isabella was requested by her new lord, Charles of Anjou, to do homage to his new bailli at Glarentsa. When the barons of the Principality of Achaea, of which the ruler of Bodonitsa was chiefest of twelve peers, refused to do homage to the bailli Galeran d'Ivry as vicar general, the primary reason was the absenteeism of their primus inter pares, Isabella.

Isabella was old at her accession and did not live long thereafter. She died childless and left open a succession dispute, which was eventually solved by the arbitration of William I of Athens, then acting bailiff of Achaea, in favour of her cousin Albert. According to an unfounded conjecture by Karl Hopf, she was married to Anthony le Flamenc.

She is possibly the trobairitz known only as Ysabella.

== Sources ==
- Miller, William (1908). "The Marquisate of Boudonitza (1204–1414)". Journal of Hellenic Studies. 28 (2): 234–249. doi:10.2307/624608. JSTOR 624608. S2CID 162336648.
- Setton, Kenneth M. (general editor) A History of the Crusades: Volume III — The Fourteenth and Fifteenth Centuries. Harry W. Hazard, editor. University of Wisconsin Press: Madison, 1975.

Preceded by Ubertino Pallavicini	Marchioness of Bodonitsa; 1278–1286	Succeeded by Thomas Pallavicini
