= Ubertino Pallavicini =

Ubertino (or Umbertino) Pallavicini (died 1278) was the son and successor of Guy as Marquess of Bodonitsa in 1237.

Despite the fact that, since the fall of the Kingdom of Thessalonica in 1224, Bodonitsa was a vassal of the Principality of Achaea, Ubertino assisted his cousin Guy de la Roche, Duke of Athens, in war against the prince of Achaea, William of Villehardouin. He was present at the Battle of Karydi in 1258 and retreated with the duke back to Thebes. In 1259, however, he joined the prince and the Despot of Epirus, Michael II, against the Emperor of Nicaea, John IV Lascaris. They were defeated on the plain of Pelagonia. In 1263, Ubertino was again at the side of his liege lord making war on the Despotate of Morea.

During Ubertino's reign, much of the Euboea was lost to the Greeks, and pirates operating from the island of Atalanta prevented food supplies from reaching his people and castles. In 1264, by the will of his deceased sister Mabilia, he received land near Parma which had been the property of his brother-in-law Azzo VII of Este. His youngest sister Isabella inherited the marquisate from him on his death in 1278.

== Sources ==
- Miller, William (1908). "The Marquisate of Boudonitza (1204–1414)". Journal of Hellenic Studies. 28 (2): 234–249. doi:10.2307/624608. JSTOR 624608. S2CID 162336648.
- Setton, Kenneth M.; Hazard, Harry W., eds. (1975). A History of the Crusades, Volume III: The Fourteenth and Fifteenth Centuries. Madison and London: University of Wisconsin Press. ISBN 0-299-06670-3.

Preceded by Guy Pallavicini	Marquess of Bodonitsa; 1237–1278	Succeeded by Isabella Pallavicini
