= Barony of Vostitsa =

European polity

- Barony of the Principality of Achaea
- 1209–1428
- Map of the Peloponnese with its principal locations during the late Middle Ages
- Capital: Vostitsa
- Area
  - Coordinates: 38°15′N 22°5′E
  - Type: Feudal lordship
- Historical era: Middle Ages
  - Established: 1209
  - Byzantine reconquest: 1428
Succeeded by
Despotate of the Morea

The Barony of Vostitsa was a medieval Frankish fiefdom of the Principality of Achaea, located in the northern coast of the Peloponnese peninsula in Greece, centred on the town of Vostitsa (Greek: Βοστίτζα; French: La Vostice; Italian: Lagostica; modern Aigio).

== History ==
The Barony of Vostitsa was established ca. 1209, after the conquest of the Peloponnese by the Crusaders, and was one of the original twelve secular baronies within the Principality of Achaea. The barony, with eight knight's fiefs attached to it, was given to Hugh I of Charpigny. The origin and name of the family is unclear, due to the differing attestations of his name in the main source, the various versions of the Chronicle of the Morea. The Greek version gives his surname as "de Lele", which has been commonly interpreted as being a corruption of "de Lille", and claims that he adopted the surname "de Charpigny" afterwards; while the Aragonese version of the Chronicle mentions that the first baron was Guy, that Hugh was his son, named "Cherpini" after the Greek village where he was born (which some authors identify with Kerpini), and "Lello" was the name of a fortress constructed on the family's domains in Laconia (possibly Helos); to further complicate matters, the toponym "Charpigny" is not attested in contemporary France.

With the establishment of the Byzantine province of Mystras in the 1260s, and the subsequent wars that saw much of the Peloponnese overrun by the Byzantine Greeks, by ca. 1320 Vostitsa, along with Chalandritsa and Patras, were the only surviving out of the twelve original baronies to be still in Latin hands. The Charpignys held the barony until the early 14th century, when the direct male line became extinct (sometime before 1316). The Prince of Achaea, Louis of Burgundy, married the heiress of the barony to Dreux of Charny, who also received the barony of the de Nivelet family.

The family history of the Charpigny-Charny clan between 1316 and 1356 is obscure. Dreux's brother, Geoffrey, is attested, but he does not seem to have inherited any lands. However, in 1327 a lady Agnes, daughter of a certain Geoffrey de Charpigny (according to Karl Hopf, who thought he was a son of Hugh II), is mentioned as entering possession of her "maternal heritage", and it was Guillemette of Charny, the (alleged) daughter of Geoffrey de Charny, who succeeded the two baronies along with her husband, Philip of Jonvelle (married in 1344). Various suggestions have been made to simplify the family tree, such as Agnes being the unnamed wife of Dreux of Charny, with Guillemette as her sister. According to Raymond-Joseph Loenertz, these genealogical problems have been created by some lapsus in Du Cange's work Histoire de l’Empire de Constantinople sous les empereurs français, complicated by Hopf's habit of presenting his own (sometimes gratuitous or unfounded) hypotheses as facts. Agnes of Charpigny, daughter and heiress of Hugh II of Charpigny, would then have been the wife of Dreux of Charny, and the mother of his daughter Guillemette, Philip of Jonvelle's wife. In 1359, the rights to both baronies were purchased from Guillemette and Philip by Marie of Bourbon, who sold them on to Nerio I Acciaioli in 1363. The barony was seized by the Navarrese Company ca. 1380, and held thereafter. By 1391 it was in the hands of Pedro de San Superano, who became Prince of Achaea in 1395. Vostitsa then became part of the princely domain, and on San Superano's death passed to the new princely line, the Zaccaria, until 1428, when it was lost to the Greek Despot of the Morea, Theodore II Palaiologos, who passed it on to his brother, Constantine.

== Barons of Vostitsa ==
After A. Bon:

- Hugh I of Charpigny, ca. 1209 – mid-13th century
- Guy of Charpigny, mid-13th century – 1295
- Hugh II of Charpigny, 1295 – after 1304/before 1316
- Unknown daughter of Hugh II, with her husband Dreux of Charny, 1316 – unknown
- Agnes (?) 1326 – unknown
- Guillemette of Charny, with her husband Philip of Jonvelle, before ca. 1344 – 1359
- Marie of Bourbon, 1359–1363
- Nerio I Acciaioli, 1363 – unknown (de facto until ca. 1380)
- Pedro de San Superano before 1391 – 1402
- Maria II Zaccaria, 1402–1404
- Centurione II Zaccaria, 1404–1428

== Sources ==
- Bon, Antoine (1969). La Morée franque. Recherches historiques, topographiques et archéologiques sur la principauté d'Achaïe [The Frankish Morea. Historical, Topographic and Archaeological Studies on the Principality of Achaea] (in French). Paris: De Boccard. OCLC 869621129.
- Loenertz, Raymond-Joseph (1975). Les Ghisi, dynastes vénitiens dans l'Archipel (1207-1390) (in French). Florence: Olschki.
- Miller, William (1921). Essays on the Latin Orient. Cambridge: Cambridge University Press. OCLC 457893641.
- Topping, Peter (1975). "The Morea, 1311–1364". In Setton, Kenneth M.; Hazard, Harry W. (eds.). A History of the Crusades, Volume III: The Fourteenth and Fifteenth Centuries. Madison and London: University of Wisconsin Press. pp. 104–140. ISBN 0-299-06670-3.
- Topping, Peter (1975). "The Morea, 1364–1460". In Setton, Kenneth M.; Hazard, Harry W. (eds.). A History of the Crusades, Volume III: The Fourteenth and Fifteenth Centuries. Madison and London: University of Wisconsin Press. pp. 141–166. ISBN 0-299-06670-3.
