= Helena Angelina Komnene =

Duchess - Regent of Athens

Helena Angelina Komnene (Greek: Ἑλένη Ἀγγελίνα Κομνηνή, fl. 1275–1291) was a Duchess of Athens by marriage to William I de la Roche, and regent of the Duchy of Athens during the minority of her son from 1287.

== Life ==
She was a daughter of the Greek sebastokrator John I Doukas, ruler of Thessaly in ca. 1268–1289, and a Greek princess of Aromanian origin, known only by her monastic name, Hypomone.

In 1275, the Byzantine Emperor Michael VIII Palaiologos sent a large army to subdue her recalcitrant father. The Byzantine army besieged John's capital of Neopatras, but he managed to flee and seek the aid of the Duke of Athens, John I de la Roche (r. 1263–1280). John I gave the necessary aid to the sebastokrator, in exchange for the marriage of Helena to his brother, William I de la Roche, the future Duke of Athens (r. 1280–1287). The Duchy also acquired the towns of Siderokastron, Zeitounion, Gravia, and Gardiki as her dowry.

The couple had a son, Guy II de la Roche (r. 1287–1308). Following William's death, Helena served as regent for her underage son until his coming of age. In 1289, she refused to recognize the suzerainty of the new Prince of Achaea, Florent of Hainaut, and the Angevin King of Naples, Charles II, as the common liege-lord of all Frankish states in Greece, had to force her to submit. In 1291 she married Hugh of Brienne, Count of Lecce, who became the bailli of the Athenian duchy. This allowed Helena once again to challenge Achaen suzerainty, and insist on her right to do homage directly to the King of Naples. Charles II vacillated, but in the end Florent of Hainaut prevailed, and when Guy II of Athens came of age in 1296, he recognized Florent and his wife, Isabella of Villehardouin, as his liege-lords.

== Sources ==
- Fine, John V. A. Jr. (1994) [1987]. The Late Medieval Balkans: A Critical Survey from the Late Twelfth Century to the Ottoman Conquest. Ann Arbor, Michigan: University of Michigan Press. ISBN 978-0-472-10079-8.
- Longnon, Jean (1969) [1962]. "The Frankish States in Greece, 1204–1311". In Setton, Kenneth M.; Wolff, Robert Lee; Hazard, Harry W. (eds.). A History of the Crusades, Volume II: The Later Crusades, 1189–1311. Vol. 2 (Second ed.). Madison, Milwaukee, and London: University of Wisconsin Press. pp. 234–275. ISBN 0-299-04844-6.
- Polemis, Demetrios I. (1968). The Doukai: A Contribution to Byzantine Prosopography. London: The Athlone Press.
- Trapp, Erich; Beyer, Hans-Veit; Walther, Rainer; Sturm-Schnabl, Katja; Kislinger, Ewald; Leontiadis, Ioannis; Kaplaneres, Sokrates (1976–1996). Prosopographisches Lexikon der Palaiologenzeit (in German). Vienna: Verlag der Österreichischen Akademie der Wissenschaften. ISBN 3-7001-3003-1.
