= Engilbert of Liederkerque =

Flemish knight

Engilbert of Liederkerque (fl. 1289–1305) was a Flemish knight (from Liedekerke) who, along with his younger brother Walter, accompanied their uncle Florent of Hainaut to the Peloponnese (Morea) in southern Greece, following Florent's proclamation as Prince of Achaea in 1289. There, Engilbert married a daughter of Richard Orsini, Count palatine of Cephalonia and Zakynthos. In 1294, after the death of John Chauderon, who was his brother-in-law, Engilbert succeeded him as Grand Constable of Achaea.

Engilbert is mentioned only sporadically in the sources: in 1297, when he accompanied Princess Isabella of Villehardouin to Nesi near Kalamata; in 1301 among the Moreote barons who ratified the proclamation of Philip of Savoy as Prince; in early 1304 as one of the witnesses to the marriage of John I Orsini to Maria Komnene Doukaina, and in the act of donation of the fortresses of Karytaina and Araklovon to Isabella's daughter Matilda of Hainaut; and finally in the act of December 1305 signed at Thebes.

== Sources ==
- Bon, Antoine (1969). La Morée franque. Recherches historiques, topographiques et archéologiques sur la principauté d'Achaïe (in French). Paris: De Boccard.
