= Giovanni Battista Ayroli =

Doge of the Republic of Genoa

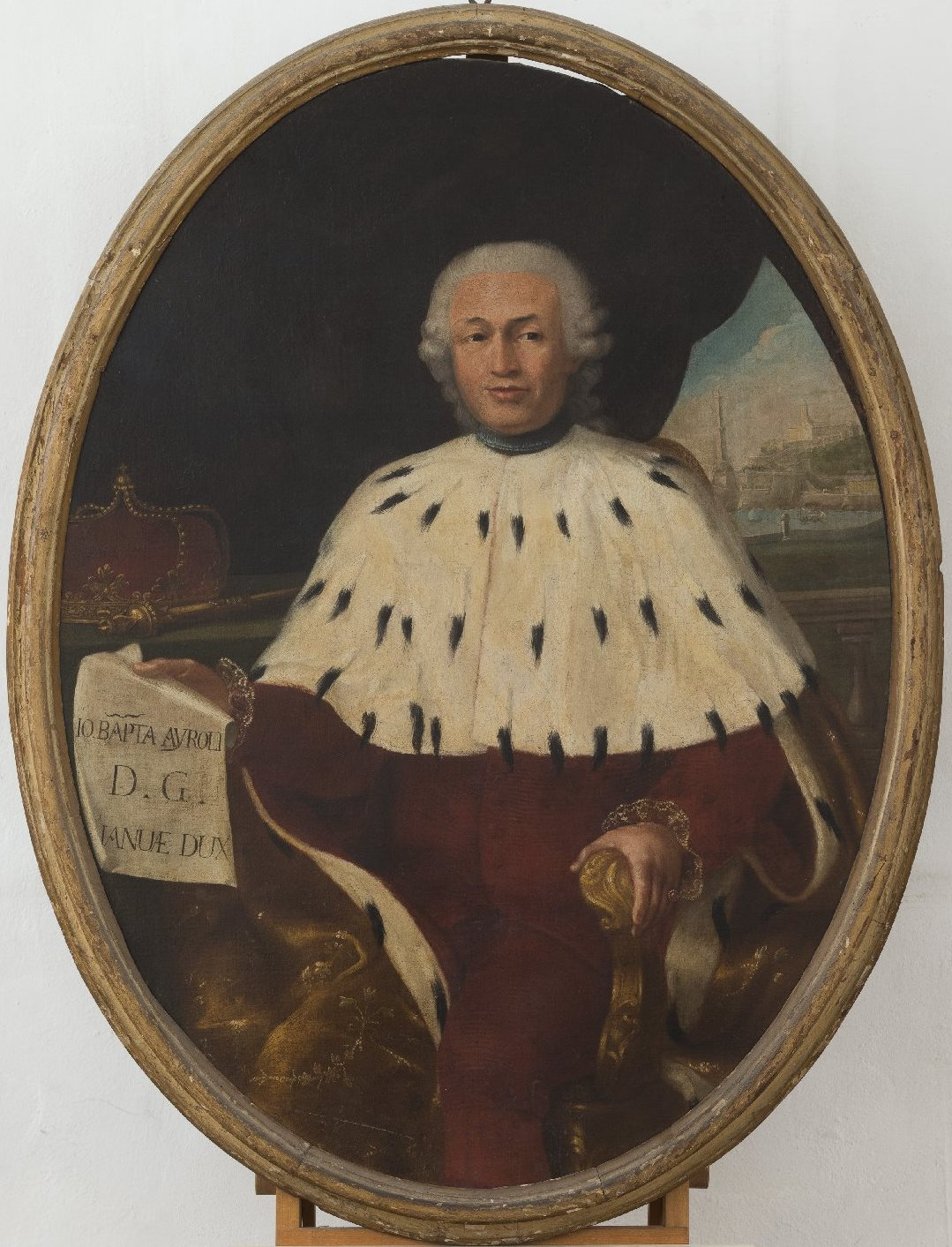

178th Doge of the Republic of Genoa
- In office May 6, 1783 – May 6, 1785
- Preceded by: Marco Antonio Gentile
- Succeeded by: Gian Carlo Pallavicino

Personal details
- Born: 1731 Genoa, Republic of Genoa
- Died: 1808 (aged 76–77) Genoa, First French Empire

Giovanni Battista Ayroli (Genoa, 1731 - Genoa, 1808) was the 178th Doge of the Republic of Genoa.

== Biography ==
In his Dogal mandate, the one hundred and thirty-third in biennial succession and the one hundred and seventy-eighth in republican history, a new Academy of Science (also called "degli Industriosi") was established in Genoa and many ruling personalities visited the republican capital, including the Duke and Governor of the Duchy of Milan, Ferdinand Karl. After the end of his mandate, which expired on 6 May 1785, Giovanni Battista Ayroli ran again for the customs elections, having as opponents Gian Carlo Pallavicino, leader of the liberal Genoese faction, which aimed to modernize the institutional structures of the Republic, making it practically a constitutional monarchy, and the former doge Marco Antonio Gentile. Ayroli died in Genoa in 1808.

== See also ==
- Republic of Genoa
- Doge of Genoa

== Sources ==
- Buonadonna, Sergio. Rosso doge. I dogi della Repubblica di Genova dal 1339 al 1797.
