= Otho of Saint-Omer =

Otho of Saint Omer was the lord of half of Thebes in Frankish Greece from 1294 to ca. 1299.

He was a younger son of Bela of Saint Omer and Bonne de la Roche, sister of the Lord of Athens and Thebes, Guy I de la Roche. Upon their marriage, in 1240, Guy gave Bela the lordship over half of Thebes. Otho participated, along with his brothers Nicholas II and John, in the War of the Euboeote Succession in the ranks of the coalition of most of the princes of Frankish Greece, who opposed the expansionist policies of the Prince of Achaea, William II of Villehardouin.

Otho was married to Margarita da Verona. After Nicholas II's death in 1294, he succeeded him as lord of one half of Thebes until his own death, sometime before 1299.

== Sources ==
- Longnon, Jean (1969) [1962]. "The Frankish States in Greece, 1204–1311". In Setton, Kenneth M.; Wolff, Robert Lee; Hazard, Harry W. (eds.). A History of the Crusades, Volume II: The Later Crusades, 1189–1311. Vol. 2 (Second ed.). Madison, Milwaukee, and London: University of Wisconsin Press. pp. 234–275. ISBN 0-299-04844-6.
- Trapp, Erich; Beyer, Hans-Veit; Kaplaneres, Sokrates; Leontiadis, Ioannis (1990). "24702. Σαῖντ ̓Ομέρ, ῎Οτον ντὲ". Prosopographisches Lexikon der Palaiologenzeit (in German). Vol. 10. Vienna: Verlag der Österreichischen Akademie der Wissenschaften. ISBN 3-7001-3003-1.

Preceded by Nicholas II of Saint Omer	Lord of one half of Thebes; 1294 – before 1299	Succeeded by Nicholas III of Saint Omer
