= Raffaele Agostino De Ferrari =

Doge of the Republic of Genoa

180th Doge of the Republic of Genoa
- In office 4 July 1787 – 4 July 1789
- Preceded by: Gian Carlo Pallavicino
- Succeeded by: Alerame Maria Pallavicini

Personal details
- Born: 20 July 1732 Genoa, Republic of Genoa
- Died: 17 January 1801 (aged 68) Genoa, Ligurian Republic

Raffaele Agostino De Ferrari (Genoa, 20 July 1732 - Genoa, 17 January 1801) was the 180th Doge of the Republic of Genoa.

== Biography ==
The son of Gerolamo De Ferrari and Isabella Adorno, he was born in Genoa on July 20, 1732, and was baptized in the basilica of Santa Maria delle Vigne.

Ascribed to the Golden Book of Genoese nobility on December 6, 1754, along with his brother Baldassarre, for the next twenty years he apparently never held public office for the Republic of Genoa. It was only in 1774 that Raffaele Agostino De Ferrari's name appears among the members of the Senate, and several times he was senator until his dogal appointment, father of the Commune in 1776, attaché to the Junta di Marina and to the Borders in 1780, syndicator of the Civil Wheel in 1783 (he then had to resign in 1784 because of a case concerning him that was to be heard in that court), protector of the Bank of Saint George in 1786.

On 4 July 1787, the Grand Council elected him to lead the Genoese state, the one hundred and thirty-fifth in two-year succession and the one hundred and eighty in republican history. During his mandate there was the fortunate capture, on 11 August 1788, in the waters in front of the town of Bordighera, of an Algerian Xebec, of the 117 Turkish sailors taken prisoner by the Genoese galleys San Giorgio and Raggio, 50 were killed. The dogal two-year period ended on 4 July 1789.

During the rule of the Provisional Government of the Ligurian Republic, established after the fall of the Genoese republic following the French Revolution, he was believed to be one of those responsible along with other nobles for the popular uprisings in the Bisagno and Val Polcevera against the new pro-French state. Arrested and closely guarded he remained imprisoned with 11 other members of the Genoese nobility believed to be "always enemies of the present system and fond of its former government." He died in Genoa on January 17, 1801, finding burial in the shrine of Our Lady Crowned in Coronata.

In private life he married Settimia Spinola, and only his eldest son Andrea benefited from his substantial estate. His grandson Luigi Raffaele De Ferrari was the husband of Marquise Maria Brignole Sale De Ferrari.

== Personal life ==
He was married to Settimia Spinola. His nephew Raffaele de Ferrari was the husband of the Marquise Maria Brignole Sale De Ferrari. Raffaele Agostino De Ferrari died in Genoa in 1801.

== See also ==
- Republic of Genoa
- Doge of Genoa
