= Walter of Liederkerque =

Walter of Liederkerque was a Flemish knight (from Liedekerke) who, along with his older brother Engilbert, accompanied their uncle Florent of Hainaut to the Peloponnese in southern Greece, following Florent's proclamation as Prince of Achaea in 1289. There he was named governor of Corinth and its surrounding region.

Walter carried on an extravagant lifestyle, which left him short of funds. In a famous incident, recorded in the Chronicle of the Morea, he imprisoned a Greek magnate called Photios in hopes of forcing him to ransom his freedom for 10,000 hyperpyra. In the end, Photios secured his liberty by paying 1,000 hyperpyra, but the injustice rankled. A short time after, in 1295, Photios met a Frankish lord, Guy of Charpigny, on his way and, mistaking him for Walter, he killed him.

== Sources ==
- Bon, Antoine (1969). La Morée franque. Recherches historiques, topographiques et archéologiques sur la principauté d'Achaïe (in French). Paris: De Boccard.
