= Gian Carlo Pallavicino =

Doge of the Republic of Genoa and king of Corsica

179th Doge of the Republic of Genoa
- In office 6 June 1785 – 6 June 1787
- Preceded by: Giovanni Battista Ayroli
- Succeeded by: Raffaele Agostino De Ferrari

Personal details
- Born: 1722 Genoa, Republic of Genoa
- Died: 1794 (aged 71-72) Genoa, Republic of Genoa

Gian Carlo Pallavicino (Genoa, 1722 - Genoa, 1794) was the 179th Doge of the Republic of Genoa.

== Biography ==
Pallavicino rose to dogal power with the election of 6 June 1785 where the members of the Grand Council preferred the candidacy of Gian Carlo Pallavicino, representative of that liberal faction that aimed to modernize the institutional structures of the Republic of Genoa, compared to other candidates and former doges Marco Antonio Gentile and Giovanni Battista Ayroli. In its two-year mandate, the one hundred and thirty-fourth in two-year succession and the one hundred and seventy-ninth in republican history, the first economic and literary society was established in Genoa, born in 1786 to promote agricultural, trade and art activities; from 1791 similar companies were founded in Chiavari, in Albenga and Savona. His Dogate ceased on 6 June 1787. Gian Carlo Pallavicino died in Genoa during 1794.

== See also ==
- Republic of Genoa
- Doge of Genoa
- Pallavicini family
