= Alexios Kaballarios =

Byzantine aristocrat

Alexios Kaballarios or Kaballares (Ancient Greek: Ἀλέξιος Καβαλλάριος/Καβαλλάρης) was a Byzantine aristocrat and military commander, cousin of Emperor Michael VIII Palaiologos (r. 1259–1282).

He participated in the Byzantine campaigns in the Morea in the early 1260s, and was taken prisoner by William II of Villehardouin after the Battle of Makryplagi (1263/64).

Apparently released at some later date, in c. 1270, he held the offices of domestikos tes trapezes and governor in Thessaly or Thessalonica.

Along with his cousin, the despotes John Palaiologos, he led a Byzantine army against John I Doukas of Thessaly, but was defeated and killed in the Battle of Neopatras in c. 1273/74.

== Sources ==
- Geanakoplos, Deno John (1959). Emperor Michael Palaeologus and the West, 1258–1282: A Study in Byzantine-Latin Relations. Cambridge, Massachusetts: Harvard University Press.
- Kazhdan, Alexander (1991). "Kaballarios". In Kazhdan, Alexander (ed.). The Oxford Dictionary of Byzantium. Oxford and New York: Oxford University Press. p. 1087. ISBN 0-19-504652-8.
- Trapp, Erich; Beyer, Hans-Veit; Walther, Rainer; Sturm-Schnabl, Katja; Kislinger, Ewald; Leontiadis, Ioannis; Kaplaneres, Sokrates (1976–1996). Prosopographisches Lexikon der Palaiologenzeit (in German). Vienna: Verlag der Österreichischen Akademie der Wissenschaften. ISBN 3-7001-3003-1.
