= Sant Omer =

Italian composer

A musician named Sant Omer or hailing from the Flemish town of Saint-Omer near (the then English town) of Calais is specified as the composer of a three-voice Sanctus in the early fifteenth century music manuscript, Padua, Biblioteca Universitaria, MS 1475. Fragments of the Sanctus are also found in a manuscript formerly in Budapest, discovered in 1990 but now lost. The style of the piece has been described as "archaic" with modal rhythms resembling those of the Mass of Tournai. It is one of several pieces described as part of the "Stili Vaganti" by Francesco Facchin. Adjacent to the Paduan Sanctus is an Agnus Dei in similar style which may be by the same composer.

The Sanctus has been edited and completed by Giulio Cattin and Francesco Facchin in Polyphonic Music of the Fourteenth Century vol. 23B, pp. 434–44, though it is marked as an anonymous composition.
