= Maria dalle Carceri =

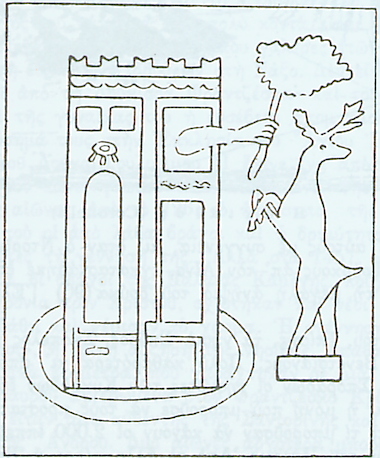
Della Carceri of Euboea coat of arms

Maria dalle Carceri (died 1323) was sovereign marchioness of Bodonitsa from 1311 until 1323. She succeeded her late spouse Albert Pallavicini on his death in 1311. While she avoided submitting her principality to the Catalan Company, she could not avoid paying an annual tribute of four destriers.

Maria was descended from a Lombard family of Verona that had come to Greece on the Fourth Crusade. She was a daughter of Gaetano dalle Carceri and heiress of a sixth of Euboea. She married Albert, and after his death she and their daughter Guglielma split the Marquisate between them, as required by law. Considering the recent Catalan victory at Halmyros, Maria desired to marry again quickly to a man who would protect hers and her daughter's possessions. She married Andrea Cornaro and Guglielma inherited the whole marquisate on his death.

== Sources ==
- Miller, William (1908). "The Marquisate of Boudonitza (1204–1414)". Journal of Hellenic Studies. 28 (2): 234–249. doi:10.2307/624608. JSTOR 624608.
- Setton, Kenneth M. (general editor) A History of the Crusades: Volume III — The Fourteenth and Fifteenth Centuries. Harry W. Hazard, editor. University of Wisconsin Press: Madison, 1975.

Preceded by Albert Pallavicini	Marchioness of Bodonitsa; 1311–1323 with Guglielma Pallavicini and Andrea Cornaro	Succeeded by Guglielma Pallavicini
