= Guy Pallavicini =

13th-century crusader and marquess of Bodonitsa (modern Greece)

Marquess of Bodonitsa
- Reign: 1204 – c. 1237
- Successor: Ubertino Pallavicini
- Spouse: Sibylla
- Issue: Ubertino, Mabilia, Isabella
- House: House of Pallavicini

Guy or Guido Pallavicini, called Marchesopoulo by his Greek subjects, was the first marquess of Bodonitsa in Frankish Greece from 1204 to his death in or shortly after 1237. He was one of the most important Frankish rulers in Greece, and played a major role in the short-lived Kingdom of Thessalonica: in 1208–1209 he supported the Lombard rebellion against King Demetrius of Montferrat, but by 1221 he was the kingdom's regent (bailli), and was left to defend the city against the ruler of Epirus, Theodore Komnenos Doukas. Left unsupported by the Latin Empire, and with a projected crusade to relieve the city delayed, he surrendered the city in December 1224. The belated arrival of the crusade helped to save his own fief from falling to the Epirotes, however, and he was soon able to return there, dying on or shortly after 1237.

== Life ==
Guido hailed from a distinguished family of Lombardy in northern Italy, that ruled over a series of fiefs in the area between Parma, Piacenza, and Cremona. In 1203, Guy joined the Fourth Crusade—according to William Miller, "because at home every common man could hale him before the courts".

=== Early activity ===
Greek and Latin states in southern Greece, c. 1210

In autumn 1204, following the sack of Constantinople by the Crusaders and the division of the Byzantine Empire among the Crusader leaders, he accompanied Boniface of Montferrat as he went west to establish his Kingdom of Thessalonica. During Boniface's march south into Greece, Guy was appointed warden of the strategic pass of Thermopylae. Guy made the nearby settlement of Bodonitsa (modern Mendenitsa) his seat, erecting a castle on the ruins of an ancient acropolis, probably that of Pharygai, which gave wide sight over the coastal plain around the Malian Gulf. The exact bounds of the marquisate are unknown, but it lay between the northern boundaries of the Duchy of Athens and the town of Zetouni (modern Lamia), which was partially owned by Guy. The Chronicle of the Morea reports that Boniface soon transferred suzerainty over Bodonitsa to the Prince of Achaea, William of Champlitte (r. 1205–1209); however, the report of Marino Sanudo Torsello, that this only occurred under Geoffrey II of Villehardouin (r. c. 1229 – 1246), is more likely to be correct. According to the Chronicle, Guy participated in the long siege of the Acrocorinth, held by the Greek lord Leo Sgouros.

Boniface of Montferrat was killed fighting against the Bulgarians in 1207, leaving his infant son Demetrius (r. 1207–1224) as his successor. Guy and his brother, possibly named Rubino, became one of the leaders of the Lombard revolt against Demetrius and his mother Margaret of Hungary. The Lombard barons favoured Demetrius' older half-brother, William VI, Marquess of Montferrat, but were opposed by the Latin Emperor, Henry of Flanders (r. 1205–1216). Henry succeeded in outmanoeuvring them and in January 1208 crowned Demetrius king, but the barons launched a rebellion across the kingdom. Henry marched south, overcoming the opposition of the barons one by one; those he captured were treated leniently, however, and allowed to keep their fiefs. Guy was among the last to hold out, taking refuge in the Cadmeia of Thebes, rather than submit to Imperial judgment at the First Parliament of Ravennika. Emperor Henry was forced to begin preparations for a siege of the Cadmeia, before the Lombard barons agreed to surrender. Once again they were allowed to keep their fiefs, but now as imperial vassals.

Like most of the Latin lords of Greece, Guy had a difficult relationship with the Church in his domains: although he handed over Zetouni to the Knights Templar, he confiscated property belonging to the local bishopric of Thermopylae, and was negligent in the payment of the tithe to the Church. Although he most likely did not attend the Second Parliament of Ravennika in 1210, he ratified the concordat that attempted to settle the differences between the Church and the Latin lords.

=== Fall of the Kingdom of Thessalonica ===
Although suppressed, the Lombard rebellion undermined the foundations of Latin rule in Thessaly and Macedonia. Many of the Lombard barons remained unreconciled to King Demetrius, and left Greece for Italy over the following years. Thus the kingdom of Thessalonica quickly began crumbling under the assault of the Greek principality of Epirus. The Epirote ruler Michael I Komnenos Doukas (r. 1205–1214/15), and his brother and successor Theodore Komnenos Doukas (r. 1214/15–1230), conquered most of Thessaly and Macedonia, so that by 1221/22, Thessalonica was surrounded on all sides by Epirote territory and cut off from either the Latin Empire in the east or the Frankish states in southern Greece. In an attempt to gather support in the West, King Demetrius left for Italy in winter 1221/22, and Guy was appointed as regent (bailli) for Queen Margaret and Demetrius. In this capacity he ratified another convention that recognized the Church's property rights.

As bailli Guy was charged with the defence of Thessalonica against the Epirotes. Urgent calls for a crusade were made in the West, under the leadership of William VI of Montferrat, but in the event, only a small vanguard under the former regent, Count Oberto II of Biandrate, arrived at Thessalonica in summer 1222. The Latin Emperor Robert of Courtenay (r. 1221–1228) also promised aid and attacked Serres in April 1224, but the siege had to be abandoned following the disastrous defeat of the main Latin army at the hands of the Nicaean emperor John III Doukas Vatatzes (r. 1222–1245) at the Battle of Poimanenon. Left unsupported, the garrison of Thessalonica surrendered in December 1224. Theodore treated the surrendered Latins well, and eventually released most of them, including Guy, from captivity.

These events rendered Guy's small fief into a true border march between the Latin states of southern Greece and the territories recovered by the Greeks to the north. Bodonitsa had long provided shelter for Latin refugees, such as the Latin Archbishop of Larissa, who was appointed to the see of Thermopylae; in 1224, after the fall of Thessalonica, Pope Honorius III anxiously encouraged the other Latin rulers of southern Greece to aid in holding Bodonitsa, left leaderless in Guy's absence. Some aid was provided—some 1300 hyperpyra were gathered by the clergy alone—but Bodonitsa was saved more through her strong fortifications and the belated arrival of the crusade meant to relieve Thessalonica. The latter only sailed in March 1225, and landed in Thessaly at Halmyros. The Crusader army was soon decimated by disease, however: William of Montferrat himself succumbed to it and the remnants of the army left Greece. If it failed in its original objective, the crusade probably saved Bodonitsa and thereby halted Theodore's southern advance into Central Greece, which either way had never been Theodore's main objective.

=== Death and descendants ===
On 2 May 1237, Guy made his will. His date of death is unknown, but it is assumed that he probably died soon thereafter; one of the last living participants in the Fourth Crusade. He was succeeded by Ubertino, his son by the Burgundian Sibylla, a cousin of Guy I of Athens. The couple had also two daughters, Mabilia, who married Azzo VII d'Este, Marquess of Ferrara, and Isabella, who succeeded her brother as marchioness but died childless in 1286, leading to a dispute between her unnamed husband and Thomas Pallavicini, who seized the castle of Bodonitsa and became the new marquess.

== Sources ==
- Bredenkamp, François (1996). The Byzantine Empire of Thessaloniki (1224–1242). Thessaloniki: Thessaloniki History Center. ISBN 9608433177.
- Fine, John V. A., Jr. (1994) [1987]. The Late Medieval Balkans: A Critical Survey from the Late Twelfth Century to the Ottoman Conquest. Ann Arbor, Michigan: University of Michigan Press. ISBN 978-0-472-10079-8.
- Miller, William (1908). "The Marquisate of Boudonitza (1204–1414)". Journal of Hellenic Studies. 28 (2): 234–249. doi:10.2307/624608. JSTOR 624608.
- Setton, Kenneth M. (1976). The Papacy and the Levant (1204–1571), Volume I: The Thirteenth and Fourteenth Centuries. Vol. 1. Philadelphia: The American Philosophical Society. ISBN 0-87169-114-0.
- Wolff, Robert Lee (1969) [1962]. "The Latin Empire of Constantinople, 1204–1261". In Setton, Kenneth M.; Wolff, Robert Lee; Hazard, Harry W. (eds.). A History of the Crusades, Volume II: The Later Crusades, 1189–1311. Vol. 2 (Second ed.). Madison, Milwaukee, and London: University of Wisconsin Press. pp. 186–233. ISBN 0-299-04844-6.

New title	Marquess of Bodonitsa; 1204–1237	Succeeded by Ubertino Pallavicini
Vacant Title last held by Berthold of Katzenelnbogen	Bailli of the Kingdom of Thessalonica; 1221–1224	Fall of Thessalonica to Theodore Komnenos Doukas
