= Bela of Saint-Omer =

- Issue: Nicholas II of Saint Omer; Otho of Saint Omer; John of Saint Omer

Bela of Saint Omer was a French knight, descended from a Fauquembergues family who were castellans of the eponymous castle of Saint-Omer.

His father, Nicholas I of Saint Omer, received lands in Boeotia in the aftermath of the Fourth Crusade. He later married Margaret of Hungary, the widow of Boniface of Montferrat, Lord of Thessalonica (died 1207). It is unclear when the marriage took place: some accounts mention that Nicholas died already in 1212 (probably by a misreading of the genealogical table published by Karl Hopf in Chroniques gréco-romanes inédites ou peu connues) but F. Van Tricht dates the marriage to after 1217 and J. Longnon "not before 1223".

Bela, who was named after his maternal grandfather, Béla III of Hungary, was the eldest son of the couple, and was followed by his brother William. In 1240, Bela married the sister of the Lord of Athens and Thebes, Guy I de la Roche. As part of her dowry, he received one half of Thebes as his domain. They had three sons, Nicholas II of Saint Omer (d. 1294), who succeeded in Thebes, Otho of Saint Omer (d. before 1299), and John of Saint Omer (d. 1311), who became Marshal of the Principality of Achaea.

== Sources ==
- Bon, Antoine (1969). La Morée franque. Recherches historiques, topographiques et archéologiques sur la principauté d'Achaïe [The Frankish Morea. Historical, Topographic and Archaeological Studies on the Principality of Achaea] (in French). Paris: De Boccard. OCLC 869621129.
- Longnon, Jean (1969) [1962]. "The Frankish States in Greece, 1204–1311". In Setton, Kenneth M.; Wolff, Robert Lee; Hazard, Harry W. (eds.). A History of the Crusades, Volume II: The Later Crusades, 1189–1311. Vol. 2 (Second ed.). Madison, Milwaukee, and London: University of Wisconsin Press. pp. 234–275. ISBN 0-299-04844-6.
- Perra, Foteini (2011). Οικογένεια Σεντ Ομέρ. Encyclopedia of the Hellenic World, Boeotia (in Greek). Foundation of the Hellenic World.
- Van Tricht, Filip (2011). The Latin Renovatio of Byzantium: The Empire of Constantinople (1204–1228). Leiden: Brill. ISBN 978-90-04-20323-5.

New title	Lord of one half of Thebes; 1240–1258	Succeeded by Nicholas II of Saint Omer
