= Thomas Pallavicini =

Thomas Pallavicini (Italian: Tommaso Pallavicini) was the marquess of Bodonitsa following a disputed succession in 1286. He was the grandson of Rubino, younger brother of Guy, the first margrave.

In 1286, the marchioness Isabella, Guy's daughter, died childless and the marquisate was immediately the subject of disputed claims: that of Thomas and that of her widower. Bodonitsa was a vassal of the Principality of Achaea, which was held by the bailli William de la Roche, the duke of Athens, at the time. William, though a relative of the Pallavicini, presiding in his capacity as bailiff over the feudal court of Achaea, did not decide for Thomas as successor of Isabella before Thomas seized the castle of Bodonitsa and thus installed himself undisputedly as master of the march. He ruled it quietly for an unknown period of time, perhaps beyond 1300, and transmitted it to his son Albert.

== Sources ==
- Miller, William (1908). "The Marquisate of Boudonitza (1204–1414)". Journal of Hellenic Studies. 28 (2): 234–249. doi:10.2307/624608. JSTOR 624608. S2CID 162336648.

| Preceded by Isabella Pallavicini | Marquess of Bodonitsa; 1286 – c. 1300 | Succeeded by Albert Pallavicini |
