= Piersandro Pallavicini =

Italian author

Piersandro Pallavicini (born in Vigevano, 1962) is an Italian writer and professor of chemistry at the University of Pavia.

== Personal ==
Pallavicini started publishing short stories on literary magazines, such as Versodove, Addictions, 'Tina ans Fernandel, in the early Nineties. Fernandel published his collection of stories Anime al neon (2002). He collaborates among other things with the literary magazine Tuttolibri, edited by La Stampa.

African Inferno (2009). deals with the theme of immigration to Italy from Africa, a theme which re-occurs frequently in his work. A particular feature of these books is that they can only be obtained from street-vendors affiliated to "Ediarco" which receives 50% of the cover price.

== Short stories ==
- Anime al neon (Fernandel, 2002)
- Afro Beats (dell'Arco, 2006)
- L'Africa nel piatto (dell'Arco, 2008)
- London Angel (e-book in the series "Zoom", Feltrinelli, 2012)
- Racconti per signora (three short stories; e-book in the "Zoom" collection, Feltrinelli, 2013)
- L'ombrello di Steed e tutti gli altri racconti (collection of short stories 1997–2001; e-book, Terra ferma, 2014?)
- Dalle parti di Arenzano (e-book in the series "Zoom", Feltrinelli, 2014)
- Guardale le macchine (short story for yeerida.com, 2016)

== Novels ==
- Il mostro di Vigevano (1999). The Monster of Vigevano
- Madre nostra che sarai nei cieli (2002). Our Mother Who Art in Heaven
- Atomico Dandy (2005). Atomic Dandy
- African Inferno (2009).
- A braccia aperte (2010). With Open Arms
- Romanzo per signora (2012). A Novel for a Lady
- Una commedia italiana (2014). An Italian Comedy
- La chimica della bellezza (2016). The Chemistry of Beauty

== Non-fiction ==
- Quei bravi ragazzi del rock progressivo (Theoria, 1998)
- Riviste anni '90: L'altro spazio della nuova narrativa (Fernandel, 1999)
- Mastronardi e il suo mondo (with Antonella Ramazzina, Otto/Novecento, 1999)
