= Marco Antonio Gentile =

Doge of the Republic of Genoa and king of Corsica

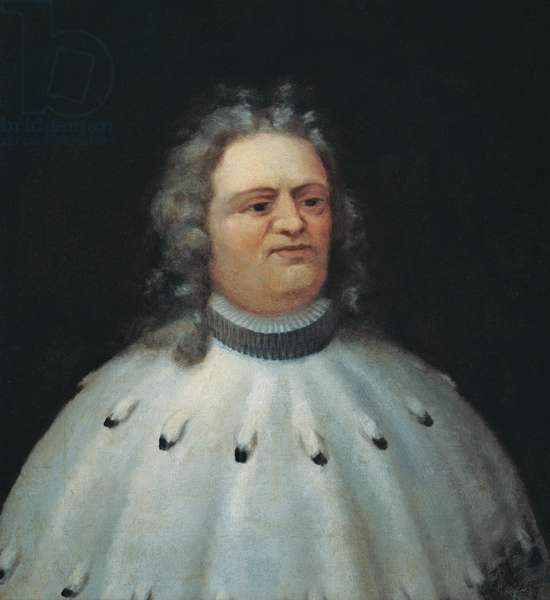

177th Doge of the Republic of Genoa
- In office March 8, 1781 – March 8, 1783
- Preceded by: Giacomo Maria Brignole
- Succeeded by: Giovanni Battista Ayroli

Personal details
- Born: 1723 Genoa, Republic of Genoa
- Died: 1798 (aged 74–75) Genoa, Ligurian Republic

Marco Antonio Gentile (Genoa, 1723 - Genoa, 1798) was the 177th Doge of the Republic of Genoa.

== Biography ==
During his mandate as Doge, Gentile was highly respected, as he enriched the city library, increased the botanical garden and was the first doge to visit the university. He was also a keen supporter of a more active foreign policy based on the alliance with Austria and England. After the end of his mandate, which expired on March 8, 1783, he ran again in the customs elections in 1785, but was defeated. Marco Antonio Gentile eventually died in 1798, at the age of 75, without marrying and without children.

== See also ==
- Republic of Genoa
- Doge of Genoa
