= Marquisate of Bodonitsa =

Historical Marquisiate in modern day Greece

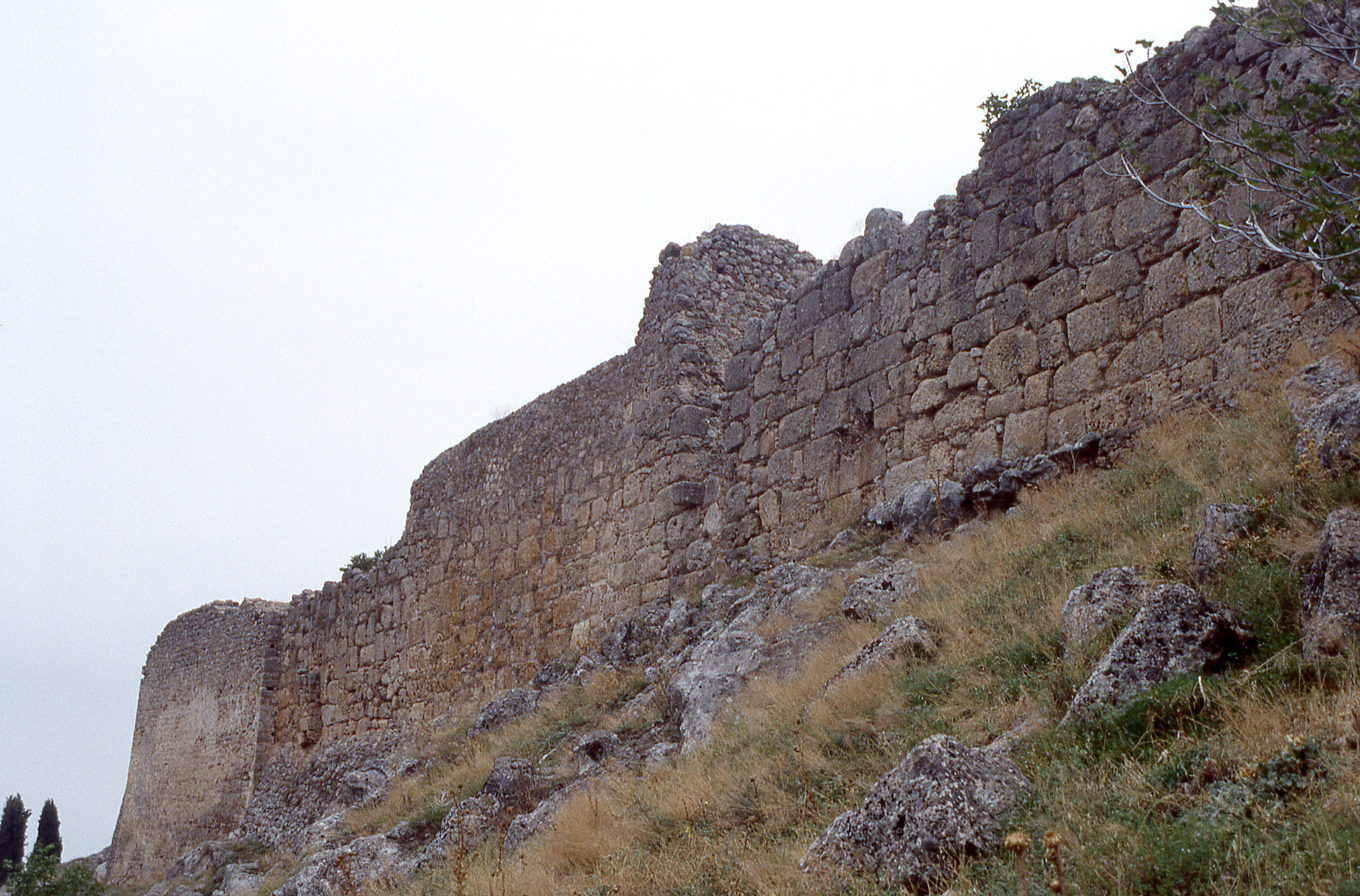

The Margraviate or Marquisate of Bodonitsa (also Vodonitsa or Boudonitza; Greek: Μαρκιωνία/Μαρκιζᾶτον τῆς Βοδονίτσας) was a state of the Frankish Greece, located in present-day Mendenitsa, Phthiotis (180 km northwest of Athens), following the conquests of the Fourth Crusade. It was originally granted as a margravial holding of Guy Pallavicini by Boniface, first king of Thessalonica, in 1204. Its original purpose was to guard the pass of Thermopylae.

The marquisate survived the fall of Thessalonica after the death of Boniface, but it was made subservient to the Principality of Achaea in 1248. The marquisate further survived the coming of the Catalan Company in 1311, but it fell to two Venetian families in quick succession: Cornaro (till 1335) and the Zorzi. Among the eighteen Catalan vassals of the area in 1380-1 the Margrave of Bodonitsa ranks third below Count Demitre and the Count of Salona. The Zorzi ruled the marquisate until the Ottoman Turks conquered it in 1414. Nicholas II continued to use the margravial title after that date, but the territory was never recovered.

== Margraves ==
=== Pallavicini ===
Thomas inherited the Pallavicini margraviate after a dispute with Isabella's widower. He was a grandson of Rubino, brother of Guy.

- 1204 – 1237 Guy
- 1237 – 1278 Ubertino
- 1278 – 1286 Isabella
  - 1278 – 1286 (?) Antoine le Flamenc, husband (conjectured)
- 1286 – ca. 1300 Thomas
- ca. 1300 – 1311 Albert
  - 1311 – 1323 Maria dalle Carceri, wife
  - 1312 – 1323 Andrea Cornaro, husband of above
- 1311 – 1358 Guglielma
  - 1327 – 1334 Bartolommeo Zaccaria, husband

=== Zorzi ===
The first Zorzi was a husband of Guglielma.

- 1335 – 1345 Nicholas I
- 1345 – 1388 Francis
- 1388 – 1410 Jacob
- 1410 – 1414 Nicholas II
- 1414 – 1436 Nicholas III (in pretense)

== Sources ==
- Miller, William (1908). "The Marquisate of Boudonitza (1204–1414)". Journal of Hellenic Studies. 28 (2): 234–249. doi:10.2307/624608. JSTOR 624608. S2CID 162336648.
- Setton, Kenneth M.; Hazard, Harry W., eds. (1975). A History of the Crusades, Volume III: The Fourteenth and Fifteenth Centuries. Vol. 3. Madison and London: University of Wisconsin Press. ISBN 0-299-06670-3.
- Setton, Kenneth M. Catalan Domination of Athens 1311–1380. Revised edition. Variorum: London, 1975.
- Zakythinos, D. A. (1932). Le Despotat Grec de Morée: les Belles Lettres (in French). Paris.
