= John I de la Roche =

Duke of Athens

John I de la Roche (died 1280) succeeded his father, Guy I, as Duke of Athens in 1263. He was cultured and chivalrous, spoke fluent Greek, and read Herodotus.

In 1275, John, with 300 knights, relieved Neopatras, which had been blockaded by a Byzantine mercenary army. It was at this battle that he said "'Great are their numbers but few among them are true men," quoting Herodotus, who said, of the Battle of Thermopylae, "the Persian are great in their numbers but true men are far and few."

The next year (1276), the Byzantine Emperor Michael VIII Palaeologus invaded Euboea and Thessaly. John joined Gilbert of Verona to march to the relief of Negroponte, which was under attack by Licario. During a battle six miles to the north, at Vatonda, John was thrown from his horse and captured, along with Gilbert and many other knights.

In 1280 he died and was succeeded by his brother William.

Preceded by Guy I	Duke of Athens; 1263–1280	Succeeded by William I
