= Guy II de la Roche =

Duke of Athens

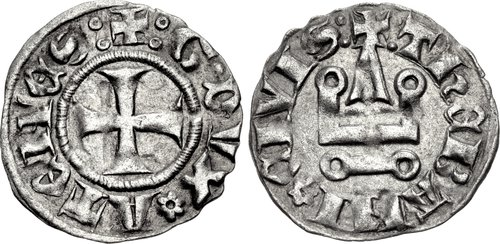
Silver denier of Guy II, minted at Thebes

Guy II de la Roche, also known as Guyot or Guidotto (1280 – 5 October 1308), was the Duke of Athens from 1287, the last duke of his family. He succeeded as a minor on the death of his father, William I, at a time when the duchy of Athens had exceeded the Principality of Achaea in wealth, power, and importance.

== Early life ==
Guy was the only son of William I de la Roche and Helena Angelina Komnene. William was the younger brother of the childless John I, whom he succeeded in 1280. His marriage to Helena, a daughter of sebastokrator John I Doukas, the Greek ruler of Thessaly, brought about an anti-Byzantine alliance between Athens and Thessaly around 1274. William acknowledged the suzerainty of the Angevin monarchs of the Kingdom of Sicily, who also ruled the Principality of Achaea to the south of Athens.

Guy was still a minor when his father died in 1287. During the first years of his reign, his mother exercised the guardianship for him. She swore fealty to King Charles II of Naples, but after Charles II granted Achaea to Isabella of Villehardouin and her husband, Florent of Hainaut, she ignored the King's commands to render homage to them. In late 1291, she married Hugh of Brienne who held important fiefs in the Kingdom of Naples. Hugh asserted the regency for Guy and did not pay homage to the Achaean princes.

== Reign ==
Guy reached the age of majority in June 1294. Boniface of Verona knighted him at an assembly of the bishops and barons on 24 June. About two weeks later, Charles II appointed two deputies to receive Guy's homage. The King changed his mind before the end of July: he announced that Guy owed obedience to Isabella and Florent, because they were Guy's direct lords. Charles II also prohibited Guy's vassals to swear fealty to Guy before Guy rendered homage to the princes of Achaea.

Charles II made new arrangements when he ceded his claim to suzerainty over Achaea, Athens and other Balkan territories to his younger son, Philip I of Taranto on 13 August 1294. When listing both Achaea and Athens in his letter of grant to his son, the King implicitly acknowledged that Guy was to render homage directly to Philip. Isabella and Florent protested, but Hugh of Brienne swore fealty to Philip on Guy's behalf.

Guy's maternal uncles, Constantine Doukas and Theodore Angelos invaded their western neighbour, the Despotate of Epirus in the spring of 1295. Since the Epirote ruler, Thomas I Komnenos Doukas, was Philip of Taranto's brother-in-law, Charles II ordered Florent and Guy to launch a joint military campaign against Thessaly, but they could not prevent Constantine and Theodore from seizing Epirote lands. Hugh of Brienne was Guy's sound protector in Charles II's court, but he died unexpectedly on 9 August 1296. Isabella, who was staying in southern Italy, persuaded Charles II to again order Guy to swear fealty to her and her husband. The King threatened Guy with confiscating his duchy if he failed to obey his command on 1 October 1296. Guy's relationship with his mother also became tense and he seized parts of her dower. Philip of Taranto ordered Guy to return his mother's property to her, but he ignored Philip's orders.

Florent died in early 1297, and an influential Achaean lord, Nicholas III of Saint Omer, convinced the widowed Isabella to propose the hand of her only daughter, Mahaut, to Guy. The three-year-old Mahaut was sent to Athens, but Charles II protested against the marriage. On 3 July 1299, he reminded Guy that the heiress to Achaea could not marry without his consent, and ordered Guy to return her to her mother. Charles II also intervened in Guy's conflict with his mother, ordering him to restore her dower on 31 July. Isabella and Guy had already approached Pope Boniface VIII to sanction Guy's marriage, because Guy and his bride's mothers were cousins. The Pope granted the necessary dispensation on 9 August. Being the Pope's vassal, Charles II had to accept the Pope's decision and gave consent to the marriage on 20 April 1300. At Guy's request, the King had already forbidden Guy's mother to sell two towns which were part of her dowry without his consent.

Constantine Doukas and Theodore Angelos died in 1302 or 1303 and Constantine's minor son, John II Doukas, inherited Thessaly. Constantine had made Guy regent for John, and Guy appointed a Greek man named Boutomites to rule Thessaly. The Epirotes invaded Thessaly and captured the border castle of Phanari. Guy gathered the Athenian and Thessalian troops and also persuaded Nicholas III of Saint Omer to join the military campaign against Epirus. Their united armies marched as far as Kalambaka. Anna Palaiologina Kantakouzene, who ruled Epirus on behalf of her underage son, offered 7,000 hyperpyra to Guy and 3,000 hyperpyra to Saint Omer if they abandoned the campaign. Since she also promised to renounce Phanari, the Thessalian lords convinced Guy to accept her offer. However, Guy and Saint Omer did not dissolve the army, because the Thessalian lords persuaded them to invade the Byzantine territories in Macedonia instead. Shortly after their army crossed the frontier and the advance guard approached Thessaloniki, the Byzantine empress Eirene of Montferrat sent envoys to them and persuaded them to turn back without battle. The Empress wanted to seize Epirus and Thessaly and give them to her sons, John and Theodore, but Guy refused to make an alliance with her.

In 1307, Guy was made bailli of Achaea by its new prince, Philip I of Taranto. He governed well, but for barely a year, dying on 5 October 1308, at the age of 28. He was respected and renowned for his chivalry and manners, typical of the Frankish courts kept in Greece. He was buried in Daphni Monastery alongside his ancestors. He left no heirs and the De la Roche line of dukes came to an end; Athens was disputed among rival claimants until the parliament of the duchy elected Walter V of Brienne.

== Family ==
Ancestors of Guy II de la Roche

8. Pons of Flagney
4. Guy I, Lord of Athens
9. Bonne
2. William I, Duke of Athens
1. Guy II de la Roche
24. Michael I Komnenos Doukas
12. Michael II Komnenos Doukas
6. John I Doukas, Lord of Thessaly
3. Helena Angelina Komnene
14. Taronas, a Vlach chieftain
7. A daughter of Taronas

== Sources ==
- Lock, Peter (1995). The Franks in the Aegean, 1204–1500. Longman. ISBN 0-582-05140-1.
- Longnon, Jean (1969) [1962]. "The Frankish States in Greece, 1204–1311". In Setton, Kenneth M.; Wolff, Robert Lee; Hazard, Harry W. (eds.). A History of the Crusades, Volume II: The Later Crusades, 1189–1311. Vol. 2 (Second ed.). Madison, Milwaukee, and London: University of Wisconsin Press. pp. 234–275. ISBN 0-299-04844-6.
- Nicol, Donald M. (1984). The Despotate of Epiros 1267-1479: A Contribution to the History of Greece in the Middle Ages. Cambridge University Press. ISBN 978-0-521-13089-9.
- Perry, Guy (2018). The Briennes: The Rise and Fall of a Chempenois Dynasty in the Age of the Crusades, c. 950–1356. Cambridge University Press. ISBN 978-1-107-19690-2.
- Setton, Kenneth M. (1976). The Papacy and the Levant (1204–1571), Volume I: The Thirteenth and Fourteenth Centuries. Vol. 1. Philadelphia: The American Philosophical Society. ISBN 0-87169-114-0.

Preceded by Nicholas III of Saint Omer	Angevin bailli in the Principality of Achaea; 1307–1308	Succeeded by Bertin Visconte
Preceded by William I	Duke of Athens; 1287–1308	Succeeded by Walter
