= Giacomo Parravicini =

Italian painter

Giacomo Parravicini or Paravicini, also referred to as il Gianolo (5 June 1660 – 28 February 1729) was an Italian painter, active mainly in Milan and the Valtellina.

== Biography ==
He was born in Caspano, a neighborhood of Civo, in the province of Sondrio, in north Lombardy. He may have journeyed to Rome to study with Carlo Maratta, or more likely was influenced by Maratta's large school of pupils, including Giorgio Bonola, who worked together with Parravicini in painting for the church of Sant'Alessandro in Zebedia in Milan. Between 1687 and 1688, he painted for the choir and chapel of the archbishop's chapel in Caspano. He also painted for the parish church of Chiuro, and churches in Delebio, San Carlo and Traona. He painted some of the Quadroni of St. Charles, large canvases depicting episodes of the life of San Carlo Borromeo for the Milan Cathedral. He also painted in Crema and Bìumo Inferiore (Varese).
