= Albert Pallavicini =

Albert Pallavicini (Italian: Alberto Pallavicini) was the fifth marquess of Bodonitsa from his father's death until his own in 1311. His father was Thomas, a great-nephew of the first marquess, Guy. Albert married Maria dalle Carceri, a Venetian noblewoman from Euboea. He even obtained a sixth of that island.

He was a loyal vassal of the princes of Achaea. In 1305, he was summoned by his lord Philip of Savoy to a tournament and parliament on the Isthmus of Corinth. In 1307, he obeyed the similar summons of Philip I of Taranto. On 15 March 1311, he followed Walter V of Brienne into the Battle of the Cephissus, but did not emerge alive. By the Assizes of Romania, his fief was inherited by his widow and his daughter, Guglielma.

== Sources ==
- Miller, William (1908). "The Marquisate of Boudonitza (1204–1414)". Journal of Hellenic Studies. 28 (2): 234–249. doi:10.2307/624608. JSTOR 624608.
- Setton, Kenneth M.; Hazard, Harry W., eds. (1975). A History of the Crusades, Volume III: The Fourteenth and Fifteenth Centuries. Madison and London: University of Wisconsin Press. ISBN 0-299-06670-3.

Preceded by Thomas Pallavicini	Marquess of Bodonitsa c. 1300–1311	Succeeded by Maria dalle Carceri and Guglielma Pallavicini
