= Assizes of Romania =

Common law code of the states of Frankish Greece

The Assizes of Romania (French: Assises de Romanie), formally the Book of the Usages and Statutes of the Empire of Romania (Venetian: Libro de le Uxanze e Statuti de lo Imperio de Romania), is a collection of laws compiled in the Principality of Achaea that became the common law code of the states of Frankish Greece in the 13th–15th centuries, and continued in occasional use in the Venetian Ionian Islands until the 18th century.

== History ==
The compilation comprises a prologue and 219 clauses. The traditional story of the law code's origin, recounted in the prologue, is that the first Latin Emperor, Baldwin I, based it on the Assizes of Jerusalem, but this is disputed. The present collection was actually compiled in the Frankish Morea (the Principality of Achaea) between 1333 and 1346 and is based on a variety of legal traditions. The Assizes of Jerusalem were used in so far as, in the words of medievalist David Jacoby, "[there] the Latins faced political and military circumstances similar to those of the Morea, and existed in a virtual state of perpetual war", but the Moreote collection incorporates also feudal customs imported by the Crusaders directly from Western Europe, legislation from France and Angevin Naples, Byzantine law in matters of inheritance and agricultural law (especially as regards the serfs or paroikoi), as well as laws and court decisions from the Latin Empire and the Principality of Achaea.

Due to the political pre-eminence of Achaea, the Assizes were adopted across most of Frankish Greece, and survived longest in the Venetian colonies in the Ionian Islands, where they were occasionally consulted until the dissolution of the Venetian Republic by Napoleon in 1797. Indeed, the Assizes only survive in Venetian translations dating from 1423 to the mid-18th century.

== Editions ==
The various manuscripts of the Assizes were first published by Paolo Canciani in 1785:

- Canciani, Paolo, ed. (1785). Liber Consuetudinum imperii Romaniae, in Venetorum et Francorum ditionem redacti, concinnatus in usum Principatus Achajae a Serenissima Republica Veneta. Barbarorum leges antiquae. Vol. III. Venice. pp. 495–534.

There also exist three critical editions with French, English, and Italian translations respectively:

- Recoura, Georges, ed. (1930). Les Assises de Romanie: éd. critique avec une introd. et des notes. Paris: H. Champion. OCLC 2365468.
- Topping, Peter W., ed. (1949). Feudal Institutions as Revealed in the Assizes of Romania: The Law Code of Frankish Greece; Translation of the Text of the Assizes with a Commentary on Feudal Institutions in Greece and Medieval Europe. Philadelphia: University of Pennsylvania Press. OCLC 302644.
- Parmeggiani, Antonella, ed. (1998). Libro dele Uxanze e statuti delo imperio de Romania. Spoleto: Centro italiano di studi sull'alto Medioevo. ISBN 9788879881401. OCLC 42616986.

== See also ==
- Assizes of Jerusalem

== Sources ==
- Bon, Antoine (1969). La Morée franque. Recherches historiques, topographiques et archéologiques sur la principauté d'Achaïe [The Frankish Morea. Historical, Topographic and Archaeological Studies on the Principality of Achaea] (in French). Paris: De Boccard. OCLC 869621129.
- Jacoby, David (1971). La féodalité en Grèce médiévale: Les "Assises de Romanie", sources, application et diffusion (in French). Paris & The Hague: Mouton & Co. LCCN 70-150569.
- Jacoby, David (1989). "Social Evolution in Latin Greece". In Setton, Kenneth M.; Hazard, Harry W.; Zacour, Norman P. (eds.). A History of the Crusades, Volume VI: The Impact of the Crusades on Europe. Vol. 6. Madison and London: University of Wisconsin Press. pp. 175–221. ISBN 0-299-10740-X.
- Setton, Kenneth M. (1976). The Papacy and the Levant (1204–1571), Volume I: The Thirteenth and Fourteenth Centuries. Vol. 1. Philadelphia: The American Philosophical Society. ISBN 0-87169-114-0.
