= Guy I de la Roche =

13th-century Duke of Athens

Coat of arms of Guy I

Guy I de la Roche (1205–1263) was the Duke of Athens (from 1225/34), the son and successor of the first duke Othon. After the conquest of Thebes, Othon gave half the city in lordship to Guy.

== Life ==
Guy's early life is obscure. Since the 18th century, historians assumed Guy to have been a nephew of the first duke of Athens, Othon de la Roche, but a charter from 1251, published by J. Longnon in 1973, establishes him as Othon's son. It is unknown when he succeeded to the duchy; Othon is last mentioned in 1225, and was certainly dead by 1234. Earlier scholars, following J.A. Buchon and Karl Hopf, supposed that Othon returned to his native Burgundy after 1225, whereupon Guy inherited from him in Greece; as J. Longnon pointed out, although this might be possible, there is no evidence for it. The charter indicates that initially, Guy inherited the duchy and some lands in France, but not Othon's other Greek possession. The lordship of Argos and Nauplia in the Principality of Achaea passed to Guy's brother Othon, lord of Ray, who kept it until 1251, when Guy purchased it from him for 15,000 hyperpyra and in exchange for his own lands and claims in France.

Guy also owned the whole of Thebes, for which along with Argos he owed homage to the prince of Achaea. Athens itself was independent of any other sovereign than the Latin emperor after the fall of the Kingdom of Thessalonica in 1224. The duchy was prospering at the time due to its silk industry (centred at Thebes) and its trade with Venice and Genoa. In 1240, Guy gave out half of the lordship of Thebes to Bela of St. Omer, the husband of his sister Bonne.

When Prince William II of Achaea disputed the suzerainty over the island of Euboea with the Venetians and the local triarchs, Guy supported the latter. In the spring of 1258, William marched on Thebes and defeated Guy in a hard-fought battle at the foot of Mount Karydi. Guy was subsequently besieged in Thebes and forced to surrender. He did homage at Nikli, but the barons of the realm, not being his peers, sent him for judgment to France. He left in the spring of 1259. The court of France found Guy not liable for liege homage and thus unable to be deprived of his fief. His journey was to be his punishment. The Chronicle of Morea asserts that Athens, which was technically only a lordship, was officially raised to the status of a duchy only after Guy met with King Louis IX of France sometime in 1260. In Spring that year, Guy set out to return to Greece, receiving news on the way that William II had been defeated by Emperor Michael VIII Palaeologus at the Battle of Pelagonia and taken prisoner. Soon after his arrival, news reached him of the fall of Constantinople to the Byzantines.

Guy served as the administrator of Achaea while William II was held prisoner by Michael VIII.

Guy survived these serious ruptures to the Frankish states in Greece until his death in 1263 and was succeeded by his son John I.

== Family ==
Guy married a niece of the William II of Villehardouin whose name does not survive. She hailed either from Champagne or Burgundy and arrived in Frankish Greece at the invitation of her uncle, who sought to strengthen familial ties through alliances with other contemporary lords. The couple had the following children:

- John, Duke of Athens (died 1280), succeeded his father as duke in 1263, unmarried and childless
- William (died 1287), duke of Athens, married Helena Angelina Komnene, by whom he had one son, Guy II
- Alice (died 1282), regent of Beirut, married John II of Beirut
- Marguerite (died after 1293), married Count Henry I of Vaudémont
- Isabella (died before 1291), married first Geoffrey of Briel, lord of Karytaina, and then Hugh of Brienne, count of Brienne and Lecce
- Catherine, married Carlo di Lagonessa, Seneschal of Sicily

It is notable that many of her children's names are commonly found in the genealogical tree of the Villehardouin family, such as the female names Ysabeau, Alix, Marguerite, and Katherine. Most significantly, however, is the name Guillaume, with which she may have baptized her son in honour of her uncle, the Prince of Achaea.

== Notes ==
Preceded by Othon de la Roche	Duke of Athens; 1225/34–1263	Succeeded by John I de la Roche
Preceded by Othon V de la Roche	Lord of Argos and Nauplia; 1251–1263	Succeeded by John I de la Roche
