= William Miller (historian) =

British medievalist and journalist (1864–1945)

- Born: 8 December 1864; Wigton, United Kingdom
- Died: 23 October 1945 (aged 80); Durban, South Africa
- Occupation: Medievalist

William Miller, FBA (8 December 1864 – 23 October 1945) was a British-born medievalist and journalist.

== Biography ==
The son of a Cumberland mine owner, Miller was educated at Rugby School and Hertford College, Oxford, where he gained a double first, and was called to the bar in 1889, but never practised law. He married Ada Mary Wright in 1895, and in 1896 published The Balkans, followed in 1898 by Travels and Politics in the Near East.

In 1903 he and his wife left England for Italy, and despite an effort by Ronald Burrows to recruit Miller as the first incumbent of the Chair of Modern Greek and Byzantine History, Language, and Literature at London University, he and his wife spent the rest of their lives abroad. They lived in Rome (at Via Palestro 36) until 1923, when Miller found Benito Mussolini's rise to power distasteful, and they moved to Athens. There he was associated with the British School at Athens until the German invasion of Greece in 1941. During his time in Rome and Athens, Miller also served as correspondent of the Morning Post.

Together the couple lived in the Ocean View Hotel in Durban, South Africa, for the rest of their lives. Miller died there in 1945, while Ada Mary surviving him by five years. They had no children.

Miller was a fellow of the British Academy and foreign corresponding member of Academy of Athens.

== Works ==
Miller was particularly interested in the Frankish period of Greek history, covering the Crusader principalities established on Greek soil following the Fourth Crusade. He was among the most eminent scholars of the field in the early 20th century, and produced a number of "landmark" studies.

Although his work displays a "romantic view of the Crusades and the Frankish expansion into the Eastern Mediterranean" typical of 19th-century Western trends on the subject, and is considered "clearly outdated" given the research produced in recent decades, it has had a major influence and remains widely used to this day. Particularly the 1908 The Latins in the Levant has "remained for decades the standard English-language narrative account of the period", and is "still the main reference for undergraduates in search of information on medieval Greece". Its influence has also been felt in Greece, where already in 1909–1910 the Greek scholar Spyridon Lambros issued an expanded Greek translation of the work.

== Selected bibliography ==
- The Balkans: Roumania, Bulgaria, Servia, and Montenegro. New York and London: G. P. Putnam's Sons and T. Fisher Unwin. 1896 – via Internet Archive.
- Travels and Politics in the Near East. London: T. Fisher Unwin. 1898 – via Internet Archive.
- Mediaeval Rome, from Hildebrand to Clement VIII, 1073—1600. Story of the nations. New York: G. P. Putnam's Sons. 1902. ISBN 978-07-90-56244-5.
- Greek Life in Town and Country. London: George Newnes, Limited. 1905 – via Internet Archive.
- The Latins in the Levant. London: John Murray. 1908 – via Internet Archive.
- The Ottoman Empire and its Successors, 1801-1922 (2nd ed.). Cambridge: At the University Press. 1923 – via Internet Archive., (4th ed), 1936
- Essays on the Latin Orient. Cambridge: At the University Press. 1921 – via Internet Archive.
- History of the Greek People (1821-1921); with an Introduction by G. P. Gooch. London: Methuen and Co. Ltd. 1922 – via Internet Archive.
- Miller, William (1920). "The Ottoman Empire and the Balkan Peninsula". In Lord Acton; Ward, A. W.; Prothero, G. W.; Leathes, Stanley M. (eds.). The Cambridge Modern History. Vol. XII. The Latest Age. Cambridge: Cambridge University Press. pp. 381–428.
- Miller, William (1923). "XV: Greece and Aegean under Frank and Venetian Domination (1204—1571)". In Bury, J.B. (ed.). Cambridge Medieval History. Vol. IV: Eastern Roman Empire, 717–1453. Cambridge: Cambridge University Press. pp. 432–477.
- Miller, William (1923). "XVI. The Empire of Nicaea and the Recovery of Constantinople". In Bury, J.B. (ed.). Cambridge Medieval History. Vol. IV: Eastern Roman Empire, 717–1453. Cambridge: Cambridge University Press. pp. 478–516.
- Miller, William (1923). "XVII. The Balkan States". In Bury, J.B. (ed.). Cambridge Medieval History. Vol. IV: Eastern Roman Empire, 717–1453. Cambridge: Cambridge University Press. pp. 517–593.
- Empire of Trebizond, the Last Greek Empire. London: Society for Promoting Christian Knowledge. 1926. hdl:2027/mdp.39015019216228.
- Greece (UK ed.). London: Ernest Benn:LTD. 1928.
  Published in USA by C. Scribner’s Sons from name «Ottoman Empire and Greece»

== Sources ==
- Hetherington, Paul (2009). "William Miller: Medieval historian and modern journalist". British School at Athens Studies. 17: 153–161. JSTOR 40960680.
- Lock, Peter (2013) [1995]. The Franks in the Aegean, 1204–1500. New York and London: Routledge. ISBN 978-0-582-05139-3.
- Tsougarakis, Nickiphoros (2014). "The Latins in Greece: A Brief Introduction". In Tsougarakis, Nickiphoros I.; Lock, Peter (eds.). A Companion to Latin Greece. Brill's Companions to European History. Leiden and New York: Brill Publishers. pp. 1–22. ISBN 978-90-04-28410-4.
