= Palazzo Pallavicini =

Palazzo Pallavicini is the name of several Italian palaces, including:

- Palazzo Cambiaso Pallavicini, Genoa
- Palazzo Carrega-Cataldi, also known as Palazzo Tobia Pallavicino, Genoa
- Palazzo Cipriano Pallavicini, Genoa
- Palazzo Cosmo Centurione, also known as Palazzo Durazzo Pallavicini, Genoa
- Palazzo Durazzo-Pallavicini, Genoa
- Palazzo Interiano Pallavicini, Genoa
- Palazzo Pallavicini at Via San Felice, Bologna
- Palazzo Pallavicini-Rospigliosi, Rome
- Palazzo Rospigliosi a Via del Duca, also known as Palazzo Rospigliosi-Pallavicini, Pistoia

== See also ==
- Pallavicini family
- Palais Pallavicini, Vienna
- Villa Pallavicini
