= Palais Pallavicini =

Palace in Vienna, Austria

Coordinates: 48°12′24″N 16°22′02″E

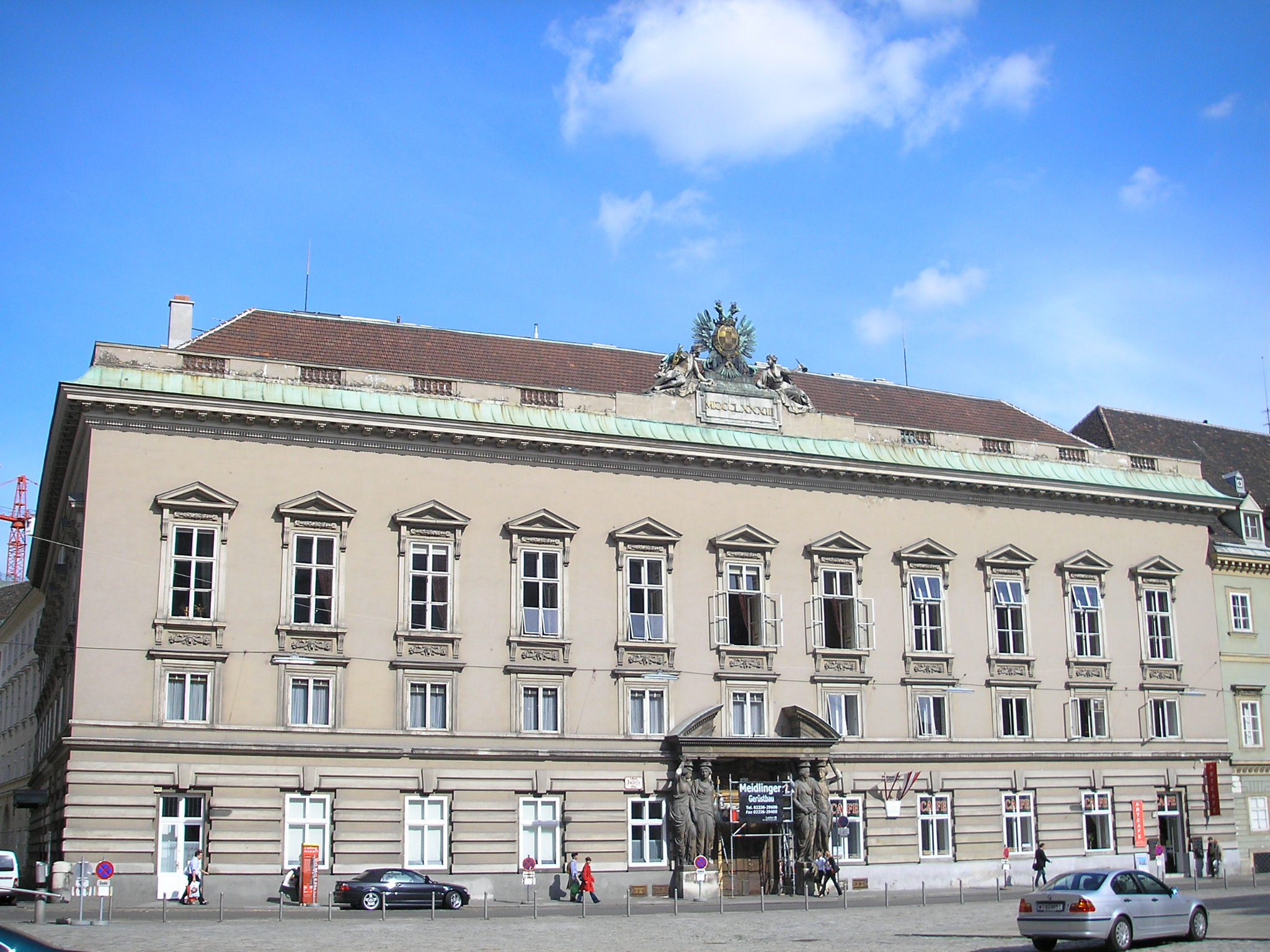
The front of Palais Pallavicini

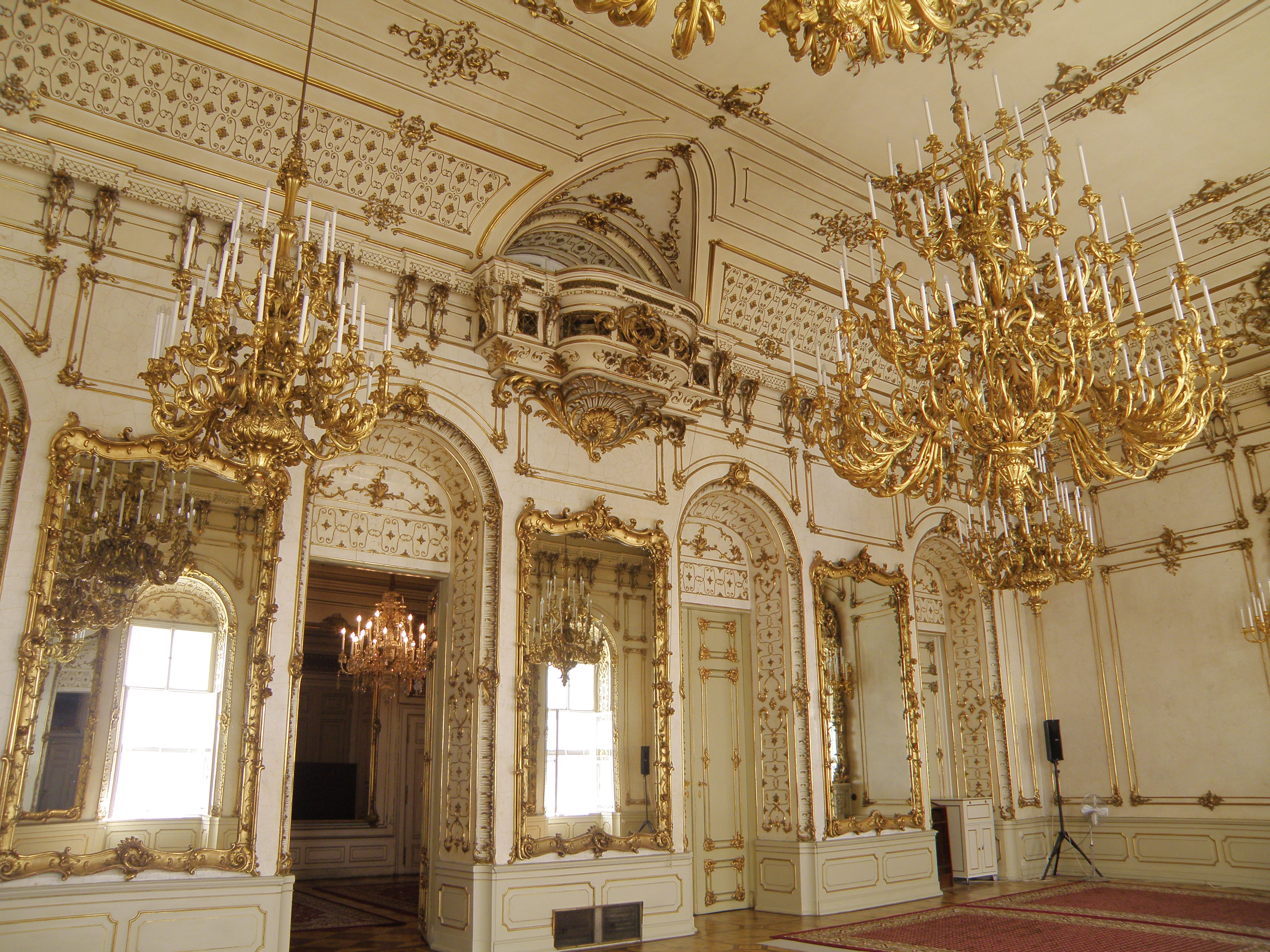
The ballroom in the palace

Palais Pallavicini is a palace in Vienna, Austria. It is located in the Josefsplatz square at number 5. It has been owned by the noble Pallavicini family. It was previously built and owned by the Fries banking family (Swiss-Austrian) and is therefore also known as Palais Fries as house of Count Johann von Fries (and later of his son Count Moritz von Fries that sold it). It was built upon a monastery, erected by Elisabeth of Austria, Queen of France (widow of King Charles IX of France), closed in 1782 (the former monastic church is now the Lutheran City Church).

== History ==
The palace was constructed in 1784 by Johann Ferdinand Hetzendorf von Hohenberg in a Neoclassical style. The interior rooms are richly gilded and decorated with stucco, crystal chandeliers and mirrors. The elaborately-inlaid parquet floors are made out of expensive woods.

The Palais Pallavicini is still family-owned, and the historic rooms have been restored. The palace can be rented for special occasions, including conferences, concerts, wedding receptions and other events.

== Popular culture ==
The Palais Pallavicini was used in the 1949 film, The Third Man, as the location for Harry Lime's apartment. It was also used in the 2013 film The Best Offer as the location of Virgil Oldman's apartment.

== See also ==
- Palazzo Pallavicini, several buildings
- Villa Pallavicini, several buildings
