= Palazzo Cipriano Pallavicini =

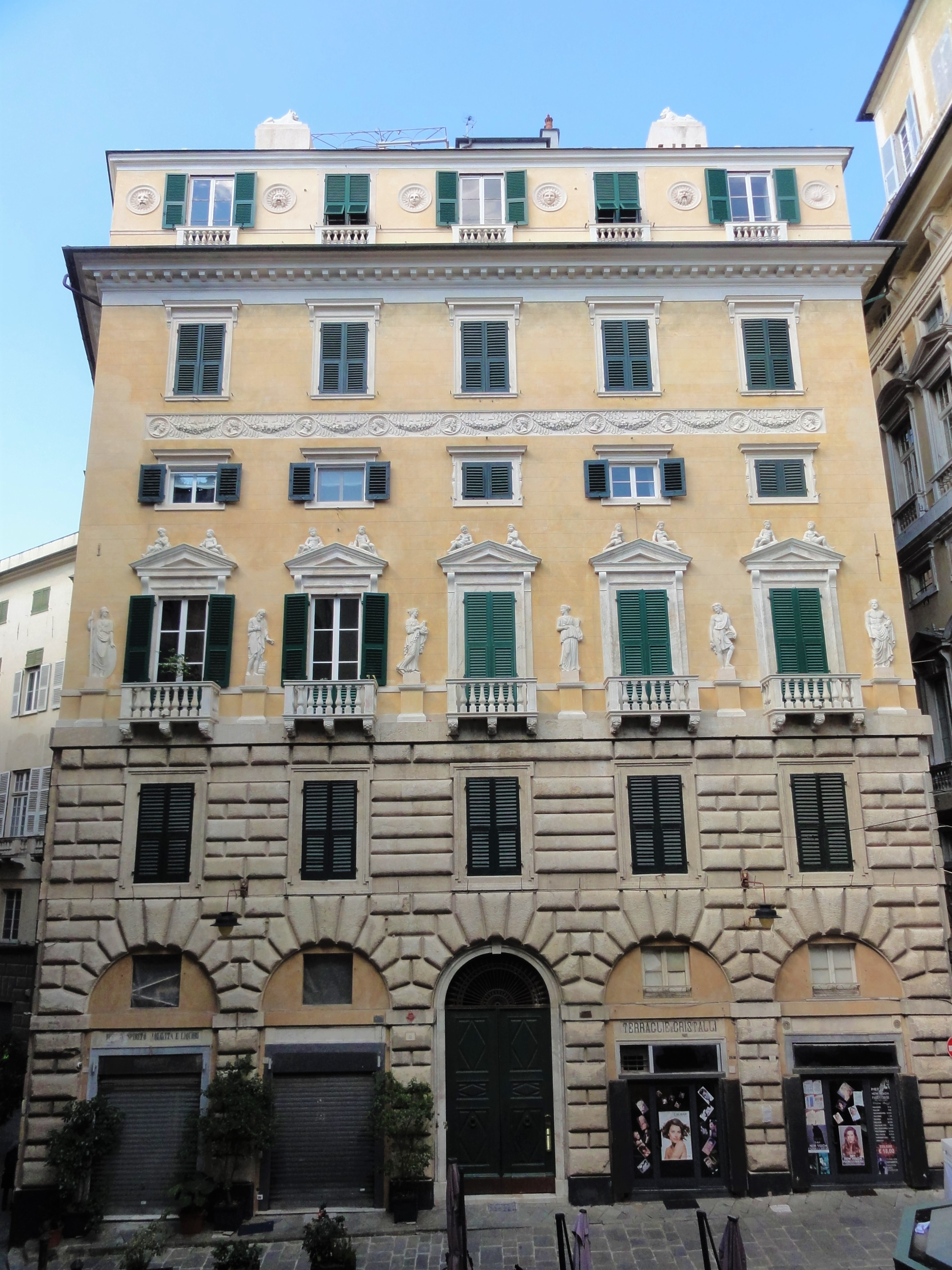
- Facade of the Palazzo Cipriano Pallavicini in Piazza Fossatello 2
- Interactive map of the Palazzo Cipriano Pallavicini area
- Alternative names: Palazzo Pallavicini

General information
- Status: In use
- Type: Palace
- Architectural style: Mannerist
- Location: Genoa, Italy, 2, Piazza Fossatello
- Coordinates: 44.412006°N 8.929094°E
- Construction started: 14-15th century; reconstruction 1540; 1840
- Completed: 16th century

UNESCO World Heritage Site
- Part of: Genoa: Le Strade Nuove and the system of the Palazzi dei Rolli
- Criteria: Cultural: (ii)(iv)
- Reference: 1211
- Inscription: 2006 (30th Session)

The palazzo Cipriano Pallavicini is a building located in the historical centre of Genoa in Piazza Fossatello at number 2, which is one of the 42 palaces included in the site called Le Strade Nuove e il Sistema dei Palazzi dei Rolli di Genova that became part of the UNESCO World Heritage UNESCO World Heritage on 13 July 2006.

== History and description ==
On the site of the present building, a construction for residential use had been erected, starting in the 15th century, consisting, according to medieval tradition, of two buildings side by side with underlying water cisterns and workshops. The building stood at a crossroads, which in 1539 was to be transformed into a piazza by demolishing the surrounding hovels, at which time Cipriano Pallavicini, (elected in 1567 archbishop of Genoa) with his brothers Antoniotto and Gerolamo commissioned an author who has remained anonymous to design a new façade with a more modern façade and a design inspired by the Roman Palazzo Caprini by Donato Bramante.

In 1571 the palace was sold to Antonio Brignole but in 1584 it returned to the ownership of the Pallavicino family in the person of Francesco Pallavicini, holder of the first inscription to the rolli dating back to 1599, the building also remained in the following rollo of the year 1614.

In the following centuries, ownership passed to the Grillo (family) (1713), to the Saporiti family (1718) and finally in 1840 to Federico Rayper from Ticino, supplier to the Navy of the Kingdom of Sardinia and father of the painter Ernesto Rayper, who asked permission to raise the building by two storeys and carry out an invasive general renovation during which almost the entire shell was emptied, the result being a building divided into flats, with decoration in the neoclassical fashion.

All that remains of the Carlone family's great portal, preserved for more than a century at the Victoria and Albert Museum in London and the Rubensian engravings.

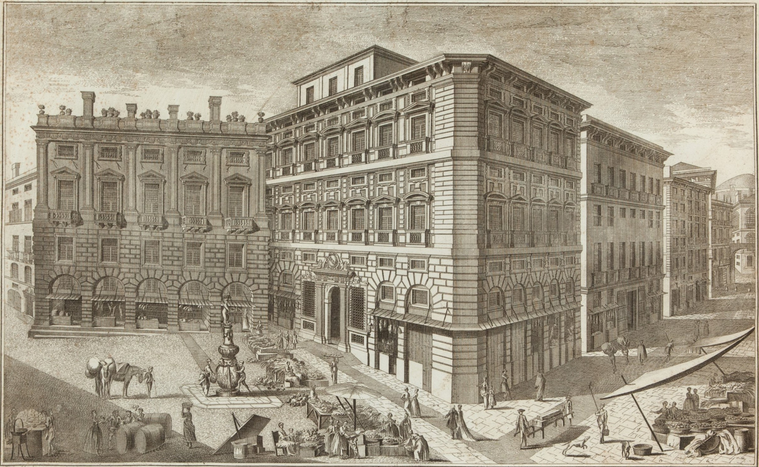
Veduta della piazza di Fossatello, etching by Antonio Giolfi, 1796

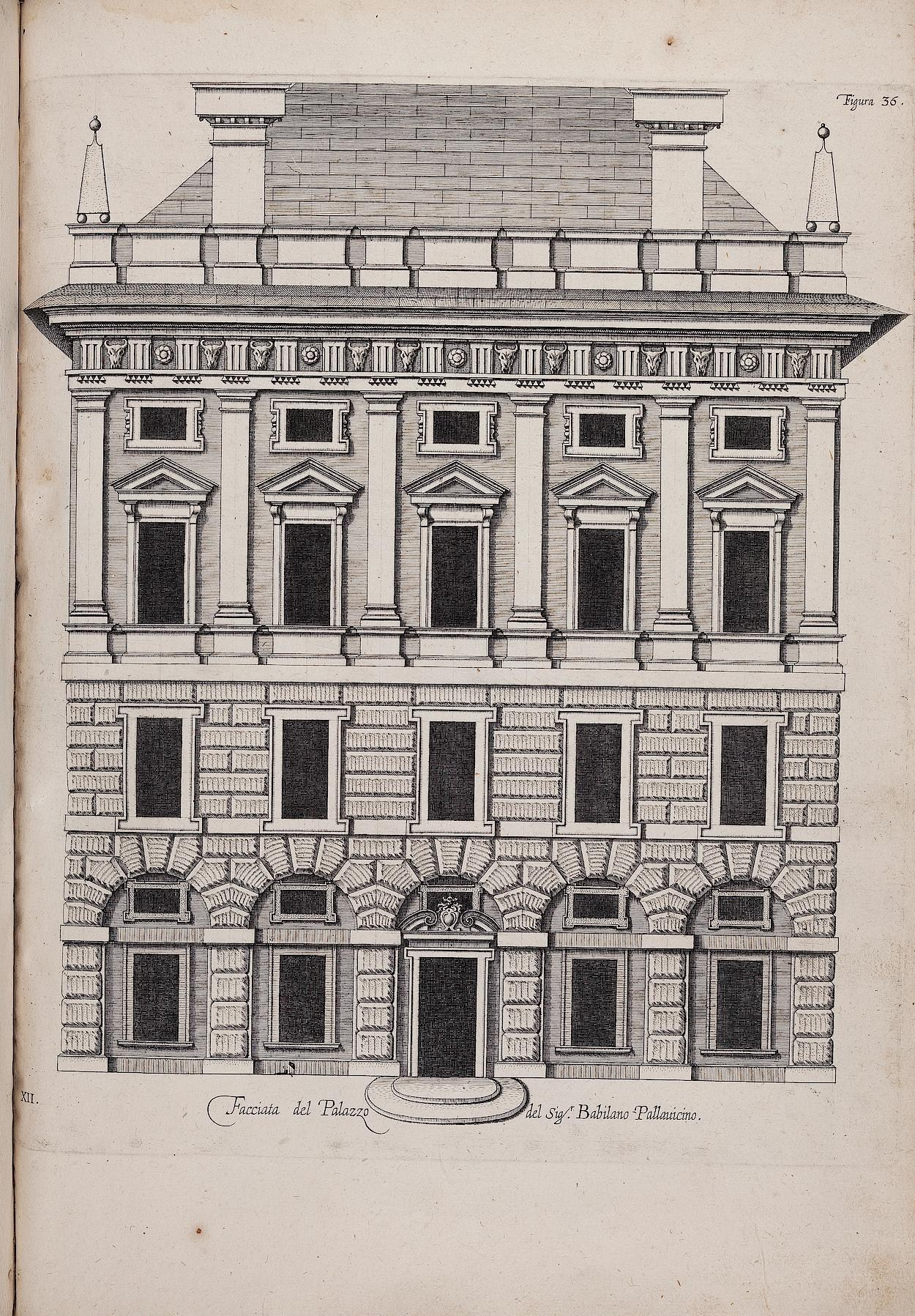
Rubens, Palazzi di Genova (1622)

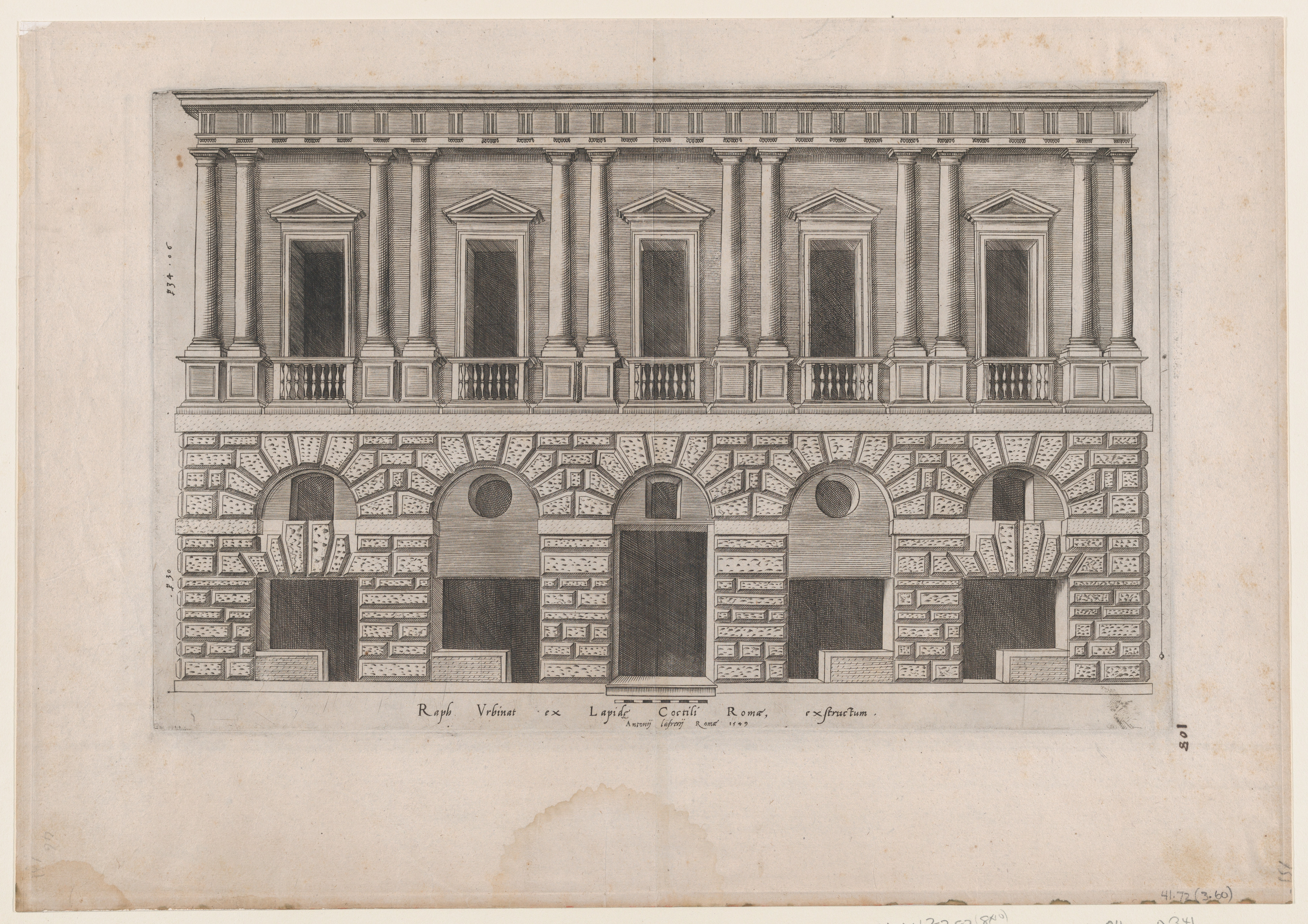
Palazzo Caprini in the engraving by Antoine Lafréry

== Bibliography ==
=== Italian sources ===
- Ennio Poleggi (1998). Una reggia repubblicana. Atlante dei palazzi di Genova 1576-1664. Torino: Umebrto Allimandi e C.
- Ennio Poleggi (2002). Genova, una civiltà di palazzi. Cinisello Balsamo: Silvana Editoriale.
- Clara Altavista, Un esempio eccezionale di architettura all'antica a Genova: il palazzo del cardinale Cipriano Pallavicino in piazza Fossatello (1540-44), in Annali di Architettura nº 20, Vicenza 2008
