= Palazzo Interiano Pallavicini =

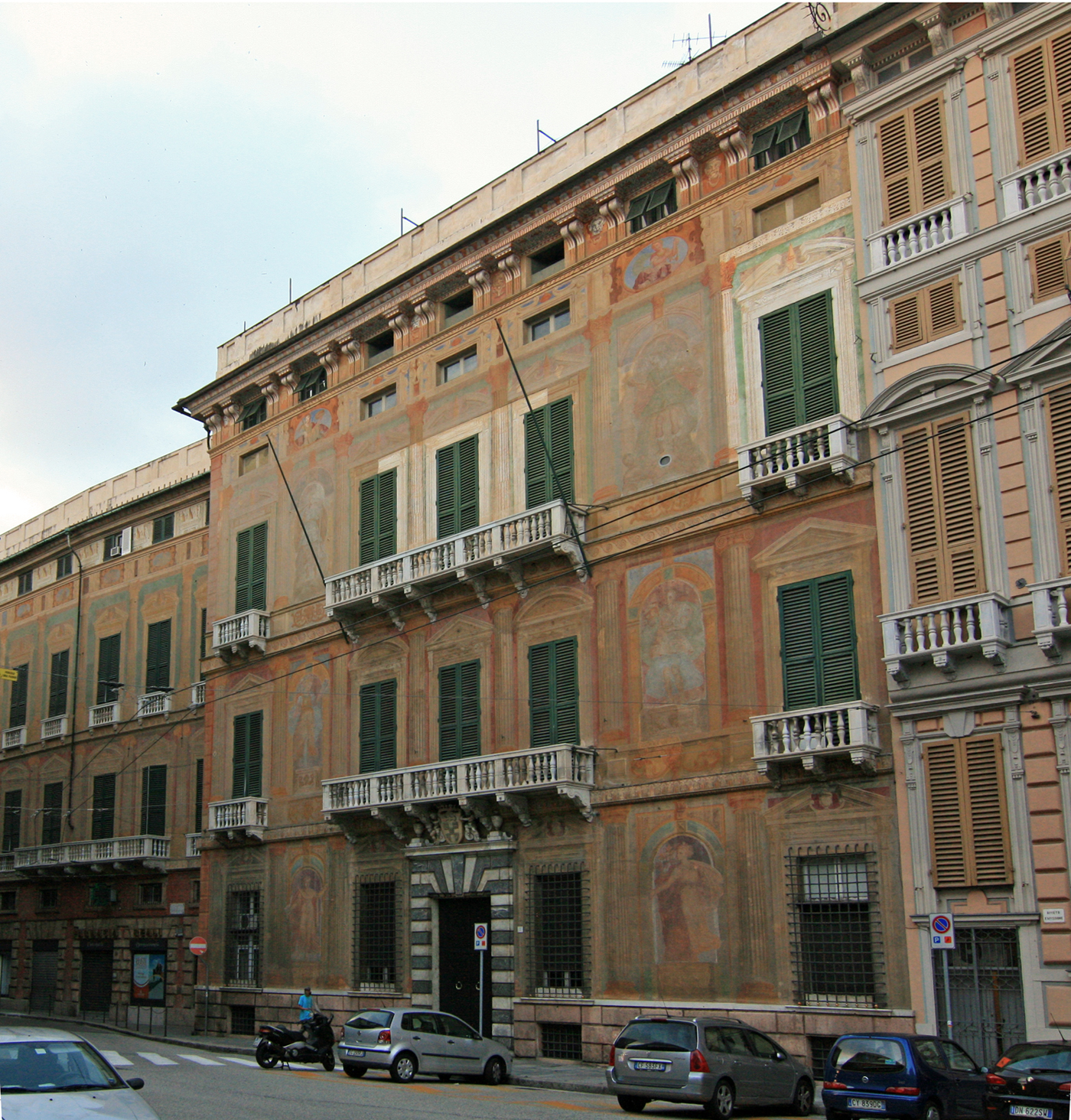
- Facade of the Interiano Pallavicini in Piazza delle Fontane Marose, 2
- Interactive map of the Palazzo Interiano Pallavicini area
- Alternative names: Palazzo Paolo Battista e Niccolò Interiano

General information
- Status: private home
- Type: Palace
- Architectural style: Mannerist
- Location: Genoa, Italy, 2 Piazza delle Fontane Marose
- Coordinates: 44.410536°N 8.935097°E
- Construction started: 1565
- Completed: 1567

Design and construction
- Architects: Francesco Casella; Pietro Pellegrini

UNESCO World Heritage Site
- Part of: Genoa: Le Strade Nuove and the system of the Palazzi dei Rolli
- Criteria: Cultural: (ii)(iv)
- Reference: 1211
- Inscription: 2006 (30th Session)

The palazzo Paolo e Niccolò Interiano, or palazzo Interiano Pallavicino, is a building located in Piazza delle Fontane Marose at number 2 in Genoa, included on 13 July 2006 in the list of the 42 palaces inscribed in the Rolli di Genova that have become World Heritage by UNESCO.

== History ==
It was built by the Ticino architect Francesco Casella for Paolo Battista and Niccolò Interiano between 1565 and 1567. It appears as a palace of the highest category in the rolls of 1576, 1599, 1614. It was included by Rubens in his edition of Palaces of Genoa of 1622.

Around 1664, it became the property of Gio.Batta Negrone; it was then owned by the Centurione, then Grimaldi (1797) and Vivaldi Pasqua, who extensively restored the palace, extending it northwards by Pietro Pellegrini between 1844 and 1851, and finally Pallavicini.

== Description ==
=== Exterior ===
It presents a façade that is difficult to read with an architectural square with niches and figures (allegories of Prudence, Temperance, Justice and Fortitude and of the cardinal virtues painted by Mannerist painters Lazzaro and Benedetto Calvi between the XVI and 17th century), as well as on the rear elevation. The portal, in alternating stone and marble, with putti and vases, is surmounted by the coat of arms of the Pallavicino family.

On the left side of the palace, three epigraphs of the Fathers of the Commune (1206, 1427, 1559) remain as evidence of the Amorose or Marose fountains, demolished with the opening of Via G. Interiano, which still give their name to the adjacent square.

Still on the roof there is a garden, a 19th-century work by architect Pietro Pellegrini, consisting of a series of consecutive terraces climbing gradually up the hill, with some loggias, a nymphaeum, as well as some statues and basins by Traverso and Parodi. Towards the top, the park, still planted with trees, is scenographically concluded by an open gallery above which stands the modern building of the Museo d'arte orientale Edoardo Chiossone, built by Mario Labò in 1971 to replace the destroyed Villetta Di Negro.

=== Interior ===
In the atrium, the frescoes are by Giovanni Battista Carlone, while the neoclassical statue of Antinoo is by Nicolò Traverso, and those of Paride and Elena, by Salvatore Revelli, 19th century.

In the 19th century, commissioned by Marquis Domenico Pallavicino and his wife Teresa Corsi, the facades were restored and the interior decoration of numerous rooms was carried out. Michele Canzio decorated a hall with Scenes from the Old Testament.

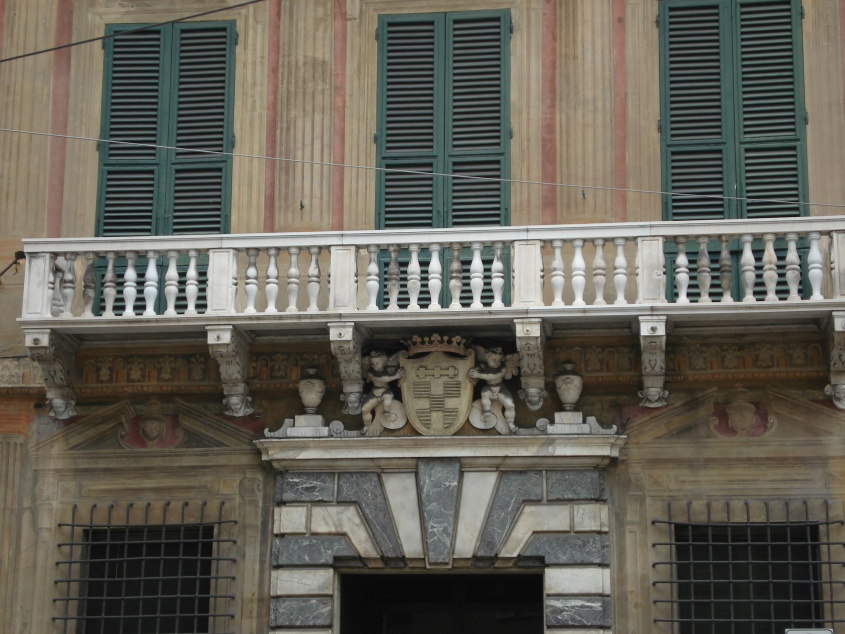
Particular of the portal

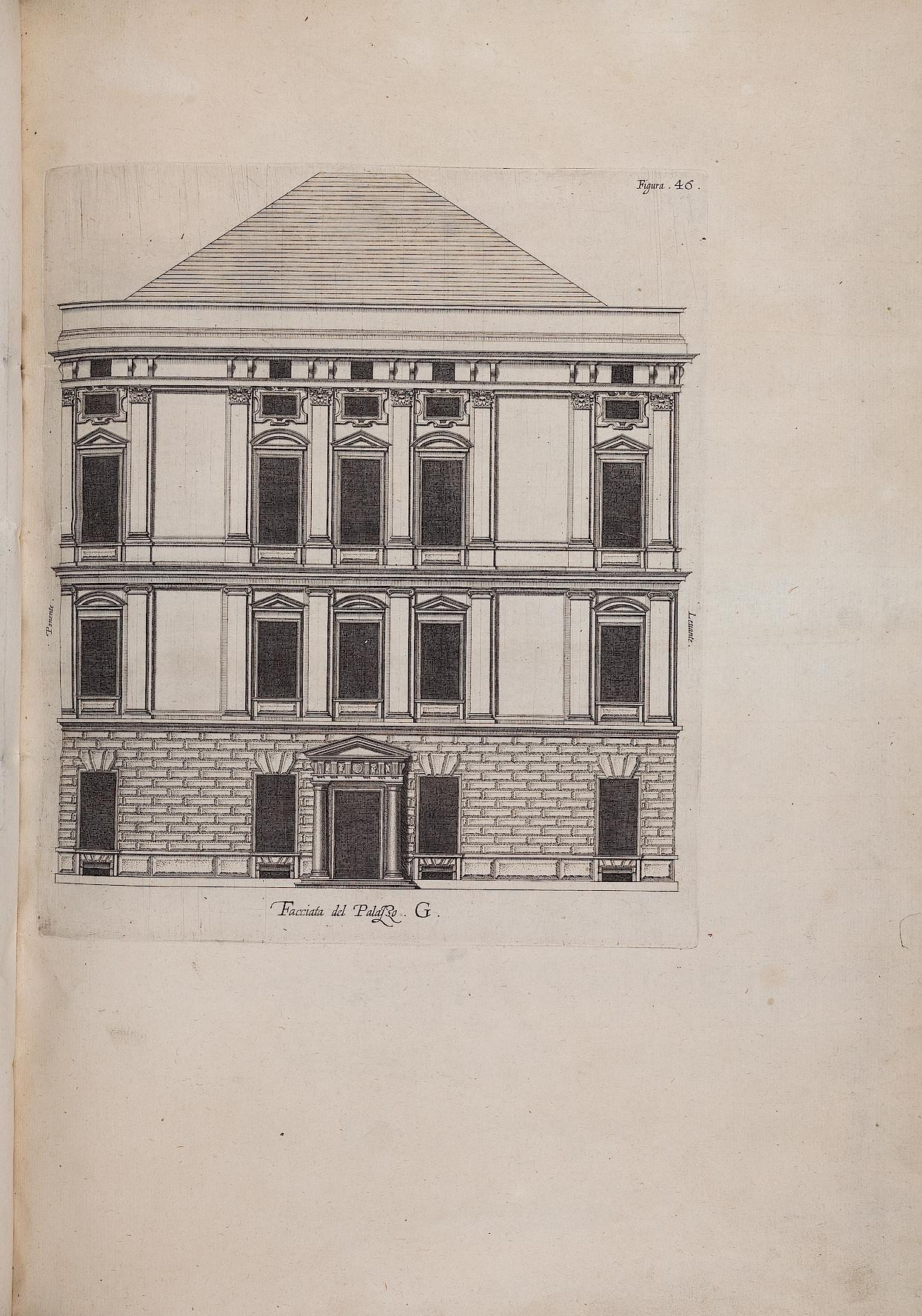
Rubens, - Palazzi di Genova, Interiano Palace

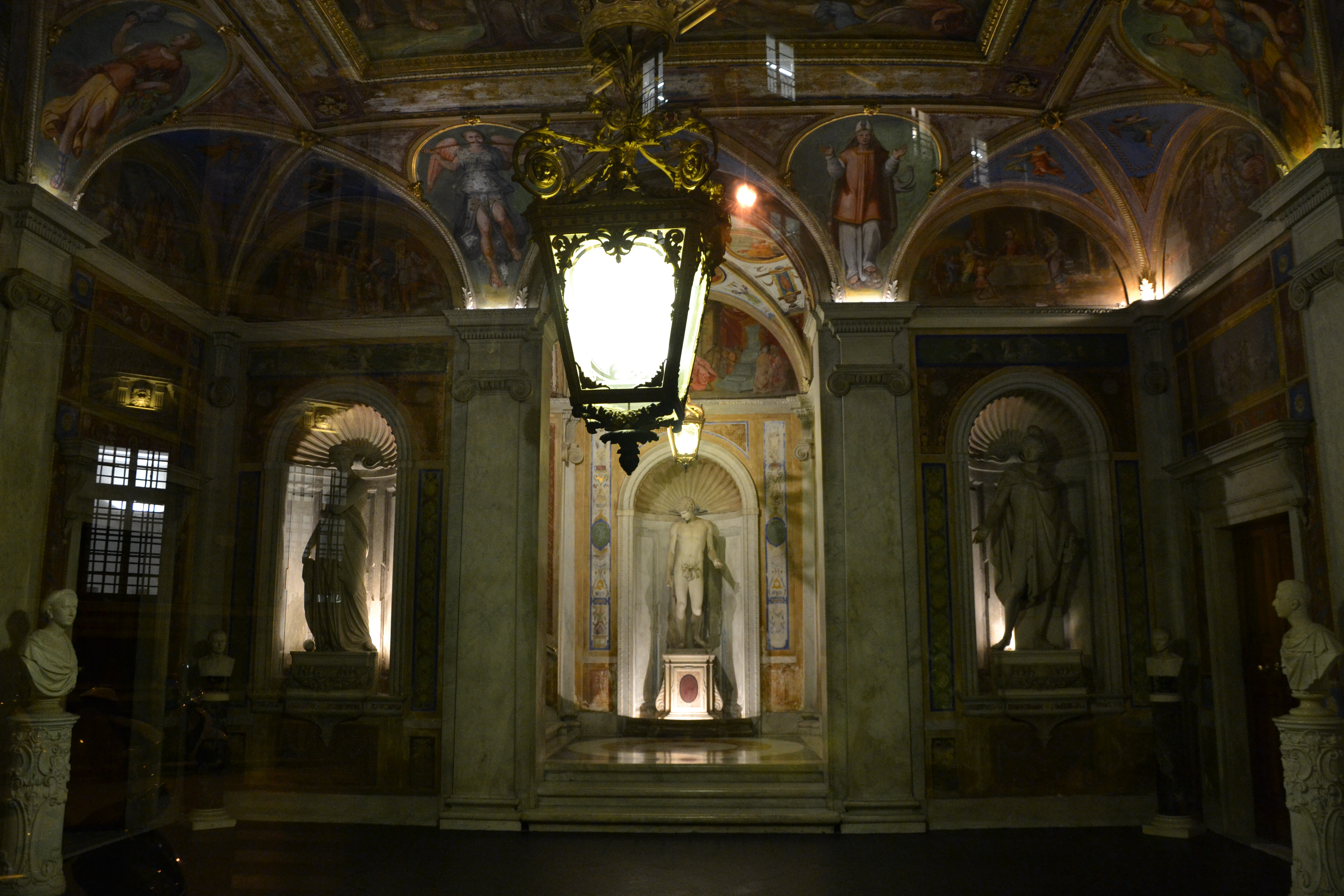
Atrium

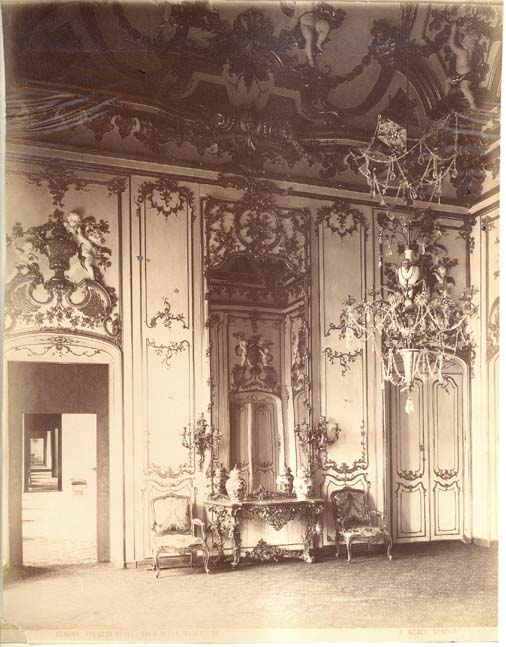
Noack, Alfred (1833–1895) - Interior of Palazzo Pallavicino

== Sources ==
=== Italian sources ===
- P. Boccardo, A. Orlando, Palazzo Interiano Pallavicino a Genova, Genova 2004
- G. Bozzo, A. Brena, G. Gioia, S. Lanini, Palazzo Interiano Pallavicino, in “Arkos”, supplemento al n. 7/2004 “Il restauro dei palazzi dei Rolli”, pp. 118–121.
