= Palazzo Durazzo-Pallavicini =

Italian palace in Genoa

Coordinates: 44.4146°N 8.9273°E

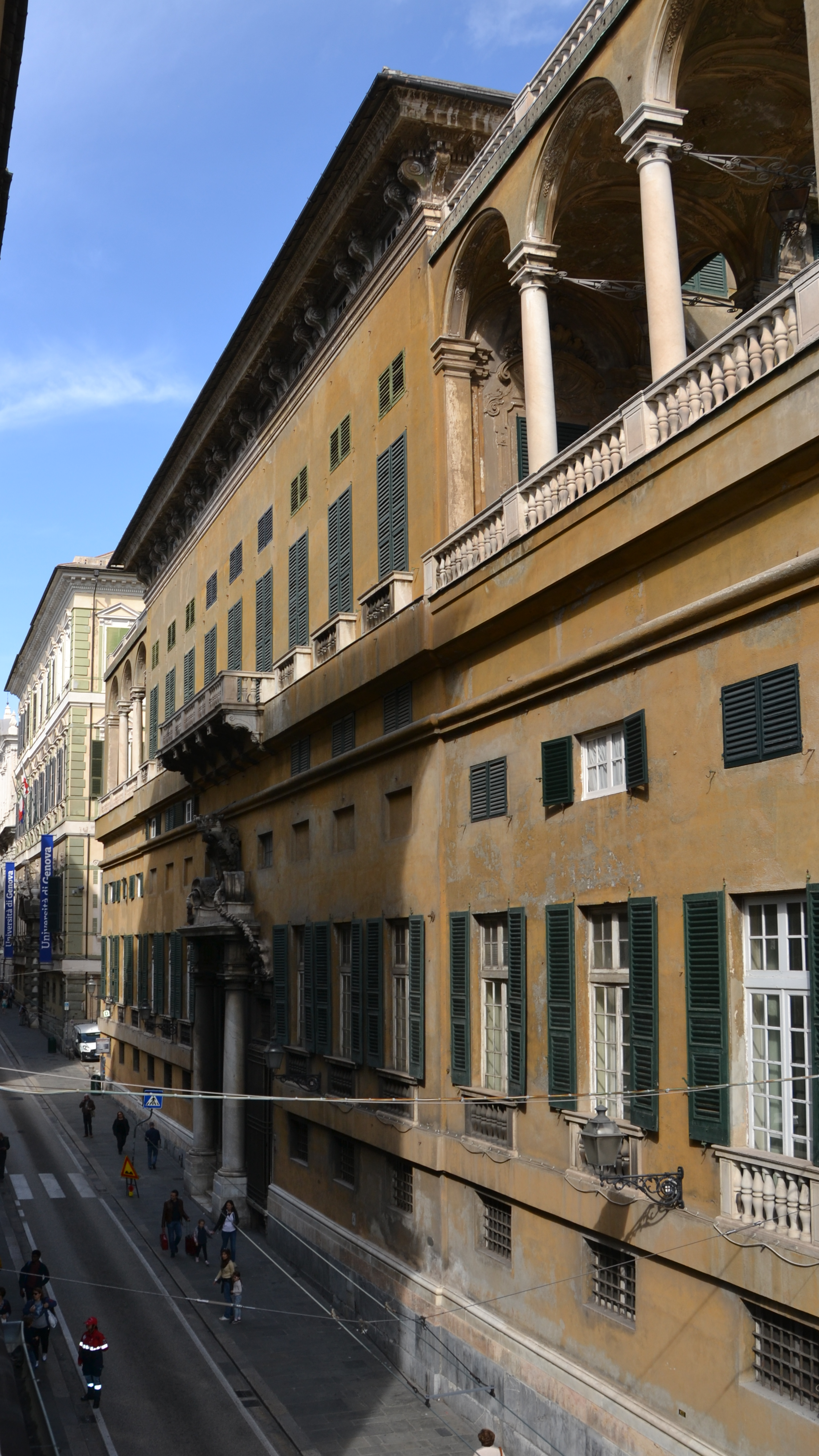
View of the Palazzo

Palazzo Durazzo-Pallavicini or Palazzo di Gio Agostino Balbi is a building on Via Balbi in the historic city centre of Genoa, included on 13 July 2006 in the list of the 42 palaces inscribed in the Rolli di Genova that became World Heritage by UNESCO on that date.

== History ==
Its architecture is thought of as being the link between the residential models of Strada Nuova and the compositional solutions of Via Balbi. It was designed by Bartolomeo Bianco for Gio. Agostino Balbi early in the 17th century, ably meeting the client's request for a traditional U-shaped floor plan despite the triangular plot of land available. A strong architectural element of the design is the nucleus of the diverging stairs on the courtyard, separated by a monumental staircase: a real path covered by the rooms on the mezzanine floor. Also typical of the architect is the use of the external spaces which are divided to the east and the west, allowing a gradual view of the hanging gardens along the road.

The building was added to the Rollo of 1664 in the first Bussolo, the highest category, intended to host cardinals, princes, viceroys and governors. Financial problems forced the new owner, Bartolomeo Balbi, to rent out part of the building to Giuseppe Maria Durazzo. He finally sold the whole building to Marcello Durazzo in 1710. From 1735 onwards the main floor rooms were redecorated by Giacomo Boni, Giuseppe Davolio, Paolo Gerolamo Piola and Francesco Maria Costa. In 1774 the architect Emanuele Andrea Tagliafichi was commissioned to design the area upstream of the building.

It houses one of the most important private art collections in Italy, including works by Titian, Francesco Albani, Brueghel the Elder, Carracci, Valerio Castello, Domenichino, Anthony van Dyck, Grechetto, Luca Giordano, Guercino, Guercino, Magnasco, Mulinaretto, Piola, Procaccini, Reni, Ribera, Rubens and Strozzi. It also has a large archive holding papers on many members of the families inhabiting the house who have influenced Genoa's history, though the Palazzo's library and manuscript collection commissioned by Giacomo Filippo Durazzo in the 18th century were recently transferred to the Palazzo Durazzo Pallavicini in Luccoli - it belonged to the Durazzo family in the same way as the Royal palace, also located in via Balbi and the main residence of the family, sold by Marcello Durazzo to King Carlo Felice in 1824 and which became the State Museum, of the Durazzo alla Meridiana palace, the last residence of the Durazzo family, of the Durazzo-Centurione villa in Santa Margherita Ligure, municipal property and of many other buildings that belonged to the Genoese family - it also belonged to the Durazzo family like the palazzo Reale (also on the via Balbi, which was the family's main residence until sold to king Carlo Felice in 1824 by Marcello Durazzo, becoming a State Museum), Palazzo Durazzo alla Meridiana (the Durazzo family's last residence), Villa Durazzo-Centurione di Santa Margherita Ligure (city property) and many other buildings belonging to that family.

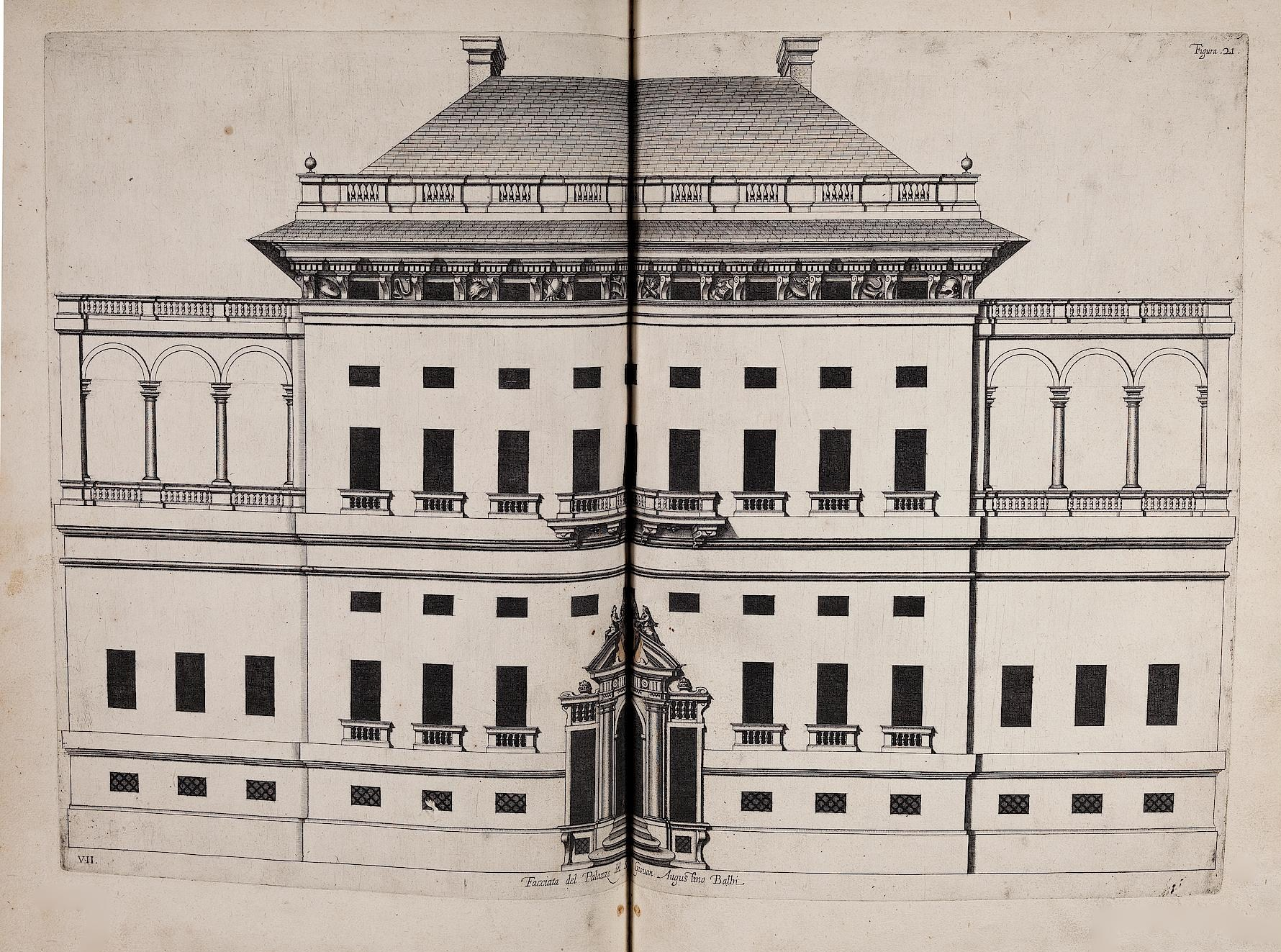
From Peter Paul Rubens - Palazzi di Genova, vol. II

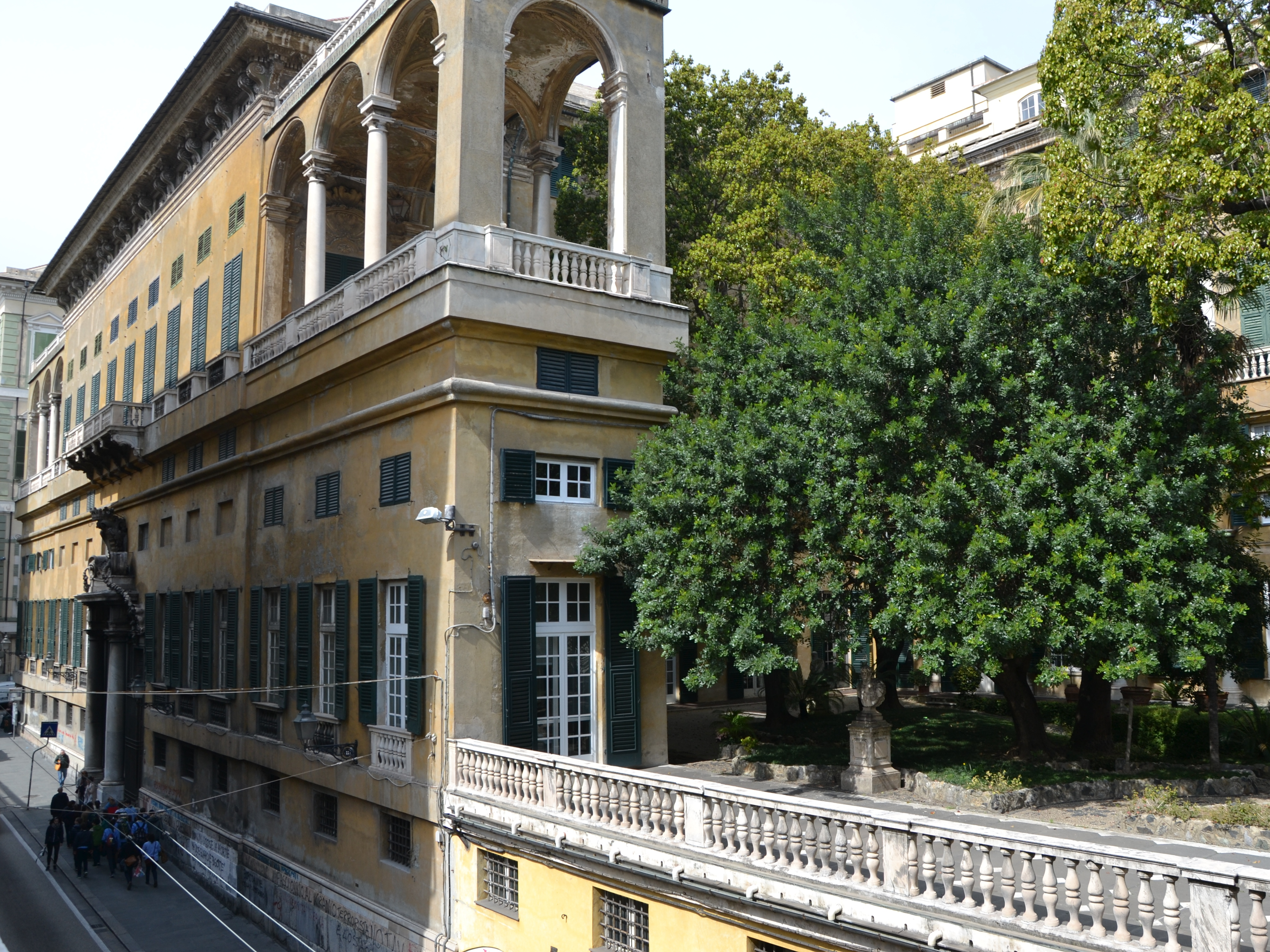
Garden

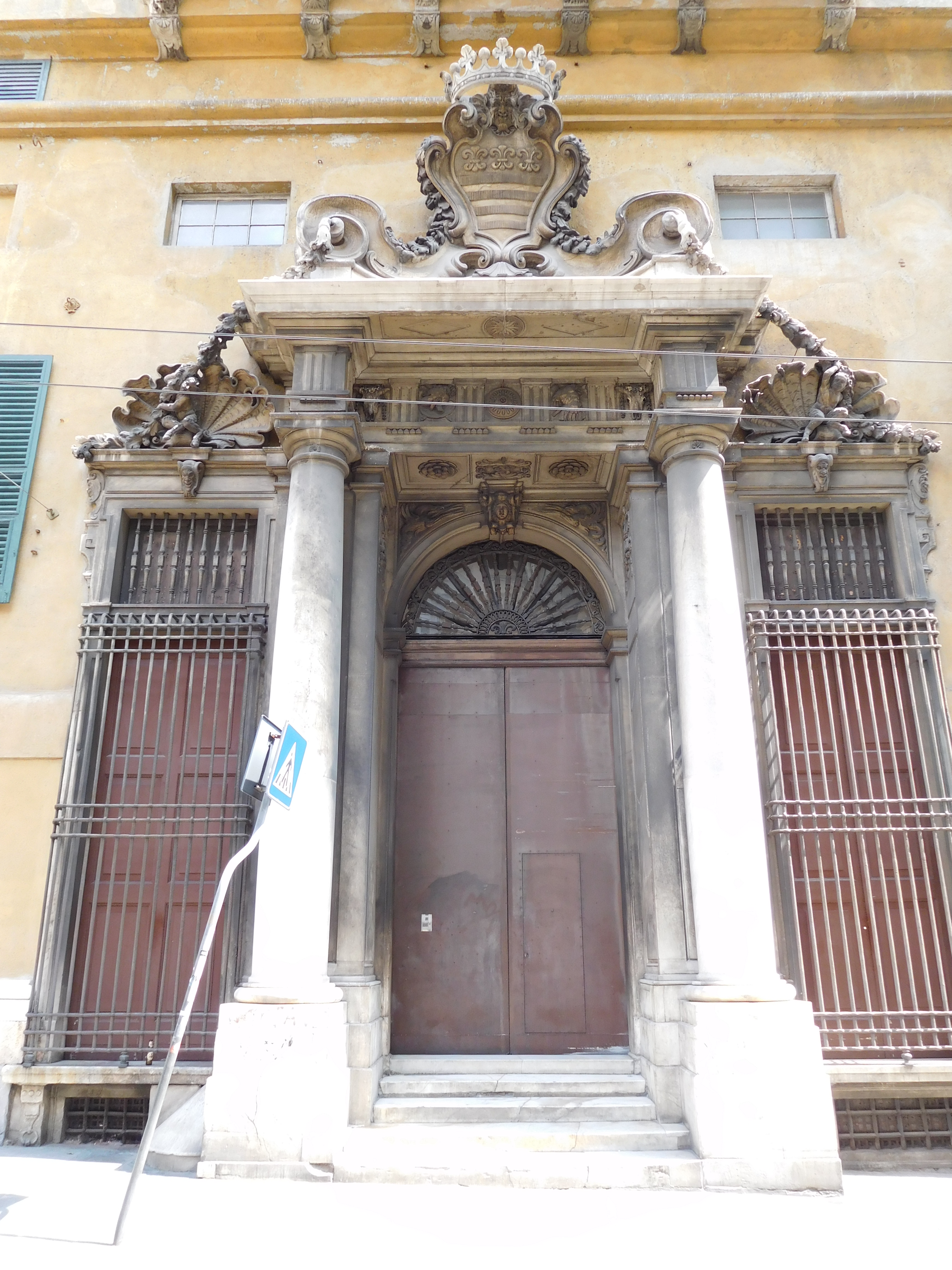
Main door

== Bibliography ==
- (in Italian) Luca Leoncini "Da Tintoretto a Rubens. Capolavori della Collezione Durazzo", exhibition catalogue, Milano 2004;
- (in Italian) Angela Valenti Durazzo "I Durazzo da schiavi a dogi della Repubblica di Genova" Massetti Eugenio Editore, Roccafranca, Brescia 2004
