= Palazzo Carrega-Cataldi =

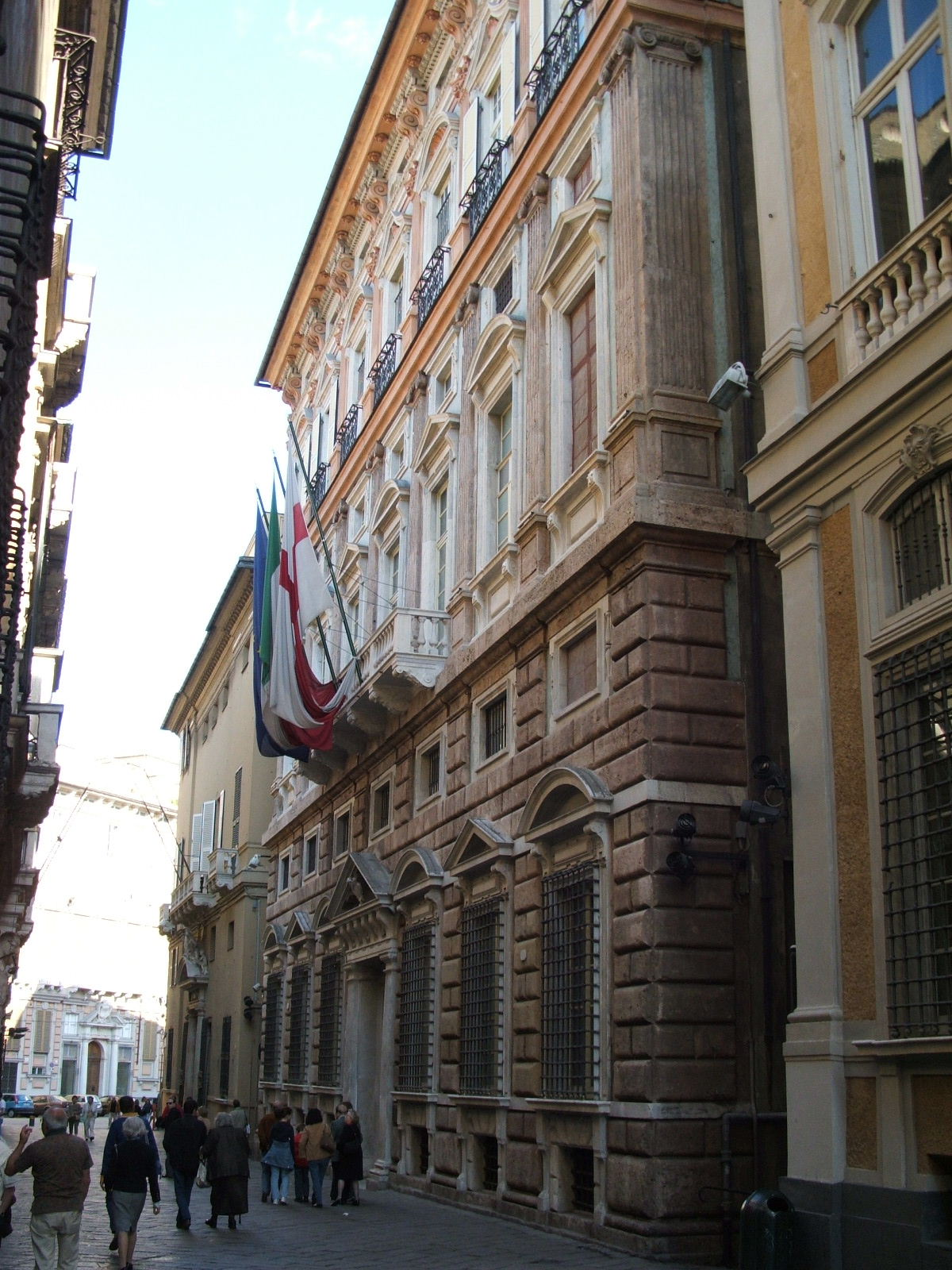
- Facade of the Palazzo Palazzo Carrega-Cataldi in via Garibaldi 4
- Interactive map of the Palazzo Carrega-Cataldi area
- Alternative names: Palazzo Tobia Pallavicino

General information
- Status: In use
- Type: Palace
- Architectural style: Mannerist
- Location: Genoa, Italy, 4, Via Garibaldi
- Coordinates: 44.410897°N 8.934319°E
- Current tenants: offices
- Construction started: 1558
- Completed: 1561

Design and construction
- Architect: Giovan Battista Castello "il Bergamasco"

UNESCO World Heritage Site
- Part of: Genoa: Le Strade Nuove and the system of the Palazzi dei Rolli
- Criteria: Cultural: (ii)(iv)
- Reference: 1211
- Inscription: 2006 (30th Session)

The Palazzo Carrega-Cataldi or Palazzo Tobia Pallavicino is a building located in via Garibaldi (Genoa) at number 4 in the historic centre of Genoa, included on 13 July 2006 in the list of the 42 palaces inscribed in the Rolli di Genova that became World Heritage by UNESCO on that date. The building is now the headquarters of Genoa's Chamber of Commerce.

== History and description ==
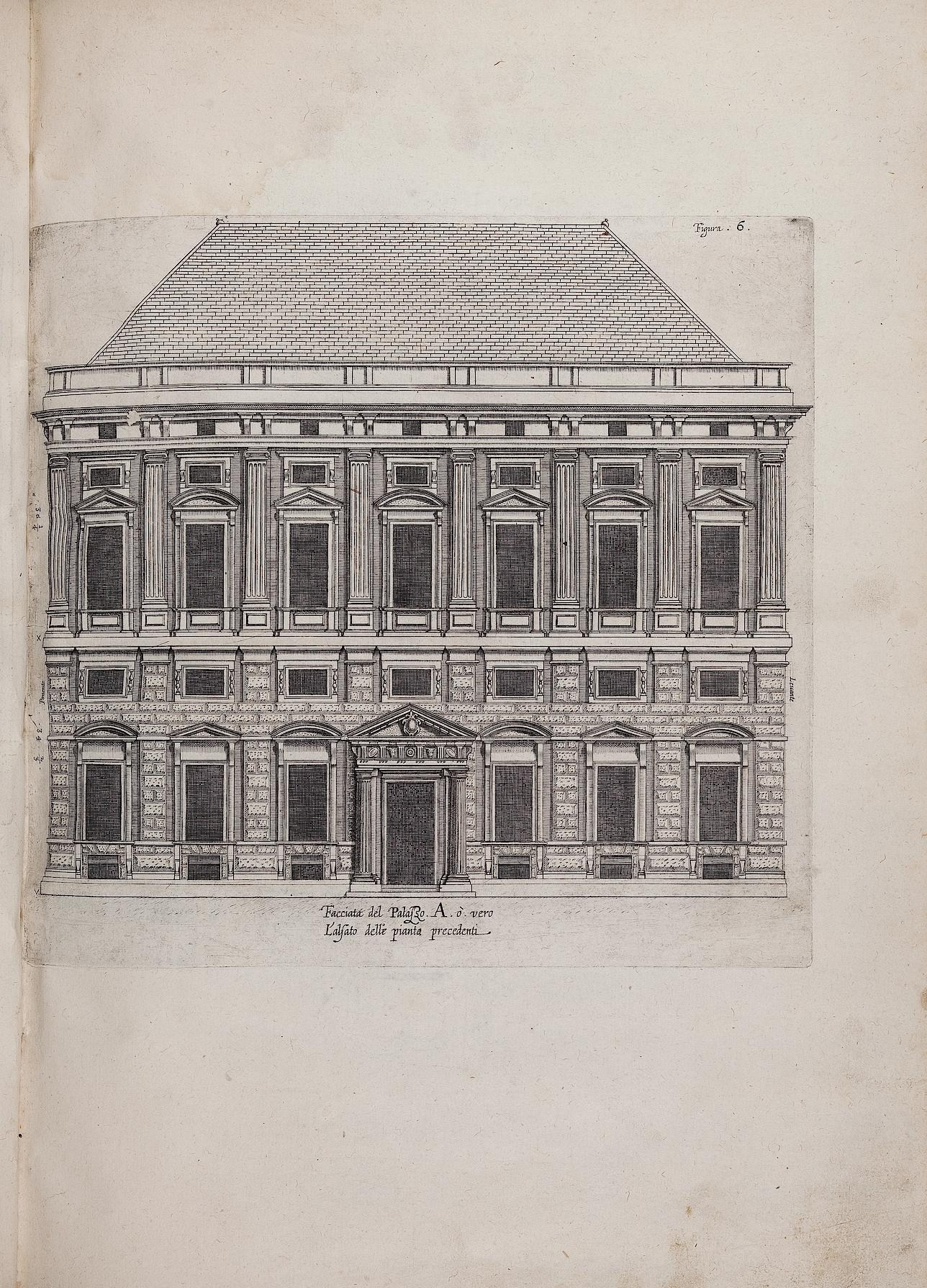
P.P. Rubens, Palazzi di Genova, Antwerp — 1622

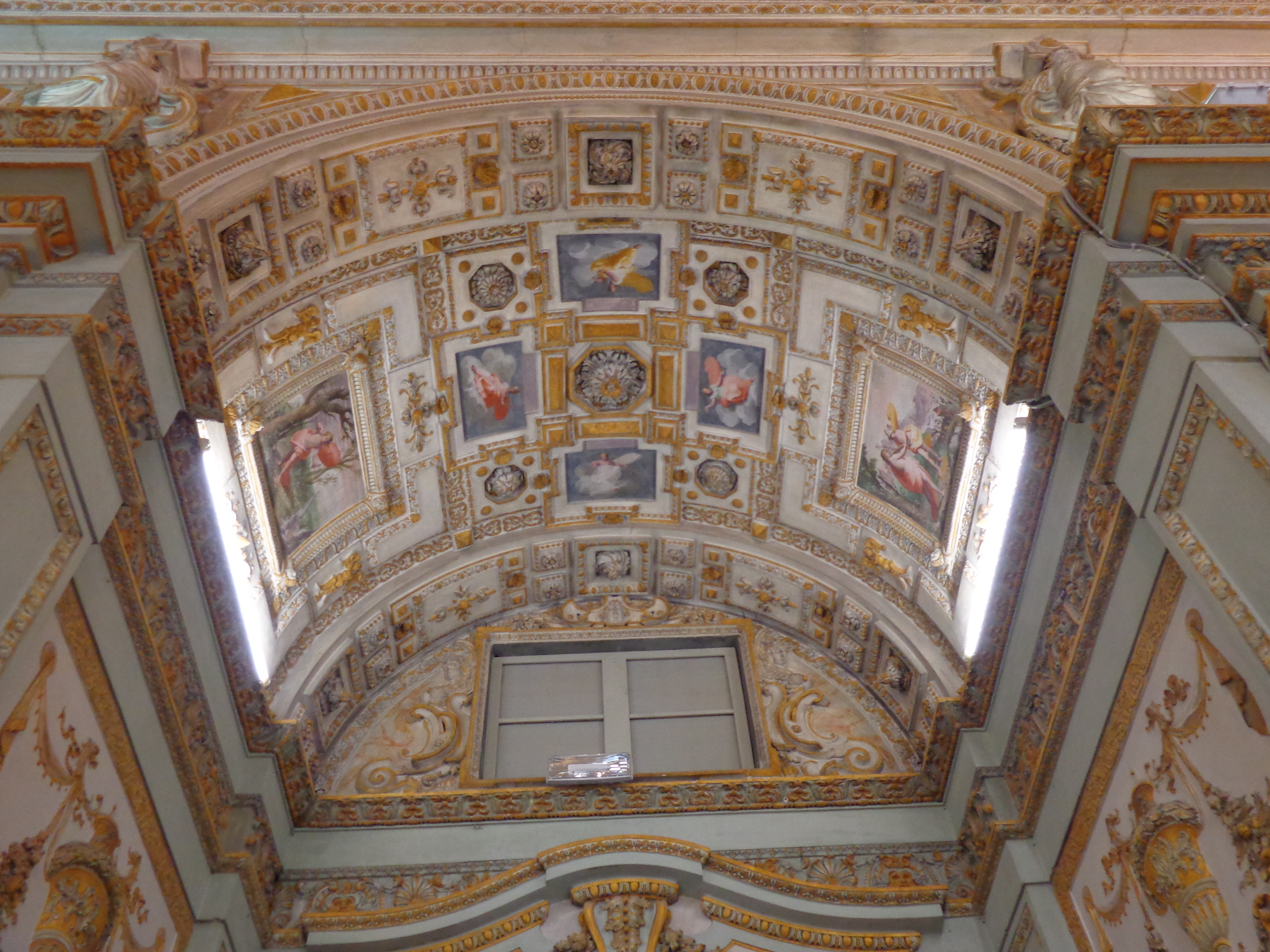
Giovanni Battista Castello, atrium vault

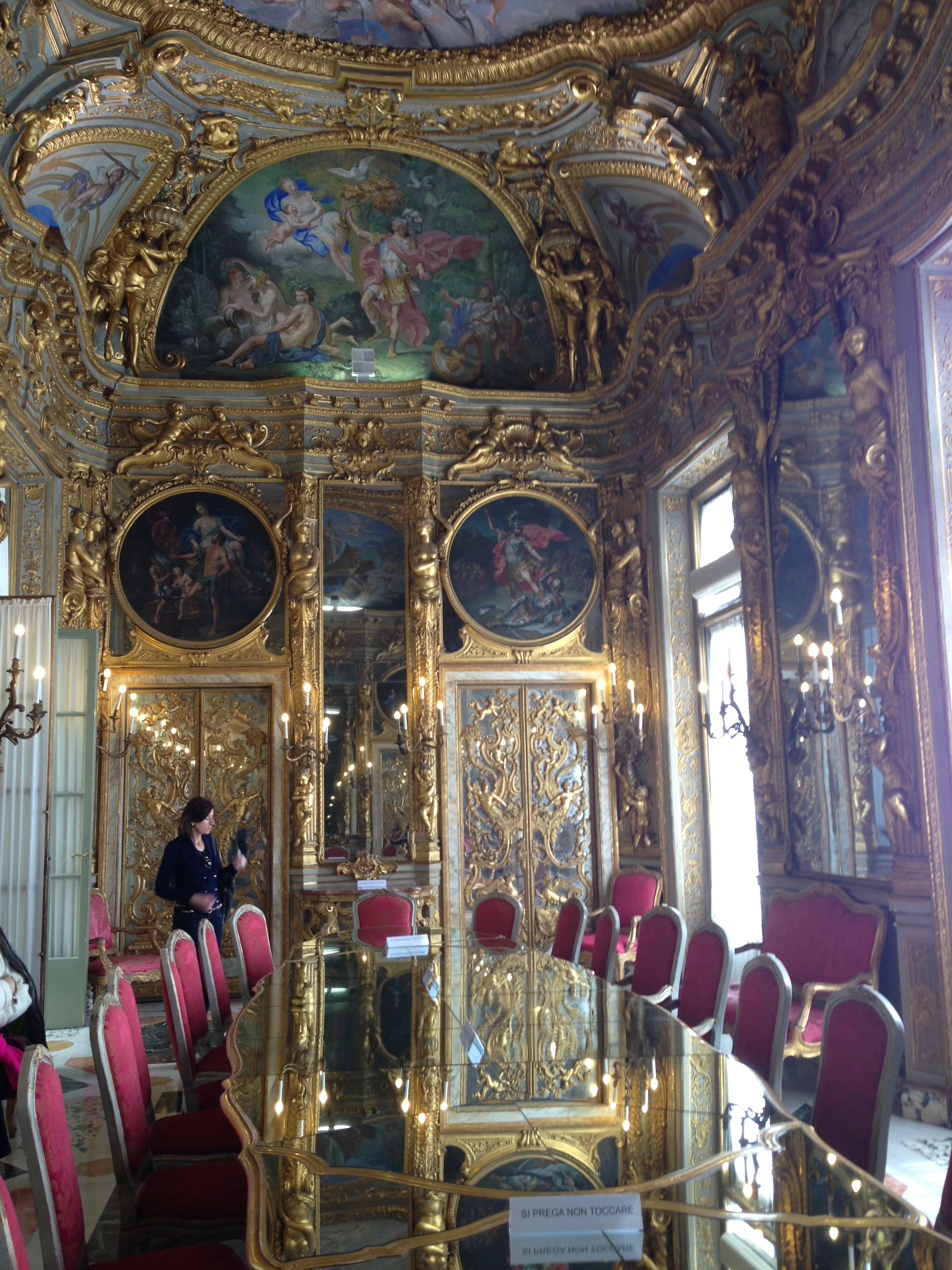
Lorenzo De Ferrari, Golden Gallery, 1734—1744

The palace was built between 1558 and 1561 for Tobia Pallavicino by Giovan Battista Castello «il Bergamasco» with the collaboration of Bartolomeo Riccio, Domenico Solari and Antonio Roderio. This is the first known work executed in Genoa by the Bergamasco, on which he worked at the same time as the decoration of the suburban villa of Pallavicino himself, designed a few years earlier by Galeazzo Alessi, known as Villa Pallavicino delle Peschiere. Tobia Pallavicino, a wealthy alum merchant, was a descendant of one of the city's oldest noble families and held numerous positions for the Genoese republic. He was among the first to purchase a large area for the construction of the family palace overlooking the Strada Nuova designed a few years earlier by Cantoni, with a garden, which disappeared during the 18th-century extensions, opening onto the Piazza del Ferro behind it.

In the construction of the palazzo, Bergamasco, already active in his home town as a decorator and fresco painter, proceeded simultaneously and coherently with the decoration of the external and internal surfaces. The clarity of the façade is Renaissance and of clear Alessian influence, with ashlar cladding in final stone on the ground floor, and pilasters of Ionic order on the first floor that harmoniously mark the façade.

The 16th century construction consisted of a cubic block of two floors plus two mezzanines. The building did not undergo any major alterations until the beginning of the 18th century, when it passed into the ownership of the Carrega family and was raised by one storey and considerably enlarged: two perpendicular arms and the rear body were built, delimited towards Piazza del Ferro by a simple facade with plasterwork.

=== 16th-century decoration ===
The interior decoration reflects the two phases of construction: in particular, the two vestibules on the ground and main floors, completely covered in late Renaissance decoration, have survived intact. Here the inspiration to Roman models and in particular Raphaelesque ones is evident on the part of Castello, author of the design and the frescoes enclosed between the stuccoes and grottesche. On the ground floor, delicately modulated white stucco frames run between fanciful, minute grotesque decorations and larger frescoes depicting full-length Olympian deities, while the central octagons depict Juno and Leda. On the side walls and on the Vault of the vestibule of the main floor, which is brighter, the colours of the decorations become brighter. They too are entirely covered, thanks to Bergamasco's intervention, with stuccos and grotesques and frescoed panels representing Apollo Citaredo with the Muses and Musician figures. Here too the unity of the architectural and decorative project is evident.

=== 18th-century rooms ===
Two rooms in particular belong to the eighteenth century phase, the chapel and the gilded gallery, masterpieces of the late Genoese Baroque due to Lorenzo De Ferrari, whose last works were completed shortly before his death in 1744. In both rooms, the decoration becomes all-embracing, blending walls, ceilings, doors, mirrors and furnishings into a sophisticated scenographic apparatus intended to amaze the spectator.

The chapel is a small enclosed room, intended to highlight the famous statue of the Virgin and Child (known as the Madonna Carrega), sculpted by Pierre Puget around 1680, which is currently on display at the Museo di Sant'Agostino and was replaced by a copy in 2004. The artist uses a fake trompe-l'œil architecture in gilded stucco and fresco to fake a colonnade open onto the garden, as a theatrical backdrop for the marble group of the Virgin, which stands out thanks to the contrast between the whiteness of the marble and the bright colours of the background. Similarly on the ceiling, the fake stucco architecture creates an oculus framing the fresco with a flight of angels. The door wings are painted on canvas by the same painter who depicted two medallions with the Annunciation and the Nativity in monochrome.

The complex decorative machine of the Galleria Dorata realised by De Ferrari probably in collaboration with Diego Francesco Carlone, represents one of the highest achievements of the late Genoese Baroque. It is placed at the end of the 18th-century structure of the palazzo, and is a significant example of the Rococo taste in Genoa. It was entirely designed by De Ferrari between 1734 and 1744 following a unitary design that blends together gilded stuccoes, mirrors and frescoes. The entire decorative cycle is inspired by the stories of Aeneas; in the central medallion of the vault and in the roundels on canvas the most important episodes in the Aeneid are depicted. On the oval of the vault is the Council of the Gods, with Venus, Aeneas' mother in the presence of Jupiter. In the two large lunettes are The Landing of Aeneas and Aeneas and Venus, while in the four roundels are The Flight from Troy, Aeneas and Dido, Venus commissioning Vulcan with Aeneas' weapons and The Defeat of Turn.

== Picture Gallery ==
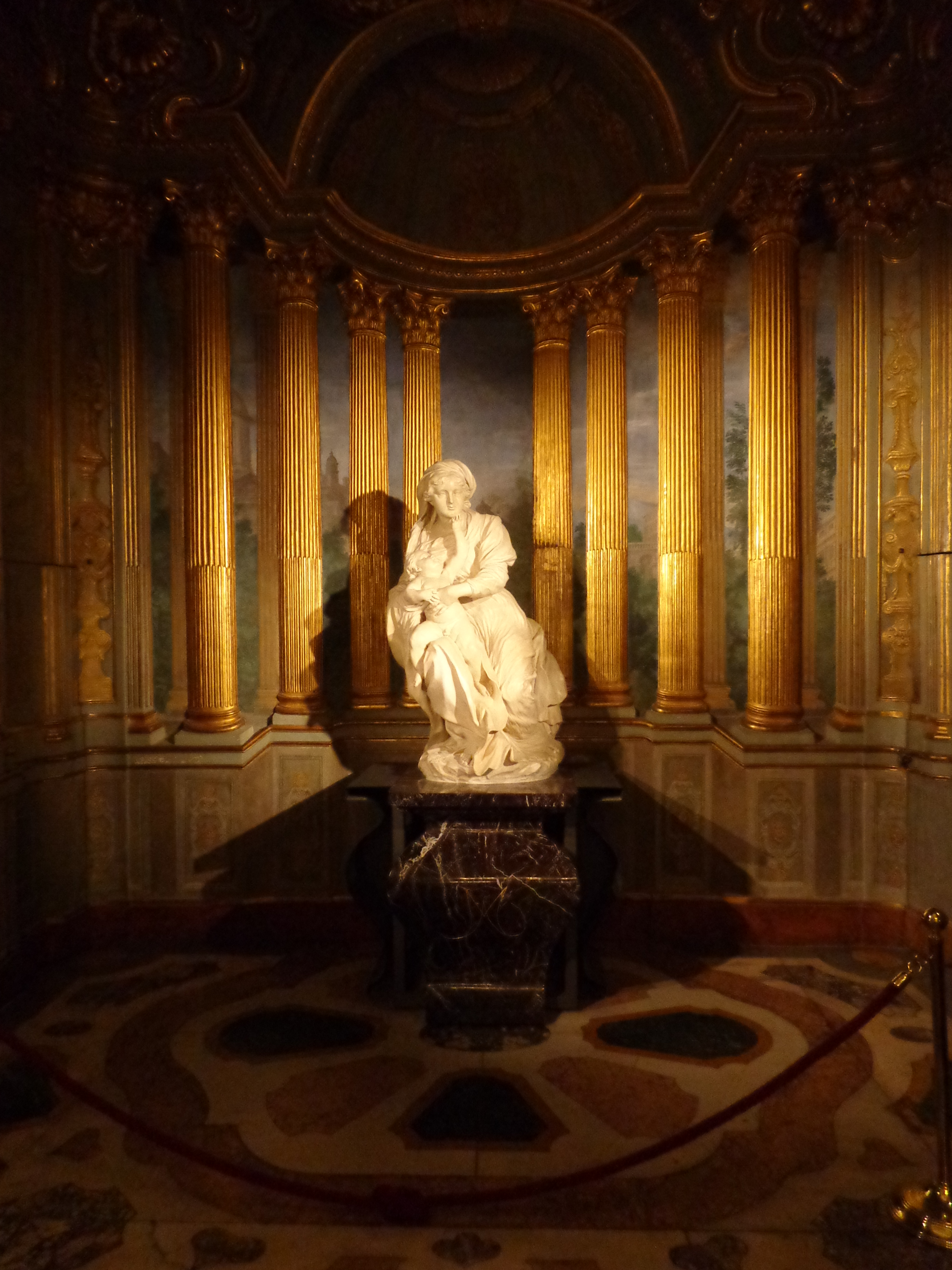
Chapel with the Madonna Carrega by Puget

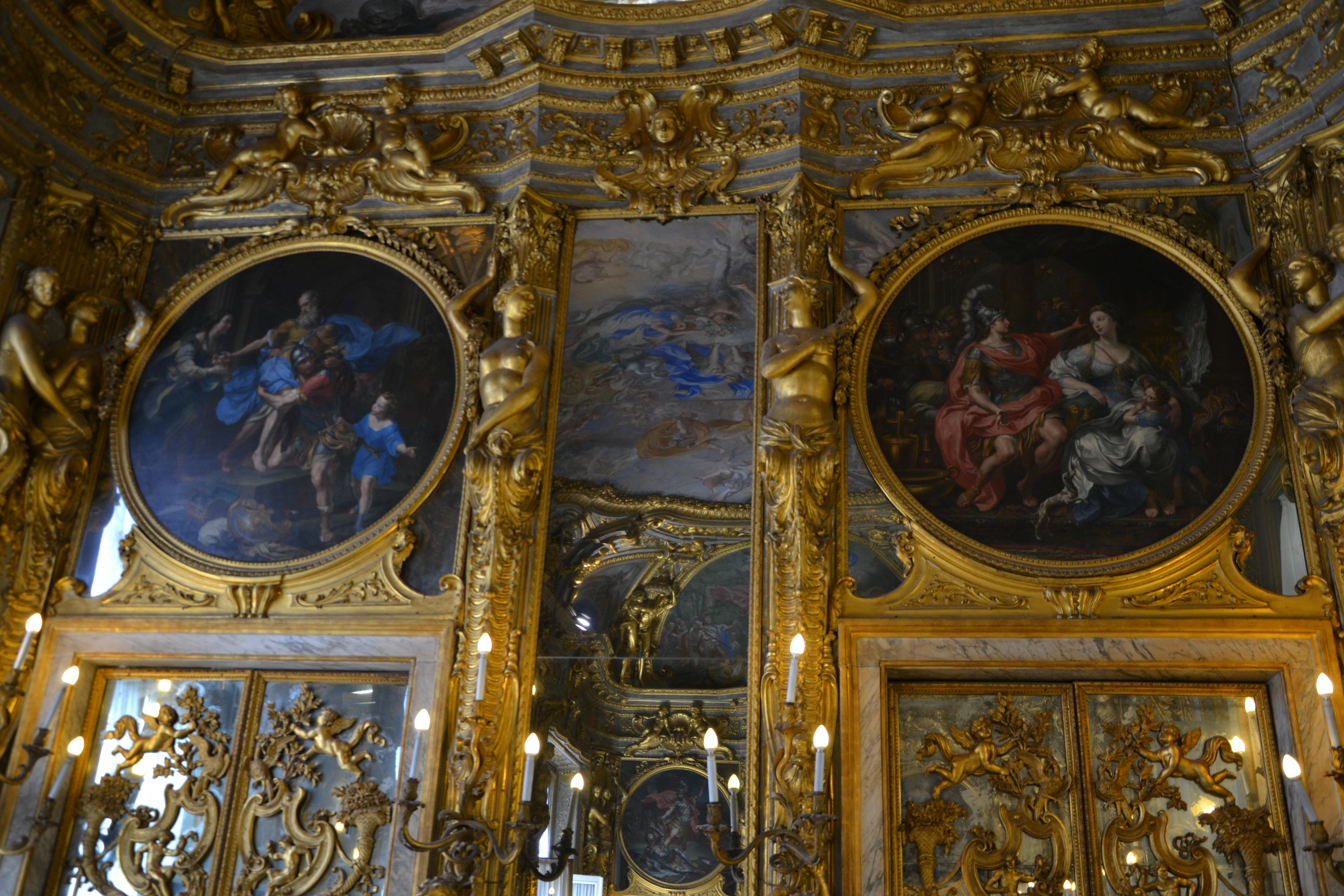
Lorenzo De Ferrari, Stories of Aeneas

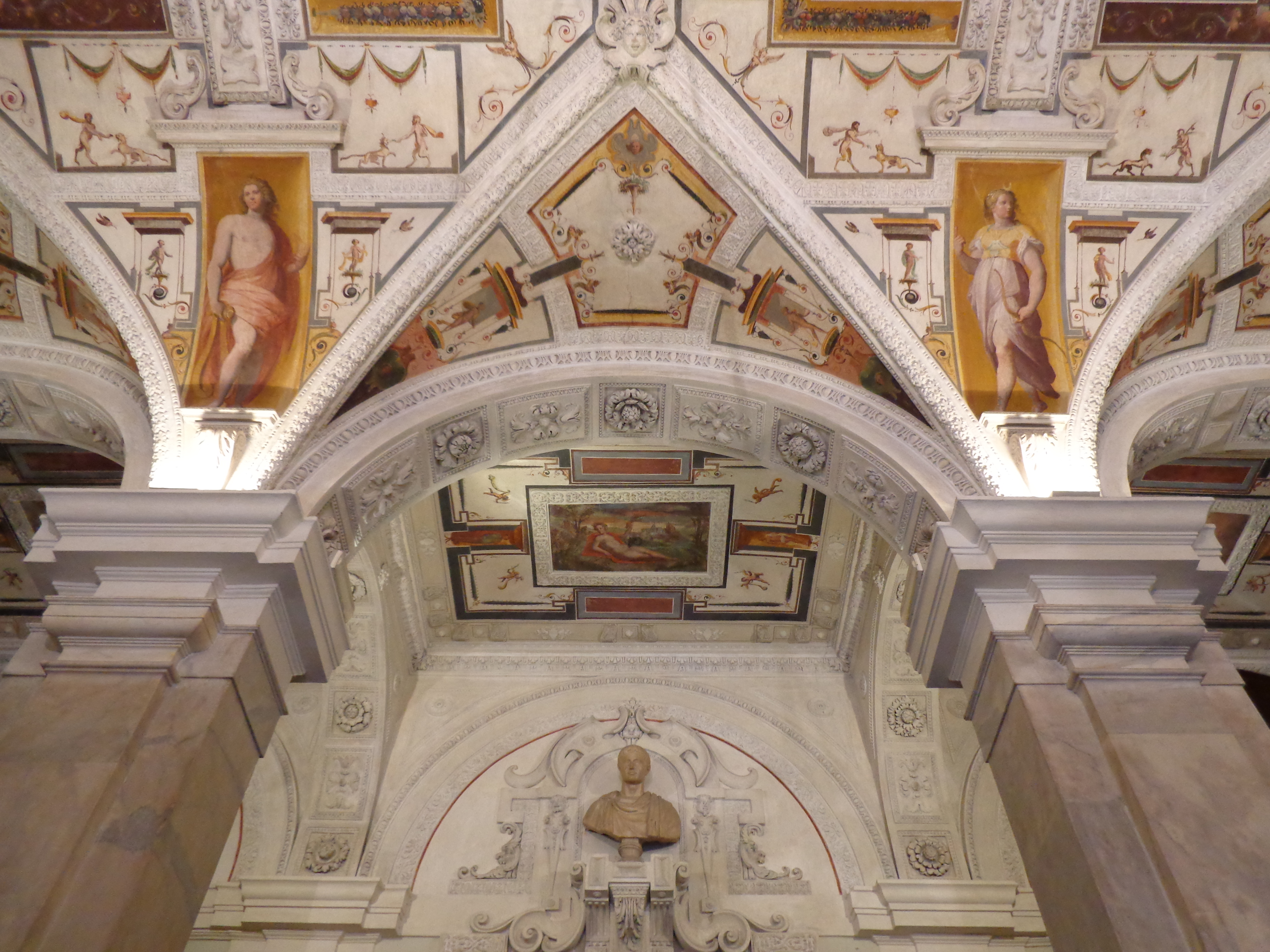
Giovan Battista Castello "the Bergamasque", Detail of the Atrium

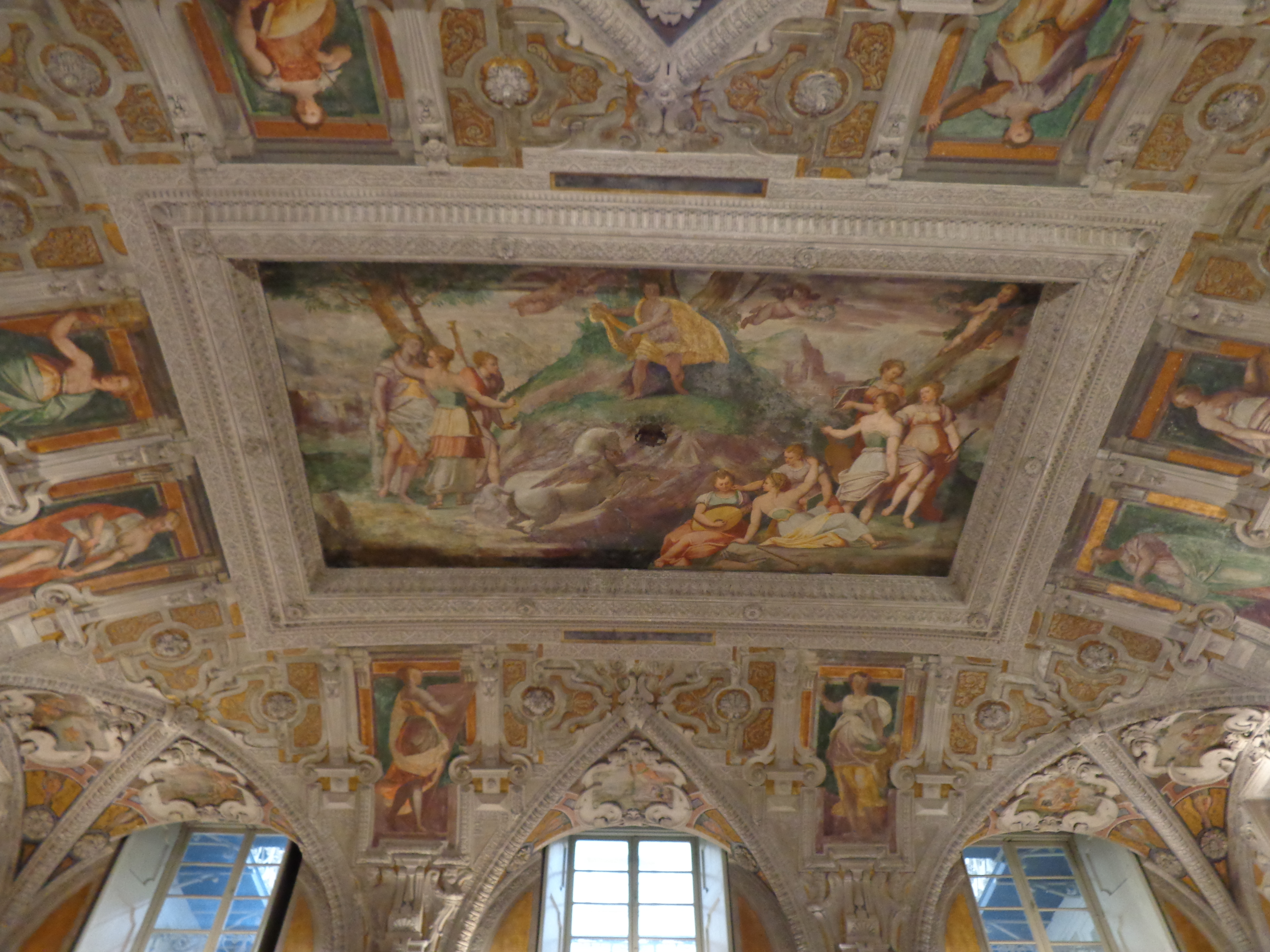
Giovan Battista Castello"the Bergamasque", Ceiling of the Parnassus room

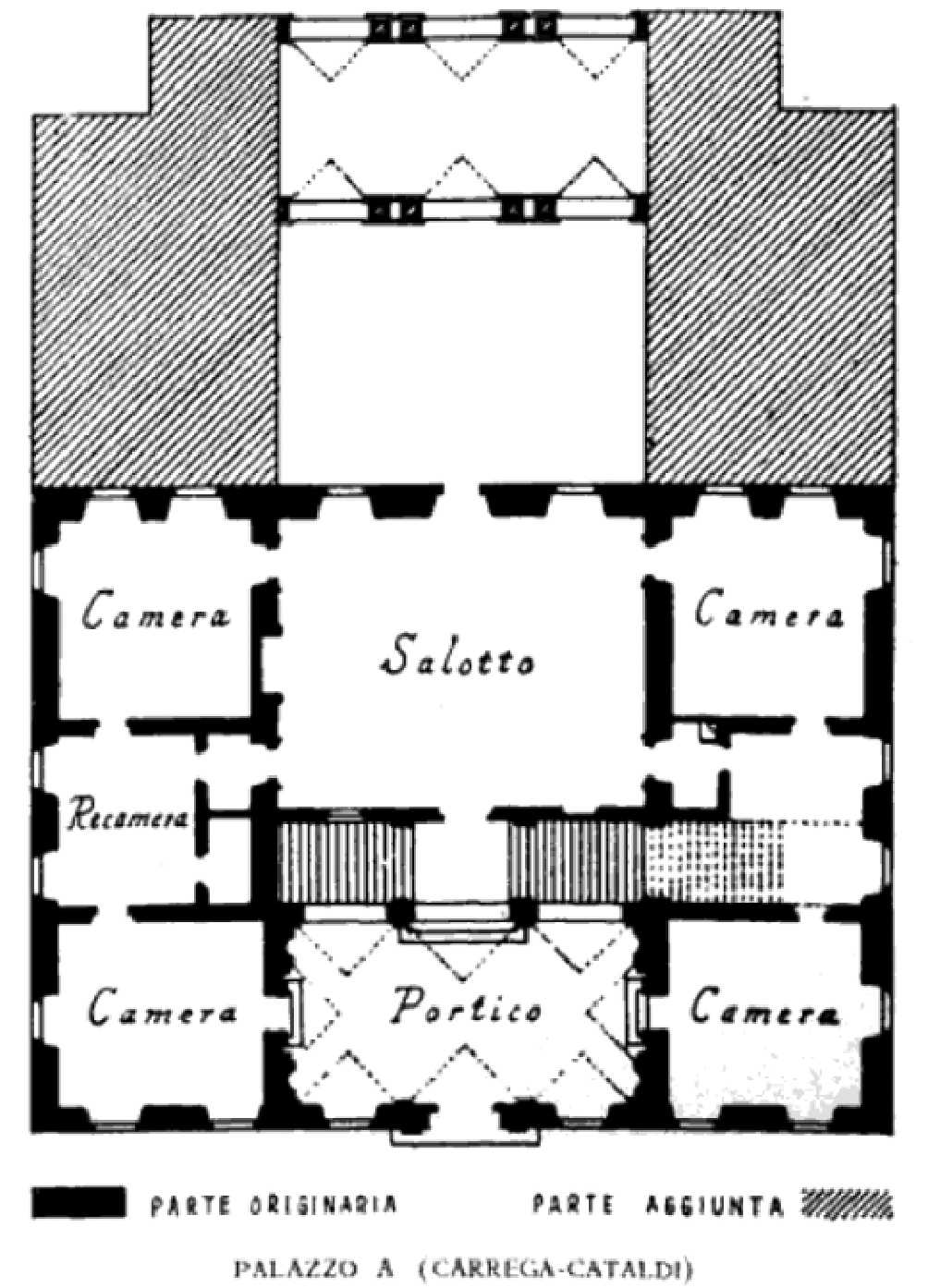
Plan of the Palace in 1938, with new and original parts as described by Mario Labò

== Bibliography ==
=== Italian sources ===
- Fiorella Caraceni Poleggi (1992). Una strada rinascimentale: via Garibaldi a Genova. Genova: Sagep.
- Ezia Gavazza; Lauro Magnani (2000). Pittura e decorazione a Genova e in Liguria nel Settecento. Genova: Sagep.
- Elena Parma (1999). La pittura in Liguria. Il Cinquecento. Banca Carige.
- Martin Pierre Gauthier (1818). Les plus beaux édifices de la ville de Gênes et de ses environs (in French).
