= Villa Pallavicini =

Villa Pallavicini or Villa Pallavicino is the name of several Italian villas, including:

- Villa Durazzo-Pallavicini, Genoa
- Villa Gandolfi Pallavicini, Bologna
- Villa Pallavicino, Busseto
- Villa Pallavicino, Stresa
- Villa Pallavicino, Salerano Canavese
- Villa Pallavicino delle Peschiere, Genoa

== See also ==
- Palazzo Pallavicini, the name of multiple Italian palaces
- Pallavicini family
