= Palazzo Cosmo Centurione =

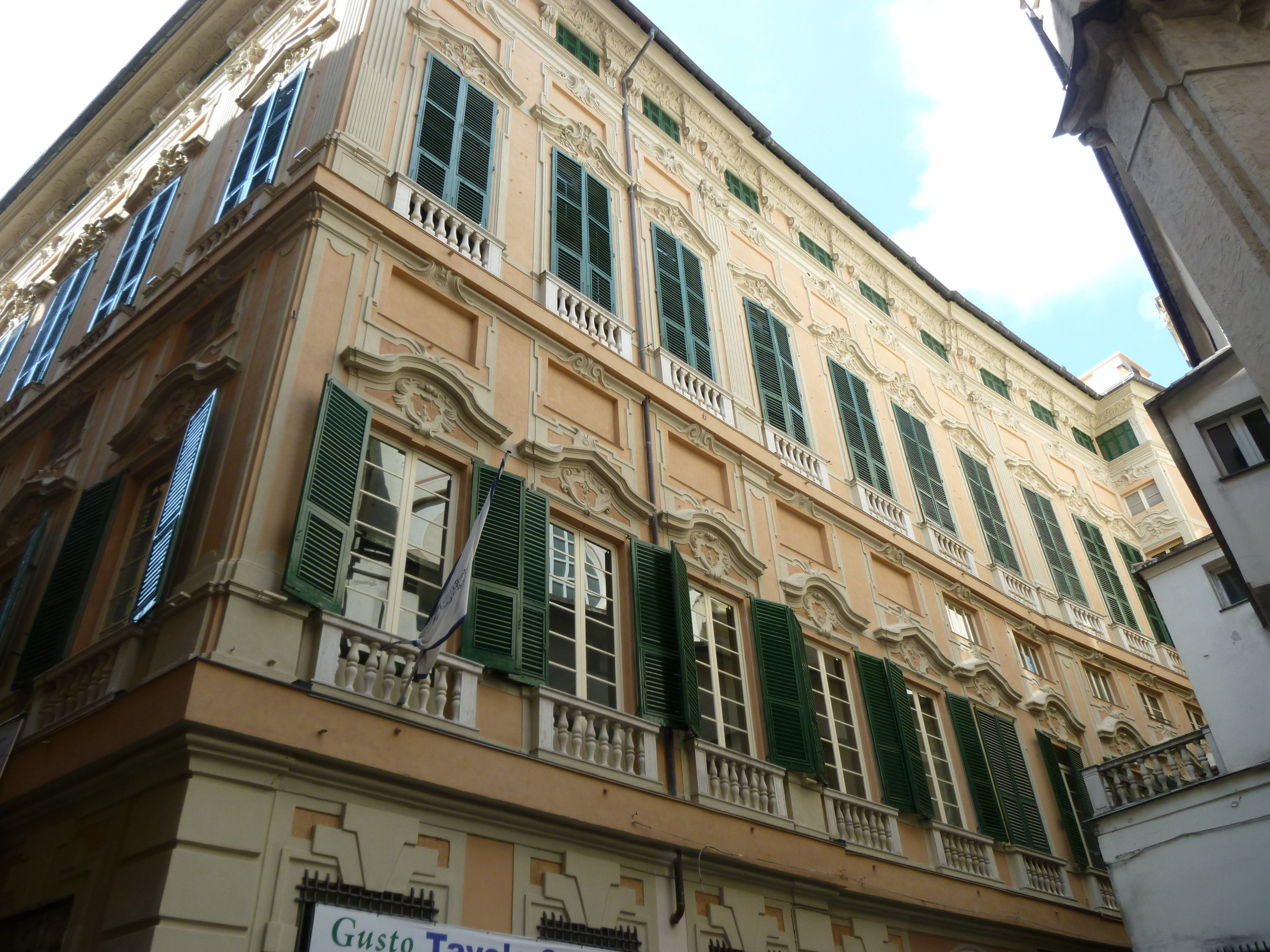
- Palazzo Cosmo Centurione, via Lomellini 8, Genoa
- Interactive map of the Palazzo Cosmo Centurione area
- Alternative names: Palazzo Durazzo Pallavicini, Palazzo di Gerolamo III Pallavicino

General information
- Status: In use
- Type: Palace
- Architectural style: Mannerist, Baroque
- Location: Genoa, Italy, 8, Via Lomellini
- Coordinates: 44.412633°N 8.92960°E
- Current tenants: housing/offices
- Construction started: XVI
- Completed: XVI
- Renovated: 1718-1724; 1756-1763

Design and construction
- Architects: Giacomo Viano Bartolomeo, Giovanni Orsolino.

UNESCO World Heritage Site
- Part of: Genoa: Le Strade Nuove and the system of the Palazzi dei Rolli
- Criteria: Cultural: (ii)(iv)
- Reference: 1211
- Inscription: 2006 (30th Session)

The Palazzo Cosmo Centurione is a building located in the historical centre of Genoa, in Via Lomellini at no. 8, included on 13 July 2006 in the list of the 42 palaces inscribed in the Rolli di Genova that became World Heritage by UNESCO on that date. Also known as the Palazzo Durazzo Pallavicini or Palazzo di Gerolamo III Pallavicino, from the name of its successive owners, due to its architecture and the frescoes preserved inside, it is an outstanding example of Genoese Baroque.

== History and description ==
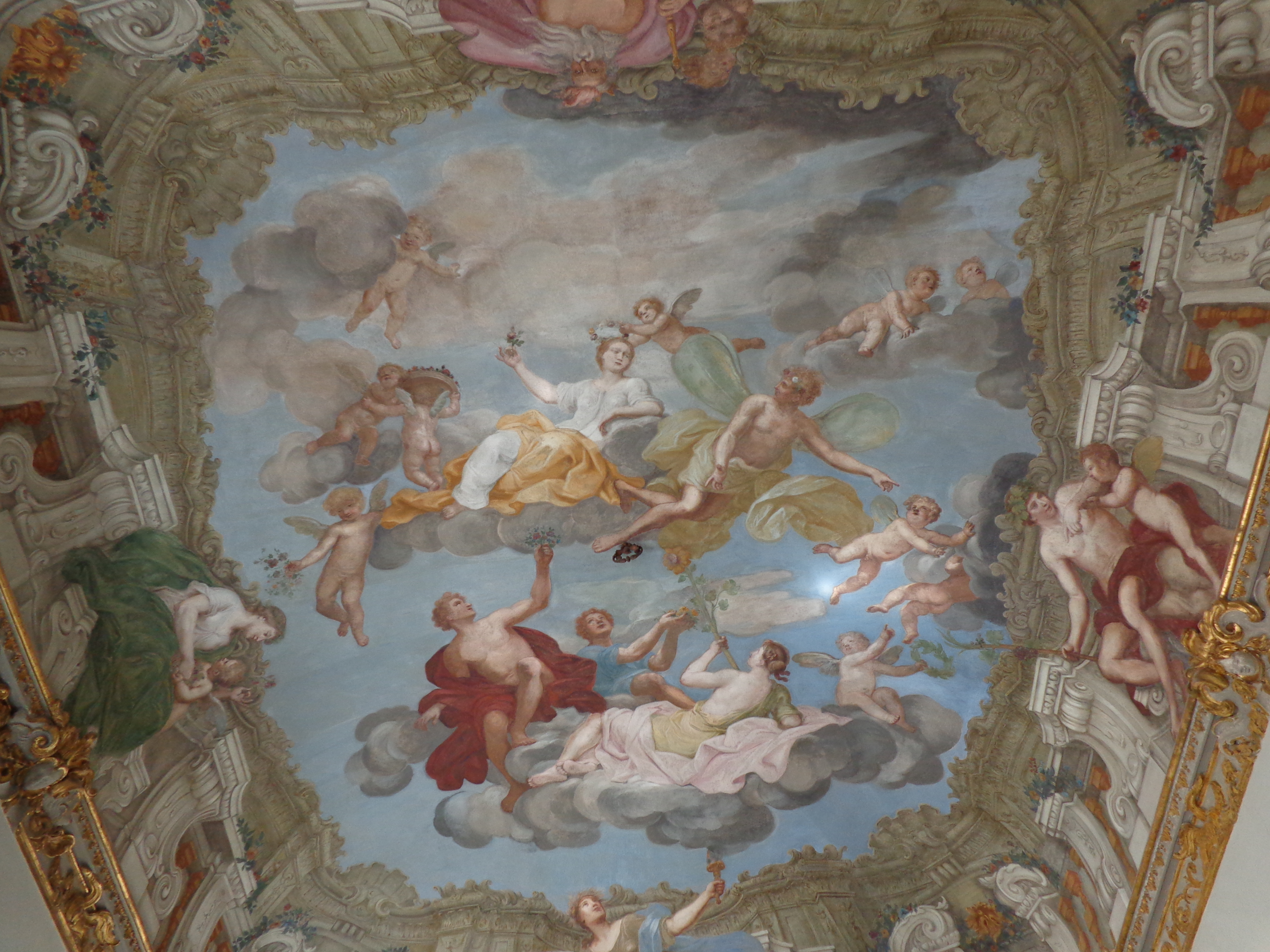
Giacomo Boni (painter), Stories of Zephyrus and Flora

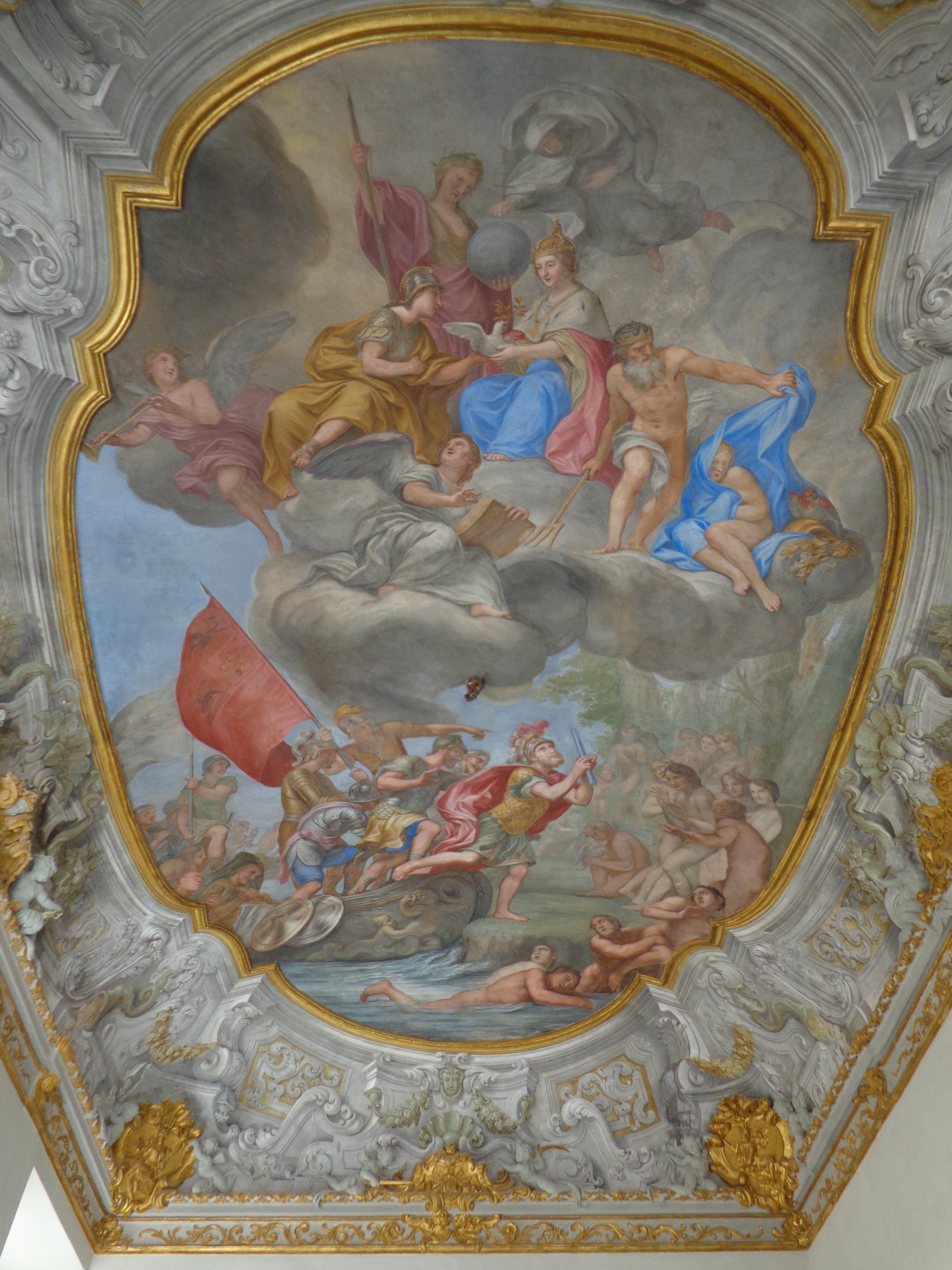
Domenico Parodi, Columbus’s Landing in the Americas

Formerly owned by the family of Giorgio Centurione, the palace came by inheritance to Senator Ansaldo Imperiale Lercari, who helped give it the grandeur that it still retains today. Built along a road axis of persistent importance to the city, the residence was positively affected by the construction of the adjoining church and oratory of San Filippo Neri between 1674 and 1755.

The palace's current appearance was given to it at the beginning of the 18th century by the wealthy Pallavicini family, who became its owners following the marriage of Paolo Gerolamo III to Caterina Imperiale Lercari Pallavicini, Marchioness of Mombaruzzo, who brought it as a dowry. Having decided to make it his permanent residence, the palace was, between 1718 and 1724, entirely renovated by the architect Giacomo Viano, hired by Paolo Gerolamo III Pallavicini. The facades, the atrium and the monumental staircase, and the representative flat on the second piano nobile are due to these. Viano intervened on the original 16th-century layout, translating the atrium and the monumental staircase into a substantially different spatial language, although the columns and marbles belonging to the previous staircase were prevalently adopted.

Viano is credited with the main elevations towards San Filippo and Via Lomellini, marked by string-course cornices, pilasters, tympanums and floral motifs, and the creation of a gallery, frescoed by Domenico Parodi. By the same Parodi, commissioned by Paolo Gerolamo III Pallavicino in 1730, are the frescoes with «The Landing of Columbus in the Americas», and «Allegory of the Genoese Race», while by Giacomo Boni are the stories of Zephyrus and Flora: architectural and decorative evidence of Arcadian taste.

Between 1756 and 1763 the palace was definitively enlarged, occupying the block at the rear, and enriched with a hanging garden «to give light to the added building». The authors of this delicate intervention of urban and architectural reconfiguration, substantially aimed at accommodating the different flats of the two owners, the brothers Giuseppe and Domenico Pallavicini, sons of Paolo Gerolamo, are the Bartolomeo and Giovanni Orsolino.

== Bibliography ==
=== Italian sources ===
- L. Magnani, E. Gavazza, Pittura e decorazione a Genova e in Liguria nel Settecento, Genova 2000
- E. Gavazza, Dai laghi lombardi l’arte degli stuccatori. Pratica, diffusione, aggiornamento del gusto, in Genova e l’Europa continentale: Austria, Germania, Svizzera: opere, artisti, committenti, collezionisti, a cura di P. Boccardo e C. Di Fabio, Genova 2004, pp. 158–173.
- A. Leonardi, «Istruzioni» per affrescare una stanza. Domenico Parodi nei palazzi Pallavicino e Brignole-Sale, in Genoese Way of life. Vivere da collezionisti tra Seicento e Settecento, Roma, Gangemi, 2013, pp. 173–185.
