= Palazzi di Genova =

1622 book by Peter Paul Rubens

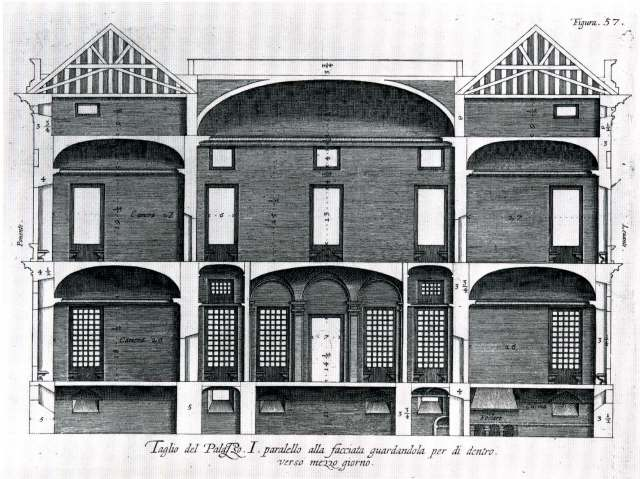
Plate 57 of the first volume of Palazzi di Genova, 1622

Palazzi di Genova is a 1622 book written and illustrated by Peter Paul Rubens, depicting and describing the palaces of Genoa, Italy in 72 plates. A second volume with 67 further plates was added the same year, and they are usually found (and reprinted) together. The illustrations of the second part are usually considered not to be by Rubens though. It is the only book Rubens published himself (although he provided illustrations for a number of other books).

The first volume contained plans, facades and additional views of 12 of the palaces of Genoa; the second book contained a further 19 palaces and 4 churches. Included are many of the Palazzi dei Rolli. They were seen by Rubens during his trips to Italy (probably late 1605 and early 1606). Rubens was an admirer of the architecture of Italy, as evidenced in his own house, the Rubenshuis in Antwerp. The Genoese style, developed by architects like Galeazzo Alessi, became very popular, and their distribution in Northern Europe was at least partially due to the book by Rubens. Examples of this include the Hôtel de Ville, Lyon.

== Publication history ==
- 1622: first edition, no publisher mentioned
- 1652, 1663: reprinted twice by Giacomo Meursio (or Jacob van Meurs), Antwerp, with the title Palazzi Antichi di Genova; an additional volume, not by Rubens, was added with the title Palazzi Moderni di Genova
- 1708: reprinted by Hendrik and Cornelis Verdussen, Antwerp
- 1755: reprinted by Arkstée and Merkus, Amsterdam and Leipzig, with a French introduction
- 1924: reprinted by Der Zirkel as volume 3 in the Bibliothek Alter Meister der Baukunst, with German introduction
- 1968: reprinted by Benjamin Blom, New York, with English introduction
- 2002: reprinted, with commentary, in the Corpus Rubenianum Ludwig Burchard
