= Panagia Olympiotissa Monastery =

Greek Orthodox monastery in Greece

- Μονή Παναγίας Ολυμπιώτισσας
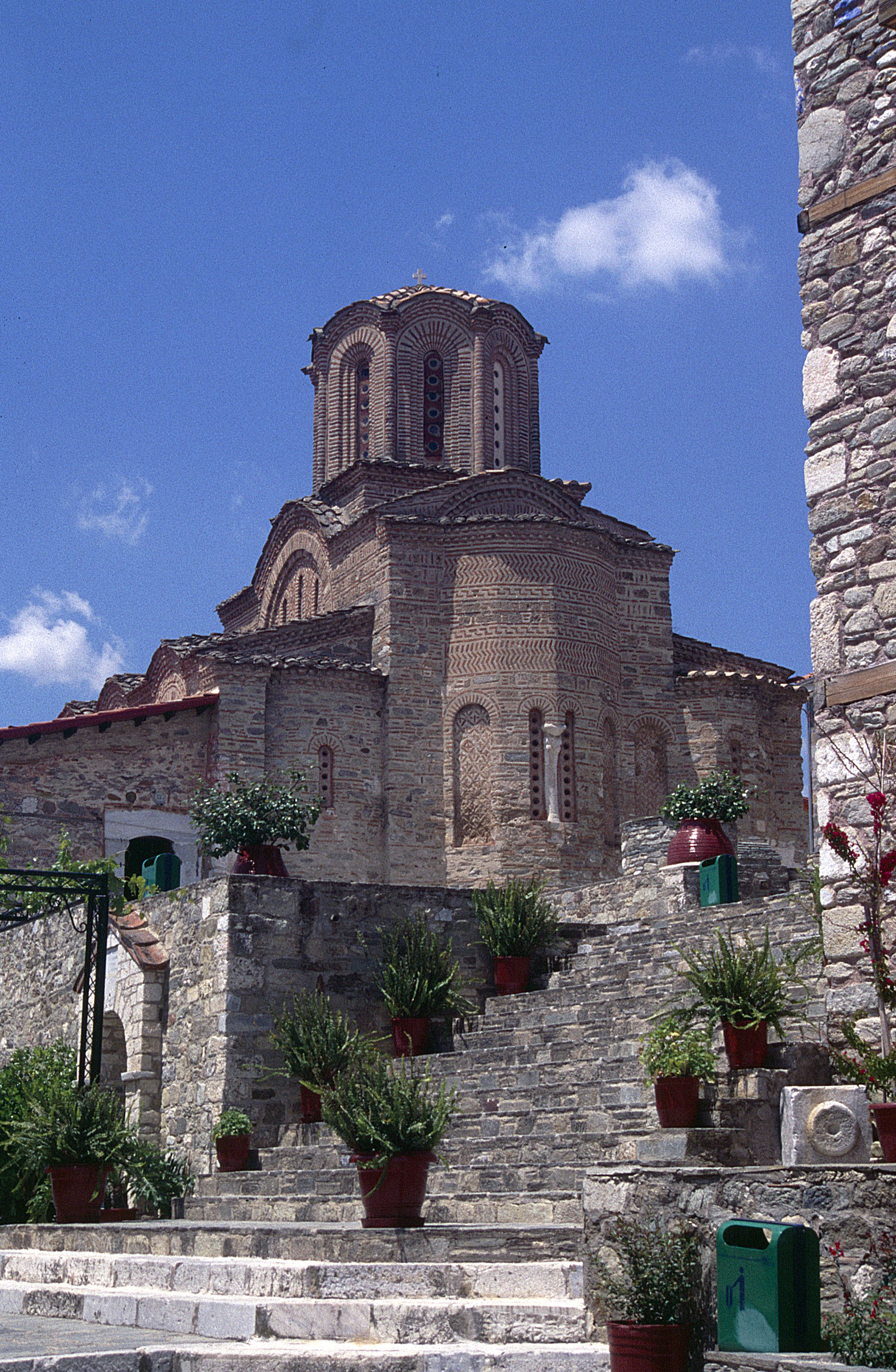
- The katholikon of the monastery

- Location within Greece
- Interactive map of Panagia Olympiotissa Monastery

Monastery information
- Denomination: Greek Orthodox
- Established: c. 1295 – c. 1304
- Dedication: Dormition of the Theotokos; Transfiguration of the Saviour
- Celebration: 5 October
- Diocese: Metropolis of Elassona

People
- Founders: Constantine Doukas; Theodore Angelos

Architecture
- Status: Monastery
- Functional status: Active
- Style: Byzantine

Site
- Location: Elassona, Thessaly
- Country: Greece
- Coordinates: 39°53′52.1″N 22°10′59.8″E

The Panagia Olympiotissa Monastery (Greek: Μονή Παναγίας Ολυμπιώτισσας, lit. 'Panagia of Mount Olympus') is a Greek Orthodox monastery in Elassona, Thessaly, Greece.

== History ==
The monastery is located on the medieval citadel of the town of Elassona, and was founded between 1295 and 1304, probably by the co-rulers of Thessaly, the sebastokratores Constantine and Theodore.

Only the main church (katholikon) survives from the original monastery complex. It comprises a domed main space with an ambulatory on three sides. Its masonry is brick-enclosed, and features use of ancient spolia. Various annexes were added at times to the katholikon, but none of them survives today, apart from a small chapel in the southern side, built in 1819 and dedicated to Saint Nektarios.

The 14th-century frescoes that decorate its interior make it "one of the finest examples of Palaiologan-era architecture and painting". Among the frescoes is a portrait of the Byzantine emperor Andronikos II Palaiologos (r. 1282–1328). The wooden templon dates to 1840, was constructed by the master carver Demetrios of Metsovo. In the church we can see oldest wooden Byzantine door in the world (11-13 century).

In a 1342 sigillion of Patriarch John XIV Kalekas, the stauropegic status of the monastery is confirmed. A forged chrysobull attributed to Andronikos III Palaiologos concerning the possessions of the monastery contains extensive estates and subsidiary establishments (metochia) as far as Larissa. The monastery amassed great wealth, and was the major spiritual centre of the region, particularly during the 16th and 18th centuries.

== Today ==
Dedicated to the Dormition of the Theotokos, until the 18th century it is recorded also as dedicated to the Transfiguration of the Saviour. The surname Olympiotissa derives from a famed icon of the Panagia, which is believed to have come from a no longer extant monastery at Karya, on the foot of Mount Olympus. Once a year, on 5 October, the icon is borne in a litany from the monastery to the Church of Saint Demetrios.

Originally male, today it is a female monastery, and celebrates on 6 and 15 August. The monastery also features a guest house, library, and a natural history museum.

== See also ==
- Church of Greece
- List of churches in Greece
- List of Greek Orthodox monasteries in Greece
