= History of Thessaly =

The history of Thessaly covers the history of the region of Thessaly in north-central Greece from antiquity to the present day.

== Topography ==
Thessaly is characterized by the large Thessalian plain, formed by the Pineios River, which is surrounded by mountains, most notably the Pindus mountain range to the west, which separates Thessaly from Epirus. Only two passes, the Porta pass and, in the summer, the pass of Metsovo, connect the two regions. From the south, the narrow coastal pass of Thermopylae connects Thessaly with southern Greece. In the north Thessaly borders on Macedonia, either through the coast or the pass of Servia towards Thessalonica, or in the northwest towards western Macedonia.

== Antiquity ==
The first evidence of human habitation in Thessaly dates to the late Paleolithic, but in the early Neolithic this expanded rapidly. Over 400 archaeological sites dating to the period are known, including fortified ones. The most notable of these is at Sesklo. During the Mycenaean period, the main settlement was at Iolcos, as attested in the later legends of Jason and the Argonauts.

=== Archaic period ===
A distinct Thessalian tribal identity and culture first began to form from the 9th century BC on as a mixture of the local population and immigrants from Epirus, first in the region of the Pelasgiotis, with Pherae as its main centre. From there they quickly expanded inland to the plain of the Pineios and towards the Malian Gulf. The Thessalians spoke a distinct form of Aeolic Greek. In the late 7th century BC, the Thessalians conquered the so-called perioikoi. In this process the Thessalians captured Anthela and came to control the local amphictyony. By assuming the former share of the perioikoi in the Delphic Amphictyony, the Thessalians also came to play a leading role in the latter, providing 14 of the 24 hieromnemones and presiding over the Pythian Games. As a result of the First Sacred War (595–585 BC), the Thessalians briefly extended their sway over Phocis as well, but the Boeotians drove them back after the battles of Hyampolis and Ceressus in the mid-6th century.

In the second half of the 7th century, Thessaly became the home of large aristocratic families, controlling huge tracts of land and working them with serfs (penestae), which became a characteristic of Thessaly. The most important were the Aleuadae of Larissa, the Echecratidae of Pharsalus, and the Scopadae of Crannon. Their clan chiefs were often called basileis ("kings"). It was Aleuas Pyrrhos ("the Red") who cemented the aristocracy's predominance by reforming the Thessalian League on the basis of the "tetrads" (quadripartite division), linking it with the noble-controlled kleroi ("land lots") obliged to supply 40 horsemen and 80 infantrymen each. Traditionally, the office of tagus has been regarded as the senior magistrate of the Thessalian League; more recent studies however regard the tagus as a purely local official, and suggest the tetrarches as the head of the League.

=== Classical period ===
Thessaly in Antiquity

In the summer of 480 BC, the Persians invaded Thessaly. The Greek army that guarded the Vale of Tempe evacuated the road before the enemy arrived. Not much later, Thessaly surrendered. The Thessalian family of Aleuadae joined the Persians. In the Peloponnesian War the Thessalians tended to side with Athens and usually prevented Spartan troops from crossing through their territory with the exception of the army of Brasidas. In the 4th century BC Thessaly became dependent on Macedon. In the 2nd century BC, as with the rest of Greece, Thessaly came under the control of the Roman Republic.

=== Roman period ===
From 27 BC it formed part of the Roman province of Achaea, with capital at Corinth. In the reign of Emperor Antoninus Pius (r. 138–161), Thessaly was separated from Achaea and given to the province of Macedonia; eventually it became a separate province. In the new administrative system as it evolved under Diocletian (r. 284–305) and his successors, Thessaly was a separate province within the Diocese of Macedonia, in the praetorian prefecture of Illyricum. With the division of the Roman Empire in 395, Thessaly remained as a part of the East Roman (Byzantine) Empire.

Being far from the Empire's frontiers, and of little strategic importance, Greece lacked any serious fortifications or permanently stationed garrisons, a situation that lasted until the 6th century and led to much devastation by barbarian raids. Thus in 395–397, as most of Greece, Thessaly was occupied by the Visigoths under Alaric, until they were driven out by Stilicho. The Vandals under Geiseric raided the coasts of Greece in the period 466–475, and in 473 the Ostrogoths under Theodemir advanced into Thessaly and captured Larissa before Emperor Leo I gave in and allowed him and his people to settle in Macedonia. Under Theodemir's son, Theodoric the Great, the Ostrogoths once more invaded Thessaly in 482, until they left for Italy in 488. According to the Synecdemus, in the 6th century the province included 16 cities along the capital, Larissa: Demetrias, Phthiotic Thebes, Echinos, Lamia, Hypata, Metropolis, Trikke, Gomphoi, Caesarea, Diocletianopolis, Pharsalus, Saltos Bouramesios, Saltos Iovios, and the islands of Skiathos, Skopelos and Peparisthos.

From the reign of Justin I (r. 518–527) on, attacks on the imperial frontier on the Danube became more and more frequent, and the Balkan provinces were heavily raided, although Greece was less affected. In 539, however, a large Hunnic raid plundered Thessaly and, bypassing the fortified Thermopylae pass, devastated Central Greece. This led to a serious fortification effort under Justinian I (r. 527–565), and the establishment of a permanent garrison at Thermopylae. The area was once more invaded in 558 by the Kotrigurs, but they were stopped at the Thermopylae. Despite the devastation caused by these raids, in Thessaly, and southern Greece in general, the imperial administration seems to have continued to function, and traditional public life to have continued, for much of the century, possibly up to the end of the reign of Justin II (r. 565–578). Nevertheless, the barbarian raids, the two great earthquakes of 522 and 552, and the arrival of the Plague of Justinian in 541–544, led to a drop in population.

== Middle Ages ==
=== Slavic invasions and restoration of Byzantine control ===
The late antique order on Greece was irrevocably shattered with the Slavic incursions that began after 578. The first large-scale raid was in 581, and the Slavs appear to have remained in Greece until 584. Byzantium, confronted by long and bloody wars with Sassanid Persia in the east, and with the Avar Khaganate in the north, was largely unable to stop these raids. After the murder of Emperor Maurice in 602 and the outbreak of the great Byzantine–Sasanian War of 602–628, the Danube frontier, somewhat stabilized under Maurice, collapsed entirely, leaving the Balkans defenceless for the Slavs to raid and settle. The Slavic settlement that followed the raids in the late 6th and early 7th centuries affected the Peloponnese in the south and Macedonia in the north far more than Thessaly or Central Greece, with the fortified towns largely remaining in the hands of the native Greek population. Nevertheless, in the first decades of the 7th century the Slavs were free to raid Thessaly and further south relatively unhindered; according to the Miracles of Saint Demetrius, in c. 615 the Slavic tribes even built monoxyla and raided the coasts of Thessaly and many Aegean islands, depopulating many of them. Five of Thessaly's cities disappear from the sources during the 7th century, and Slavs settled in the northern and northeastern parts of the country. Emperor Constans II (r. 641–668) undertook in 658 the first attempt to restore imperial rule, and although his campaign was mostly carried out in the northern Aegean coast, it seems to have led to a relative pacification of the Slavic tribes in southern Greece as well, at least for a few years. Thus during the great Slavic siege of Thessalonica in c. 676–678 the tribe of the Belegezitai, who according to the Miracles of Saint Demetrius were settled around Demetrias and Phthiotic Thebes, provided the besieged city with grain.

The parts of Thessaly that remained in imperial hands after the Slavic invasions—apparently the Aegean coast and the area around the Pagasetic Gulf—came under the theme of Hellas. This was established between 687 and 695, and comprised the eastern coasts of mainland Greece, and possibly the Peloponnese, as well as Euboea and a few other islands. Its strategos was probably based in (Boeotian) Thebes. Given its lack of depth into the hinterland, the theme was originally probably oriented mostly towards the sea and was of a mostly maritime character, as seen during the anti-iconoclast revolt of 726/7. Some time between 730 and 751, the Church in Thessaly, along with the rest of the Illyricum, were transferred from the jurisdiction of the Pope in Rome to that of the Patriarch of Constantinople.

Like much of northern Greece, Thessaly suffered from raids by the Bulgarians, beginning in 773. At the same time, due to conflict between the Bulgarian ruling class and the Slavic population which led to an exodus from the latter, a second wave of Slavic settlement engulfed Greece from c. 746/7 on. Unlike the first wave of settlement, this does not seem to have disrupted imperial control in the areas where it had been (re-)established. In 783, however, the eunuch minister Staurakios led a large-scale campaign across Greece from Thessalonica to the Peloponnese, subduing the local Slavs and forcing them to acknowledge imperial overlordship. Despite continued raids by the Bulgarians and Saracen pirates—Demetrias was sacked by Damian of Tarsus in 902 and Thessaly and much of Central Greece devastated by Bulgarian raids in 918 and 923–926—Thessaly, and Greece in general, recovered gradually after Byzantine control was firmly re-established, and there are signs of renewed prosperity and economic activity. Especially in Thessaly, this process manifested itself in the appearance of at least nine new cities, including Halmyros and Stagoi, and the resettlement of older ones, such as Zetounion (ancient Lamia).

=== Byzantine rule in the 10th–12th centuries ===
Map of Byzantine Greece in the early 10th century

During the course of the 10th century, the Saracen threat receded and was practically ended as the result of the Byzantine reconquest of Crete in 960–961. The threat from Bulgaria remained, however, and in 986, during his wars with Basil II (r. 976–1025), the Bulgarian tsar Samuel sacked the city of Larissa and occupied Thessaly. The Bulgarian ruler undertook another large-scale expedition through the province and into the Peloponnese in 997, but on his return he suffered a devastating defeat at the Battle of Spercheios. In the early 11th century, Thessaly was separated from Hellas and joined to the theme of Thessalonica. The Spercheios valley however remained part of Hellas, with the new border running along the Othrys–Agrafa line. The region enjoyed a long period of peace at this time, interrupted only by raids during the uprising of Petar Delyan (1040–1041), plundering by the Uzès in 1064, and the brief Norman attack into Thessaly in 1082–1083, which was beaten back by Emperor Alexios I Komnenos (r. 1081–1118). The Vlachs are first mentioned in Thessaly during the 11th century, in the Strategikon of Kekaumenos and Anna Komnene's Alexiad. In the 12th century, the Jewish traveler Benjamin of Tudela recorded the existence of the district of "Vlachia" near Halmyros, while the Byzantine historian Niketas Choniates placed a "Great Vlachia" near Meteora. The term is also used by the 13th-century scholar George Pachymeres, and it appears as a distinct administrative unit in 1276, when the pinkernes Raoul Komnenos was its governor (kephale). Thessalian Vlachia was apparently also known as "Vlachia in Hellas".

In the aftermath of the failed Norman invasion, Alexios I granted the first trading privileges to the Republic of Venice, including immunity from taxation and the right to establish trade colonies in certain towns; in Thessaly, this was Demetrias. These concessions signalled the beginning of the ascendancy of the Italian maritime republics in maritime commerce and their gradual takeover of the Byzantine economy. Alexios' successors tried to curb these privileges with mixed success, but in 1198 Alexios III Angelos (r. 1195–1203) was forced to concede even more extensive ones, allowing the Venetians to create trade stations at Vlachia, the "two Halmyroi", Grebenikon, Pharsalus, Domokos, Vesaina, Ezeros, Dobrochouvista, Trikala, Larissa, and Platamon.

Sometime in the 12th century, Thessaly reverted to Hellas, with the exception of the northwestern portion around Stagoi and Trikala, which was included in the new theme of Servia. Benjamin of Tudela, who visited the area in 1165, also recorded the presence of Jewish communities at Halmyros, Zetounion, Vesaina, and Gardiki. Both Benjamin and the Arab geographer al-Idrisi describe Greece during the middle of the 12th century as densely populated and prosperous. The situation began to change towards the end of the reign of Manuel I Komnenos (r. 1143–1180), whose costly military ventures led to a hike in taxation. Coupled with the corruption and autocratic behaviour of officials, this led to a decline in industry and the impoverishment of the peasantry, eloquently lamented by the Metropolitan of Athens, Michael Choniates. This decline was temporarily halted under Andronikos I Komnenos (r. 1182–1185), who sent the capable Nikephoros Prosouch as governor to Greece, but resumed after Andronikos' fall. In 1199–1201 Manuel Kamytzes, the rebellious son-in-law of Byzantine emperor Alexios III Angelos (r. 1195–1203), with the support of Dobromir Chrysos, the autonomous ruler of Prosek, established a short-lived principality in northern Thessaly, before he was overcome by an imperial expedition.

By the end of the 12th century, the theme of Hellas had been superseded by a collection of smaller districts variously termed horia (sing. horion), chartoularata (sing. chartoularaton), and episkepseis (sing. episkepsis). This division is reflected in the 1198 chrysobull of Alexios III to the Venetians, and in the Partitio Romaniae of 1204. These documents mention the episkepseis (domains of the imperial family) of Platamon, Demetrias, the "two Halmyroi", Krevennika and Pharsalus, Domokos and Vesaina, the horion of Larissa and the "provinces" of Vlachia, Servia, and Velechativa, and the chartoularata of Dobrochouvista and Ezeros (Sthlanitsa in the Partitio), the latter evidently Slavic settlements.

=== Latin and Epirote rule ===
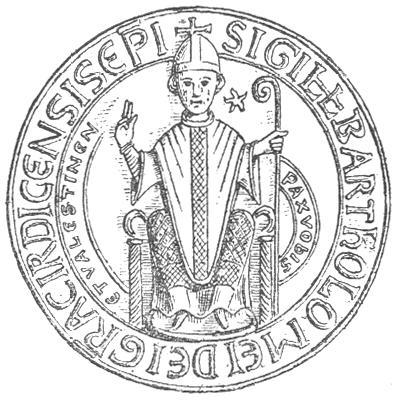
Seal of Bartholomew, Latin Bishop of Karditsa and Velestino in 1208–1214

Following the sack of Constantinople and the dissolution of the Byzantine Empire by the Fourth Crusade in April 1204, Leo Sgouros, the Greek ruler of Nauplia, marched into central Greece. At Larissa he met the deposed Alexios III, and concluded a marriage alliance with him. Both were soon confronted by the Crusaders under Boniface of Montferrat, who sought to expand his newly established Kingdom of Thessalonica into southern Greece. Unable to challenge the Crusaders in open battle, Sgouros gave up Thessaly without a fight, and withdrew to his bases in the Peloponnese. Boniface divided the captured lands among his followers: Platamon went to Rolando Piscia, Larissa and Halmyros to the Lombard Guglielmo, and Velestino to Berthold of Katzenellenbogen, while further south in Central Greece Bodonitza went to Guido Pallavicini, Gravia to Jacques de Saint Omer, Salona to Thomas d'Autremencourt, Thebes to the brothers Albertino and Rolando Canossa, Athens to Othon de la Roche, and Euboea (Negroponte) to Jacques d'Avesnes. The boundaries of the actual Kingdom of Thessalonica seem to have extended only up to Domokos, Pharsalus, and Velestino: the Spercheios valley in southern Thessaly, with the towns of Zetounion and Ravennika, was under governors appointed by the Latin Emperor.

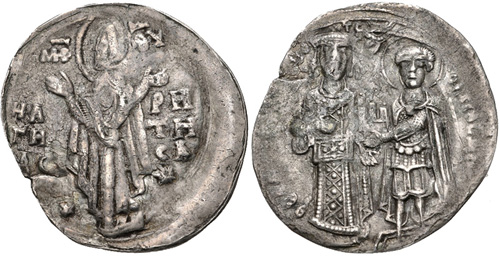
Billon trachy coin of Theodore Komnenos Doukas as Emperor of Thessalonica

In 1212, however, Michael I Komnenos Doukas (r. 1205–1214/5), ruler of the independent Greek state of Epirus, led his troops into Thessaly, overrunning the resistance of the local Lombard nobles. Larissa and much of central Thessaly came under Epirote rule, thereby separating Thessalonica from the Crusader principalities in southern Greece. Michael's work was completed by his half-brother and successor, Theodore Komnenos Doukas (r. 1215–1230), who by c. 1222/3 completed the recovery of the entire region except for Halmyros, which remained in Latin hands until 1246. Eventually, in December 1224, Theodore conquered Thessalonica as well. Soon thereafter he declared himself emperor, founding the Empire of Thessalonica. The region remained attached to Thessalonica until 1239, when the deposed ruler of Thessalonica Manuel Komnenos Doukas captured it from his nephew John Komnenos Doukas and secured its status as a separate section of the family holdings. Upon his death in 1241, the area quickly, and apparently without resistance, came under the control of the ruler of Epirus, Michael II Komnenos Doukas (r. 1230–1268). Following the Battle of Pelagonia in 1259, Thessaly was occupied by the Empire of Nicaea, but an Epirote counter-offensive in spring 1260 under Nikephoros I Komnenos Doukas defeated the Nicaean general Alexios Strategopoulos and recovered most of the province, except perhaps for part of the Aegean coast around Volos, which possibly remained in Nicaean hands for several years thereafter.

=== Thessaly as an autonomous principality ===
On the death of Michael II in 1267/8, his dominions were divided between Nikephoros, who received Epirus proper, and Michael's illegitimate son John Doukas (r. 1267/8–1289), who was married to a Thessalian Vlach princess, received Thessaly. Although separated politically, Thessaly continued to share many similarities with the parent state of Epirus: both were reluctant to acknowledge the revived Palaiologos-led Byzantine Empire and its imperial pretensions, both established close ties with the Latin states of southern Greece in an attempt to maintain their independence, while at the same time being threatened by them and forced to cede territory to them. Both were eventually reunified under the Byzantines in the 1330s and the Serbians shortly after.

Map of the Greek and Latin states in southern Greece c. 1278

From his capital at Neopatras, John I Doukas governed Thessaly as a virtually independent state. (Note: This state is frequently, but inaccurately, called "Great Wallachia" or "Duchy of Neopatras" in older scholarly literature. Both titles arise from contemporary usage by Western authors, who extended the use of the term "[Great] Vlachia" to the entirety of the realm governed by John Doukas and his heirs, and confused John's family name of Doukas with the title of "duke" (both ultimately deriving from Latin dux).) Although he recognized the suzerainty of the Byzantine emperor Michael VIII Palaiologos (r. 1259–1282), receiving the title of sebastokrator in exchange, John I Doukas maintained a consistent anti-Palaiologan stance. In this conflict he allied himself with Latin powers, namely Charles of Anjou and the Duchy of Athens. Michael VIII's attempts to form a union of the Orthodox and Catholic Churches, culminating in the Second Council of Lyon in 1274, were another point of friction. John portrayed himself as a champion of Orthodoxy, offering refuge to pro-Unionists and convoking a synod at his capital Neopatras in 1276/7 to condemn the Union. Sometime in 1273–75 (the date is disputed by scholars) Michael VIII dispatched a large army against John under his own brother, John Palaiologos. The Byzantine army advanced rapidly through Thessaly and blockaded John with a few of his men at Neopatras, which was placed under siege. John managed to evade the Byzantines and secure aid from Athens, with which he routed the Byzantine army at the Battle of Neopatras. In exchange for this aid, however, John gave his daughter Helena to the future Duke of Athens William de la Roche (r. 1280–1287), with the towns of Zetounion, Gardiki, Gravia, and Siderokastron as a dowry. In addition, the fleeing Byzantine troops were able to reach Demetrias and help their fleet secure a devastating victory against the Lombard lords of Euboea. A further Byzantine expedition in 1277 against John was equally unsuccessful. Finally, in 1282 Michael VIII in person campaigned against John, but fell ill and died on the way.

Nevertheless, after John's death, his widow was compelled to recognize the suzerainty of Michael VIII's successor, Andronikos II Palaiologos (r. 1282–1328) to safeguard the position of her underage sons Constantine and Theodore. Thus the Byzantines were allowed passage through Thessaly to invade Epirus in 1290, but soon after the two princes started conspiring with the Serbians of King Milutin against Byzantium. In 1295 the brothers invaded Epirus themselves and seized Naupaktos, but no further gains appear to have been made. Both Constantine and Theodore died in 1303, leaving Thessaly to the young son of Constantine, John II Doukas. As he too was underage, Constantine had named the Duke of Athens, Guy II de la Roche (r. 1287–1308), as his regent and guardian. John II continued his grandfather's pro-Latin policy, maintaining particularly close relations with the Venetians, who imported agricultural produce from Thessaly.

In 1308, Guy II de la Roche died. John II Doukas seized the opportunity to sever his dependency on Athens, and turned to Byzantium for support. In early 1309, the Catalan Company, in conflict with the Byzantines, crossed from Macedonia into Thessaly. The arrival of the marauding Company, some 8,000 strong, alarmed John II Doukas. Defeated by the Greeks, the Catalans agreed to pass peacefully through Thessaly to the south, towards the Frankish principalities of southern Greece. After seizing the Spercheios Valley and capturing Salona, the new Duke of Athens, Walter of Brienne, hired the Company for service against Thessaly. Turning back, the Catalans captured Zetounion, Halmyros, Domokos and some thirty other fortresses, and plundered the rich plain of Thessaly, forcing the John Doukas to come to terms with Walter. Walter however tried to backtrack on his deal with the Catalans, leading to open conflict. In the Battle of Halmyros on 15 March 1311, the Catalans crushed the Athenian army, killing Walter and most of the leading nobles of Frankish Greece. After the battle, the Catalan Company proceeded to occupy the defenceless duchy.

=== Thessaly in the 14th and 15th centuries ===
Coat of arms of the Duchy of Neopatras.

The Catalans continued for a while to hold the parts of southern Thessaly they had occupied and raided the region in the following years, while John Doukas' authority was increasingly enfeebled in Thessaly itself at the expense of the large landholders, who became virtually autonomous, maintaining their own, independent contacts with the Byzantine court. As a result, probably c. 1315, John too was forced to formalize his relations with the Byzantines, recognizing the Empire's suzerainty and marrying Irene Palaiologina, the illegitimate daughter of Emperor Andronikos II Palaiologos. When John Doukas died in 1318, the southern part of Thessaly was quickly captured by the Catalans of Athens. Between 1318 and 1325, the Catalans took Neopatras, Zetounion, Loidoriki, Siderokastron, and Vitrinitsa, as well as—apparently briefly—Domokos, Gardiki, and Pharsalus. This territory formed the new, Catalan-dominated Duchy of Neopatras. Venice also took advantage of the anarchy in Thessaly to acquire the port of Pteleos. The central and northern part of Thessaly remained in Greek hands. Lacking a central authority, however, the area fractured among competing rulers. The north came under control of the Byzantines from Thessalonica, while in the centre three rival magnates, Stephen Gabrielopoulos of Trikala, a certain Signorinos, and the Melissenos, or rather Maliasenos, family in the east around Volos, emerged. Gabrielopoulos was the most successful of the three, and soon managed to gain recognition of his rule by the Byzantine court, which granted him the title of sebastokrator. The Maliasenoi on the other hand seem to have turned to the Catalans for support. With the loss of Neopatras and the rise of Gabrielopoulos, Trikala became the new political centre of Thessaly. At about the same time, larger groups of Albanians, such as the tribes of the Malakasioi, Bouoi, and Mesaritai, began to raid and settle in Thessaly, although smaller groups of Albanians may have been present in the region already from the late 12th century.

When Gabrielopoulos died in c. 1333, the Epirote ruler John II Orsini (r. 1323–1335) tried to take advantage of the situation and seize his lands, but the Byzantines under Andronikos III Palaiologos (r. 1328–1341) moved in and established direct control over the northern and western part of the region. Andronikos himself made agreements with the transhumant Albanian tribesmen of the Pindus mountains and appointed Michael Monomachos as governor of the region. It is unclear over which parts of Thessaly Byzantine control was restored: John Kantakouzenos claims that the campaign restored the old Epirote–Thessalian border (i.e. the Pindus mountains), while the modern researcher Božidar Ferjančić suggests that the Byzantines recovered eastern and central Thessaly, but that the western part remained under Epirote rule until Orsini's death three years later, when this area too came under Byzantine control.

The successful Byzantine reconquest was led by Andronikos III's friend and chief aide, John Kantakouzenos. Thus when the Byzantine civil war of 1341–47 broke out between Kantakouzenos and the regency for the underage John V Palaiologos, Thessaly and Epirus quickly rallied to his side. Kantakouzenos' cousin, John Angelos, ruled the two regions until his death in 1348, whereupon they fell to the expanding Serbian Empire of Stefan Dushan. Dushan appointed his general Gregory Preljub as governor of Thessaly, which he ruled, probably from Trikala, until his death in late 1355 or early 1356. In 1350, Kantakouzenos, now emperor, launched an attempt to reconquer Thessaly, but after capturing the towns of Lykostomion and Kastrion, he faltered before Servia, which was defended by Preljub himself. Kantakouzenos withdrew, and Lykostomion and Kastrion were recovered by the Serbs soon after. Preljub's rule is otherwise obscure, except for his reaching an agreement with the local Albanian tribes; an agreement that probably did not last long, for he was killed in a clash with them.

The death of Preljub was preceded by that of Dushan himself, leaving a power vacuum in the wider Serbian Empire and in Thessaly in particular. In this context, Nikephoros Orsini, the exiled son of John II Orsini, who had entered Byzantine service, tried to realize his ancestral claims over the region. From Ainos, he sailed to Thessaly, which he captured quickly, expelling Preljub's wife and son. He then conquered Aetolia, Acarnania, and Leukas. Catalan control over southern Thessaly had ceased by this time. Nikephoros came into conflict with the Albanians, however, and was killed in the Battle of Achelous in 1359. Following Nikephoros' death, Thessaly was taken over without resistance by Dushan's half-brother Simeon Uroš. Enjoying the support of the local Greek and Serbian nobility, Simeon Uroš reigned as self-proclaimed emperor from Trikala until his death in 1370. He was particularly noted as a patron of the Meteora monasteries, who regarded him as their "second founder". His son John Uroš succeeded him until 1373, when he retired to a monastery; Thessaly was then ruled by Alexios Angelos Philanthropenos and (from c. 1388) Manuel Angelos Philanthropenos, who recognized Byzantine suzerainty until c. 1393, when the region was conquered by the Ottoman Empire. In the south, the Florentine adventurer Nerio Acciaioli had managed to take over the Duchy of Athens from the Catalans, and in 1390 captured Neopatras as well. These territories were soon lost to the Ottoman Turks, at about the same time as the fall of Thessaly.

== Ottoman period ==
Ottoman Greece in the early 19th century

The Ottomans first invaded Thessaly in 1386, when Gazi Evrenos captured Larissa for a time, confining the Angeloi Philanthropenoi to their holdings in western Thessaly, around Trikala. In ca. 1393, the second phase of the invasion began, again under Evrenos. The Ottomans defeated Manuel Angelos Philanthropenos, and reconquered Larissa. The conquest of Thessaly was completed during the next few years, from 1394 on under the personal supervision of Sultan Bayezid I. The fortresses of Volos, Pharsalus, Domokos and Neopatras were taken, and in 1395/6, Trikala too fell.

After the disastrous Battle of Ankara in 1402, the weakened Ottomans were forced to return the eastern coasts of Thessaly and the region of Zetounion to Byzantine rule. In 1423, renewed Ottoman pressure forced the local Byzantine commander to surrender the forts of Stylida and Avlaki to the Venetians. By 1444, the entire region had been finally conquered by the Turks. Pteleos alone remained in Venetian hands until 1470.

The newly conquered region was initially the patrimonial domain of the powerful marcher-lord Turahan Bey (died 1456) and of his son Ömer Bey (died 1484) rather than a regular province. Turahan and his heirs brought in settlers from Anatolia (the so-called "Konyalis" or "Koniarides" since most were from the region around Konya) to repopulate the sparsely inhabited area, and soon, Muslim settlers or converts dominated the lowlands, while the Christians held the mountains around the Thessalian plain. The area was generally peaceful, but banditry was endemic, and led to the creation of the first state-sanctioned Christian autonomies known as armatoliks, the earliest and most notable of which was that of Agrafa. Failed Greek uprisings occurred in 1600/1 and 1612, and during the Morean War (1684–1699) and the Orlov Revolt (1770).

After 1780, the ambitious Ali Pasha of Ioannina took over control of Thessaly, and consolidated his rule after 1808, when he suppressed a local uprising. His heavy taxation, however, ruined the province's commerce, and coupled with the outbreak of the plague in 1813, reduced the population to some 200,000 by 1820. When the Greek War of Independence broke out in 1821, Greek risings occurred in the Pelion and Olympus mountains as well as the western mountains around Fanari, but they were swiftly suppressed by the Ottoman armies under Mehmed Reshid Pasha and Mahmud Dramali Pasha. After the establishment of the independent Kingdom of Greece, Greek nationalist agitation continued, with further revolts in 1841, in 1854 during the Crimean War, and again during the Russo-Turkish War of 1877–1878. The uprising in the period of 1878 resulted simultaneously with other unrest, but despite this, the Ottoman government quickly and decisively suppressed it after the battle of Mount Pelion. Thessaly remained in Ottoman hands until 1881, when it was handed over to Greece under the terms of the Convention of Constantinople.

== Modern era ==
After union with Greece, Thessaly became divided into four prefectures: Larissa Prefecture, Magnesia Prefecture, Karditsa Prefecture, and Trikala Prefecture. In 1897, the region was overrun by the Ottomans during the brief Greco-Turkish War of 1897. The Ottoman army withdrew after the war's end, but minor territorial adjustments were made to the frontier in the Ottomans' favour. The early decades of Greek rule in Thessaly were dominated by the agricultural issue, as the area retained its Ottoman-era large landholdings (chifliks), and the landlords enjoyed great influence, essentially reducing their tenant farmers to serfdom. The tensions culminated in the Kileler uprising of March 1910. The problem was finally settled through the wide-ranging land redistribution campaign undertaken by the governments of Eleftherios Venizelos.

During World War I, during the National Schism in 1916–17, Thessaly served as a buffer zone between the pro-Entente Provisional Government of National Defence, led by Venizelos in Thessaloniki, and the royal, pro-Central Powers government in Athens. During World War II the area was occupied by the Italian army in 1941–43, and by the Germans in 1943–44. It became a major centre of the Greek Resistance, most famously seeing the desertion of the Italian Pinerolo Division to the guerrillas of EAM-ELAS in 1943.

== Sources ==
- Beck, Hans (2006). "Thessali, Thessalia". Brill's New Pauly. doi:10.1163/1574-9347_bnp_e1210930. ISBN 978-9004122598 – via Brill Online.
- Fine, John V. A. Jr. (1991) [1983]. The Early Medieval Balkans: A Critical Survey from the Sixth to the Late Twelfth Century. Ann Arbor: University of Michigan Press. ISBN 0-472-08149-7.
- Fine, John V. A. Jr. (1994) [1987]. The Late Medieval Balkans: A Critical Survey from the Late Twelfth Century to the Ottoman Conquest. Ann Arbor, Michigan: University of Michigan Press. ISBN 978-0-472-10079-8. OCLC 749133662.
- Ferjančić, Božidar (1974). Тесалија у XIII и XIV веку [Thessaly in the 13th and 14th Centuries] (in Serbian). Belgrade: Византолошког институт САНУ.
- Geanakoplos, Deno John (1959). Emperor Michael Palaeologus and the West, 1258–1282: A Study in Byzantine-Latin Relations. Cambridge, Massachusetts: Harvard University Press. OCLC 1011763434.
- Heurtley, W. A.; Darby, H. C.; Crawley, C. W.; Woodhouse, C. M. (1967) [1965]. A Short History of Greece: From Early Times to 1964. Cambridge: Cambridge University Press. ISBN 9780521094542.
- Kazhdan, Alexander, ed. (1991). The Oxford Dictionary of Byzantium. Oxford and New York: Oxford University Press. ISBN 0-19-504652-8.
- Koder, Johannes; Hild, Friedrich (1976). Tabula Imperii Byzantini, Band 1: Hellas und Thessalia (in German). Vienna: Verlag der Österreichischen Akademie der Wissenschaften. ISBN 978-3-7001-0182-6.
- Magdalino, Paul (1989). "Between Romaniae: Thessaly and Epirus in the Later Middle Ages". In Arbel, Benjamin; Hamilton, Bernhard; Jacoby, David (eds.). Latins and Greeks in the Eastern Mediterranean After 1204. Frank Cass & Co. pp. 87–110. ISBN 0-71463372-0.
- Miller, William (1908). The Latins in the Levant: A History of Frankish Greece (1204–1566). London: John Murray. OCLC 563022439.
- Naval Intelligence Division (1944). Greece: Physical Geography, History, Administration and Peoples. Geographical handbook Series BR 516. London: Naval Intelligence Division.
- Nicol, Donald M. (1993). The Last Centuries of Byzantium, 1261–1453 (Second ed.). Cambridge: Cambridge University Press. ISBN 978-0-521-43991-6.
- Nicol, Donald MacGillivray (2010). The Despotate of Epiros 1267–1479: A Contribution to the History of Greece in the Middle Ages. Cambridge University Press. ISBN 978-0-521-13089-9.
- Polemis, Demetrios I. (1968). The Doukai: A Contribution to Byzantine Prosopography. London: The Athlone Press.
- Savvides, Alexis G. C. (1998). "Splintered Medieval Hellenism: The Semi-Autonomous State of Thessaly (A.D. 1213/1222 to 1454/1470) and its Place in History". Byzantion. 68: 406–418.
- Savvides, Alexis G. C. (2000). "Tesalya". In Bearman, P. J.; Bianquis, Th.; Bosworth, C. E.; van Donzel, E. & Heinrichs, W. P. (eds.). The Encyclopaedia of Islam, Second Edition. Volume X: T–U. Leiden: E. J. Brill. pp. 420–422. ISBN 978-90-04-11211-7.
- Soulis, George C. (1963). "Thessalian Vlachia". Zbornik Radova Vizantološkog Instituta. 8 (1): 271–273.
- Soulis, George C. (1984). The Serbs and Byzantium during the reign of Emperor Stephen Dušan (1331–1355) and his successors. Dumbarton Oaks. ISBN 0-88402-137-8.
- Treadgold, Warren (1997). A History of the Byzantine State and Society. Stanford, California: Stanford University Press. ISBN 0-8047-2630-2.
- Van Tricht, Filip (2011). The Latin Renovatio of Byzantium: The Empire of Constantinople (1204–1228). Leiden: Brill. ISBN 978-90-04-20323-5.
- Yerolimpos, Alexandra (2000). "Tirḥāla". In Bearman, P. J.; Bianquis, Th.; Bosworth, C. E.; van Donzel, E. & Heinrichs, W. P. (eds.). The Encyclopaedia of Islam, Second Edition. Volume X: T–U. Leiden: E. J. Brill. pp. 539–540. ISBN 978-90-04-11211-7.
