= Porta Panagia =

Byzantine church in Pyli, Greece

Coordinates: 39.459928°N 21.609841°E

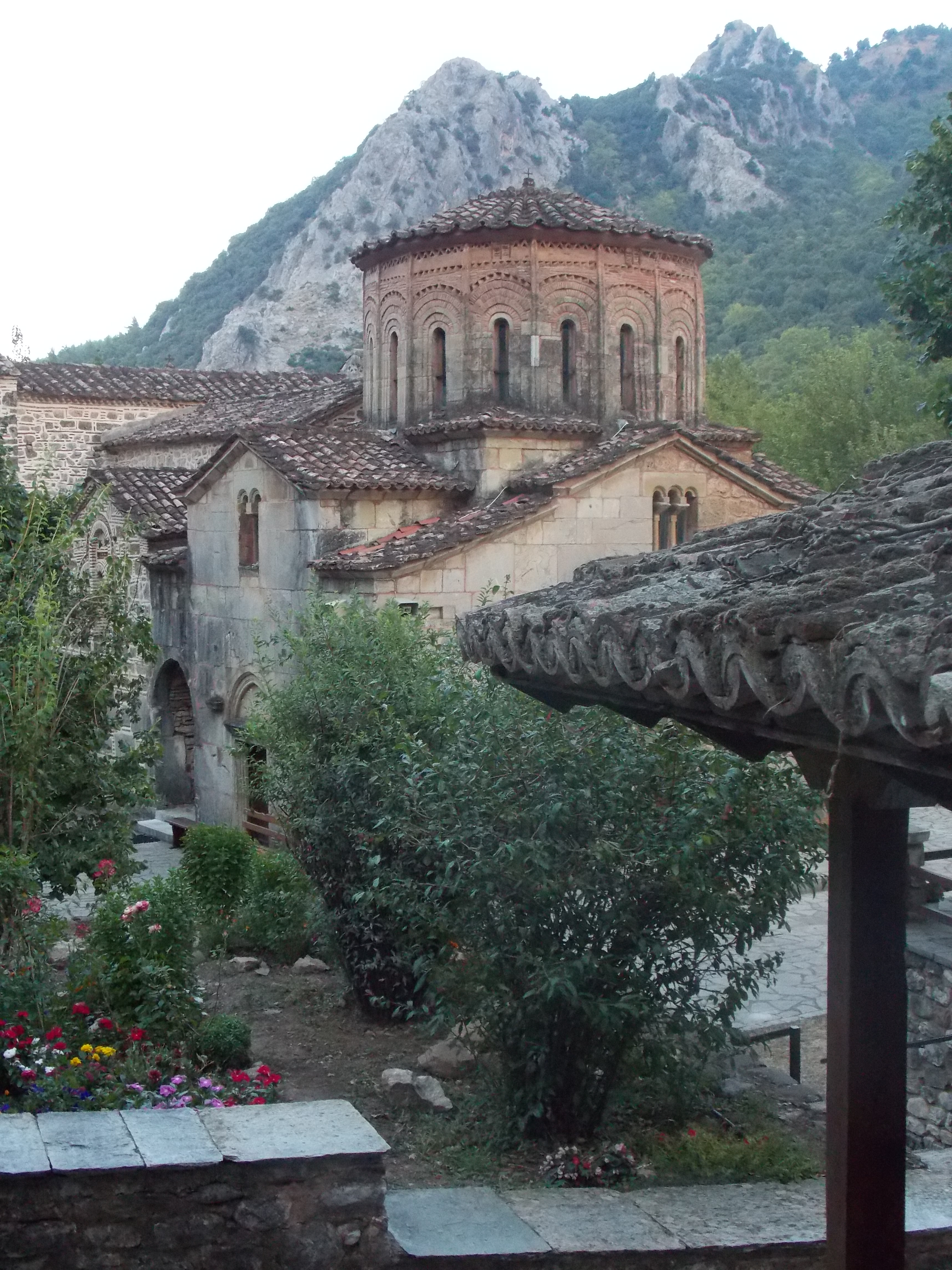
Porta Panagia

The church of Porta Panagia (Greek: Πόρτα-Παναγιά), full name Panagia tis Portas (Παναγία της Πόρτας, "Panagia of Porta"), is a Byzantine-era church near the town of Pyli, in the Trikala Prefecture in Greece.

== Location and history ==
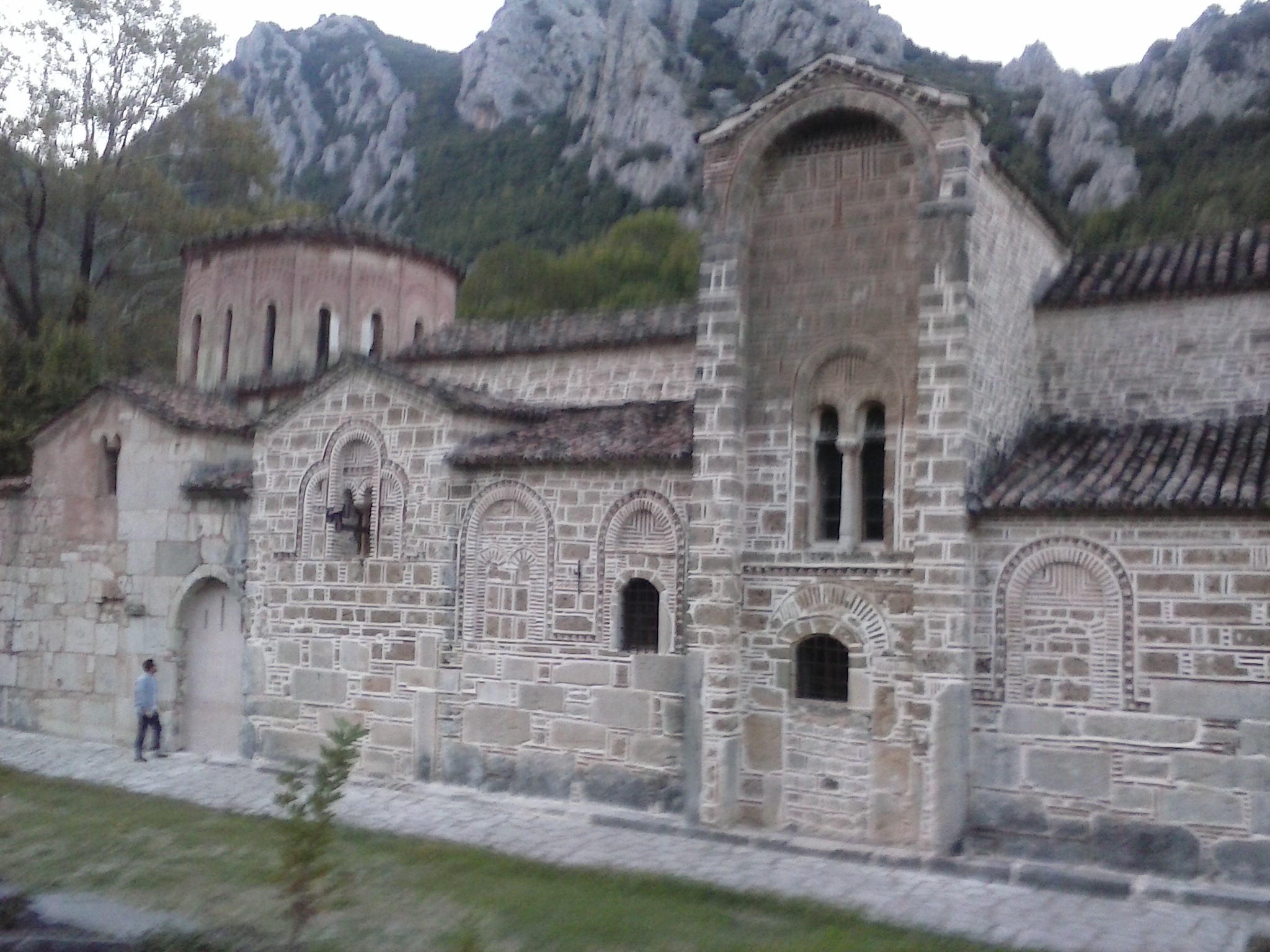
Close view

The church is located on the northern bank of the Portaikos river, in the ruins of the old settlement of Megale Porta (Μεγάλη Πόρτα) or Megalai Pylai (Μεγάλαι Πύλαι), which was razed by the Ottomans in 1822. The modern town of Pyli, formerly Porta, is nearby. The names for both the former and the current settlement mean "door" or "gate" in Greek, and derive from the nearby namesake pass that forms an entrance to the Pindus Mountains.

The church, dedicated to the Dormition of the Theotokos, was originally the katholikon of a stauropegic monastery dedicated to the "Unconquerable Panagia" (Παναγία Ακαταμάχητος, Panagia Akatamachetos), founded in 1283 by the ruler of Thessaly, the sebastokrator John I Doukas. An ancient temple was located on the site previously, with some column remnants surviving outside the exonarthex. The monastery's extensive possessions in the region were confirmed by the Byzantine emperors Andronikos II Palaiologos and Andronikos III Palaiologos, including the metochia of St. Athanasios in Fanari, of St. Nicholas in Lykousada, an unidentified St. Demetrius, the SS. Theodores tou Kyrou Pavlou, the Theotokos Monastery in Mavrovouni, the metochi of Theotokos in the castle of Fanari, and the Theotokos Monastery known as Boxista. The original village of Megale Porta was also celebrated as the birthplace of Saint Bessarion, Metropolitan of Larissa. The church is the only surviving structure of the old monastery. It passed under the jurisdiction of the nearby Dousikou Monastery in 1843, while continuing to function as the parish church for the village of Porta.

The church is accessible by road and open to visitors free of charge.

== Description ==
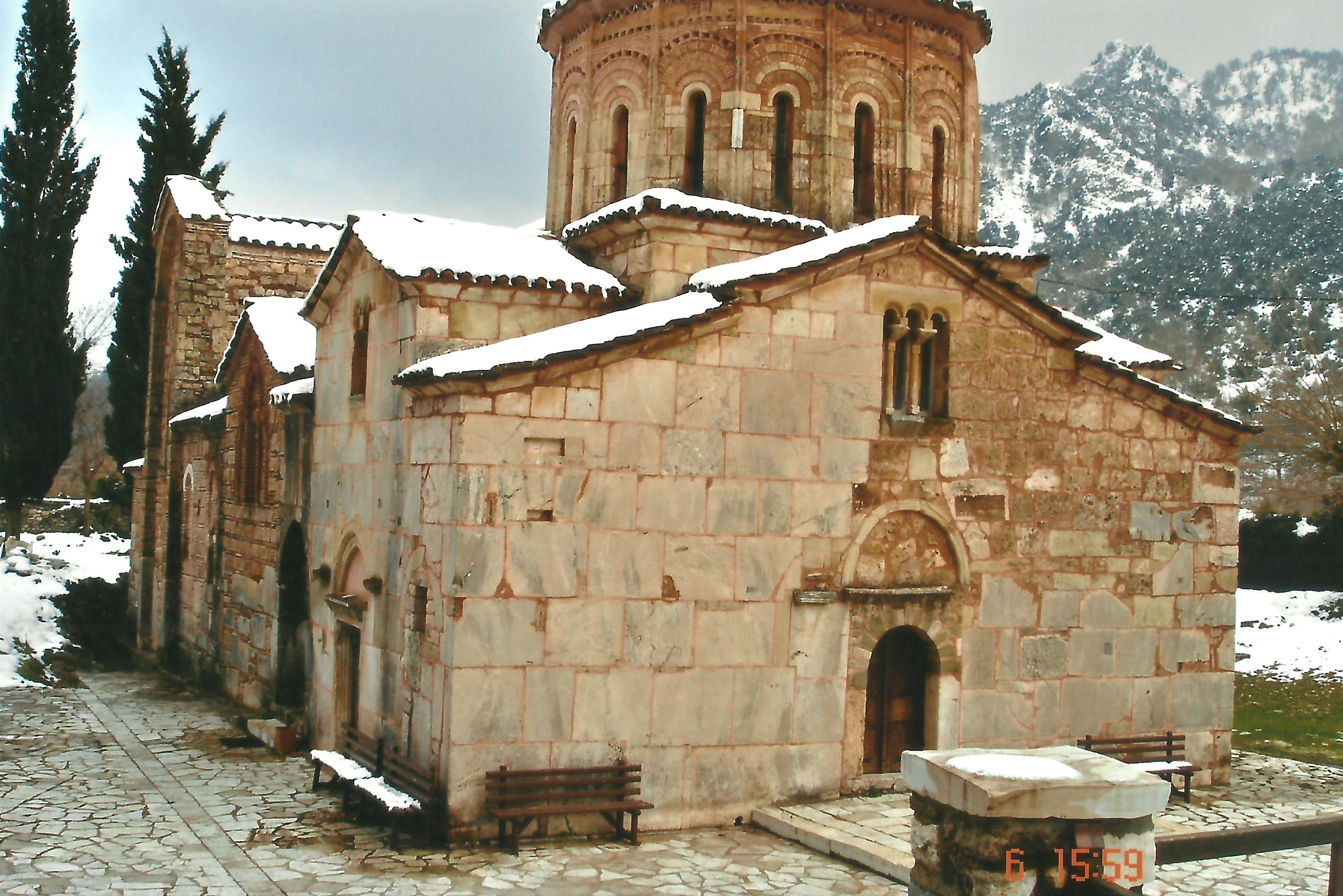
The exonarthex of the church

The church is composed of the main church and the later exonarthex. The main church is a three-aisled basilica with a cross roof formed by a vertical transept in the main aisle. The side-aisles are considerably lower and are separated from the central aisle by columns supporting six arches. To the east the church features three three-sided apses. The walls of the church to the height of 2 m are built of large limestone ashlar blocks, some of which have been arranged to form crosses, while the remainder was built in the typically Byzantine enclosed brick system (square stones with bricks around). The external walls feature ceramic decorations in the form of jagged bands, meanders, crosses, etc. The windows are double- or triple-arched, and feature ceramic decorations. The exonarthex, which was added in the late 14th century, is of the cross-in-square type, with four small corner niches. The structure was largely built with reused material. The monastery's founder, John Doukas, was buried before the south wall of the church; a fresco above his tomb shows him "as a monk being presented by an angel to the enthroned Virgin".

Most of the original interior decoration was destroyed in a fire in 1855. The marble templon survived, and was restored and slightly altered by the archaeologist Anastasios Orlandos. The two eastern pessaries feature mosaics with full-length depictions of Jesus Christ and the Theotokos Brephokratousa.

== Sources ==
- Constantinides, Efthalia C. (1992). The Wall Paintings of the Panagia Olympiotissa at Elasson in Northern Thessaly. Canadian Archaeological Institute at Athens.
- Koder, Johannes; Hild, Friedrich (1976). Tabula Imperii Byzantini, Band 1: Hellas und Thessalia (in German). Vienna: Verlag der Österreichischen Akademie der Wissenschaften. ISBN 978-3-7001-0182-6.
