= Constantine Doukas of Thessaly =

Ruler of Thessaly (died 1303)

Constantine Doukas
- Sebastokrator

Ruler of Thessaly or Great Vlachia
- Reign: c. 1289–1303
- Predecessor: John I Doukas
- Successor: John II Doukas
- Died: 1303
- Issue: John II Doukas
- Dynasty: Komnenodoukai
- Father: John I Doukas
- Mother: Hypomone

Constantine Doukas (Greek: Κωνσταντίνος Δούκας, romanized: Kōnstantinos Doukas), Latinized as Ducas, was ruler of Thessaly from c. 1289 to his death in 1303.

== Life ==
Constantine Doukas was the second son of John I Doukas of Thessaly by his wife, who is only known by her monastic name Hypomone ("Patience"). He succeeded his father sometime in or before 1289 as ruler of Thessaly until his death in 1303. From c. 1295 on he bore the title of sebastokrator. At the beginning of his reign, as he was underage, he stood under the regency of Anna Palaiologina Kantakouzene. His younger brother Theodore Angelos was his co-ruler until his own death in ca. 1299.

Early in his reign, Constantine's mother entered into negotiations with the Byzantine Empire and, in exchange for recognizing nominal Byzantine suzerainty, Constantine was invested with the title of sebastokratōr. Constantine continued his father's war against Nikephoros I Komnenos Doukas of Epirus and his Angevin allies. The campaign of 1295 resulted in Thessalian occupation of the fortresses that Nikephoros had designated as the dowry of his daughter Thamar Angelina Komnene when she married Philip I of Taranto, son of King Charles II of Naples and Maria of Hungary. Most of these conquests were lost to the Angevins in 1296, when a truce was signed. Further fighting followed in 1301, and Angelokastron in Aetolia-Acarnania had to be returned to Philip of Taranto. Virtually nothing else is known about the reign of Constantine, who died in 1303.

== Family ==
His wife is unknown; Karl Hopf reported that she was called Anna Evagionissa, and that she outlived Constantine, dying in 1317. The couple had at least one child, John II Doukas, who succeeded as ruler of Thessaly.

== Sources ==
- Ferjančić, Božidar (1974). Тесалија у XIII и XIV веку [Thessaly in the 13th and 14th Centuries] (in Serbian). Belgrade: Византолошког институт САНУ.
- Fine, John V. A. (1994) [1987]. The Late Medieval Balkans: A Critical Survey from the Late Twelfth Century to the Ottoman Conquest. Ann Arbor, Michigan: University of Michigan Press. ISBN 978-0-472-10079-8.
- Polemis, Demetrios I. (1968). The Doukai: A Contribution to Byzantine Prosopography. London: The Athlone Press.
- Trapp, Erich; Beyer, Hans-Veit; Walther, Rainer; Sturm-Schnabl, Katja; Kislinger, Ewald; Leontiadis, Ioannis; Kaplaneres, Sokrates (1976–1996). Prosopographisches Lexikon der Palaiologenzeit (in German). Vienna: Verlag der Österreichischen Akademie der Wissenschaften. ISBN 3-7001-3003-1.

Preceded by John I Doukas	Ruler of Thessaly c. 1289–1303; With: Theodore Angelos (until 1299)	Succeeded by John II Doukas
