= Michael Monomachos =

Michael Senachereim Monomachos
- Died: between 1343 and 1346
- Military career
- Allegiance: Byzantine Empire
- Service years: before 1315 – after 1343
- Rank: megas konostaulos
- Wars: Byzantine civil war of 1321–1328, Byzantine conquest of Thessaly and Epirus (1330s), Byzantine civil war of 1341–1347

Michael Senachereim Monomachos (Greek: Μιχαὴλ Σεναχηρείμ Μονομάχος; fl. 1315–1343/46) was a high-ranking Byzantine official, who served as governor of Thessalonica and Thessaly. He reached the high rank of megas konostaulos.

== Life ==
Michael and his brother, George Atouemes Monomachos, were scions of the Monomachos family, an aristocratic lineage that stretched back to the 10th century. Their exact relation to other early 14th-century members of the family is unknown, and they are among the last attested members of the family in Byzantine times.

Michael is mentioned for the first time in 1315, when he served as governor (kephale) of Thessalonica. He continued in the same office in 1321, when he is recorded as tatas tes aules, and in 1327, when he was eparchos. In the civil war of 1321–28, he supported Andronikos II Palaiologos against his grandson, Andronikos III.

Monomachos remained in Thessalonica until 1332/3. In that year, Stephen Gabrielopoulos, the semi-independent ruler of western Thessaly and parts of southwestern Macedonia, died. Gabrielopoulos had been a Byzantine vassal, but the neighbouring ruler of Epirus, John II Orsini, quickly moved to take over his territories. In response, Andronikos III ordered Monomachos in Thessalonica to intervene, before coming himself to Thessaly at the head of an army. The Byzantines soon regained control of most of the region, although the historian Božidar Ferjančić doubts Kantakouzenos' assertion that the Epirote forces were completely expelled and all of Thessaly recaptured at that time, pointing out the lack of imperial charters in western Thessaly before 1336, and insists that the imperial forces captured only the eastern portions of the region in 1332/3. Andronikos III, after spending the winter in the area, left Monomachos as the governor of the new province, with the title of protosebastos. At the latest by the time of John II Orsini's death in 1335, Monomachos and Andronikos III were able to extend Byzantine control over western Thessaly as well, and even to advance into Epirus proper and capture Ioannina.

In 1338, Andronikos III completed his invasion of the Epirote heartland by capturing the Epirote capital, Arta, and annexing Epirus to the Empire. This move was opposed by the local population, who in the next year rebelled against Palaiologan rule. The Epirotes rallied around their young ruler, Nikephoros II Orsini, who escaped Byzantine custody and returned to Epirus with troops from the Angevin court of Naples. The rebels captured Arta and took the Byzantine governor, Theodore Synadenos, prisoner. Consequently, in late 1339 or early 1340, a Byzantine army under Monomachos and John Angelos advanced against the rebels, followed soon by the emperor himself. By the end of the year, the various rebel-held strongholds capitulated. Nikephoros was accorded the title of panhypersebastos and sent to Thessalonica, where his mother and sister already lived, and Epirus returned to Byzantine control with John Angelos as governor.

With the outbreak of the new civil war between John Kantakouzenos and the regency for John V Palaiologos in 1341, Monomachos initially tried to remain neutral, leading the regents to confiscate his estates at the village of Chantax near Strymon River. In 1342, he left or was driven from Thessaly by the pro-Kantakouzenos faction, and went to Serres, where he joined the anti-Kantakouzenist forces holding the city. He was named megas konostaulos at about that time, and died sometime between 1343 and 1346.

== Sources ==
- Ferjančić, Božidar (1974). Тесалија у XIII и XIV веку [Thessaly in the 13th and 14th Centuries] (in Serbian). Belgrade: Византолошког институт САНУ.
- Fine, John V. A. (1994) [1987]. The Late Medieval Balkans: A Critical Survey from the Late Twelfth Century to the Ottoman Conquest. Ann Arbor, Michigan: University of Michigan Press. ISBN 978-0-472-10079-8.
- Kazhdan, Alexander (1991). "Monomachos". In Kazhdan, Alexander (ed.). The Oxford Dictionary of Byzantium. Oxford and New York: Oxford University Press. p. 1398. ISBN 0-19-504652-8.
- Trapp, Erich; Beyer, Hans-Veit; Walther, Rainer; Sturm-Schnabl, Katja; Kislinger, Ewald; Leontiadis, Ioannis; Kaplaneres, Sokrates (1976–1996). Prosopographisches Lexikon der Palaiologenzeit (in German). Vienna: Verlag der Österreichischen Akademie der Wissenschaften. ISBN 3-7001-3003-1.
