= John II Doukas of Thessaly =

John II Doukas
- Sebastokrator

Ruler of Thessaly or Great Vlachia
- Reign: 1303–1318
- Predecessor: Constantine Doukas
- Died: 1318
- Dynasty: Komnenodoukai
- Father: Constantine Doukas

John II Doukas, also Angelos Doukas (Latinized as Angelus Ducas) (Greek: Ἰωάννης Ἄγγελος Δούκας, romanized: Iōannēs Angelos Doukas), was ruler of Great Vlachia (Thessaly) from 1303 to his death in 1318.

John II Angelos Doukas was the son of Constantine Doukas of Thessaly by his wife Anna Euagionissa. He succeeded to his father's lands as a child in 1303. The Thessalian magnates chose his father's cousin Duke Guy II de la Roche of Athens as regent, and the duke promptly established his protectorate over Thessaly, with Anthony le Flamenc as his deputy (bailli). Guy was the son of Duke William I de la Roche by Helena Angelina Komnene, the daughter of John I Doukas of Thessaly.

The selection of the duke of Athens as regent proved both timely and fortuitous. Anna Palaiologina Kantakouzene, the regent of Epirus had invaded Thessaly, but was now forced to retreat by Guy's forces. Guy proved less successful, however, in restraining the Catalan Company, which burst into Thessaly in 1306 and proceeded to ravage the region for some three years. By the time Guy died in 1308 John had just come of age and resented the attempt of the new duke of Athens, Walter of Brienne, to maintain Athenian protectorate over Thessaly. To overcome John's resistance, Walter hired the Catalan Company himself, and charged it with asserting his authority over Thessaly. The Catalans conquered many fortresses, but insisted on garrisoning them by themselves. Frightened by their disobedience, Walter now turned against them, but the Catalans invaded his duchy in 1310. When the two forces clashed, Walter was defeated and killed in the Battle of Halmyros or Kephissos in 1311.

With the Catalans moving into Boeotia, Attica, and the Gulf of Corinth coast, John II was able to exert more control over Thessaly. Here he encountered the opposition of the local magnates, who had probably become accustomed to central authority that had been even more ineffectual than usually. John attempted to strengthen his position by drawing closer to the Byzantine Empire and marrying Irene Palaiologina, the illegitimate daughter of Emperor Andronikos II Palaiologos in 1315. Perhaps at this time John was conferred the title of sebastokratōr. He was already relying on some Byzantine assistance against the Catalans within his domains, but died in 1318 without heirs.

On John II's death in 1318 much of northwestern Thessaly came under the control of the powerful magnate Stephen Gabrielopoulos, but the southernmost areas around Neopatras were seized by the Catalans, who set up their own principality there (the Duchy of Neopatras).

Preceded by Constantine Doukas	Ruler of Thessaly; 1303–1318	Partition of Thessaly among Byzantines, Catalans, and regional magnates
