= Stephen Gabrielopoulos =

Stephen Gabrielopoulos (Greek: Στέφανος Γαβριηλόπουλος, died 1332/1333) was a powerful magnate and semi-independent ruler in western Thessaly, who pledged allegiance to the Byzantine Empire and was rewarded with the title of sebastokrator.

== Biography ==
After Thessaly's ruler John II Doukas (r. 1303–1318) died in 1318 without a male heir, the Byzantine Empire moved to take advantage of the power vacuum in the region. Byzantine troops under John Kantakouzenos occupied northern Thessaly, while the Catalans of the Duchy of Athens moved into the southern parts of the region. Central Thessaly became a battleground for the various local magnates, who competed with each other and called upon the two states for aid. One of those who turned to Byzantium for support was Gabrielopoulos, who possessed many estates in western Thessaly as well as in parts of southwestern Macedonia, his lands reaching from Trikala to Kastoria. Sometime between 1318 and 1325, he acknowledged Byzantine suzerainty and was given the title of sebastokrator in return. He thus became the de facto governor of much of Thessaly on behalf of the Byzantine emperor, but preserving much local autonomy. His possessions included the towns and fortresses of Trikala, Phanarion, Stagoi, Damasis, and Elasson. After his death in 1332/3, however, his heirs began quarrelling amongst themselves, leading to an invasion by the Epirote ruler John II Orsini, while the Byzantines under Andronikos III Palaiologos (r. 1328–1341) moved in and established direct control over the northern and eastern part of the region. With Orsini's death three years later, all of Thessaly came under Byzantine control.

== Sources ==
- Ferjančić, Božidar (1974). Тесалија у XIII и XIV веку [Thessaly in the 13th and 14th Centuries] (in Serbian). Belgrade: Византолошког институт САНУ.
- Fine, John V. A. Jr. (1994) [1987]. The Late Medieval Balkans: A Critical Survey from the Late Twelfth Century to the Ottoman Conquest. Ann Arbor, Michigan: University of Michigan Press. ISBN 978-0-472-10079-8. OCLC 749133662.
- Kazhdan, Alexander, ed. (1991). The Oxford Dictionary of Byzantium. Oxford and New York: Oxford University Press. ISBN 0-19-504652-8.

Preceded by John II Doukas	Ruler of northwestern Thessaly (under Byzantine suzerainty) ca. 1318 – ca. 1332	Succeeded by John Orsini (Epirus); Michael Monomachos (Byzantine Empire)
