= Fanari, Karditsa =

Fanari Φανάρι
- Community
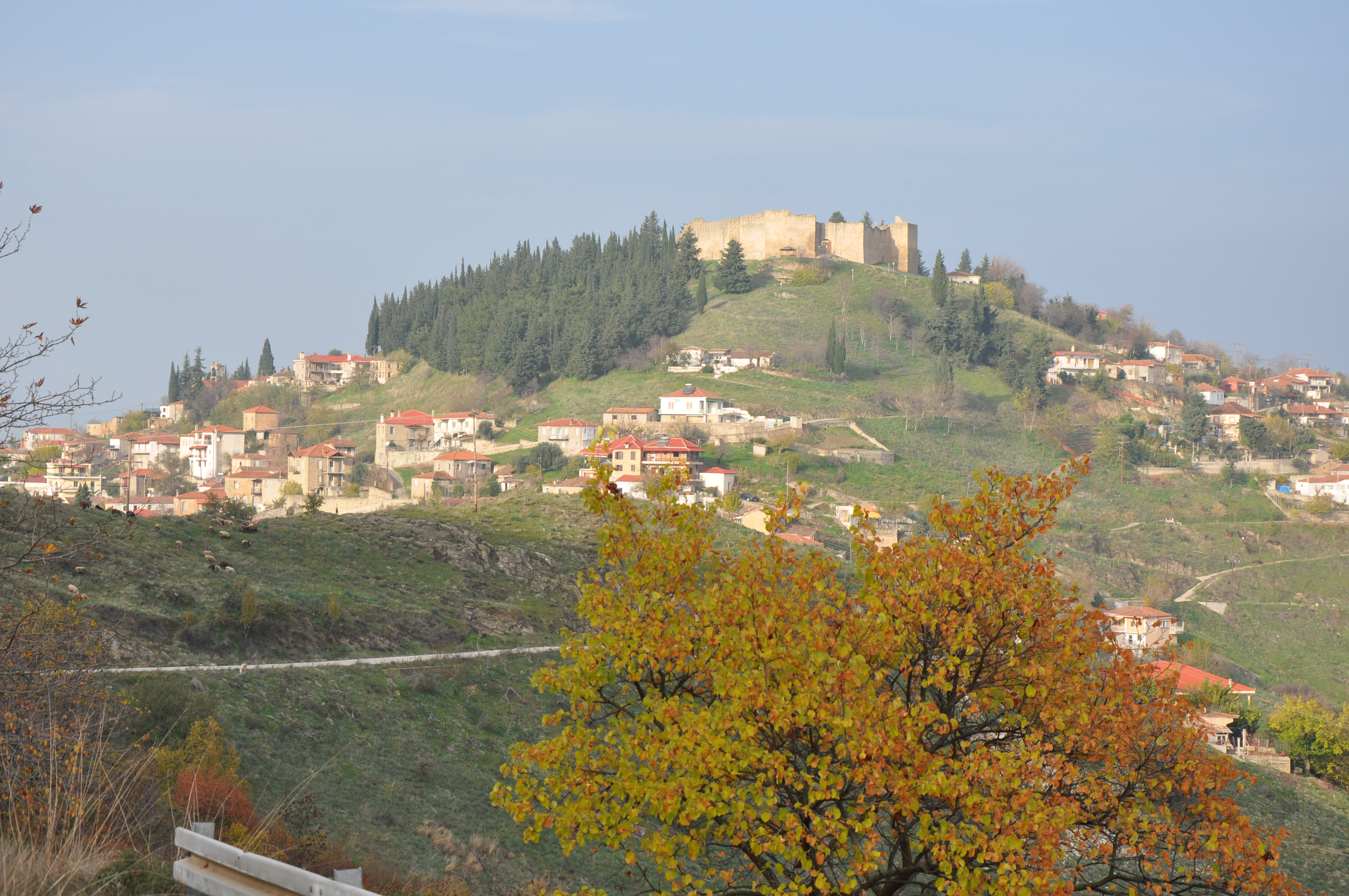

- Location within Greece
- Coordinates: 39°24.57′N 21°48.06′E
- Country: Greece
- Administrative region: Central Greece
- Regional unit: Karditsa
- Municipality: Mouzaki
- Municipal unit: Ithomi

Population (2021)
  - Community: 502
- Time zone: UTC+2 (EET)
  - Summer (DST): UTC+3 (EEST)

Fanari (Greek: Φανάρι) or Fanarion (Φανάριον) is a village in Karditsa, Greece, with a population of 433 (2011 census). Since the 2011 local government reform it is part of the municipality Mouzaki, whereas before that it was the seat of the municipality of Ithomi. Fanari occupies the site of the ancient town of Ithome.

== History ==
The village is located on the end of a series of hills extending into the Thessalian plain northwest of Karditsa, and commands a broad view of the surrounding area. The current settlement dates to the later Middle Ages, but is located on the ruins of the ancient city of Ithome, which survived until early Byzantine times.

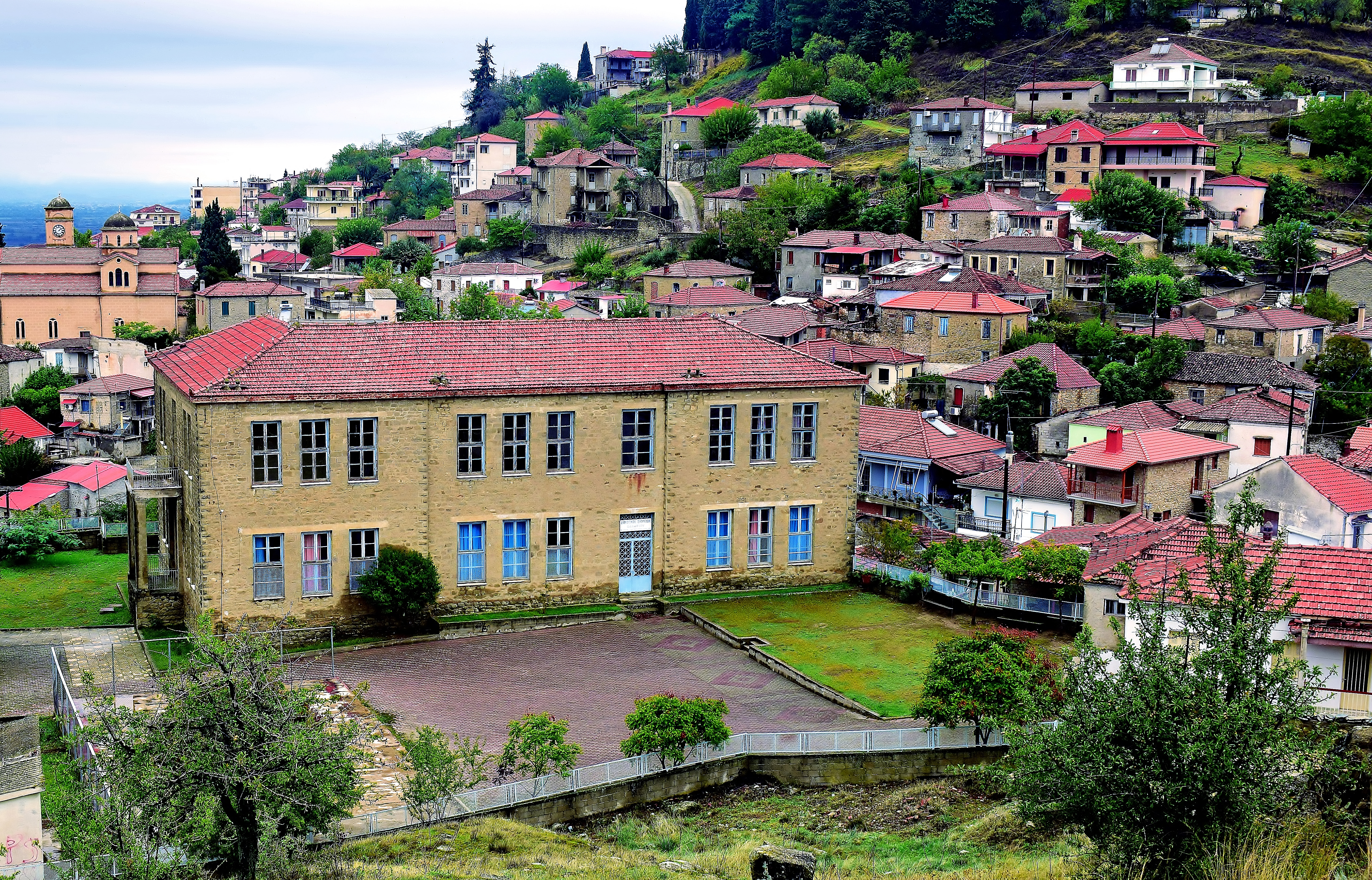
Elementary school

Fanari is mentioned for the first time in 1304, when it was briefly occupied by the forces of the regent of Epirus, Anna Palaiologina Kantakouzene. It then came under the control of the autonomous Thessalian magnate Stephen Gabrielopoulos, and on his death in 1333 it passed to the ruler of Epirus, John II Orsini, who fortified it. The castle, a plain structure on a circular plateau some 100 m across, is well preserved to this day. It features five square towers, and a strong gate-tower on its western side, while a cistern and remains of a barracks survive in the interior. The archontes (local elders) of Fanari are mentioned in several documents: in 1342 Michael Gabrielopoulos assured them that no Albanians would be settled in their area, and confirmed their possession of the monasteries of Lykousada and Porta Panagia, while in 1382 the archontes are mentioned in a local church synod. In 1444, when the Despot of the Morea and future Byzantine emperor, Constantine XI Palaiologos, briefly expanded his control into Central Greece, he installed a governor of his own in Fanari.

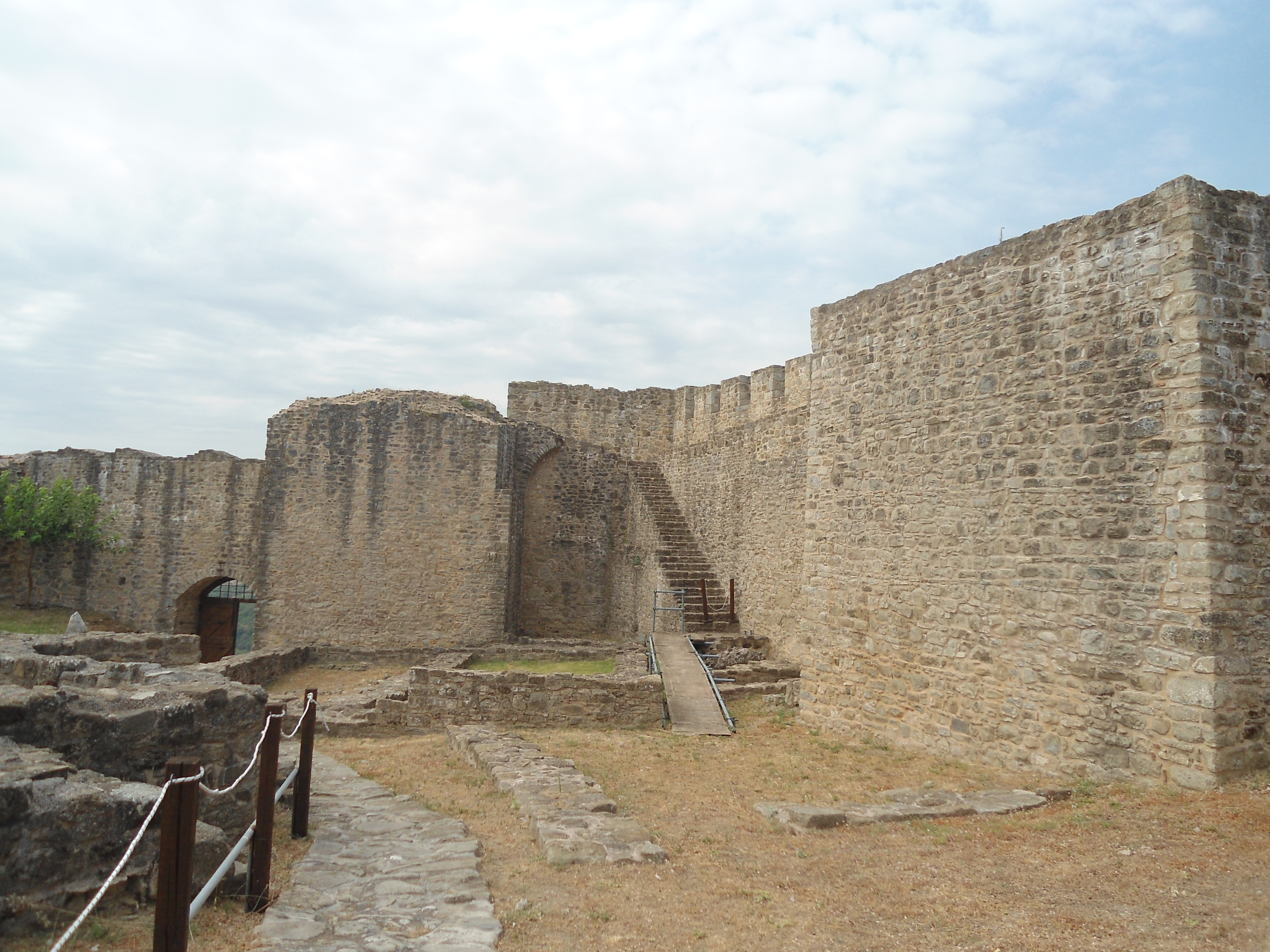
Interior of the castle

A local bishopric is attested from 1382 to 1388 on, initially in combination with Kappoua (modern Kappas), but after the Ottoman conquest of Thessaly it became a separate see and was even raised to an archbishopric. In 1521 (Hijri 927) the town of Fenar had 53 Muslim households in three neighborhoods, and 370 Christian households in six neighborhoods.

Today the see is a titular bishopric within the Church of Greece, held since 2003 by Agathangelos (Vasileios) Haramantidis.

== Population ==
Historical population

Year	Pop.	±%
1881	1,704	—
1889	2,032	+19.2%
1896	1,837	−9.6%
1907	1,962	+6.8%
1920	2,307	+17.6%
1928	2,420	+4.9%
1940	2,219	−8.3%
1951	1,928	−13.1%

Year	Pop.	±%
1961	1,753	−9.1%
1971	1,310	−25.3%
1981	1,033	−21.1%
1991	871	−15.7%
2001	719	−17.5%
2011	580	−19.3%
2021	502	−13.4%

Source: Population censuses

== Sources ==
- Koder, Johannes; Hild, Friedrich (1976). Tabula Imperii Byzantini, Band 1: Hellas und Thessalia (in German). Vienna: Verlag der Österreichischen Akademie der Wissenschaften. ISBN 978-3-7001-0182-6.
