= John I Doukas of Thessaly =

John I Doukas
- Sebastokratōr
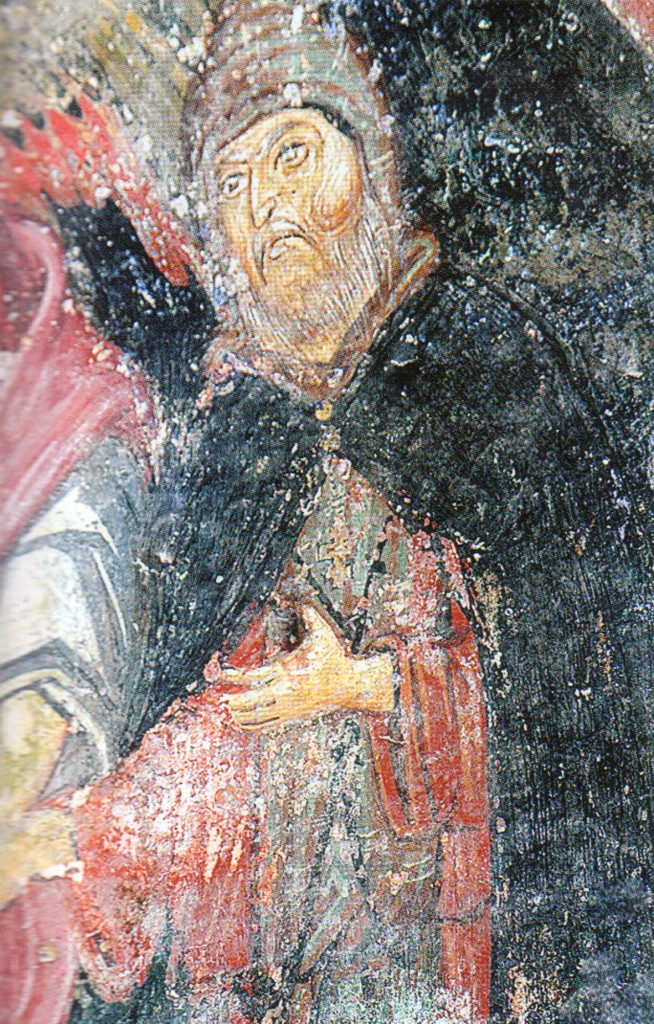
- Fresco of John as a monk, from his burial place at the monastery of Porta Panagia

Ruler of Thessaly
- Reign: 1268–1289
- Predecessor: Michael II (as Despot of Epirus)
- Successor: Constantine and Theodore
- Died: 1289
- Issue: Michael; Constantine; Theodore; Helena Komnene; Helena Doukaina Angelina two unnamed daughters
- Dynasty: Komnenos Doukas
- Father: Michael II
- Mother: Theodora of Arta

John I Doukas (Greek: Ἰωάννης Δούκας, romanized: Iōánnēs Doúkas), Latinized as Ducas, was an illegitimate son of Michael II Komnenos Doukas, Despot of Epirus in c. 1230–1268. After his father's death, he became ruler of Thessaly from c. 1268 to his own death in 1289. From his father's family he is also inaccurately known as John Angelos.

Married to a Thessalian Vlach woman, John first appears leading Vlach troops alongside his father in the lead-up to the Battle of Pelagonia in 1259. His defection to the camp of Emperor Michael VIII Palaiologos was crucial in the battle, which ended with the crushing defeat of the Epirotes' Latin allies and opened the way for the recovery of Constantinople and the re-establishment of the Byzantine Empire under Palaiologos in 1261. John quickly returned to the side of his father and brother, Nikephoros, and assisted them in recovering Epirus and Thessaly. After Michael II died, John Doukas became ruler of Thessaly with his seat at Neopatras, whence Western chroniclers often erroneously called him "Duke of Neopatras".

Although Michael VIII Palaiologos engaged him in a marriage alliance and awarded him with the high title of sebastokratōr, John remained the foremost of Palaiologos' Greek opponents throughout the latter's reign. A staunch opponent of the Union of the Churches promoted by Palaiologos for political reasons, he provided refuge to several political opponents of the emperor, and even convoked synods that anathematized Palaiologos and the supporters of the Union. He resisted several attempts by Byzantine armies to conquer Thessaly, and allied himself with Palaiologos' Latin enemies, including the Duchy of Athens and Charles of Anjou. He died in 1289, leaving the rule of Thessaly to his sons, Constantine and Theodore.

== Origin and early life ==
John Doukas was an illegitimate (and apparently the eldest) son of Michael II Komnenos Doukas, the Despot of Epirus, possibly by his one known mistress, an unnamed lady of the Gangrenos family. His full family name was Doukas Komnenos Angelos, but he is almost universally referred to in the sources simply by the first surname of "Doukas". This also led to a confusion among his Latin contemporaries, who mistook it for his title, and referred to him as the "Duke of Neopatras". (Note: This would give rise to an actual "Duchy of Neopatras", under Latin rule, in 1319.) His actual title, which he received from the Byzantine emperor Michael VIII Palaiologos in c. 1272, was sebastokratōr.

Nothing is known of his early life before 1259, when he is mentioned for his participation in the events that led up to the Battle of Pelagonia, where he led a contingent of Vlachs. By that time, he was already married to a daughter of the Thessalian Vlach chieftain Taronas. She is only known by the monastic name she assumed after his death, Hypomone ("Patience"). This and his later association with the region of Thessaly has led to suggestions by modern scholars that he ruled Thessaly in his father's name, but there is no concrete evidence to back this up. It is equally unclear whether the Vlach troops he commanded were part of the official Epirote army, or a privately raised force. John played a crucial role in the Battle of Pelagonia, where his desertion from the coalition composed by his father, Prince William II Villehardouin of Achaea, and King Manfred of Sicily, contributed to the defeat of the allies by the forces of the Nicaean Empire under John Palaiologos, Michael VIII's brother. The reason for the defection is unclear, as the various sources offer conflicting accounts. Both George Pachymeres and Marino Sanudo Torcello report that during the march, John became incensed at some Achaean knights, who openly coveted his beautiful wife. Matters were made worse when William of Villehardouin not only did not punish his men, but also insulted John Doukas for his illegitimate birth, prompting the latter to defect before the battle, after receiving assurances that he would not have to fight his own father; thereupon the Epirotes too left, and the Latin troops were overwhelmed by the Nicaeans.

Following the battle, John accompanied the Nicaeans in their rapid occupation of the Epirote domains, but he quickly became alienated from them. He brought his own followers to the coastal town of Vonitsa, from where he contacted his father, who had taken refuge in the Ionian Islands. Michael accepted his son's apologies, and soon joined him on the mainland. Nicaean control over Epirus had not yet been consolidated, and father and son were quickly able to recapture the Epirote capital of Arta and then relieve the besieged city of Ioannina. Within a short time, the Nicaeans had been evicted from Epirus. John's half-brother Nikephoros was then sent in spring 1260 to recover Thessaly, which he mostly accomplished after defeating and capturing the Nicaean general Alexios Strategopoulos. Part of eastern Thessaly, however, around the towns of Demetrias, Velestino, Halmyros, and Pharsalos, remained in Nicaean hands for several years thereafter. Again, despite his later association with Thessaly, John is not mentioned as playing a role in these events or in the administration of the Thessalian territories in the early 1260s, which seem rather to have been under the control of Nikephoros.

The Battle of Pelagonia has frequently been described as a decisive event, but this is only partly true. Michael VIII Palaiologos' gains were rapidly reversed and his rivals quickly regained their strength, with both the Epirotes and Manfred of Sicily reclaiming most of the territories they had lost. Nevertheless, the effects of the battle were not wholly undone: Palaiologos' victory, gained with the assistance of John Doukas, not only prevented the Epirote–Latin league of 1259 from taking Thessalonica and much of Nicaea's European domains, but also provided a valuable breathing space in the lead-up to the eventual recovery of Constantinople in 1261, which led to the re-establishment of the Byzantine Empire under the Palaiologos dynasty.

== Ruler of Thessaly ==
Map of the Greek and Latin states in southern Greece c. 1278.

When Michael II died c. 1268, his realm was divided, with Nikephoros receiving the metropolitan territories of Epirus proper and John taking over the Epirote domains in Thessaly and Central Greece. According to Gregoras, his realm extended from Mount Olympus in the north to Mount Parnassus in the south, with the Achelous River serving as his border with Epirus proper; his capital was at Neopatras. Michael VIII seized the opportunity of Michael's death for a rapprochement with the two brothers. He gave Nikephoros his niece Anna in marriage, and arranged a marriage between his nephew Andronikos Tarchaneiotes and a daughter of John, who in addition received the high title of sebastokratōr.

Nevertheless, John fiercely guarded his independence, and was prepared to ally himself with Latin powers hostile to Palaiologos, namely Charles of Anjou and the Duchy of Athens. He soon emerged as "the more dangerous and the more actively hostile" of the minor Greek rulers against Michael VIII. As Donald Nicol writes, he "was a man of great resource and ambition, and was clearly in touch with the Emperor's opponents in Constantinople. His stronghold of Neopatras was uncomfortably close to the Latin-occupied parts of Greece, particularly the Duchy of Athens and Thebes with which he was in alliance; and it was easier for troublemakers and refugees from [Constantinople] to make their escape to Thessaly than to Epirus". This is well illustrated by the affair of John's son-in-law, Andronikos Tarchaneiotes: angered at the Emperor's preference for his younger brother Michael, he provoked a Tatar raid into Thrace, and in the confusion sought refuge at John's court. The first documented contacts between John and Michael VIII's arch-enemy, Charles of Anjou, also date to the same time (April 1273). A commercial treaty was concluded, allowing the export of silk from Thessaly to Apulia and the import of horses from Italy, but it is clear that these contacts were also the first steps for John joining the coalition being prepared by Charles against Constantinople and its ruler.

Michael VIII sought to counter the threat of a new crusade, led by Charles of Anjou and aiming at the restoration of the Latin Empire, by negotiating a union of the Roman Catholic and Eastern Orthodox churches. The Union of the Churches was concluded at the Council of Lyons in 1274, at which the Emperor's representatives were forced to recognize Papal primacy. This decision aroused passionate opposition from the Byzantine people, the Orthodox clergy, and even within the imperial family itself. Michael VIII's sister Eulogia, and her daughter Anna, wife of John's half-brother Nikephoros, were among the chief leaders of the anti-Unionists. Nikephoros, John, and even the Emperor of Trebizond, John II Megas Komnenos, soon joined the anti-Unionist cause and gave support to the anti-Unionists fleeing Constantinople.

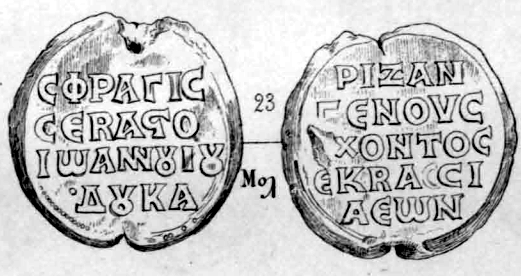
Lead seal of John I

Michael VIII asked Pope Gregory X to excommunicate John Doukas, but the Pope, who was probably uncertain of the Byzantine emperor's true loyalties, refused. Michael VIII would continue to press Gregory's successors, Innocent V and Nicholas III, for the same, as well as for a dissolution of John's alliance with Charles, but without success. In 1275, Michael VIII sent an army under his brother John Palaiologos and Alexios Kaballarios against John. The Byzantines surprised John at Neopatras and laid siege to his fortress, before he could react. John saved himself by sneaking through enemy lines disguised as a lowly groom seeking a stray horse, and made his way to the Duke of Athens, John I de la Roche. Having secured 300 horsemen from him, he returned to Neopatras and scattered the Byzantine army. In exchange for this aid, however, John gave his daughter to de la Roche's son, William de la Roche, with the towns of Zetounion, Gardiki, Gravia, and Siderokastron as her dowry. In April 1277, papal legates arrived at Constantinople and forced Michael VIII, his son and heir Andronikos, and the Patriarch John XI Bekkos, to publicly reaffirm their allegiance to the Union at a synod in the Palace of Blachernae. John once more rejected Michael VIII's overtures for an acceptance of the Union, and on 1 May 1277, convoked a synod of his own at Neopatras which anathematized the Emperor, the Patriarch, and the Pope as heretics. In response, a synod was convoked at the Hagia Sophia on 16 July where both Nikephoros and John were anathematized in return. John convoked another synod at Neopatras in December 1277, where an anti-Unionist council of eight bishops, a few abbots, and one hundred monks, again anathematized Emperor, Patriarch and Pope. Only two bishops, those of Trikala and Neopatras, refused, and were punished.

Michael VIII then launched another invasion, led by the pinkernēs Manuel Raoul, the prōtostratōr Andronikos Palaiologos, and others. Instead of confronting the sebastokratōr, however, they fraternized with him and gave every sign of their own opposition to the Union. Michael VIII relieved and imprisoned them and appointed new commanders, the megas stratopedarchēs John Synadenos and the megas konostaulos Michael Kaballarios. The latter were lured by John Doukas into an ambush and suffered a crushing defeat at Pharsalos.

Michael VIII died on 11 December 1282, while preparing to invade Thessaly again. With the threat of an Angevin invasion having subsided following the Sicilian Vespers, his successor, Andronikos II Palaiologos (r. 1282–1328), was quick to repudiated the hated Union of the Churches. As a result, ecclesiastical ties between Thessaly, Epirus, and Constantinople were restored. Nikephoros of Epirus, a weak ruler dominated by his wife, and uneasy with his half-brother's ambitions—there are hints in the sources that John coveted Epirus, and that he had launched an attack on Ioannina—now drifted into the Byzantine orbit. Anna visited her cousin Andronikos II at Constantinople, and a plot was hatched against John: in 1283 or 1284 Nikephoros and Anna invited John's son Michael to Epirus to marry their daughter, and become the heir to their state. When Michael took the bait, he was arrested and shipped off to Constantinople, where he died in prison. Andronikos launched an invasion of Thessaly, but his troops were annihilated by malaria. In the next year (1284 or 1285), John took his revenge for his half-brother's treason by invading Epirus and raiding the environs of Arta. Following this punitive expedition, relations between Thessaly and Epirus settled down to an uneasy peace.

For many years, modern historians, following the 19th-century scholar Karl Hopf, erroneously held that John Doukas died in 1296. It has since been established that he died in or shortly before March 1289. He was buried in the monastery of Porta Panagia, which he had founded in 1283. His tomb lies in the south side of the katholikon, and a fresco above his tomb shows him "as a monk being presented by an angel to the enthroned Virgin". After his death, his widow was compelled to recognize the suzerainty of Andronikos II Palaiologos to safeguard the position of her underage sons Constantine and Theodore. Just as when John himself had done so in the past, however, this suzerainty was purely nominal.

== Family ==
By his wife, who is only known by her monastic name Hypomone ("Patience"), John had several children, including:

- Michael Komnenos, who died as prisoner in Constantinople in 1307.
- Constantine Doukas (died 1303), who succeeded as ruler of Thessaly. He married Anna Euagionissa, and had at least one son, John II Doukas (died 1318), ruler of Thessaly.
- Theodore Angelos (died c. 1300), co-ruler of Thessaly alongside Constantine.
- Helena Angelina Komnene, who married firstly William I de la Roche, Duke of Athens, and secondly Hugh de Brienne, Count of Lecce.
- Helena Doukaina Angelina, who married King Stefan Uroš II Milutin of Serbia.
- unidentified daughter, who married Andronikos Tarchaneiotes, a nephew of Emperor Michael VIII Palaiologos.
- unidentified daughter, betrothed to the future Emperor Theodore Svetoslav of Bulgaria.

== Sources ==
- Constantinides, Efthalia C. (1992). The Wall Paintings of the Panagia Olympiotissa at Elasson in Northern Thessaly, Volume 1. Athens: Canadian Archaeological Institute at Athens.
- Fine, John V. A., Jr. (1994) [1987]. The Late Medieval Balkans: A Critical Survey from the Late Twelfth Century to the Ottoman Conquest. Ann Arbor, Michigan: University of Michigan Press. ISBN 978-0-472-10079-8.
- Geanakoplos, Deno John (1953). "Greco-Latin Relations on the Eve of the Byzantine Restoration: The Battle of Pelagonia–1259". Dumbarton Oaks Papers. 7: 99–141. doi:10.2307/1291057. JSTOR 1291057.
- Geanakoplos, Deno John (1959). Emperor Michael Palaeologus and the West, 1258–1282: A Study in Byzantine-Latin Relations. Cambridge, Massachusetts: Harvard University Press.
- Kazhdan, Alexander, ed. (1991). The Oxford Dictionary of Byzantium. Oxford and New York: Oxford University Press. ISBN 0-19-504652-8.
- Koder, Johannes; Hild, Friedrich (1976). Tabula Imperii Byzantini, Band 1: Hellas und Thessalia (in German). Vienna: Verlag der Österreichischen Akademie der Wissenschaften. ISBN 978-3-7001-0182-6.
- Nicol, D. M. (1962). "The Greeks and the Union of the Churches. The Report of Ogerius, Protonotarius of Michael VIII Palaiologos, in 1280". Proceedings of the Royal Irish Academy, Section C. 63: 1–16. JSTOR 25505111.
- Polemis, Demetrios I. (1968). The Doukai: A Contribution to Byzantine Prosopography. London: The Athlone Press.
- Trapp, Erich; Beyer, Hans-Veit; Walther, Rainer; Sturm-Schnabl, Katja; Kislinger, Ewald; Leontiadis, Ioannis; Kaplaneres, Sokrates (1976–1996). Prosopographisches Lexikon der Palaiologenzeit (in German). Vienna: Verlag der Österreichischen Akademie der Wissenschaften. ISBN 3-7001-3003-1.

Preceded by Michael II Komnenos Doukas as Despot of Epirus	Ruler of Thessaly; 1268–1289	Succeeded by Constantine Doukas and Theodore Angelos
