= Theodore Angelos =

- Sebastokrator

Co-ruler of Thessaly
- Reign: c. 1289–c. 1299
- Predecessor: John I Doukas
- Successor: Constantine Doukas
- Died: c. 1299
- Dynasty: Komnenodoukai
- Father: John I Doukas
- Mother: Hypomone

Theodore Angelos (Greek: Θεόδωρος Ἄγγελος, romanized: Theodōros Angelos) was co-ruler of Thessaly from c. 1289 to his death in c. 1299.

Theodore was the third son of John I Doukas, ruler of Thessaly by his wife, who is only known by her monastic name Hypomone ("Patience"). When John died in or shortly before 1289, he was succeeded by Theodore's older brother Constantine, but Theodore served as his co-ruler. Initially, the two brothers were under the tutelage of Anna Palaiologina Kantakouzene as they were underage. Awarded the title of sebastokrator from the Byzantine emperor in 1295, he was scheduled to marry the Armenian princess Theophano, daughter of King Leo II, but this project fell through. He was defeated in battle by the Byzantine general Michael Doukas Glabas Tarchaneiotes, and died in c. 1299.

== Sources ==
- Ferjančić, Božidar (1974). Тесалија у XIII и XIV веку [Thessaly in the 13th and 14th Centuries] (in Serbian). Belgrade: Византолошког институт САНУ.
- Fine, John V. A. (1994) [1987]. The Late Medieval Balkans: A Critical Survey from the Late Twelfth Century to the Ottoman Conquest. Ann Arbor, Michigan: University of Michigan Press. ISBN 978-0-472-10079-8.
- Polemis, Demetrios I. (1968). The Doukai: A Contribution to Byzantine Prosopography. London: The Athlone Press.
- Trapp, Erich; Beyer, Hans-Veit; Walther, Rainer; Sturm-Schnabl, Katja; Kislinger, Ewald; Leontiadis, Ioannis; Kaplaneres, Sokrates (1976–1996). Prosopographisches Lexikon der Palaiologenzeit (in German). Vienna: Verlag der Österreichischen Akademie der Wissenschaften. ISBN 3-7001-3003-1.

Preceded by John I Doukas	Ruler of Thessaly c. 1289–c. 1299; With: Constantine Doukas	Succeeded by Constantine Doukas
