= John Angelos (sebastokrator) =

Byzantine aristocrat, general and governor

- Died: 1348
- Citizenship: Byzantine Empire
- Years active: 1328–1348
- Title: pinkernes and sebastokrator, governor (kephale) of Epirus and Thessaly
- Relatives: John VI Kantakouzenos (cousin)

John Angelos (Greek: Ἰωάννης Ἄγγελος; fl. 1328–1348) was a Byzantine aristocrat, general, and governor. He first distinguished himself in the suppression of a revolt in Epirus in 1339–1340, where he was subsequently appointed as governor. A relative of the statesman and emperor John VI Kantakouzenos, he took the latter's side in the Byzantine civil war of 1341–1347 and in late 1342 received the governorship of Thessaly (and possibly Epirus), which he held until his death in 1348.

== Biography ==
John Angelos was a relative – he is variously qualified as a nephew or cousin, with the latter being more likely – of John Kantakouzenos, the closest friend and associate of Emperor Andronikos III Palaiologos (r. 1328–1341) and later emperor as John VI (r. 1341–1354). The names and identities of John's parents are unknown. The only precise information available is that he was the son-in-law of the protovestiarios Andronikos Palaiologos. In his memoirs, John Kantakouzenos states that he himself raised John Angelos and taught him about warfare.

John first appears in 1328, when he was governor of the city of Kastoria, and then ca. 1336/7, when he held the post of governor (kephale) of Ioannina with the title of pinkernes. Ioannina, like most of the lands of the Despotate of Epirus, had been recently annexed by Andronikos III, following the sudden death of the Epirote ruler John II Orsini in 1335 which left Epirus in the weak hands of the young Nikephoros II Orsini and his mother Anna Palaiologina. Byzantine rule was generally resented by the local populace, and in 1339 a revolt broke out in Epirus, which quickly gained ground and succeeded in taking a few key fortresses, including the capital, Arta. Later in the same year, John Angelos was sent by Andronikos III along with the governor of Thessaly, Michael Monomachos, as the vanguard of the Byzantine army into Epirus. The emperor himself and Kantakouzenos followed in spring 1340. The rebels avoided a pitched battle and retired to the fortresses, which one by one fell after sieges or through negotiations, so that the region was subdued by the end of the year. John Angelos was appointed as imperial governor of Epirus with his seat at Arta.

John remained in Epirus as governor until the death of Andronikos III in June 1341. He then left his post and travelled with a delegation of high officials to meet with Kantakouzenos at Didymoteichon. With the outbreak of the civil war in early autumn, he sided with Kantakouzenos and was present at the latter's acclamation as emperor at Didymoteichon on 26 October 1341. In spring 1342, Angelos followed Kantakouzenos in his abortive campaign to Thessalonica and his subsequent flight to Serbia and the court of its ruler Stephen Dushan (r. 1331–1346).

Later in the year however, the magnates of Thessaly approached Kantakouzenos and offered their support in the war. After the negotiations were successfully concluded, Kantakouzenos issued a chrysobull appointing John Angelos as governor of Thessaly for life. Although Angelos was later raised to the high rank of sebastokrator and enjoyed a measure of autonomy, his authority was circumscribed: the post was not hereditary, and he functioned strictly as the emperor's deputy. Angelos ruled Thessaly with success. Taking advantage of the decline of the Catalans of the Duchy of Athens, he made gains in the south, and even managed to extend his authority over Epirus and Acarnania as well, where he seized and placed under house arrest Anna Palaiologina, the scheming widow of John II Orsini and sister of Angelos's own wife. His actions, in the midst of the ongoing civil war, gave Kantakouzenos's cause a much-needed boost. In early 1343, he also participated, at the head of a Thessalian cavalry contingent, in Kantakouzenos's failed attempt to take Thessalonica.

John Angelos continued to govern Thessaly (and possibly Epirus and Aetolia-Acarnania as well) until early 1348, when he died of the Black Death, which ravaged Thessaly and Epirus and caused severe depopulation in 1347–1348. The Serbs quickly took advantage of this: Epirus fell to the Serbs under Dushan himself in autumn 1347, while Thessaly was taken within a few months after John's death by the Serbian general Gregory Preljub, who became its new governor on behalf of Dushan.

== Family ==
Little is known of John Angelos's family. He married one of the daughters of the protovestiarios Andronikos Palaiologos, a sister to the queen of Epirus Anna Palaiologina. It is unknown if he had any children, although some writers have posited that the brothers known as the "Pinkernaioi", active in Epirus at the turn of the 15th century, were his descendants.

== Sources ==
- Bartusis, Mark C. (1997). The Late Byzantine Army: Arms and Society 1204–1453. Philadelphia, Pennsylvania: University of Pennsylvania Press. ISBN 0-8122-1620-2.
- Fine, John V. A. Jr. (1994) [1987]. The Late Medieval Balkans: A Critical Survey from the Late Twelfth Century to the Ottoman Conquest. Ann Arbor, Michigan: University of Michigan Press. ISBN 0-472-08260-4.
- Guilland, Rodolphe (1967). Recherches sur les Institutions Byzantines, Tome I (in French). Berlin: Akademie-Verlag.
- Nicol, Donald M. (1968). The Byzantine Family of Kantakouzenos (Cantacuzenus), ca. 1100–1460: A Genealogical and Prosopographical Study. Dumbarton Oaks studies 11. Washington, DC: Dumbarton Oaks Center for Byzantine Studies. OCLC 390843.
- Nicol, Donald MacGillivray (1996). The Reluctant Emperor: A Biography of John Cantacuzene, Byzantine Emperor and Monk, c. 1295–1383. Cambridge: Cambridge University Press. ISBN 978-0-521-52201-4.
- Nicol, Donald MacGillivray (2010). The Despotate of Epiros 1267–1479: A Contribution to the History of Greece in the Middle Ages. Cambridge: Cambridge University Press. ISBN 978-0-521-13089-9.
- Trapp, Erich; Beyer, Hans-Veit; Walther, Rainer; Sturm-Schnabl, Katja; Kislinger, Ewald; Leontiadis, Ioannis; Kaplaneres, Sokrates (1976–1996). Prosopographisches Lexikon der Palaiologenzeit (in German). Vienna: Verlag der Österreichischen Akademie der Wissenschaften. ISBN 3-7001-3003-1.
