= Sebastokrator =

Byzantine court title

- Σεβαστοκράτωρ
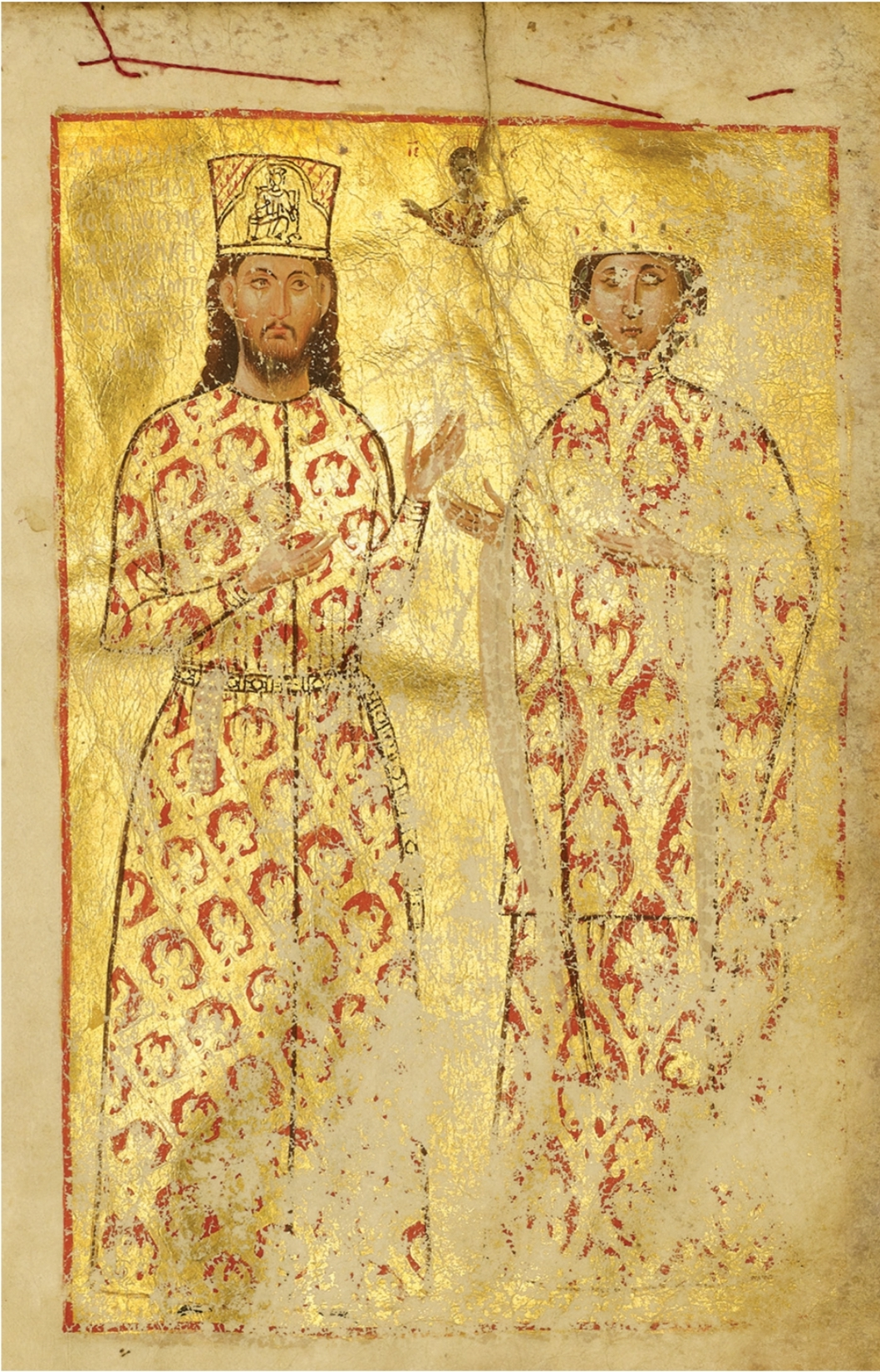
- Manuel Asanes and his wife Anna Doukaina Synadene
- Style: My lord sebastokrator (Δέσποτά μου σεβαστόκρατορ Your Majesty (Ἡ βασιλεία σου)
- Member of: Byzantine Imperial Family
- Appointer: Byzantine emperor
- Term length: Life tenure
- Formation: c. 1081
- First holder: Isaac Komnenos
- Final holder: Demetrios Kantakouzenos
- Abolished: 29 May 1453
- Succession: Second (After 1163); First

Sebastokrator (Medieval Greek: Σεβαστοκράτωρ, romanized: Sevastokrátor, lit. 'August Ruler', Byzantine Greek pronunciation: [sevastoˈkrator]; Bulgarian: севастократор, romanized: sevastokrator; Serbian: севастократор, romanized: sevastokrator), was a senior court title in the late Byzantine Empire. It was also used by other rulers whose states bordered the Empire or were within its sphere of influence (Bulgarian Empire, Serbian Empire). The word is a compound of sebastós (lit. 'venerable', the Greek equivalent of the Latin Augustus) and krátōr ('ruler', the same element as is found in autokrator, 'emperor'). The wife of a Sebastokrator was named sebastokratorissa (σεβαστοκρατόρισσα, sevastokratórissa) in Greek, sevastokratitsa (севастократица) in Bulgarian and sevastokratorica in Serbian.

== Eastern Roman Empire ==
The title was created by Emperor Alexios I Komnenos (r. 1081–1118) to honour his elder brother Isaac Komnenos. According to Anna Komnene, Alexios did this to raise Isaac above the rank of Caesar, which he had already promised to his brother-in-law, Nikephoros Melissenos. Anna Komnene compares the rank of sebastokratōr to "a second emperor", and also records that along with the Caesar a sebastokratōr was granted the right to wear a crown (but not the imperial diadem). During the Komnenian dynasty (1081–1185), the title continued to be the highest below that of emperor until 1163, when Emperor Manuel I created the title of despotes. During that period, it was given exclusively to members of the imperial family, chiefly younger sons of the emperor.

After the dismemberment of the Byzantine Empire by the Fourth Crusade in 1204, the title was adopted in the Latin Empire, the Empire of Nicaea, and the Bulgarian Empire. In Nicaea and the post-1261 restored Byzantine Empire, the title remained one of the highest court dignities, and was almost always restricted to members of the imperial family. The last known holder of the title was Demetrios Kantakouzenos, a ruler in the Peloponnese in the late 14th century.

According to the sources, the distinctive colour associated with the title was blue: the sebastokratōr′s ceremonial costume included blue stockings and blue boots. In circa 1260, according to George Akropolites, the sebastokratores who were members of the imperial family were distinguished from those who were not by having embroidered golden eagles on their shoes. By the time of pseudo-Kodinos in the mid-14th century, the insignia associated with the rank were a skiadion hat in red and gold, decorated with gold-wire embroideries, with a veil bearing the wearer's name and pendants identical to those of the despotēs. He wore a red tunic (rouchon) similar to the emperor's, but without the rizai decorations and the insignia of military power. His mantle (tamparion) was no longer known, but the stockings were blue; under John VI Kantakouzenos (r. 1347–1354), however, when the emperor raised his brothers-in-law Manuel and John Asanes to the rank, he permitted them to wear tamparia and stockings like those of the despotēs. The sebastokratōr's shoes and stockings were blue, with gold-embroidered eagles on red background; and his horse tack was also of blue, his saddle blanket featuring furthermore four red-embroidered eagles. His tent was white with blue decorations. The form of the domed skaranikon, on the other hand, for the sebastokratōr was unknown to pseudo-Kodinos. The sebastokratōr also had the prerogative of signing documents with a special blue ink.

== Bulgaria ==
Kaloyan inherited the title possibly from his father Aleksandar (d. after 1232), a son of Tsar Ivan Asen I of Bulgaria (r. 1189–1196).

== Serbia ==
This title was also adopted in the court of medieval Serbia, under the Nemanjić dynasty, the Serbian Kings and Emperors (1217–1346; 1346–1371).

== List of holders ==
=== Albania ===
- Andrea I Muzaka, Albanian nobleman, Sevastocrator & Marshal of Albania, c. 1279–1319.
- Paul Mataranga, Albanian nobleman, Sevastocrator
- Blasius Matarango (fl. 1358–67), Albanian nobleman, Sevastocrator
- Gjon Zenebishi, Albanian nobleman, Sevastocrator

=== Byzantium ===
- Isaac Komnenos (brother of Alexios I), 1081–1102/04.
- Andronikos Komnenos (son of Alexios I), 1102/04–1130/31
- Isaac Komnenos (son of Alexios I), 1118–a. 1152.
- Isaac Komnenos (son of John II), c. 1122–a. 1146.
- Andronikos Komnenos (son of John II), c. 1122–1142.
- Manuel I Komnenos, c.1122–1143.
- John Doukas, uncle of Isaac II Angelos, c. 1185–c. 1200.
- Stefan the First-Crowned, husband of Eudokia Angelina, c. 1190–1217.
- Alexios III Angelos, brother of Isaac II Angelos, named c. 1190–1195.
- Isaac Komnenos Vatatzes, son-in-law of Alexios III Angelos, c. 1195–1196.
- John Petraliphas, Byzantine, late 12th/early 13th century

==== Frankokratia ====
- Empire of Nicaea
  - Sabas Asidenos, sympetheros of Theodore I Laskaris, a. 1206–c. 1216
  - Nikephoros Kontostephanos, c. 1217.
  - Alexios Laskaris, brother of Theodore I Laskaris, a. 1207–1224.
  - Isaac Laskaris, brother of Theodore I Laskaris, b. 1221–1224.
  - George Laskaris, brother of Theodore I Laskaris, b. 1211–1224?.
  - Isaac Doukas Vatatzes, brother of John III Doukas Vatatzes, c. 1253- b. 1261.
  - John Palaiologos (brother of Michael VIII), 1259–1260.
  - Constantine Palaiologos (half-brother of Michael VIII), 1260–1271.
  - Constantine Tornikios, father-in-law of John Palaiologos, 1260–1274.
- Latin Empire
  - Conon de Béthune, regent for Peter II of Courtenay, c.1217– 1219.
- John Tornikios, relative of Constantine Tornikios, a. 1261.
- John I Doukas of Thessaly, husband of Anna Palaiologina Kantakouzene, c. 1272–1289.
- Constantine Doukas of Thessaly, son of Anna Palaiologina Kantakouzene, c. 1295–1303.
- Theodore Angelos, son of John I Doukas of Thessaly, c. 1295–c. 1299.
- John II Doukas of Thessaly, son-in-law of Andronikos II Palaiologos, c. 1315–1318.
- Stephen Gabrielopoulos, ruler of Thessaly, b. 1325–1332/33.
- Hrelja (fl. 1330s), semi-independent feudal lord in the region of northeastern Macedonia and Rila mountain, Byzantine magnate
- John Angelos, ruler of Thessaly, c. 1342–1348.
- Momchil, brigand in Rhodopes, 1344–1345.
- Manuel Komnenos Raul Asanes, brother-in-law of John VI Kantakouzenos, c. 1347–c. 1354.
- John Asanes, brother of Manuel Komnenos Raul Asanes, c. 1347–1355.
- Andronikos Asanes, son of Manuel Komnenos Raul Asanes, c. 1354.
- Nikephoros Kantakouzenos, relative of John VI Kantakouzenos, 1351–1355.
- Demetrios I Kantakouzenos, son of Matthew Kantakouzenos, 1357–c. 1383.

=== Bulgaria ===
- Strez (fl. 1207–1214), Bulgarian
- Aleksandar Asen (d. after 1232), Bulgarian prince
- Kaloyan Asen (fl. 1259), Vlacho-Bulgarian magnate, held Sredets (modern Sofia)
- Peter Asen (f. 1253), sebastokrator of Sredets, Bulgaria

=== Serbia ===
- Miroslav, Serbian prince of Hum, under his brother Great Prince Stefan Nemanjić (c. 12th century)
- Rastko, Serbian, also known as Saint Sava of Serbia, under his brother King Stefan Nemanjić II (c. 12th century)
- Jovan Oliver, Serbian, under Dušan the Mighty (r. 1331–1355)
- Branko Mladenović (fl. 1331–65), Serbian
- Dejan (fl. 1346-1356), Serbian magnate, held Žegligovo and Preševo, and the Upper Struma river with Velbužd (modern Kyustendil)
- Vlatko Paskačić, Serbian under the Mrnjavčevići (1366–1395)

== Gallery ==
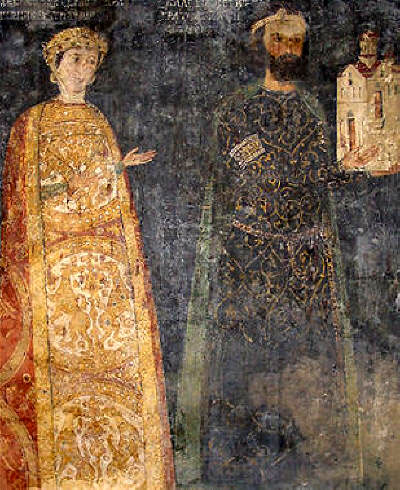
Donor portrait of the Vlacho-Bulgarian sebastokratōr Kaloyan Asan (Asen) and his wife Desislava, fresco from the Boyana Church (1259).

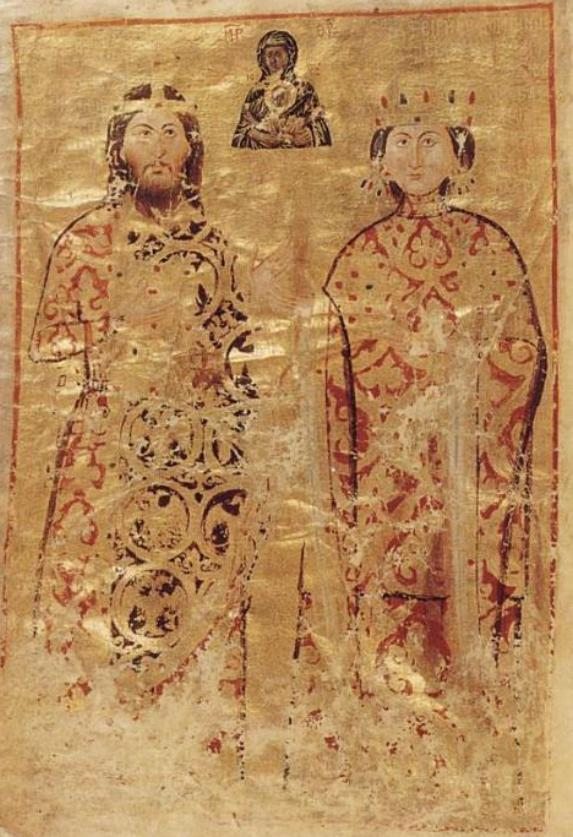
The sebastokratōr Constantine Palaiologos and his wife Eirene. Donor portrait from an early 14th-century monastery typikon.

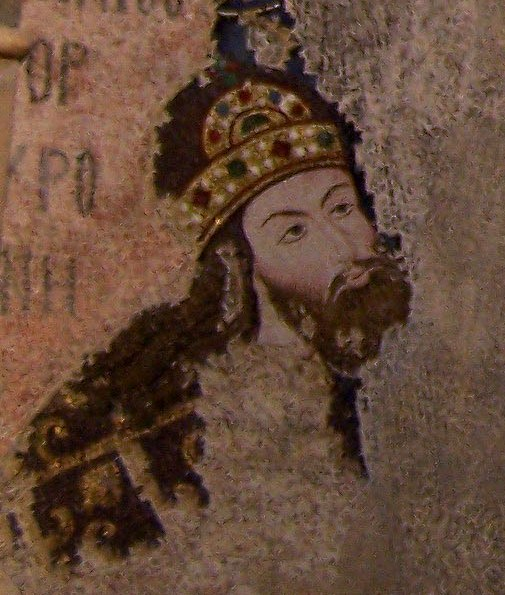
A Byzantine fresco in the Chora Church depicting the sebastokratōr Isaac Komnenos, son of Emperor Alexios I Komnenos.

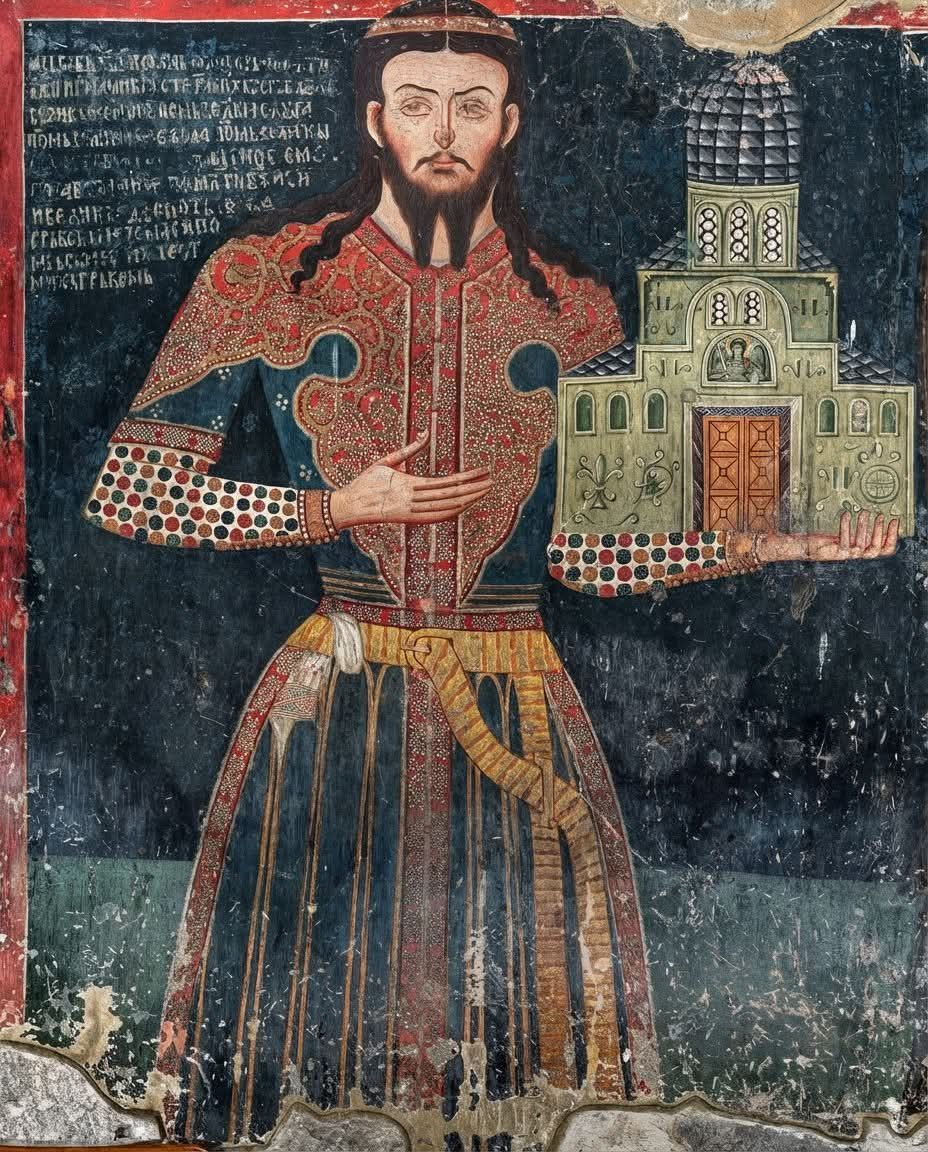
The Sevastokrator Jovan Oliver, fresco from the Lesnovo monastery.

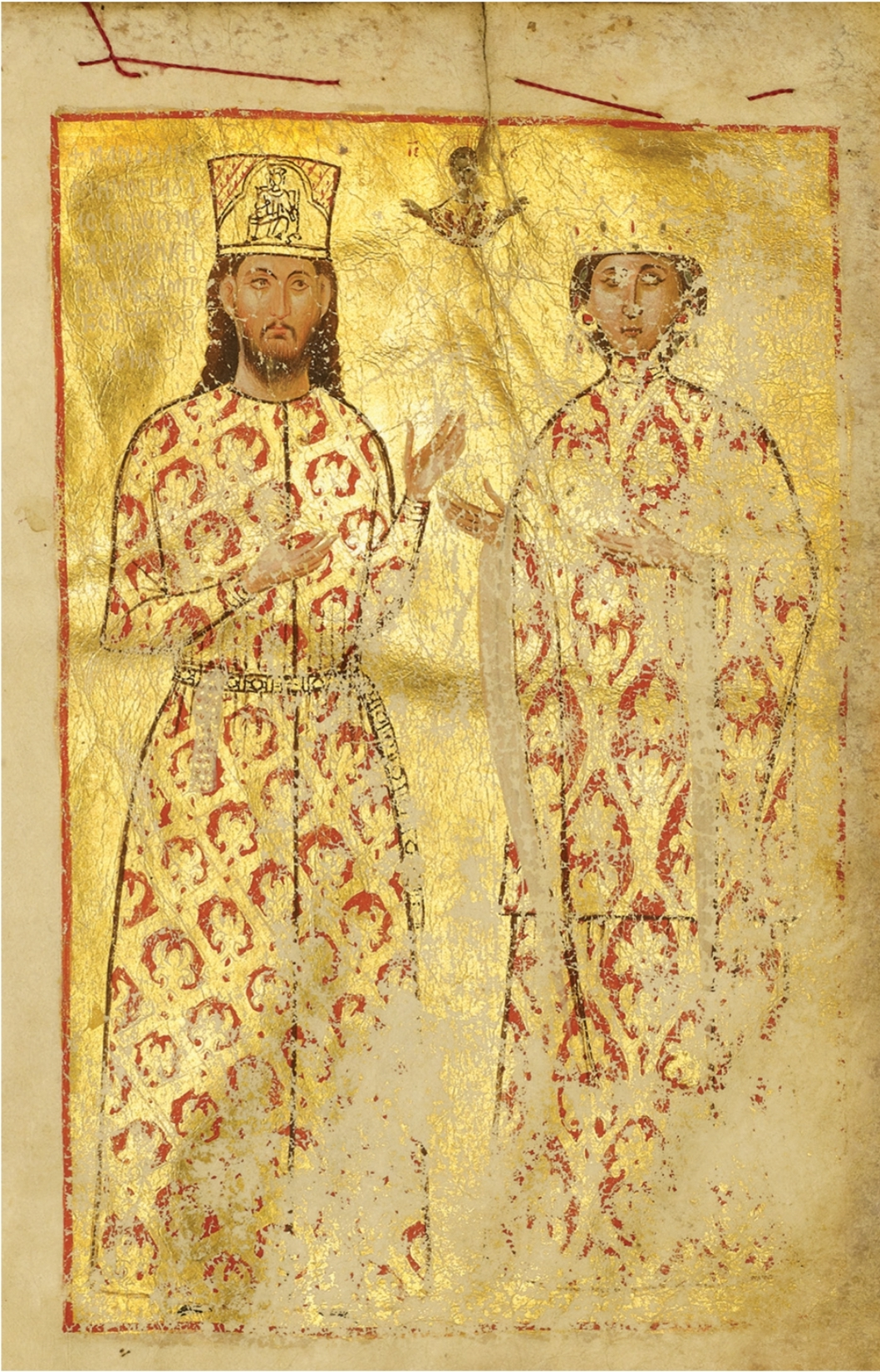
Manuel Asanes and his wife Anna Doukaina Synadene

== Sources ==
- Bakalov, Georgi; Kumanov, Milen (2003). "КАЛОЯН (неизв.-след 1259)". Електронно издание "История на България" (in Bulgarian). Sofia: Trud, Sirma. ISBN 954528613X.
- Ferjančić, Božidar (1968). "Севастократори у Византији" [Sebastocrators in Byzantium]. Zbornik Radova Vizantološkog Instituta. XI. Belgrade: Institute for Byzantine Studies of the Serbian Academy of Sciences and Arts: 141–192. ISSN 0584-9888.
- Ferjančić, Božidar (1970). "Севастократори и кесари у Српском царству" [Sebastocrators and Caesares in the Serbian Empire]. Зборник Филозофског факултета. Belgrade: 255–269.
- Kazhdan, Alexander, ed. (1991). The Oxford Dictionary of Byzantium. Oxford and New York: Oxford University Press. ISBN 0-19-504652-8.
- Macrides, Ruth (2007). George Akropolites: The History. Oxford: Oxford University Press. ISBN 978-0-19-921067-1.
- Parani, Maria G. (2003). Reconstructing the Reality of Images: Byzantine Material Culture and Religious Iconography (11th to 15th Centuries). Leiden: Brill. ISBN 978-90-04-12462-2.
- Verpeaux, Jean, ed. (1966). Pseudo-Kodinos, Traité des Offices (in French). Centre National de la Recherche Scientifique.
