= Great Vlachia =

Former province in Thessaly, Greece

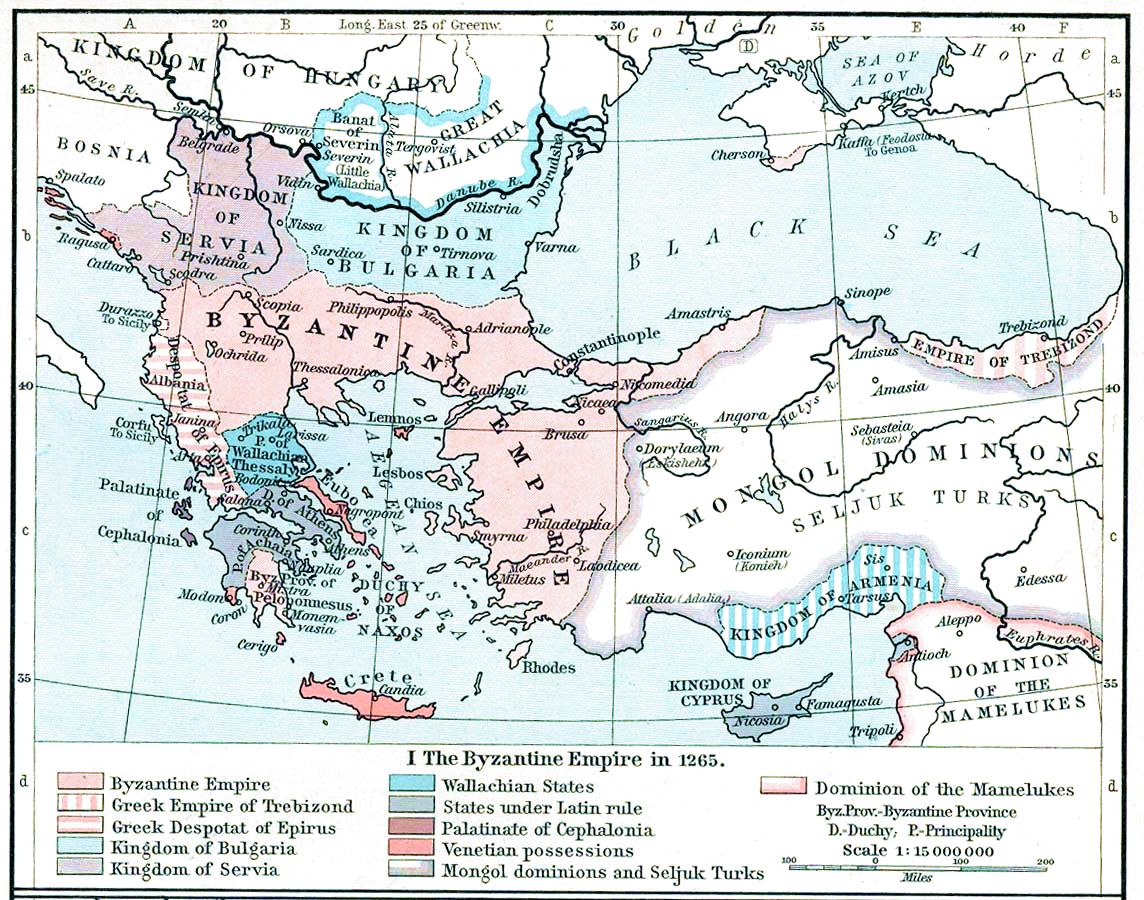
Map from William Robert Shepherd's Historical Atlas, showing the Balkans in ca. 1265, with Thessaly in dark blue, labelled "P. of Wallachian Thessaly"

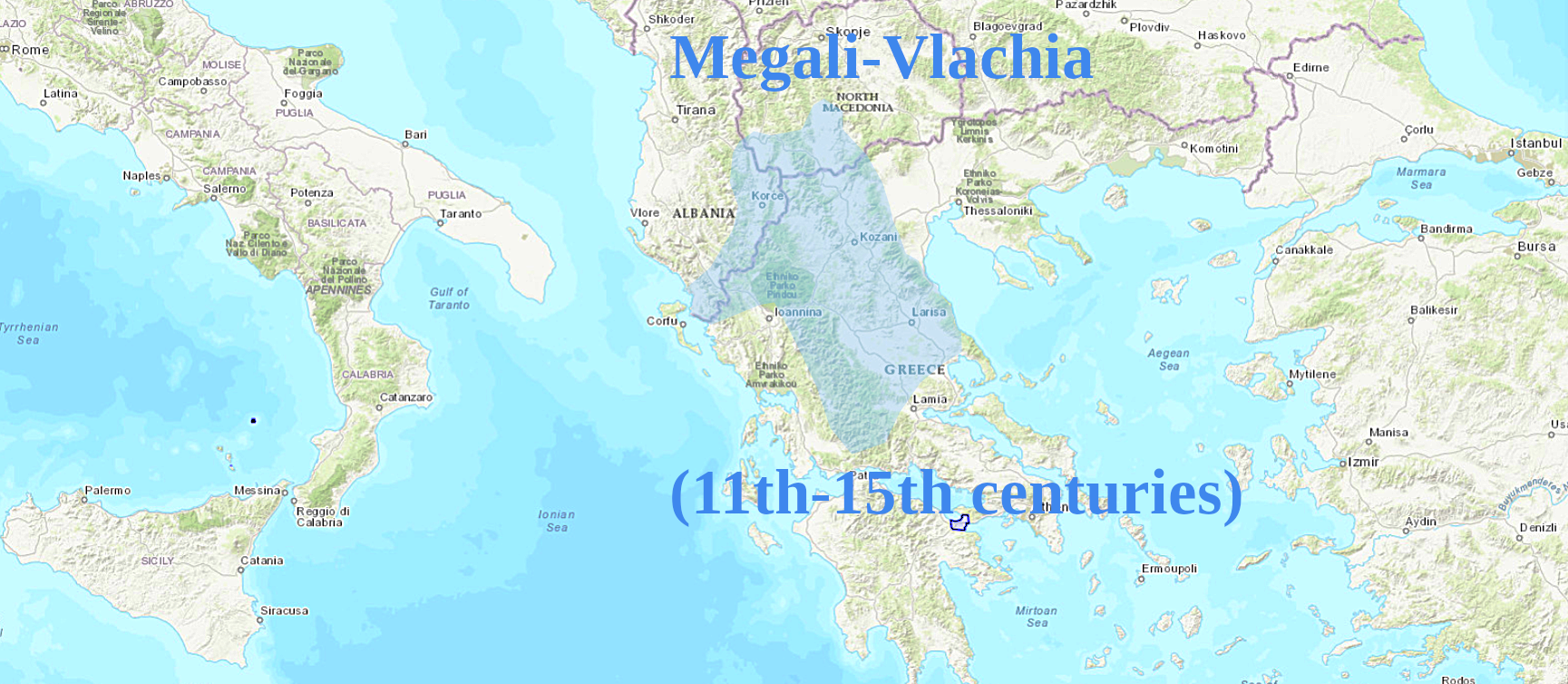
Megali-Vlachia (Great Vlachia, "Great Latinate Land") 11th-15th centuries

Great Vlachia (Aromanian: Vlãhia Mari; Greek: Μεγάλη Βλαχία, romanized: Megálē Vlachía), also simply known as Vlachia (Aromanian: Vlãhia; Greek: Βλαχία, romanized: Vlachía), was a province and region in southeastern Thessaly in the late 12th century, and was used to denote the entire region of Thessaly in the 13th and 14th centuries. The name derives from the Vlachs (Aromanians), who had lived across much of the area.

== Name ==
The name derives from the Aromanians or Vlachs, a chiefly transhumant ethnic group that lives in several mountainous areas of the Balkans, descended from ancient Romance-speaking populations mixed with the people from the Barbarian Invasions of Late Antiquity. The exact origin of the Thessalian and Epirote Vlachs has been a subject of dispute in recent times, chiefly from nationalist motivations: some Romanian historians claimed that the Vlachs had come from the area of modern Romania and settled in the region, rather than being autochthonous. In modern scholarship, it is generally accepted that the Vlachs descend from Latin settlers and native populations who adopted Latin in the Roman period. In the broadest sense, both Greek and Western sources of the later Middle Ages—like the French, Italian, and Aragonese versions of the Chronicle of the Morea, or the chroniclers Ramon Muntaner and Marino Sanudo Torsello—used "Vlachia" or similar names (Blaquie, Blaquia, Val[l]achia) to refer to all of Thessaly, from the Pindus mountains in the west to the Aegean Sea in the east, and from the area of Mount Olympus and Servia in the north to the towns of Zetouni (Lamia) and Neopatras (Ypati) in the south.

Thessalian Vlachia was apparently also known as "Vlachia in Hellas" (ἐν Ἑλλάδι Βλαχία), as well as "Great Vlachia" (Μεγάλη Βλαχία), to distinguish it from other Vlach-inhabited areas, "Upper Vlachia" in Epirus, and a "Little Vlachia" in Aetolia-Acarnania. The contemporary Byzantine historian Niketas Choniates however distinguishes "Great Vlachia" as a district near Meteora. "Vlachia", "Great Vlachia", and the other variants began to fall out of use for Thessaly at the turn of the 14th century, and with the emergence of Wallachia north of the Danube, from the 15th century the name was reserved for it.

== Thessalian Vlachs in the Middle Ages ==
The Vlachs of Thessaly first appear in Byzantine sources of the 11th century, like in the Strategikon of Kekaumenos and Anna Komnene's Alexiad. Kekaumenos, who wrote in the late 1070s, in particular stresses both their transhumance as well as their disdain of imperial authorities. Kekaumenos records a failed Vlach uprising of 1066, under the unwilling leadership of Nikoulitzas Delphinas, a relative of his and grandson of the original Nikoulitzas, whom Emperor Basil II (r. 976–1025) placed to rule over the Thessalian Vlachs. Anna Komnene reports a Vlach settlement near Mount Ossa in 1083, in connection with the campaign of her father, Alexios I Komnenos (r. 1081–1118), against the Normans.

The term 'Vlachia' first appears in the 12th century, when the Jewish traveller Benjamin of Tudela, who toured the area in 1166, recorded that the town of Zetouni (Lamia) was "situated at the foots of the hills of Vlachia". The term was evidently not simply a geographic or ethnic designation, for a chrysobull of Emperor Alexios III Angelos (r. 1195–1203) in 1198 includes the Provincia Valachie among the districts of Thessaly where Venetian merchants were granted exemptions, and the same information is repeated in the list of provinces granted to Boniface of Montferrat in the Partitio Romaniae of 1204. According to the Byzantinist George C. Soulis, from this information it appears that this late 12th-century Byzantine province of Vlachia "was situated in the Mount Othrys region, occupying the area lying between the towns of Lamia, Domokos and Halmyros".

Despite their prominence in Thessaly, the Vlachs never came to rule over the region, submitting instead to the various Greek, Latin, and later Serb rulers. A toparch of Great Vlachia is mentioned by Niketas Choniates for when the region became part of the Kingdom of Thessalonica after the Fourth Crusade, but his identity is unknown, with modern scholars proposing the German crusader Berthold II von Katzenelnbogen, the Vlach chieftain Taronas, or the Greek magnate Constantine Maliasenos. After the capture of Thessaly by the Despotate of Epirus, the Vlachs were used by the Epirotes as elite troops against their rivals; the 13th-century scholar George Pachymeres comments on the bravery of the Megalovlachitai in the army of the ruler of Epirus, Michael II Komnenos Doukas (r. ca. 1230–1268). Michael's bastard son, John, was married to a Vlach, the daughter of the chieftain Taronas, and his Vlach troops—it is unclear whether they were regular forces or perhaps a private army raised from his estates—played a prominent role in the Battle of Pelagonia in 1259. When Michael II died in c. 1268, his realm was divided, and John became ruler of Thessaly, with his capital at Neopatras. Western authors often used the term "Vlachia" to refer to the autonomous Thessalian realm of John Doukas and his heirs. Part of Thessaly, however, around Demetrias, Velestino, Halmyros, and Pharsalos, had remained in the hands of the Nicaean Empire, and after 1261 the restored Byzantine Empire, for several years after Pelagonia. This district was governed by a "kephale of Great Vlachia", a post held in 1276 by the pinkernes Raoul Komnenos.

After the conquest of large parts of the Byzantine Empire in the mid-1340s, the Serbian ruler Stefan Dushan was crowned emperor in 1346, founding the Serbian Empire. In 1347–1348 he and his general Preljub extended Serbian control over Epirus and Thessaly. Afterwards, Stefan Dushan claimed the titles, in Latin, of imperator Raxie et Romanie, dispotus Lartae et Blachie comes ("Emperor of Rascia and Romania [Byzantine Empire], Despot of Arta and Count of Vlachia"). Under Serbian rule, the capital of the region moved to Trikala.

== See also ==
- Aromanians in Greece
- List of traditional Greek place names
- History of the Aromanians
- Wallachia (disambiguation)

== Sources ==
- Fine, John V. A. Jr. (1991) [1983]. The Early Medieval Balkans: A Critical Survey from the Sixth to the Late Twelfth Century. Ann Arbor: University of Michigan Press. ISBN 0-472-08149-7.
- Fine, John V. A. Jr. (1994) [1987]. The Late Medieval Balkans: A Critical Survey from the Late Twelfth Century to the Ottoman Conquest. Ann Arbor, Michigan: University of Michigan Press. ISBN 978-0-472-10079-8.
- Kazhdan, Alexander, ed. (1991). The Oxford Dictionary of Byzantium. Oxford and New York: Oxford University Press. ISBN 0-19-504652-8.
- Nicol, D. M. (1962). "The Greeks and the Union of the Churches the Report of Ogerius, Protonotarius of Michael VIII Palaiologos, in 1280". Proceedings of the Royal Irish Academy, Section C. 63: 1–16. JSTOR 25505111.
- Osswald, Brendan (2007). "The Ethnic Composition of Medieval Epirus". In Ellis, Steven G.; Klusáková, Lud'a (eds.). Imagining Frontiers, Contesting Identities. Pisa: Edizioni Plus – Pisa University Press. pp. 125–154. ISBN 978-88-8492-466-7.
- Soulis, George C. (1953). "Βλαχία-Μεγάλη Βλαχία-Ἡ ἐν Ἑλλάδι Βλαχία. Συμβολὴ εἰς τὴν ἱστορικὴν γεωγραφίαν τῆς μεσαιωνικῆς Θεσσαλίας" [Vlachia—Great Vlachia—Vlachia in Hellas. Contribution to the historical geography of medieval Thessaly]. Γέρας Αντωνίου Κεραμοπούλου. Athens. pp. 489–497.
- Soulis, George C. (1963). "Thessalian Vlachia". Zbornik Radova Vizantološkog Instituta. 8 (1): 271–273.
- Stavridou-Zafraka, Alkmini (2000). "Μεγάλη και Μικρή Βλαχία". Τρικαλινά. 20: 171–179.
