= Kephale (Byzantine Empire) =

Term for provincial and local governors

In the late Byzantine Empire, the term kephale (Greek: κεφαλή, romanized: kephalē, lit. 'head') was used to denote local and provincial governors.

It entered use in the second half of the 13th century, and was derived from the colloquial language. Consequently, it never became an established title or rank of the Byzantine imperial hierarchy, but remained a descriptive term. In essence, the kephalē replaced the Komnenian-era doux as the civil and military governor of a territorial administrative unit, known as a katepanikion (κατεπανίκιον, katepaníkion), but also termed a kephalatikion (κεφαλατίκιον, kephalatíkion). In size, these provinces were small compared to the earlier themata, and could range from a few villages surrounding the kephale's seat (a kastron, "fortress"), to an entire island. This arrangement was also adopted by the Second Bulgarian Empire (as Bulgarian: кефалия, kefaliya) and Serbian Empire (as Serbian: кефалиja, kefalija).

In the 14th century, superior kephalai were appointed (katholikai kephalai, "universal heads") overseeing a group of provinces under their respective [merikai] kephalai ("[partial] heads"). The former were usually kin of the emperor or members of the senior aristocratic clans. By the late 14th century, with the increasing decentralization of the Empire and the creation of appanages in the form of semi-independent despotates, these senior posts vanished.

== Sources ==
- Bartusis, Mark C. (1991). "Kephale". In Kazhdan, Alexander (ed.). The Oxford Dictionary of Byzantium. Oxford and New York: Oxford University Press. p. 1122. ISBN 0-19-504652-8.
