= Božidar Ferjančić =

Serbian historian

- Born: 17 February 1929; Belgrade, Kingdom of Serbs, Croats and Slovenes
- Died: 28 June 1998 (aged 69); Belgrade, FR Yugoslavia
- Occupation(s): Historian, academic

Božidar Ferjančić (Serbian Cyrillic: Божидар Ферјанчић; 17 February 1929 – 28 June 1998) was a Serbian historian, a specialist in medieval Serbian history and the later Byzantine empire. He was member of the Serbian Academy of Sciences and Arts.

== Biography ==
Ferjančić was born in Belgrade, at the time part of the Kingdom of Yugoslavia. Ferjančić graduated with distinction from the Faculty of Philosophy at the University of Belgrade in History in 1953 and after additional study at the same university, he received his doctorate in 1960 with a dissertation entitled Despots in Byzantium and the Lands of the South Slavs. He then taught at the University of Belgrade's Faculty of Philosophy. He advanced rapidly and in 1965 was made associate professor and in 1970 professor. In 1973 he assumed the chairmanship of the Institute for Byzantine Studies after George Ostrogorsky's retirement, a post Ferjančić occupied until his death in 1998. In 1977 he became the director of the institute, a post held by Ostrogorsky before he died in 1976. Ferjančić was made corresponding member of the Serbian Academy of Sciences and Arts in 1978 and a regular member in 1988. He died on 28 June (Vidovdan) in Belgrade.

== Work ==
- Vizantinski i srpski Ser u XIV stoleću. Belgrade. 1994.
- Les Albanais dans les sources Byzantines. Belgrade. 1988.
- Plemstva u epirskoj državi pre polovine XIII veka. Belgrade. 1986.
- "On the Parish Clergy in Late Byzantium". ZRVI. 22. Belgrade: SANU. 1983.
- "Quelques significations du mot stratiote dans les chartes de basse Byzance". ZRVI. 21. Belgrade: SANU. 1982.
- "Vizantijski pečat iz Sirmijuma". ZRVI. 21. Belgrade: SANU. 1982.
- Posedina vizantinskih provinciskih manastira u gradovima. Belgrade. 1980.
- Tesalija u XIII i XIV veku [Thessaly in the 13th and 14th century]. Belgrade: SANU. 1974.
- "Севастократори и кесари у Српском царству" [Sebastocrators and Caesares in the Serbian Empire]. Зборник Филозофског факултета. 1970.
- "Sevastokratori u Vizantiji" [Sebastocrators in Byzantium]. ZRVI. 11. Belgrade: SANU. 1968.
- Vizantija i Južni Sloveni [Byzantium and South Slavs]. Belgrade. 1966.
- Kada je umro Mihailo II Andjeo? [When did Michael II Angelos die?]. Belgrade. 1966.
- Despoti u Vizantiji i južnoslovenskim zemljama [Despots in Byzantium and the South Slavic Lands]. Posebna izdanja. Vol. 336. Belgrade: SANU. 1960.
- Ферјанчић, Божидар, ed. (1959). Византиски извори за историју народа Југославије. Vol. 2. Београд: Византолошки институт.
- "O despotskim poveljama" [Actes de despotes]. ZRVI. 4. Belgrade: SANU. 1956.
- Barišic, Franjo; Ferjancic, Božidar (1981). "Vesti Demetrija Chomatjana o "vlasti Druguvita"" [Informations de Demetrios Chomatianos sur le "pouvoir des Dragoubitai"]. Zbornik radova Vizantoloskog Instituta: 41–58.
- Ferjančić, Božidar (1984). "Invasions et installations des Slaves dans les Balkans". Villes et peuplement dans l'Illyricum protobyzantin. Actes du colloque de Rome (12-14 mai 1982). Publications de l'École Française de Rome. École Française de Rome.
- "Solunski car Manojlo Andjeo (1230–1237)". Zbornik Filozofskog fakulteta. XIV.
- Archiepiskop Danilo II i Vizantija [Archbishop Danilo II and Byzantium].
