= Carlo Tocco =

Carlo Tocco was the name of several members of the medieval and modern Italian Tocco family. It may refer to:

- Carlo I Tocco (1374/1377–1429), Despot of Epirus
- Carlo II Tocco (?–1448), Despot of Epirus
- Carlo III Tocco (1464–1518), Titular Despot of Epirus
- Carlo de Tocco (1592–1674), Prince of Montemiletto, grandson of Leonardo IV Tocco
- Carlo Antonio Tocco (1668–1701), Prince of Montemiletto, Titular Prince of Achaea
- Carlo II di Tocco Cantelmo Stuart (1756–1823), Prince of Montemiletto, Titular Prince of Achaea
- Carlo III di Tocco Cantelmo Stuart (1827–1884), Prince of Montemiletto, Titular Prince of Achaea
