= Leonardo Tocco =

Leonardo Tocco was the name of several members of the medieval and modern Italian Tocco family. It may refer to:

- Leonardo I Tocco (?–1375/1377), Count Palatine of Cephalonia and Zakynthos
- Leonardo II Tocco (1374/1377–1429), Lord of Zakynthos
- Leonardo III Tocco (c. 1436–1503), Despot of Epirus
- Leonardo IV Tocco (c. 1510–1564), Titular Despot of Epirus
- Leonardo V Tocco (1591–1641), Titular Despot of Epirus
- Leonardo VI Tocco (?–1670), son of Antonio Tocco
- Leonardo VII Tocco (1698–1776), Titular Prince of Achaea
