= Antonio Tocco =

Prince of Montemiletto

- Prince of Montemiletto (Note: Antonio's full titles among the Italian nobility were Prince of Montemiletto, Prince of Achaea, Count of Monteaperti, Baron of Apice, Tinchiano, Grumo, Montefalcione, Serra, Manocalzati and Calabritto.)

Prince of Achaea (Neapolitan nobility)
- Reign: 4 November 1642 – 5 March 1678
- Successor: Carlo Antonio Tocco

Despot of Epirus Count Palatine of Cephalonia and Zakynthos (titular)
- Reign: 6 February 1641 – 4 November 1642
- Predecessor: Leonardo V Tocco
- Born: 16 August 1618; Naples
- Died: 5 March 1678 (aged 59); Naples
- Spouse: Donna Porzia di Tocco
- Issue: Francesca Tocco; Leonardo VI Tocco; Carlo Tocco
- Dynasty: Tocco
- Father: Leonardo V Tocco
- Mother: Francesca Pignatelli

Don Antonio Di Tocco (16 August 1618 – 5 March 1678) was the last titular Despot of Epirus and Count Palatine of Cephalonia and Zakynthos, claiming these titles from the death of his father Leonardo V Tocco in 1641 until he abandoned them in 1642, substituting them for the Neapolitan title of Prince of Achaea, which he used until his death in 1678.

Antonio's change in titulature is owed to his descent in the female line from Centurione II Zaccaria, who had reigned more than two centuries before Antonio assumed this style of title. He did this in exchange for his patrimonial titles of Despot of Epirus and Count Palatine of Cephalonia and Zakynthos. This was not the same sovereign princely title held by rulers of the Principality of Achaea, but a Neapolitan nobility title to honour him as a descendant.

The change in titulature was respected by his contemporaries, and confirmed through a diploma by Philip IV of Spain on 4 November 1642. Antonio also worked to further increase his family's standing in the Italian nobility, acquiring various fiefs in Italy through purchasing them and through his marriage to his relative, Donna Porzia di Tocco, which ensured that he inherited various fiefs from his father-in-law, Carlo di Tocco, including the town of Montemiletto. From Antonio's time onwards, the Tocco family mainly identified themselves through their ownership of Montemiletto, titling themselves as 'Princes of Montemiletto'.

== Biography ==
Antonio Tocco was the third son of Leonardo V Tocco, titular Despot of Epirus and Count Palatine of Cephalonia and Zakynthos, and the eldest to reach adulthood, thus being the heir to his father's titular claims to lands in Greece, and to the fiefs his family had acquired in Italy since the loss of their Greek lands; Refrancore, Apice and Tinchiano. Antonio was born in Naples on 16 August 1618. His mother was Francesca Pignatelli, daughter of the Neapolitan patrician Cesare Pignatelli.

Given that Leonardo V Tocco had not written a will by the time of his death on 24 January 1641, Antonio's rights as his heir had to be confirmed by the Gran Corte della Vicaria, the greatest court in the Kingdom of Naples. Antonio was confirmed as heir through a decree on 6 February 1641.

On 4 November 1642, Antonio was granted through diploma the title Prince of Achaea, within the Neapolitan nobility, by Philip IV of Spain. The assumption of the title of Prince of Achaea was in exchange for his patrimonial Greek titles, with Antonio and his descendants ceasing to use the titles of Despot of Epirus and Count Palatine of Cephalonia and Zakynthos.

Antonio did not have a legitimate claim to the original sovereign princely title, however the Tocco were heirs of Thomas Palaiologos (1409–1465) in the female line, twice broken, and therefore descendants of Catherine Zaccaria. Through coercion, Thomas had married Catherine, a daughter of Centurione II Zaccaria, Prince of Achaea, and saw to it that he would inherit the territories of the principality upon Centurione's death by forcing him to ignore his legitimate heir, John Asen Zaccaria. The last fully documented and certain male-line descendants of Thomas Palaiologos died off in the early 16th century (Note: After Thomas's death in 1465, his claims were taken up by his eldest son, Andreas Palaiologos, who died in 1502. Andreas is commonly believed to not have left any descendants. If Andreas was childless, his heir would have been his younger brother, Manuel Palaiologos, who had moved back to Constantinople and lived under Ottoman rule. Manuel died at some point in the reign of Sultan Bayezid II (r. 1481–1512). Manuel's only documented son to reach adulthood, named Andreas Palaiologos after Manuel's brother, converted to Islam and died in the reign of Suleiman the Magnificent (r. 1520–1566). Manuel's son is not believed to have had children of his own. Though later members of the family are attested, the abundance of people unrelated to the imperial dynasty who bore the name, and forgers, makes the lineage of any later Palaiologoi uncertain and questionable.) and the Tocco family were descended from Thomas' eldest daughter, Helena, and her middle daughter, Milica Branković.

In 1630, Antonio married his relative, Donna Porzia di Tocco, at Naples. When Antonio's father-in-law, Carlo de Tocco, a grandson of Leonardo IV Tocco, died in 1674, Antonio inherited his titles, further engraining the senior line of the Tocco family into the Italian nobility. From 1674 onwards, Antonio added 'Prince of Montemiletto, Count of Monteaperti and Baron of Grumo, Montefalcione, Serra and Manocalzati' to his titles. From Antonio's time and onwards, the Tocco family mainly identified themselves through their ownership of Montemiletto. Antonio had added to the family lands before this point as well, having purchased the barony of Calabritto in 1665 from Girolamo d’Aquino, the Prince of Pietrelcina.

Antonio died in Naples on 5 March 1678.

== Family ==
With his wife Donna Porzia di Tocco, Antonio had three children:

- Francesca Tocco (3 October 1637 – ?), daughter who died in infancy.
- Leonardo VI Tocco (? – 26 September 1670), the eldest son. Antonio and Leonardo appear to have quarrelled, as Antonio disinherited him from most of his titles in 1658 and 1666. In any event, Leonardo predeceased Antonio. Upon Antonio's death in 1678, his titles were inherited by Leonardo's son, Carlo Antonio Tocco.
- Carlo Tocco (? – 25 April 1710), son who became known under the titles Prince of Sant'Arcangelo and Duke of Sicignano, titles that had not existed previously.

== Notes ==
Antonio Tocco Tocco dynasty Born: 16 August 1618 Died: 5 March 1678
Titles in pretence
Preceded by Leonardo V Tocco	— TITULAR — Despot of Epirus; 1641–1642	Title abandoned
Preceded by Leonardo V Tocco	— TITULAR — Count Palatine of Cephalonia and Zakynthos; 1641–1642	Title abandoned
