= Carlo II di Tocco Cantelmo Stuart =

Prince of Montemiletto

- Prince of Montemiletto (Note: Carlo's full titles among the Italian nobility were Prince of Montemiletto, Duke of Apice, Duke of Popoli, Count of Monteaperti, Baron of Fontanarosa, Montefalcione, Grumo, Roccavallescura, Serra and Pratola.)

Prince of Achaea (Neapolitan nobility)
- Reign: 21 February 1796 – 19 July 1823
- Predecessor: Restaino di Tocco Cantelmo Stuart
- Successor: Francesco di Tocco Cantelmo Stuart
- Born: 7 March 1756; Naples
- Died: 19 July 1823 (aged 67); Naples
- Spouse: Maria Antonia Carafa Cantelmo Stuart
- Issue: Maria Camilla di Tocco; Teresa di Tocco; Maria Carmela di Tocco; Leonardo di Tocco; Gennaro di Tocco; Maria Maddalena di Tocco; Giovanni Battista di Tocco; Francesco di Tocco
- Dynasty: Tocco
- Father: Restaino di Tocco Cantelmo Stuart
- Mother: Maria Camilla Cybo Malaspina

Don Carlo II di Tocco Cantelmo Stuart (Note: By the time Carlo II di Tocco Cantelmo Stuart became the head of the Tocco family there had been three previous heads of the Tocco family with the name Carlo: Carlo I Tocco, Carlo II Tocco and Carlo III Tocco. Through this it follows that he could accurately be considered Carlo IV Tocco. Rather than being enumerated as Carlo IV, the later Tocchi enumerated themselves as princes of Montemiletto, Carlo II being the second Carlo of the Tocco family to be prince of Montemiletto, after his matrilineal descendant Carlo de Tocco.) (7 March 1756 – 19 July 1823), or Carlo di Tocco for short, was an 18th/19th-century Italian noble, serving as the Prince of Montemiletto and the titular Prince of Achaea, among other titles, from the death of his father Restaino di Tocco Cantelmo Stuart in 1796 to his own death in 1823. In addition to holding various fiefs throughout Italy, Carlo also rose to prominent positions within the Kingdom of Naples and its successor state, the Kingdom of the Two Sicilies. In 1808, he came one of the earliest knights of the Royal Order of the Two-Sicilies and from 1821 to 1823, he served as a Counsellor of State in the Kingdom of the Two Sicilies.

== Biography ==
Carlo II di Tocco Cantelmo Stuart was born in Naples on 7 March 1756, as the eldest son of Restaino di Tocco Cantelmo Stuart, Prince of Montemiletto and titular Prince of Achaea, and the Italian noblewoman Maria Camilla Cybo Malaspina, Princess of Massa and Carrara. Upon Restaino's death on 21 February 1796, Carlo inherited his father's titles, including not only Montemiletto but also various other fiefs throughout Italy, and claims.

In 1798, Carlo lost the fief of Refrancore due to Piedmont in northern Italy being annexed by the French First Republic in the Italian campaigns of the French Revolutionary Wars. Refrancore was one of the first fiefs the Tocco family had come to possess in Italy following their exile from their lands in Greece, having been granted to Carlo's ancestor Leonardo IV Tocco in the 16th century. Carlo rose to high positions in the Kingdom of Naples and its later successor state, the Kingdom of the Two Sicilies. On 22 October 1808, Carlo became a knight of the Royal Order of the Two-Sicilies, which had been founded just a few months prior. Carlo served as a Counsellor of State in the Kingdom of the Two Sicilies from 23 July 1821 to 14 May 1823.

Carlo married the Italian noblewoman Maria Antonia Carafa Cantelmo Stuart on 2 June 1779 in Naples. She predeceased her husband, committing suicide in Florence on 29 January 1823.

Carlo died on 19 July 1823 in Naples.

== Family ==
With his wife Maria Antonia Carafa Cantelmo Stuart, Carlo II di Tocco Cantelmo Stuart had eight children:

- Maria Camilla di Tocco Cantelmo Stuart (18 July 1780 – 6 November 1854), daughter. Married the nobleman Giovanni Battista Pescara di Diano, Duke of Bovalino, mother to the four children Maria Antonia (†), Maria (Duchess of Bovalino, married Giovanni Francesco Morra, Prince of Morra), Giuseppe and Carlo.
- Teresa di Tocco Cantelmo Stuart (4 October 1781 – 9 June 1832), daughter. Married the nobleman Giuseppe Serra, Duke of Cassano, mother to the four children Giulia, Maria Antonia, Laura and Luigi.
- Maria Carmela di Tocco Cantelmo Stuart (18 January 1783 – ?), daughter who died in infancy.
- Leonardo di Tocco Cantelmo Stuart (3 August 1784 – 21 January 1828), son. Renounced his rights to the family titles (though granted the courtesy title 'Duke of Popoli').
- Gennaro di Tocco Cantelmo Stuart (7 November 1785 – 11 March 1842), son. Renounced his rights to the family titles (though granted the courtesy title 'Count of Monteaperti').
- Maria Maddalena di Tocco Cantelmo Stuart (10 December 1786 – 12 March 1850), daughter. Married the nobleman Francesco Capece Galeota, Duke of Regina, mother to the five children Maria Caterina, Maria Antonia, Luigi, Camilla and Carlo.
- Giovanni Battista di Tocco Cantelmo Stuart (4 February 1788 – ?), son who died in infancy.
- Francesco di Tocco Cantelmo Stuart (18 November 1790 – 16 April 1877), son, heir to Carlo's titles.
