= Tocco family =

Italian noble family

Tocco
- Coat of arms of the family
- Country: Kingdom of Sicily (Naples); Despotate of Epirus; Papal States; Holy Roman Empire; Kingdom of the Two Sicilies; Kingdom of Italy
- Founded: 11th/12th century (Noble family); 14th century (Greek branch)
- Founder: Ugolino Tocco (Noble family); Guglielmo Tocco (Greek branch)
- Final ruler: Leonardo III Tocco
- Final head: Carlo III di Tocco Cantelmo Stuart
- Titles: List: Despot of Epirus; Count Palatine of Cephalonia and Zakynthos; Prince of Achaea (Neapolitan nobility); Prince of Montemiletto; Duke of Apice; Duke of Lefkada; Duke of Popoli; Count of Monteaperti; Lord of Refrancore; Lord of Varnazza; Lord of Vonitsa; Baron of Apice; Baron of Calabritto; Baron of Fontanarosa; Baron of Grumo; Baron of Manocalzati; Baron of Montefalcione; Baron of Nocelle; Baron of Pratola; Baron of Roccavallescura; Baron of Serra; Baron of Tigliola; Baron of Tinchiano; Baron of Tipogaldo
- Traditions: Roman Catholicism
- Heirlooms: Foot of St. Anne
- Dissolution: 1884 (Note: Several sources give the date of the family's extinction as 1908, the death of Carlo Capece Galeota, duca di Regina. Though Capece Galeota had inherited the titles of the Tocco lineage, he was a matrilineal descendant and thus not part of the family proper.)
- Deposition: 1479

The House of Tocco (pl. Tocchi, Ancient Greek: Τόκκος, romanized: Tókkos pl. Τόκκοι, Tokkoi) was an Italian noble family from Benevento that came to prominence in the late 14th and 15th centuries, when they ruled various territories in western Greece as Counts Palatine of Cephalonia and Zakynthos and Despots of Epirus. During their brief period of rule in Greece, they were one of the most ambitious and able Latin dynasties in the region, and were one of the few to leave descendants lasting nearly until modern times, in which they claimed to represent the senior matrilineal heirs of the Palaiologos dynasty.

The earliest known members of the family are recorded in the 12th century, in Benevento, though Tocco family genealogies claimed that they originated much earlier, with forged connections to ancient Gothic kings Theodoric the Great and Totila, as well as to the ancient Epirote king Pyrrhus. Members of the family held various prominent offices during the rule of the Hohenstaufen and Angevin dynasties in the Kingdom of Sicily. As a result of the family's loyalty to the Angevin princes in Greece, such as the titular Latin emperors Philip I of Taranto and Robert of Taranto, Leonardo I Tocco was rewarded c. 1357 with the grant of the County Palatine of Cephalonia and Zakynthos, islands off the western coast of Greece.

Leonardo I's son and successor, Carlo I Tocco, became Despot of Epirus in 1411, granted by the Eastern Roman Emperor, as the favored successor of the previous despot, Esau de' Buondelmonti. Through a series of military campaigns, Carlo I reunified Epirus, which had been politically fragmented due to invasion by the Serbian Empire and Albanian tribes in the previous century, and subsequent infighting by local Albanian princes. Most of Carlo I's conquests were lost during the reign of his successor, Carlo II Tocco, due to invasions by the Ottoman Empire. The Tocco lost the despotate and their other holdings in Greece in 1479, during the reign of Carlo II's successor Leonardo III Tocco. Leonardo III was one of the last independent Latin rulers in Greece, and the last to hold lands on the Greek mainland.

Leonardo III escaped into exile in the Kingdom of Naples, where he brought the foot of St. Anne, mother of the Virgin Mary, and placed it in his private chapel. It was so highly regarded that his residence became known as the Palazzo del Santo Piede. He also unsuccessfully attempted to gain support for a military expedition to recover his lands in Greece.

Over the following centuries, the Tocco once more became part of the Italian nobility, gaining various titles through marriages and purchases. Leonardo III's descendants continued to claim the title of Despot of Epirus and comital until the first half of the 17th century, when both were exchanged for a new grant within the Neapolitan nobility by the King of Spain.

This occurred when Antonio Tocco requested to be granted the title of Prince of Achaea in 1642, in exchange for his patrimonial titles as Despot of Epirus and Count Palatine of Cephalonia and Zakynthos; although the title granted was not the same princely title held by rulers of the Principality of Achaea, but a new grant within the Neapolitan nobility title with the same territorial designation.

Nonetheless, from the 17th century onwards, the title most commonly used by the heads of the family was that of Prince of Montemiletto. The family went extinct with the death of its last member, Carlo III di Tocco Cantelmo Stuart, in 1884, and their Capece Galeota heirs became extinct as well by the first half of the 20th century.

== History ==
=== Origins ===
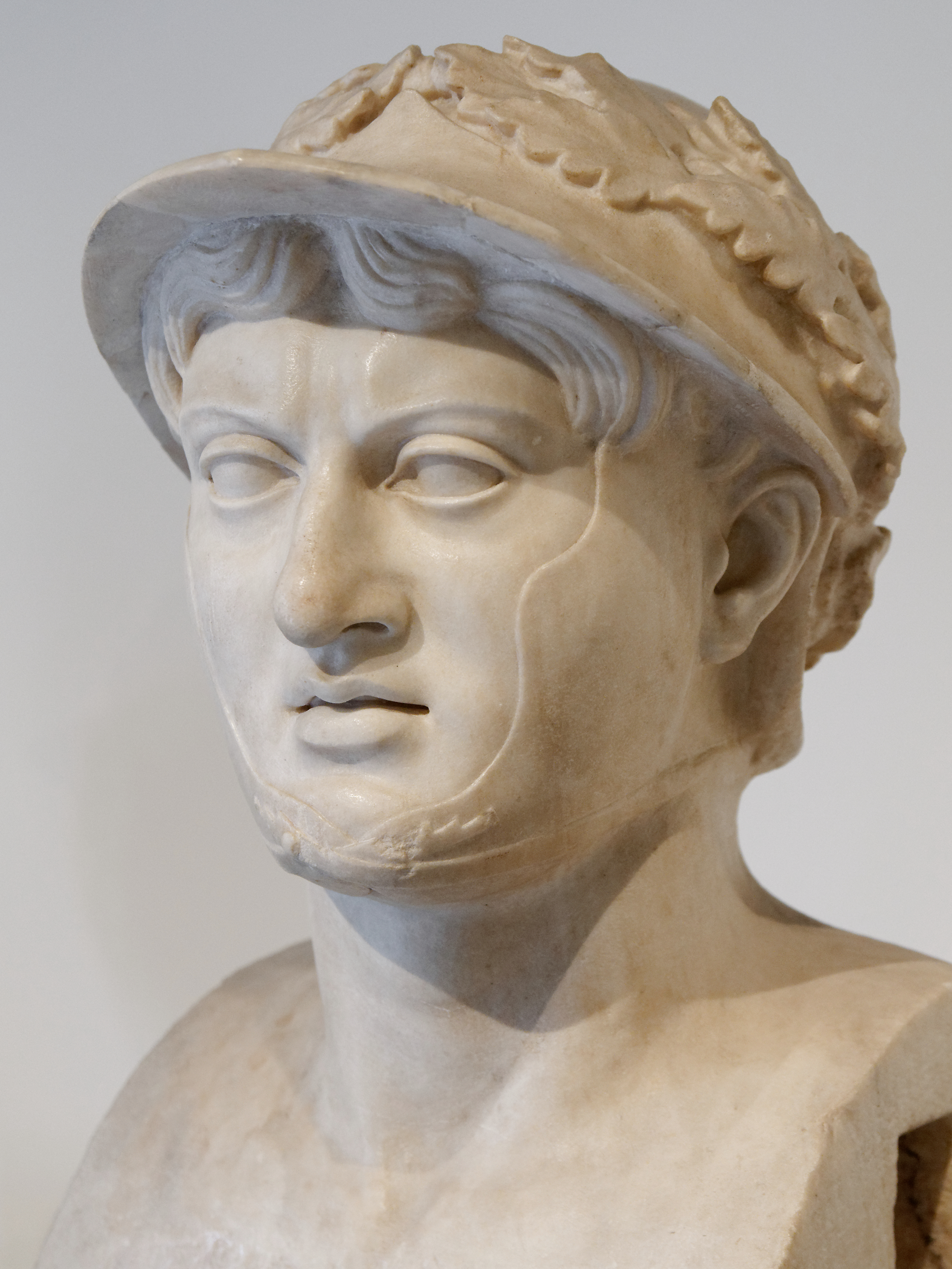
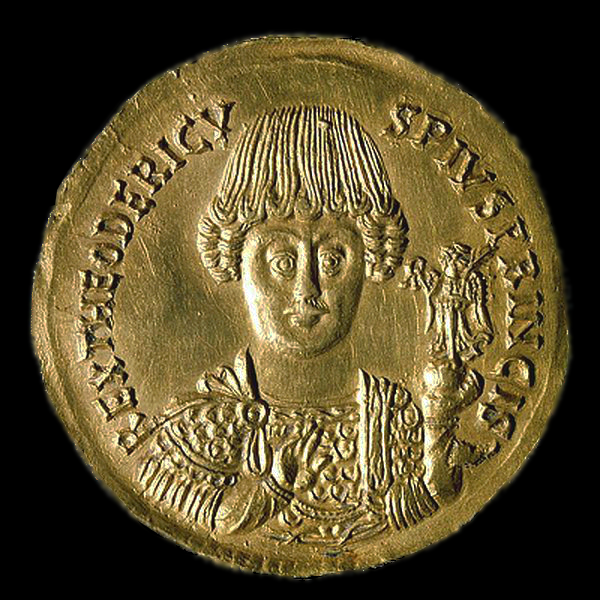
Bust of Pyrrhus, king of Epirus 306–302 BC and 297–272 BC (left) and medallion of Theodoric the Great, king of the Ostrogoths and Italy 493–526 AD (right). Tocci genealogies proclaimed the family to descend from both of these figures.

The Tocchi originated in Benevento in the Kingdom of Sicily. Some historical genealogies from the Renaissance derived their surname from the Tauci, a Gothic tribe attested in the time of the Ostrogothic king Totila (r. 541–552). This connection was made through observing the similarity of the names Tocci (the Latin form of Tocchi), Tauci and Totila. Some early modern genealogies went as far as claim descent from one of Totila's predecessors, the greatest of the Ostrogothic kings, Theodoric the Great (r. 475/493–526). In the early modern age, Tocco genealogies typically stressed the family's connection with Greek royalty rather than Germanic warlords. The family's legitimate relations to the Palaiologos and Komnenos dynasties of the Byzantine Empire, formed while the family ruled in Epirus in the 15th century, were emphasized and some ancient connections, such as supposed descent from Pyrrhus, ancient king of Epirus (r. 306–302 BC, 297–272 BC), were invented.

The connections to ancient Greek royalty were likely forged in the 17th century to further the claims to authority by the family's Greek branch, whereas the connections to Germanic kings might have been forged either during the family's early history (when Italy was under the control of the German Hohenstaufen dynasty) or during the service of many members of the family to the Habsburg emperors in the 16th century. Both connections may also simply have been made, as many genealogical connections to Antiquity were in the Renaissance, to link the noble family to the heroes of the ancient world.

The earliest known historical member of the Tocco family is Ugolino Tocco, who served as the Grand Seneschal of Henry VI, Holy Roman Emperor (r. 1191–1197). Ugolino is typically considered to be the family's founder. Instead of descending from heroic figures of bygone times, the Tocchi likely rose to prominence by being rewarded with lands and nobility on account of their service and loyalty in the 11th or 12th century. Their supposed ancestral seat, the Castellum di Tocco, in ruins in the present day, was located on the slopes of Monte Taburno in the Taburno Camposauro massif in southern Italy. The family grew in power and influence throughout the 12th and 13th centuries, recorded as having controlled lands throughout the valley surrounding Benevento from their seat at Castellum di Tocco. Tocchi of this time were buried in privileged positions within the Church of St. Lupo near Benevento, suggesting increasing social standing. Notable Tocchi recorded from the period of Hohenstaufen rule over southern Italy include Guillelmo di Tocco, who served as iudex (judge) in the local Hohenstaufen administration, and Landulfo di Tocco, who is recorded as having been granted the towns of Limata and Cerreto in May 1250 due to the loyalty he demonstrated to the Hohenstaufen rulers. The family fragmented in the early 13th century, divided into smaller branches of close relatives that did not necessarily share any coherent ancestral memory. Some of these branches of Tocchi are recorded outside of Benevento, serving as traders or medical practitioners at various locations in southern Italy.

=== Under the Angevin kings ===
The Hohenstaufen dynasty's rule over southern Italy was ended with their defeat by the Guelphs and the installation of Charles I of Anjou as the King of Sicily in 1266. As they had been integrated in the Hohenstaufen administration, the Tocchi suffered some setbacks during the initial period of Angevin rule. For instance, the Castellum di Tocco is in the 1280s recorded as having been subjected to the authority of Robert of Lavena, a French knight from Charles I's entourage. Not all Tocchi appear to have been affected by these setbacks, and the family produced prominent members during this period as well. Johannes de Tocco, doctor of medical science, served Charles I and his heir Charles II (r. 1285–1309) as their personal physician. A Dominican prior by the name Guillelmus de Tocco is recorded as a close confident of Charles II (serving as his confessor) and served as inquisitor-general of Sicily.

Previously only attended by Angevin and French elites, Charles II opened the court in Naples to the local nobility around 1300, allowing local nobles to hold various positions in the court itself and serve the king and his close relatives through military service. Alongside other nobles, some Tocchi are recorded as having entered Charles II's court at this time. Through serving as milites (knighted soldiers), nobles were allowed to live in the prestigious Neapolitan quarter of the Porta Capuana gate. Nobles who lived there in the early 14th century claimed their own special noble rank and direct descent from the ancient Roman residents of the city. To the Tocchi, living in this quarter of the city allowed them, despite having become a noble family relatively recently, to take on the mantle of "olden" aristocracy, increasing their prestige.

Among the Tocchi living in the Capuana quarter was Guglielmo Tocco, whom modern historians consider the founder of the branch of the family that would later rule territories in Greece. Guglielmo was well connected to the Neapolitan royal family, especially to Philip of Anjou, Charles II's younger son. Philip of Anjou was the Prince of Taranto from 1294 to 1331 and also held several titles in Greece, ruling as Prince of Achaea in 1307–1313 and also being the titular Latin Emperor of Constantinople from 1313–1331. Guglielmo served as one of Philip's knights and councillors and was awarded with lands in Italy for his loyalty several times. Though some later genealogists alleged that Guglielmo became connected to the royal dynasty through marrying one of Philip's illegitimate daughters, there is no contemporary evidence to support this. Similar assertions that his wife came from the Orsini family, perhaps that she was a daughter of John II Orsini, Despot of Epirus in 1323–1335, are also not substantiated from contemporary sources.

The Angevins ruled several possessions in Greece at the time, holdovers from the Fourth Crusade, out of which one of the most important was the island of Corfu. In 1327, Guglielmo Tocco served on the island as an inquisitor, investigating a juridical case. In 1330–1331, he was governor, or Captain-General, of Corfu, assigned to supervise the expenses, production income and customs of the island.

=== Tocchi in Greece ===
==== Rulers in the Ionian Islands ====
Arms of the Tocchi as Counts palatine of Cephalonia and Zakynthos: the Tocco arms with Anjou-Taranto in canton

Guglielmo had several children, but his most prominent son was Leonardo I Tocco. Though he was one of Guglielmo's younger sons, Leonardo stood higher than all his brothers by the end of his life. Around 1357, Leonardo I was granted the title of Count Palatine of Cephalonia and Zakynthos, two islands off the western coast of Greece, by either Robert of Taranto (Philip of Anjou's son and heir) or Queen Joanna I of Naples. Sources on Leonardo I are scarce and how exactly he came to gain his high position in Greece is unclear. It is possible that he was brought into touch with Robert of Taranto by his older brother, Pietro Tocco, and he is known to have been one of his close confidants, being recorded as a witness of Robert's marriage contract and is recorded as having labored intensely to free Robert when he at one point was imprisoned in the Kingdom of Hungary. One factor that might have contributed to Leonardo I's rise to power was his marriage to Maddalena de' Buondelmonti, the niece of Niccolò Acciaioli, Grand Seneschal of the Kingdom of Naples.

In 1362, Leonardo I seized the nearby island Lefkada and the fortress of Vonitsa, located on the mainland. He assumed the additional titles "Lord of Vonitsa" and Dux Leucade ("Duke of Lefkada"). The taking of Lefkada and Vonitsa were not outright conquests; the locals had grown dissatisfied by their ruling family, the Venetian Zorzi, and had summoned Leonardo I to their aid. Although contemporary chroniclers wrote that Leonardo promised to respect the local Orthodox religion, he is also recorded to have driven the local Orthodox archbishop from Vonitsa. Upon Leonardo I's death in the 1370s, his domain was inherited by his infant son, Carlo I Tocco, with the administration of his early reign handled by his mother Maddalena as regent. By the late 1380s, Carlo I was, according to the historian William Miller, the most powerful remaining Latin ruler in the eastern Mediterranean. Around 1390, Carlo reached maturity and his mother's regency ended. He married Francesca Acciaioli, daughter of Nerio I Acciaioli, Duke of Athens (r. 1285/1394–1394). Carlo I's most trusted advisor and military leader was his younger brother, Leonardo II Tocco, who as a reward for his services was granted the island of Zakynthos in 1399. The island was not given away as a usual feudal possession, since it was specified that regardless of Leonardo II fathering any children, the island would be returned to Carlo I at the time of his death.

In 1394, Carlo I came into conflict with Theodore I Palaiologos, son of Emperor John V Palaiologos and Despot of the Morea (r. 1383–1407). Nerio I of Athens died in September 1394 and designated Carlo I's wife Francesca as the heir to all his possessions and as the guardian of the town of Corinth. The will almost completely disregarded Francesca's older sister, Bartolomea Acciaioli, wife of Theodore I Palaiologos. As a result, Theodore attacked Corinth almost immediately after Nerio's death, claiming the right by primogeniture rather than following the will. Francesca held power in the town as she had been present there at the time of Nerio's death, and actively participated in its defense, leading the local troops herself. Though popular with the soldiers, Francesca's role was marginalized once Carlo arrived in the town late in 1394 or early 1395 and she soon thereafter left for Cephalonia. The conflict was resolved with Carlo agreeing to sell the town, and Francesca's other possessions, to Theodore for 6000 golden ducats and an annual rent of 600 golden ducats.

Map of the conquests of Carlo I Tocco

The early 15th century saw Carlo I working to expand his domain—mainly successfully—into the lands of Epirus and drive out the local Albanians, who had ruled various principalities there since the collapse of the Serbian Empire, which had destroyed the original Despotate of Epirus in the 1340s. The motive for these conquests is not clear. Perhaps Carlo I worked to save the locals from perceived "Albanian tyranny" or perhaps he was retaliating; the Albanian lord John Spata had reportedly attacked the Tocco island domain during his mother's regency. In 1411, the ruler of the town of Ioannina (and Carlo I's uncle), Esau de' Buondelmonti, Despot of Epirus, died. The town was then held by his wife, Jevdokija Balšić, but on account of her unpopularity she was deposed by the locals, who appealed to Carlo I to become their ruler instead. Only two months after Esau's death, Carlo I made a triumphal entry into Ioannina. He almost immediately assumed the title of Despot, though the locals insisted that Carlo seek recognition of that title from the Byzantine emperor. After having received Carlo I's brother Leonardo II as an emissary, Emperor Manuel II Palaiologos (r. 1391–1425) formally recognized Carlo I as a Despot in 1415. Miller referred to the Tocco dynasty under Carlo I and Leonardo II as "among the most ambitious and able Latin dynasties in the Levant".

In the Ionian islands, the Tocco secured their power by grants of nobility and feudal landholdings to both Italian and local Greek families. Most positions in the Tocco power structure were occupied by loyal figures of Neapolitan or southern Italian origin, which established some level of disconnect between the Greek-speaking population and their Latin rulers. However, there was some involvement of Greeks in the Tocco court, though they mostly occupied the lower levels of the administrative hierarchy.

==== Despots of Epirus ====
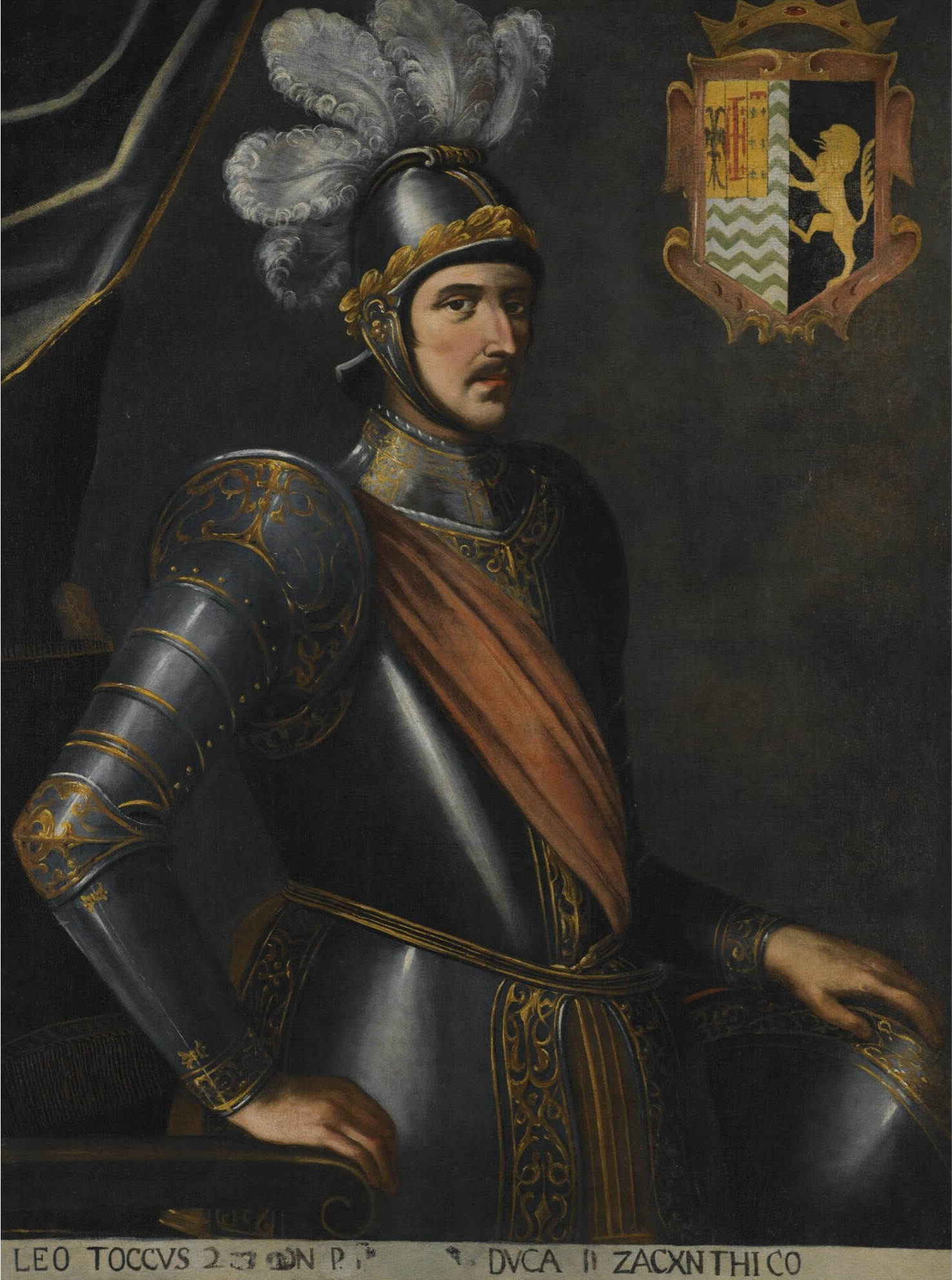
Early 17th-century portrait of "Leonardo Tocco, Duke of Zakynthos". It is unclear which Leonardo (III, IV or V) is depicted.

Carlo I saw his title of Despot as granting him a claim on the lands formerly ruled by the Komnenos Doukas and Orsini dynasties of the Despotate of Epirus. He thus moved to seize Arta, the ancient capital of the despotate. After taking it from the local Albanians, Carlo I ceremonially entered the city in October 1416. According to his own chroniclers, the locals perceived Carlo I's conquest of Arta to be a great victory. Carlo I had successfully united the Greeks of Epirus under a single realm once more, something that his chroniclers wrote "could not have been done in the last two hundred years".

Around the end of 1426, conflict began again between Carlo I and the Byzantine Despotate of the Morea, when Carlo I attacked a contingent of Albanian soldiers in the Peloponnese that fought for Despot Theodore II Palaiologos (r. 1407–1443). Carlo I also occupied territories in the northwestern parts of Theodore II's domain. In 1427, Emperor John VIII Palaiologos (r. 1425–1448) personally set out to deal with Carlo I, bringing his younger brother Constantine with him. On 26 December 1427, the two brothers reached Mystras, the capital of the Morea, and made their way to the town of Glarentza, which was captured by the Tocchi forces. In the Battle of the Echinades, a naval skirmish off the coast of Glarentza, Carlo I was defeated and he agreed to relinquish his conquests in the Morea. In order to seal the peace, Tocco offered his niece, Creusa Tocco (whose name was later changed to the Greek Theodora), in marriage to Constantine, her dowry being Glarentza and the other Moreot territories held by Carlo I. Glarentza was given to the Byzantines on 1 May 1428 and on 1 July, Constantine married Theodora. As such, Carlo I's defeat was not nearly as catastrophic as it could have been; though he was defeated militarily, he also gained a close connection to the Byzantine imperial family.

Carlo I probably died in June 1429, and his domains were plunged into chaos. Less than a year after his death, the important town of Ioannina had already been captured by the Ottoman Empire, and his legitimate heir, his nephew Carlo II Tocco, was engaged with Carlo I's illegitimate sons in a war of inheritance. Though successful against his cousins in retaining power, by the time of his death around 1448 Carlo II had lost nearly all of his possessions on the mainland to the Ottoman Empire. Although Carlo II was, according to historian Nada Zečević, often blamed in past scholarship for the loss of these territories, being perceived as a "weak ruler", the fall of the Tocco territories was an outcome of a much broader Ottoman advance across the Balkans in the 15th century. Even Carlo II's stronger neighbors, notably the Byzantine Empire, were powerless to stop the rise of the Ottomans. Carlo II was succeeded by his son, Leonardo III Tocco, who inherited the despotate as a minor. In March 1449, the Ottomans captured Arta. Though several contemporary sources describe Leonardo III as an exceptional ruler and his domain as prosperous and stable, his tenure as Despot of Epirus and Count Palatine of Cephalonia and Zakynthos ended in catastrophe, with the Ottomans seizing his final possessions in Greece in 1479 and his family being forced into exile, returning to Naples, where they still had living relatives, descendants of other sons of Guglielmo Tocco.

Ottoman conquest was a fate that none of the contemporary minor rulers in the Balkans could escape. The Ottoman campaign against Leonardo III had completed the Turkish conquest of mainland Greece; Leonardo had been one of the last independent Latin rulers in the region. There is no universally accepted historical assessment of the Tocco family's rule and ambitions in Greece. According to Zečević, the two largest schools of thought view the Tocchi as either minor nobles who simply obtained the legitimate administrative positions in service of the Angevin kings in Greece, or as adventurers in search for power and fortune in the ruins of the once powerful Byzantine Empire.

=== Exiles in Italy ===
Leonardo III spent the rest of his life in Naples trying to come up with ways to retake his territories in Greece. He did not take his early years in exile well, perceiving his exile as unjust, and lamenting his decline in status. In 1480, while he was attempting to secure support from powerful feudal lords in southern Italy to aid him in retaking his Greek domains, Leonardo III reportedly said, in regards to his family, that "we may have lost our rings but we still did not lose our fingers", a sentence Zečević writes "would long afterwards be quoted as the key illustration of the family's pragmatism".

Some members of the family adopted to life in Italy quite well. Leonardo III's brother, Giovanni Tocco, became protonotary apostolic in Rome and Leonardo III's oldest son and heir, Carlo III Tocco, served the Sforza family of Milan, and later Holy Roman Emperor Maximilian I (r. 1508–1519), in a military capacity. Leonardo III's second son, Fernando Tocco, was a diplomat at the court of Henry VII of England (r. 1485–1509). Leonardo III's younger brother, Antonio, briefly succeeded in retaking Cephalonia in 1481. He was however not liked by the Republic of Venice, nor by the local populace, and was murdered in 1483, either by the Venetians or by the locals.

The discontent the Tocchi felt with their exile was eased as new generations of the family were born and educated in Italy, more adopted and familiar with life there. The Tocchi of the 16th century oriented themselves to trade, mercenary service and diplomacy, often finding themselves working far from Naples. The exiled Tocchi, though more and more acquainted with life in Italy, also began to emphasize their Greek identity, stressing their familial and titular connections to the Byzantine emperors. According to Zečević, this was probably not some sign of "late Greek self-consciousness", but rather a useful decision made to "improve their new realities as dignitaries with an imperial lineage".

=== Italian nobility ===
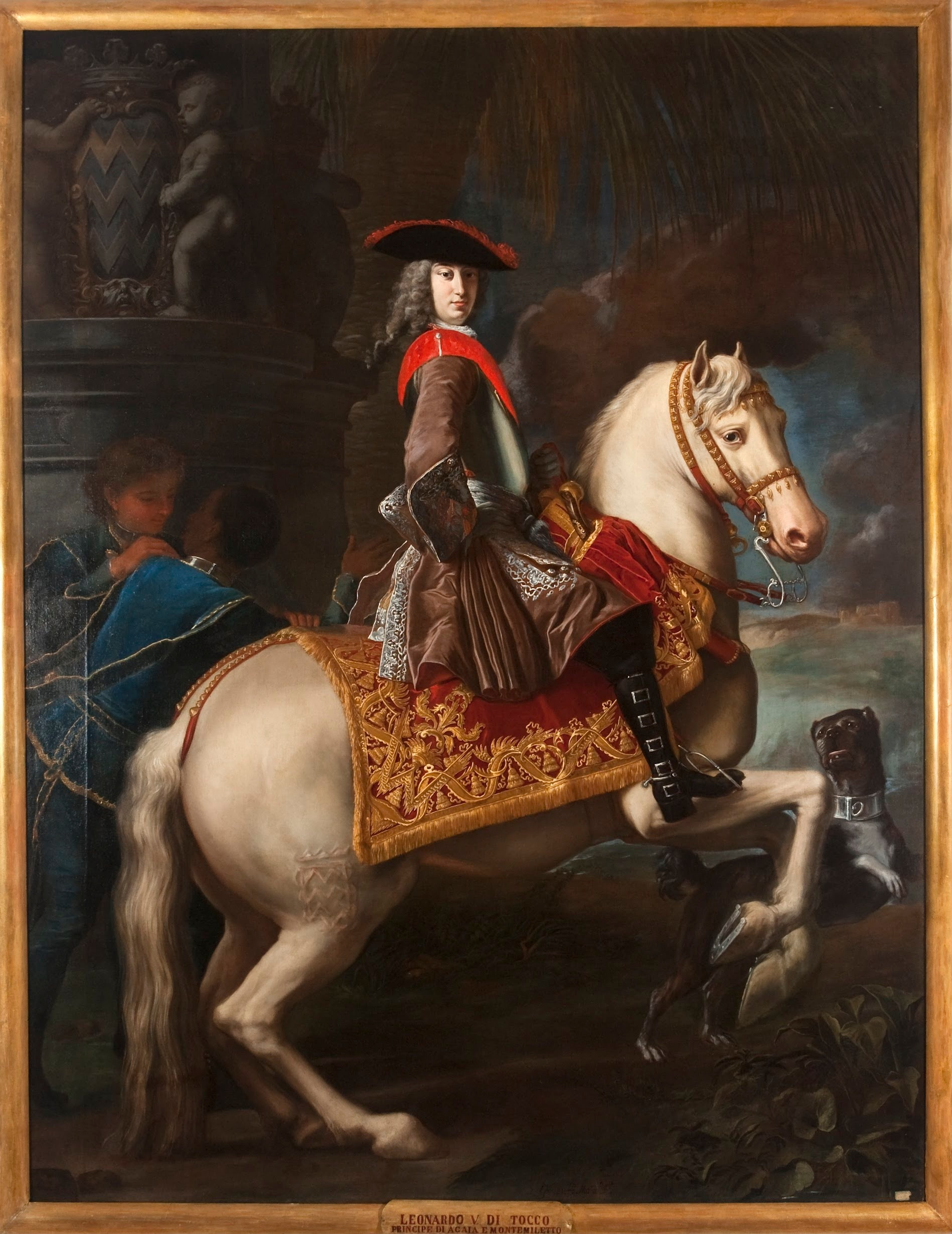
1725 painting of Leonardo VII Tocco (1698–1776), Prince of Montemiletto and Achaea, Count of Monteaperti and Lord of Refrancore, on horseback (the label erroneously numbers him Leonardo V)

The Tocchi were almost alone among the families of the Latin rulers of Greece to leave descendants lasting until modern times. Carlo III Tocco and his descendants claimed to be "princes of the blood", as they represented the heirs of both the Serbian and Byzantine imperial dynasties. Leonardo III's wife, and Carlo III's mother, was Milica Branković, daughter of the Serb ruler Lazar Branković and Helena Palaiologina, a daughter of Thomas Palaiologos, Despot of the Morea (r. 1428–1460). Following the extinction of the last certain male-line descendants of Thomas Palaiologos in the 16th century, the Tocchi represented the most senior line of his heirs. They continued to claim the title of Despot of Epirus until 1642, when Antonio Tocco abandoned it and replaced it with the title of Prince of Achaea, which his descendants continued to use. The claim to the latter title probably derived from Thomas Palaiologos. Thomas had married the heiress of Centurione II Zaccaria, the last Prince of Achaea (r. 1404–1432), and had inherited the territories of the principality upon Centurione's death in 1432.

During the centuries that followed their return to Italy, the nobility of the Tocchi was reinforced, mostly through a number of royal donations. Carlo III Tocco married Andronica Arianiti Comneno, a daughter of Constantine Komnenos Arianites, another claimant to various lands in Greece. It was with their son, Leonardo IV Tocco, that the Tocchi again became landed nobles as he was granted the fortress Refrancore in Piedmont by Constantine, ruling it with the title Lord (signore). Leonardo IV's grandson, Leonardo V Tocco, added to the family lands by purchasing the barony of Apice in 1639. Leonardo V's son, Antonio, who abandoned the despotal title, also increased the number of territories held by the family significantly. In 1665 he purchased the barony of Calabritto and in 1674, Antonio inherited the titles Prince of Montemiletto, Count of Monteaperti and Baron of Grumo, Montefalcione, Serra and Manocalzati from his father-in-law. From Antonio's time and onwards, the Tocchi mainly identified themselves through their ownership of Montemiletto.

Antonio's grandson, Carlo Antonio Tocco, purchased the baronies of Nocelle and Fontanarosa, but sold the Barony of Calabritto. Carlo Antonio's son, Leonardo VII Tocco, was made Duke of Apice in 1720, and would serve the Papal States and the Holy Roman Empire in high positions. In 1724 he is attested as captain of the cavalry of the pontifical guard in Rome and in 1725, he is recorded as Imperial Counsellor of State under Emperor Charles VI (r. 1711–1740). Among various other honors garnered in his lifetime, Leonardo VII was made a knight of the Order of Saint Januarius in 1738. Leonardo married Camilla Cantelmo Stuart, of the prominent Italian Cantelmo Stuart family, which claimed descent from, and kinship with, the Scottish and English royal House of Stuart. Leonardo thereafter assumed the full last name "Tocco Cantelmo Stuart" also used by their descendants, exemplified through the name of their son and Leonardo VII's heir, Restaino di Tocco Cantelmo Stuart, who inherited the titles of Camilla's family, gaining the title of Duke of Popoli. Restaino's son and heir, Carlo II di Tocco Cantelmo Stuart, gained the title Baron of Roccavallescura and of Pratola.

The Tocco family went extinct with the death of Carlo's grandson of the same name on 24 March 1884. This Carlo di Tocco Cantelmo Stuart, and his father Francesco before him, had been the leader of a faction of Bourbon legitimists who wished to restore the Kingdom of the Two Sicilies after the formation of the Kingdom of Italy in 1861. Their titles were inherited by Carlo Capece Galeota, a descendant of Carlo II di Tocco Cantelmo Stuart. Capece Galeota died in 1908, and his heir and last living descendant, his daughter Maria Maddalena, died in 1933. Though the Tocco family survived long enough for the lands they claimed in Greece to be liberated from Ottoman control in the 19th century and incorporated into the Kingdom of Greece, it was never suggested that the Tocchi resume their ruling positions in their former lands.

== List of heads of the Tocco family (1357–1884) ==
Significant figures in the succession that were not heads of the family, such as Leonardo II Tocco, are indicated with beige background color.

Portrait	Name	Lifespan	Titles (Note: Not necessarily accounting for all the titles held by the individual nobles, but the ones primarily in use, per Shamà (2013))	Relations	Ref
	Leonardo I Tocco	Unknown – between 20 March 1375 and 25 August 1377	Count Palatine of Cephalonia and Zakynthos, Duke of Leucadia, Lord of Vonitsa	Son of Guglielmo Tocco	
	Carlo I Tocco	Between 28 May 1374 and 25 August 1377 – 4 July 1429	Despot of Epirus, Count Palatine of Cephalonia and Zakynthos, Duke of Leucadia	Son of Leonardo I Tocco	
	Leonardo II Tocco	Between 28 May 1374 and 25 August 1377 – 1418	Count Palatine of Zakynthos	Son of Leonardo I Tocco	
	Carlo II Tocco	Unknown – 30 September 1448	Despot of Epirus, Count Palatine of Cephalonia and Zakynthos, Duke of Leucadia	Son of Leonardo II Tocco	
	Leonardo III Tocco	After 1436 – c. 1503	Despot of Epirus, Count Palatine of Cephalonia and Zakynthos, Duke of Leucadia, Lord of Angelokastro, Vonitsa and Varnazza	Son of Carlo II Tocco	
	Carlo III Tocco	1464 – 1518	Titular Despot of Epirus and Count Palatine of Cephalonia and Zakynthos	Son of Leonardo III Tocco	
	Leonardo IV Tocco	c. 1510 – 1564	Titular Despot of Epirus and Count Palatine of Cephalonia and Zakynthos, Lord of Refrancore	Son of Carlo III Tocco	
	Francesco Tocco	Unknown – 16 August 1596	Titular Despot of Epirus and Count Palatine of Cephalonia and Zakynthos, Lord of Refrancore	Son of Leonardo IV Tocco	
	Leonardo V Tocco	1591 – 24 January 1641	Titular Despot of Epirus and Count Palatine of Cephalonia and Zakynthos, Baron of Apice and Tinchiano	Son of Francesco Tocco	
	Antonio Tocco	16 August 1618 – 5 March 1678	Titular Despot of Epirus and Count Palatine of Cephalonia and Zakynthos (until 1642), Prince of Montemiletto, Titular Prince of Achaea (from 1642), Count of Monteaperti, Baron of Apice, Tinchiano, Grumo, Montefalcione, Serra, Manocalzati and Calabritto	Son of Leonardo V Tocco	
	Leonardo VI Tocco	Unknown – 26 September 1670	–	Son of Antonio Tocco	
	Carlo Antonio Tocco	15 March 1668 – 31 January 1701	Prince of Montemiletto, Titular Prince of Achaea, Count of Monteaperti, Baron of Grumo, Montefalcione, Serra, Manocalzati, Nocelle, Fontanarosa and Calabritto, Lord of Refrancore	Son of Leonardo VI Tocco	
	Leonardo VII Tocco	1 January 1698 – 31 March 1776	Prince of Montemiletto, Titular Prince of Achaea, Duke of Apice, Count of Monteaperti, Baron of Grumo, Nocelle, Fontanarosa, Manocalzati and Serra, Lord of Refrancore	Son of Carlo Antonio Tocco	
	Restaino di Tocco Cantelmo Stuart	6 August 1730 – 21 February 1796	Prince of Montemiletto, Titular Prince of Achaea, Duke of Apice (with Tinchiano, Tipogaldo and Tigliola), Duke of Popoli, Count of Monteaperti, Baron of Montefalcione, Serra, Manocalzati, Fantanarosa and Grumo, Lord of Refrancore, Grandee of Spain	Son of Leonardo VII Tocco	
	Carlo II di Tocco Cantelmo Stuart	7 March 1756 – 19 July 1823	Prince of Montemiletto, Titular Prince of Achaea, Duke of Apice, Duke of Popoli, Count of Monteaperti, Baron of Fontanarosa, Montefalcione, Grumo, Roccavallescura, Serra and Pratola, Grandee of Spain	Son of Restaino di Tocco Cantelmo Stuart	
	Francesco di Tocco Cantelmo Stuart	18 November 1790 – 16 April 1877	Prince of Montemiletto, Titular Prince of Achaea, Duke of Apice, Duke of Popoli, Count of Monteaperti, Grandee of Spain	Son of Carlo II di Tocco Cantelmo Stuart	
	Carlo III di Tocco Cantelmo Stuart	4 April 1827 – 24 March 1884	Prince of Montemiletto, Titular Prince of Achaea, Duke of Apice, Duke of Popoli, Count of Monteaperti, Grandee of Spain	Son of Francesco di Tocco Cantelmo Stuart	

== See also ==
- Chronicle of the Tocco
