= Carlo III di Tocco Cantelmo Stuart =

Prince of Montemiletto

- Prince of Montemiletto (Note: Carlo's full titles among the Italian nobility were Prince of Montemiletto, Prince of Achaea, Duke of Apice, Duke of Popoli, Count of Monteaperti.)
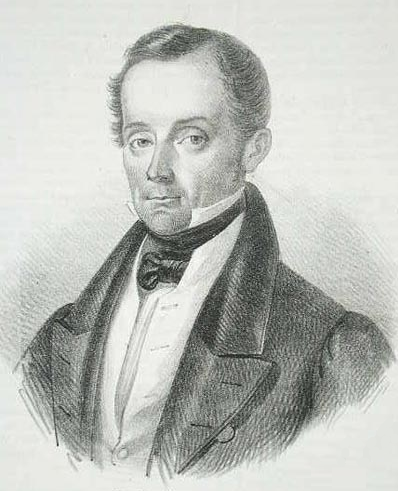
- Portrait of Carlo III di Tocco Cantelmo Stuart by an unknown artist

Prince of Achaea (Neapolitan nobility)
- Reign: 16 April 1877 – 24 March 1884
- Predecessor: Francesco di Tocco Cantelmo Stuart
- Successor: Carlo Capece Galeota
- Born: 4 April 1827; Naples
- Died: 24 March 1884 (Note: The date of death 25 August 1888 is used in some sources. The 1888 date is wrong and derives from a mistake in a 1984 genealogical work by Detlev Schwennicke.) (aged 56); Naples
- Dynasty: Tocco
- Father: Francesco di Tocco Cantelmo Stuart
- Mother: Maria Maddalena di Tocco Cantelmo Stuart

Don Carlo III di Tocco Cantelmo Stuart (Note: By the time Carlo III di Tocco Cantelmo Stuart became the head of the Tocco family there had been four previous heads of the Tocco family with the name Carlo: Carlo I Tocco, Carlo II Tocco, Carlo III Tocco and Carlo II di Tocco Cantelmo Stuart. Through this it follows that he could accurately be considered Carlo V Tocco. Rather than being enumerated as Carlo V, the later Tocchi enumerated themselves as princes of Montemiletto, Carlo III being the third Carlo of the Tocco family to be prince of Montemiletto, after his grandfather Carlo II di Tocco Cantelmo Stuart and his matrilineal ancestor Carlo de Tocco.) (4 April 1827 – 24 March 1884), or Carlo di Tocco for short, was a 19th-century Italian noble, serving as the Prince of Montemiletto and the titular Prince of Achaea from the death of his father Francesco di Tocco Cantelmo Stuart in 1877 to his own death in 1884. Carlo III di Tocco Cantelmo Stuart was the last living member of the Tocco family, which had once ruled the Despotate of Epirus. Carlo was prominent among the nobility of Italy, having held high honors in the Kingdom of the Two Sicilies until its fall in 1861 and thereafter becoming a leader figure among those who sought to restore it.

== Biography ==
Carlo III di Tocco Cantelmo Stuart was born in Naples on 4 April 1827, as the eldest son of Francesco di Tocco Cantelmo Stuart, Prince of Montemiletto and titular Prince of Achaea, and Maria Maddalena di Tocco Cantelmo Stuart. Francesco and Maria Maddalena were cousins. Upon his Francesco's death on 16 April 1877, Carlo inherited father's titles, including not only Montemiletto but also various other fiefs throughout Italy, and claims.

While the Kingdom of the Two Sicilies still existed, before its fall in 1861 and the transition of the Kingdom of Sardinia, which had conquered the Two Sicilies, into the Kingdom of Italy, Carlo was a high-ranking member of the nobility of the Two Sicilies. He had for instance in his youth been made a gentleman of the chamber by Ferdinand II of the Two Sicilies. Carlo also joined several orders of knighthood, becoming a Knight of Devotion within the Sovereign Military Order of Malta on 8 January 1873, and also joining the Sacred Military Constantinian Order of Saint George and the Order of St. Gregory the Great. After his father's death, Carlo rose to be considered a leader among the Bourbon legitimists who sought to restore the Kingdom of the Two Sicilies. Prior to his father's death, Carlo and his father had been implicated in the July 1861 failed conspiracy of Frisio, which had been aimed at provoking insurrection and occupying Naples in favor of the Bourbon dynasty. Both Carlo and Francesco were abroad at the time of the investigations, so the accusations against them amounted to nothing.

Carlo died unmarried and childless in Naples on 24 March 1884. With Carlo's death the Tocco family, which had originated eight or seven centuries prior and had once ruled the Despotate of Epirus, was rendered extinct. Carlo's titles were inherited by Carlo Capece Galeota, who was matrilineally descended from Carlo II di Tocco Cantelmo Stuart, Carlo III's grandfather.
