= Francesco Tocco =

- Lord of Refrancore

Despot of Epirus Count Palatine of Cephalonia and Zakynthos (titular)
- Reign: 1564–1596
- Predecessor: Leonardo IV Tocco
- Successor: Leonardo V Tocco
- Born: Unknown
- Died: 16 August 1596
- Spouse: Veronica Malaspina
- Issue: Leonardo V Tocco
- Dynasty: Tocco
- Father: Leonardo IV Tocco
- Mother: Maddalena (Graziosa) Colli

Francesco Tocco (died 16 August 1596) was the titular Despot of Epirus and Count Palatine of Cephalonia and Zakynthos from the death of his father Leonardo IV Tocco in 1564 to his own death in 1596. He served as infantry captain in the army of the Republic of Venice.

== Biography ==
Francesco Tocco was the second son of Leonardo IV Tocco and the Italian noblewoman Maddalena (Graziosa) Colli. His older brother Carlo predeceased Leonardo IV, which made Francesco the oldest surviving son and thus the heir to his father's claims.

Francesco was a patrician of Venice, and held the castle of Refrancore in Montferrat, granted to his father by Constantine Arianiti, another pretender to lands in Greece. As an adult, Francesco worked as a soldier, serving as an infantry captain in the army of the Republic of Venice.

Francesco died on 16 August 1596. At an unknown point in time, Francesco married Veronica Malaspina, a daughter of the Veronese nobleman Girolamo Malaspina. Veronica outlived Francesco by more than a decade, still attested as being alive as late as 1611. Francesco and Veronica had only a single child, the son Leonardo V Tocco, born in 1591, who inherited and continued Francesco's claims.

Francesco Tocco Tocco dynasty Died: 16 August 1596
Titles in pretence
| Preceded by Leonardo IV Tocco | — TITULAR — Despot of Epirus; 1564–1596 | Succeeded by Leonardo V Tocco |
| Preceded by Leonardo IV Tocco | — TITULAR — Count Palatine of Cephalonia and Zakynthos; 1564–1596 | Succeeded by Leonardo V Tocco |
