= Restaino di Tocco Cantelmo Stuart =

Prince of Montemiletto

- Prince of Montemiletto (Note: Restaino's full titles among the Italian nobility were Prince of Montemiletto, Duke of Apice (with Tinchiano, Tipogaldo and Tigliola), Duke of Popoli, Count of Monteaperti, Baron of Montefalcione, Serra, Manocalzati, Fantanarosa and Grumo, Lord of Refrancore.)
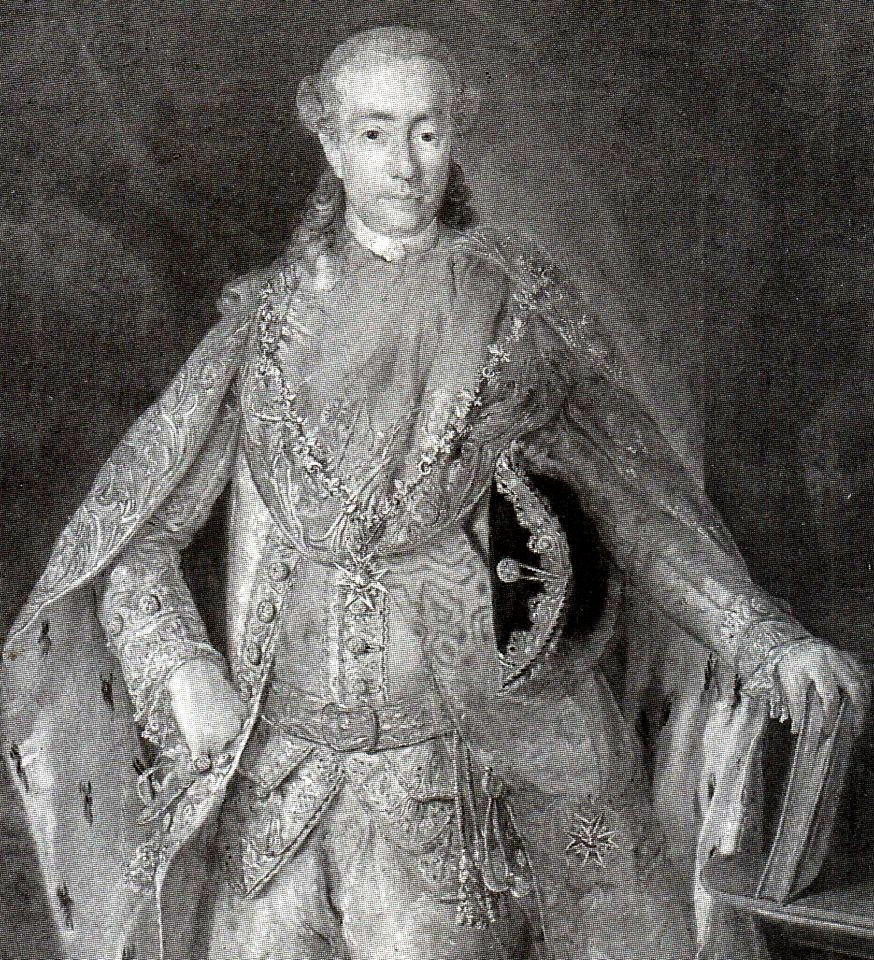
- Portrait of Restaino di Tocco Cantelmo Stuart by an unknown artist

Prince of Achaea (Neapolitan nobility)
- Reign: 10 April 1776 – 21 February 1796
- Predecessor: Leonardo VII Tocco
- Successor: Carlo II di Tocco Cantelmo Stuart
- Born: 6 August 1730; Montemiletto
- Died: 21 February 1796 (aged 65); Naples
- Spouse: Maria Camilla Cybo Malaspina; Maria Maddalena d’Aquino
- Issue: 15 children, see article
- Dynasty: Tocco
- Father: Leonardo VII Tocco
- Mother: Camilla Cantelmo Stuart

Don Restaino Gioacchino di Tocco Cantelmo Stuart (6 August 1730 – 21 February 1796), or Restaino di Tocco for short, was an 18th-century Italian noble, serving as the Prince of Montemiletto and the titular Prince of Achaea, among other titles, from the death of his father Leonardo VII Tocco in 1776 to his own death in 1796.

== Biography ==
Restaino Gioacchino di Tocco Cantelmo Stuart was born at Montemiletto on 6 August 1730, as the second son of Leonardo VII Tocco, Prince of Montemiletto and titular Prince of Achaea, and the Italian noblewoman Camilla Cantelmo Stuart. Camilla's family, the Cantelmo Stuarts, claimed descent from, and kinship with, the Scottish and English royal House of Stuart. Restaino was named after his maternal grandfather, Restaino Cantelmo Stuart.

Upon Leonardo VII's death on 31 March 1776, Restaino inherited his father's titles and claims, as his older brother Carlo had predeceased Leonardo, dying childless in 1747. Restaino had been ordained as a priest on 26 April 1744, but he resigned in 1776 in order to be able to succeed his father, being confirmed as the heir through a court decision on 10 April 1776. In addition to inheriting Montemiletto and various other fiefs held by his family throughout Italy, Restaino also inherited his father's status as a Grandee of Spain and a knight of the Order of Saint Januarius.

Restaino married twice. His first wife was Maria Camilla Cybo-Malaspina, the youngest daughter of the late Duke of Massa and Carrara, Alderano I. Restaino and Maria Camilla married in Massa on 31 January 1755, but she died just five years later, on 2 August 1760, aged just 32. Restaino's second wife was Maria Maddalena d’Aquino, daughter of Antonio d’Aquino, Prince of Caramanico (among other titles), whom he married in Naples on 23 April 1764.

Restaino died in Naples on 21 February 1796.

== Family ==
With his first wife, Maria Camilla Cybo Malaspina (1728–1760), Restaino di Tocco Cantelmo Stuart had four children:

- Carlo II di Tocco Cantelmo Stuart (7 March 1756 – 19 July 1823), son, heir to Restaino's titles.
- Alderano di Tocco Cantelmo Stuart (17–28 June 1757), son who died in infancy.
- Ricciardia di Tocco Cantelmo Stuart (2 October 1758 – 13 January 1761), daughter who died young.
- Maria Anna di Tocco Cantelmo Stuart (28 December 1759 – 2 July 1831), daughter.

With his second wife, Maria Maddalena d’Aquino (1748–1802), Restaino had eleven children:

- Maria Camilla di Tocco Cantelmo Stuart (26 February 1765 – 8 November 1840), daughter, Benedictine nun.
- Ippolita di Tocco Cantelmo Stuart (3 July 1766 – 6 April 1831), daughter.
- Maria Carmela di Tocco Cantelmo Stuart (5 September 1767 – 29 January 1825), daughter.
- Giovanni Battista di Tocco Cantelmo Stuart (11 October 1768 – 31 May 1793), son.
- Maria Teresa di Tocco Cantelmo Stuart (1769/1770 – 26 November 1771), daughter who died young.
- Maria Luisa di Tocco Cantelmo Stuart (19 April 1771 – 29 June 1837), daughter.
- Maria Giuseppa di Tocco Cantelmo Stuart (17 May 1772 – 1795), daughter.
- Nicola di Tocco Cantelmo Stuart (24 January 1775 – 14 February 1824), son.
- Leonardo di Tocco Cantelmo Stuart (1 May 1776 – 1 January 1826), son.
- Natalina di Tocco Cantelmo Stuart (25 December 1777 – 16 February 1824), daughter.
- Chiara di Tocco Cantelmo Stuart (26 June 1781 – 13 April 1844), daughter.
