= Francesco di Tocco Cantelmo Stuart =

Prince of Montemiletto

- Prince of Montemiletto (Note: Francesco's full titles among the Italian nobility were Prince of Montemiletto, Prince of Achaea, Duke of Apice, Duke of Popoli, Count of Monteaperti.)

Prince of Achaea (Neapolitan nobility)
- Reign: 19 July 1823 – 16 April 1877
- Predecessor: Carlo II di Tocco Cantelmo Stuart
- Successor: Carlo III di Tocco Cantelmo Stuart
- Born: 18 November 1790; Naples
- Died: 16 April 1877 (aged 86); Naples
- Spouse: Maria Maddalena di Tocco Cantelmo Stuart
- Issue: Carlo di Tocco; Nicola di Tocco; Giovanni Battista di Tocco; A stillborn son
- Dynasty: Tocco
- Father: Carlo II di Tocco Cantelmo Stuart
- Mother: Maria Antonia Carafa Cantelmo Stuart

Don Francesco di Paola Mariano Luigi di Tocco Cantelmo Stuart (18 November 1790 – 16 April 1877), or Francesco di Tocco for short, was an 18th/19th-century Italian noble, serving as the Prince of Montemiletto and the titular Prince of Achaea from the death of his father Carlo II di Tocco Cantelmo Stuart in 1823 to his own death in 1877. Francesco was high-ranking among the nobility of the Kingdom of the Two Sicilies, serving as a governmental and military official, and was a knight of three different orders of knighthood.

== Biography ==
Francesco di Paola Mariano Luigi di Tocco Cantelmo Stuart was born in Naples on 18 November 1789, as the youngest son of Carlo II di Tocco Cantelmo Stuart, Prince of Montemiletto and titular Prince of Achaea, and the Italian noblewoman Maria Antonia Carafa Cantelmo Stuart. Upon Carlo's death on 19 July 1823, Francesco inherited his father's titles, including not only Montemiletto but also various other fiefs throughout Italy, and claims. Francesco had two older brothers that were still alive at that point; Leonardo and Gennaro, though both had renounced their rights to the family inheritance. If any doubts still existed concerning Francesco's rights, his titles were confirmed by Ferdinand II of the Two Sicilies on 11 June 1845, though this was after both of his older brothers had died.

Francesco was a high-ranking noble in the Kingdom of the Two Sicilies until its fall in 1861. Among other honors, he was made a gentleman of the chamber by Ferdinand II and became a knight of the Royal Order of the Two-Sicilies, the Order of Saint Januarius and the Legion of Honour. He eventually rose within the Order of Saint Januariues to become the Deputy of the Treasury of the order. From 1826 to 1845, Francesco served as a member of the Commission of Nobility Titles in the Kingdom of the Two Sicilies from 1826 to 1845. Francesco also served the kingdom in a military capacity, being a colonel of the Reggimento Real Principe cavalleria ('Royal Prince Cavalry Regiment').

On 10 October 1821, Francesco married his cousin Maria Maddalena di Tocco Cantelmo Stuart at Naples.

After the Kingdom of the Two Sicilies fell to the Kingdom of Sardinia, which thereafter became the Kingdom of Italy, in 1861, Francesco and his son, Carlo III di Tocco Cantelmo Stuart, were implicated in the July 1861 failed conspiracy of Frisio. The conspiracy, supported by various nobles of the former Kingdom of the Two Sicilies, had sought to finance some of the kingdom's deposed ruling family, the House of Bourbon-Two Sicilies, and aimed to provoke armed insurrection and occupy the city of Naples. As both Francesco and Carlo were abroad at the time of the investigations, the accusations against them amounted to nothing.

Francesco died in Naples on 16 April 1877.

== Family ==
With his wife Maria Maddalena di Tocco Cantelmo Stuart, Francesco had four children:

- Carlo III di Tocco Cantelmo Stuart (4 April 1827 – 24 March 1884), son, heir to Francesco's titles.
- Nicola di Tocco Cantelmo Stuart (2 August 1828 – 5 November 1853), son.
- Giovanni Battista di Tocco Cantelmo Stuart (13 March 1831 – 22 May 1833), son who died young.
- A stillborn son, born 28 February 1844.
