= Leonardo VII Tocco =

Prince of Montemiletto

- Prince of Montemiletto (Note: Leonardo's full titles among the Italian nobility were Prince of Montemiletto, Duke of Apice, Count of Monteaperti, Baron of Grumo, Nocelle, Fontanarosa, Manocalzati and Serra, Lord of Refrancore.)
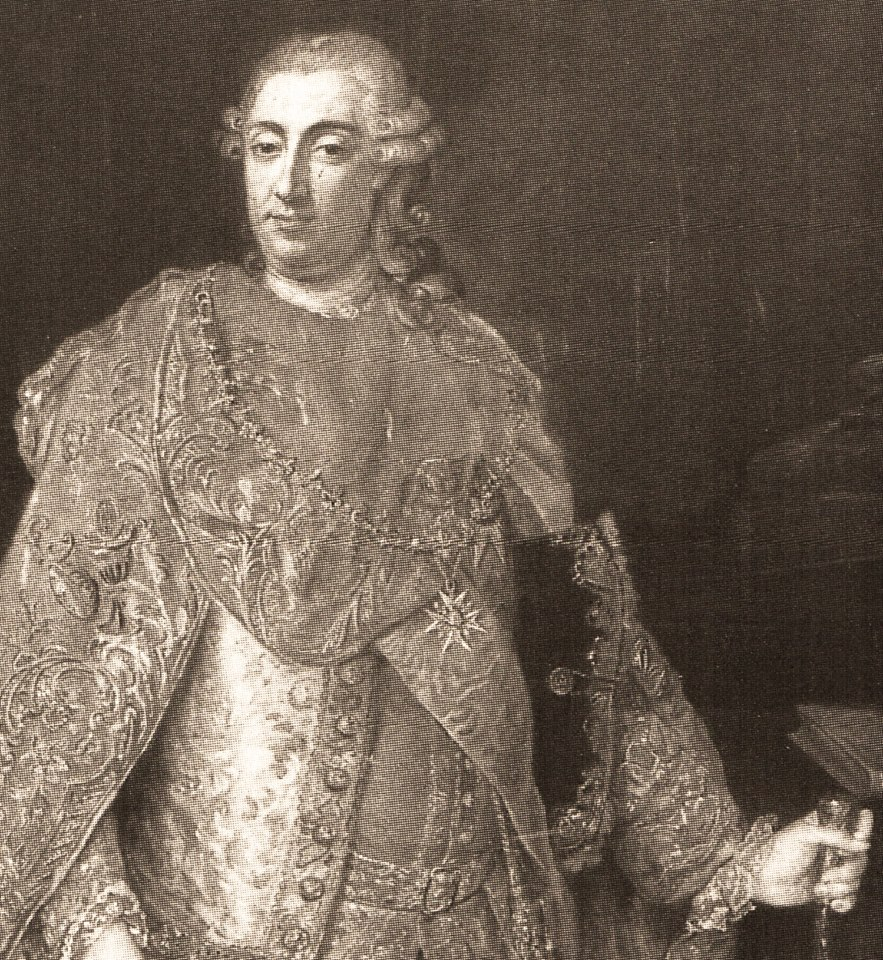
- Portrait of Leonardo VII Tocco by an unknown artist

Prince of Achaea (Neapolitan nobility)
- Reign: 31 January 1701 – 31 March 1776
- Predecessor: Carlo Antonio Tocco
- Successor: Restaino di Tocco Cantelmo Stuart
- Born: 1 January 1698; Montemiletto
- Died: 31 March 1776 (aged 78); Naples
- Spouse: Camilla Cantelmo Stuart
- Issue: Carlo Maria di Tocco; Maria Beatrice di Tocco; Restaino di Tocco
- Dynasty: Tocco
- Father: Carlo Antonio Tocco
- Mother: Livia Sanseverino

Don Leonardo VII Tocco (1 January 1698 – 31 March 1776), later also known under the full name Leonardo di Tocco Cantelmo Stuart, was an 18th-century Italian noble, serving as the Prince of Montemiletto and the titular Prince of Achaea from the death of his father Carlo Antonio Tocco in 1701 to his own death in 1776.

Throughout his life, Leonardo reached high honors and positions in service to the papacy, the Holy Roman Empire and the Kingdom of Naples. He served as the captain of the cavalrymen of the papal guard, an Imperial Counsellor of State in the Holy Roman Empire and a field marshal and vicar general in the Kingdom of Naples. In 1738, Leonardo became one of the first knights of the Order of Saint Januarius. He assumed the full last name 'di Tocco Cantelmo Stuart' after marrying Camilla Cantelmo Stuart, whose family claimed descent from the Scottish and English royal House of Stuart.

== Biography ==
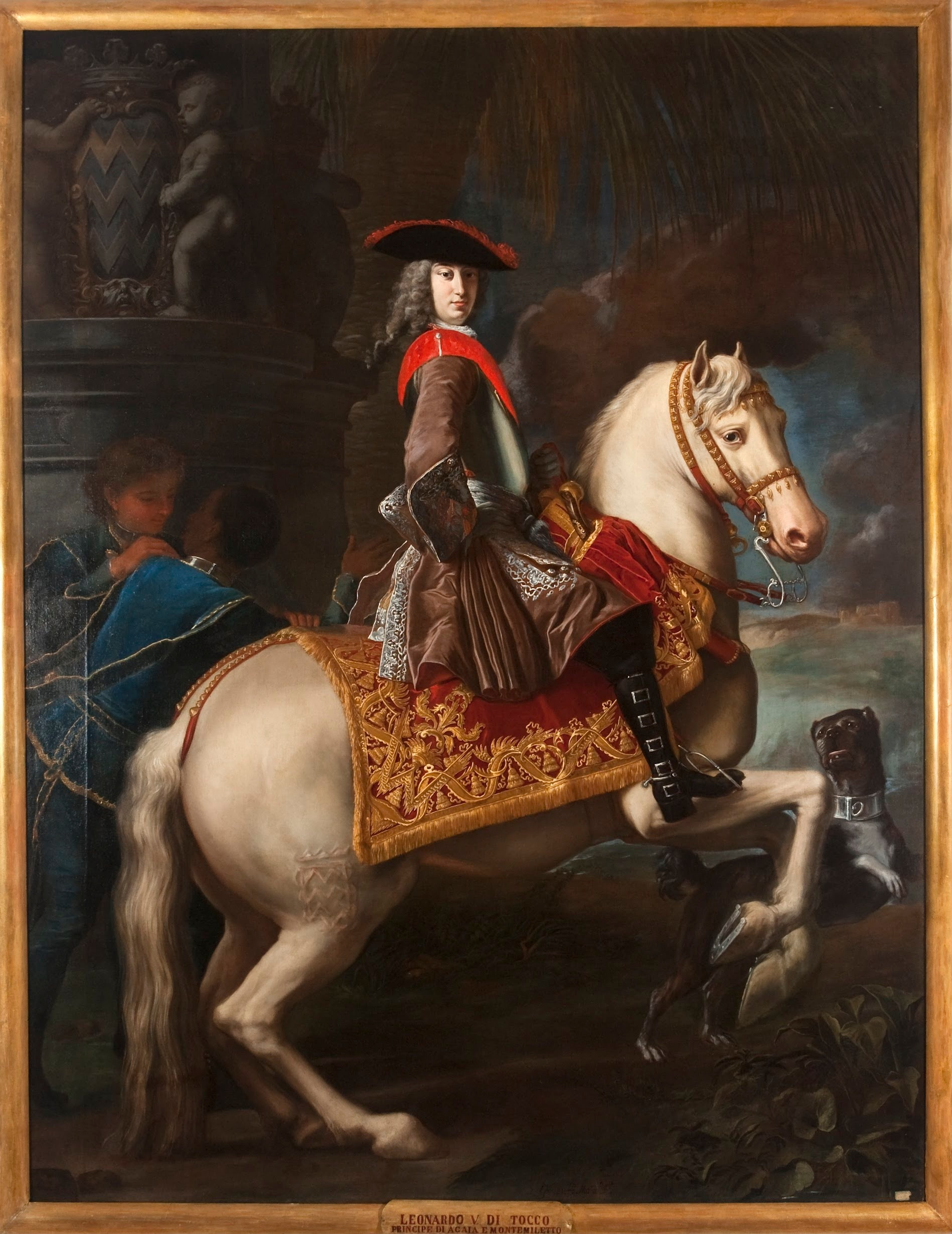
Painting of Leonardo VII Tocco on horseback (the label erroneously numbers him Leonardo V)

Leonardo VII Tocco was born at Montemiletto on 1 January 1698, the eldest son of Carlo Antonio Tocco, Prince of Montemiletto and titular Prince of Achaea, and the Italian noblewoman Livia Sanseverino. Upon his father's death on 31 January 1701, Leonardo inherited his titles.

Leonardo served the papacy and the Holy Roman Empire in high positions. On 20 October 1720, at the age of 22, Leonardo was made captain of a cavalry regiment of the papal guard. On 24 December 1724, just four years later, he was promoted to captain of all the cavalrymen. In the Holy Roman Empire, Emperor Charles VI (r. 1711–1740) made Leonardo the Imperial Counsellor of State on 6 October 1725.

Leonardo also achieved various honors in the Kingdom of Naples. On 23 April 1732, he was made field marshal and vicar general of the Principato Ultra, one of the kingdom's administrative divisions. On 14 July 1734, Charles VII of Naples made Leonardo a gentleman of the chamber. On 6 July 1738, Leonardo was made a knight of the Order of Saint Januarius, an order founded that year by Charles VII.

On 16 January 1724, Leonardo married Camilla Cantelmo Stuart (or Stuard), princess of Pettora and duchess of Popoli. Her family, the prominent Cantelmo Stuarts, claimed descent from, and kinship with, the Scottish and English royal House of Stuart. Following his marriage, Leonardo used the full name 'Leonardo di Tocco Cantelmo Stuart', also used by the couple's descendants.

Leonardo died in Naples on 31 March 1776.

== Family ==
With his wife Camilla Cantelmo Stuart, Leonardo VII Tocco had three children:

- Carlo Maria di Tocco Cantelmo Stuart (8 April 1725 – 1 April 1747), son.
- Maria Beatrice di Tocco Cantelmo Stuart (1 June 1726 – ?), daughter.
- Restaino di Tocco Cantelmo Stuart (6 August 1730 – 21 February 1796), son, heir to Leonardo's titles.
