= List of Epirote usurpers (Despotate of Epirus) =

The following is a list of usurpers in the Despotate of Epirus, from the start of the reign of Michael I in 1205 to its fall in 1479. This would include the domain of Thessaly they somewhat controlled.

== Successful Despots ==
The following is a listing of Despots/Consorts of Epirus who rose to the throne due to their own initiative through a revolts, assassinations, or coup d'état.

- Nicholas
- John
- Maria
- Carlo I

== Unsuccessful usurpers in the Despotate of Epirus ==
=== Michael II Komnenos Doukas (1230-71) ===
- John Komnenos Doukas (1240) - After his father Theodore placed him on the throne, John attempted to maintain sole control over Epirus and Thessalonica against his uncle Manuel, but he was forced to surrender power over Thessaly and relinquish his imperial title under Nicaean pressure in 1240.

=== Nikephoros I Komnenos Doukas (1271-97) ===
- Demetrios "Michael" Komnenos Doukas (c.1280) - During the reign of his brother Nikephoros I, Demetrios (who had married a daughter of Byzantine Emperor Michael VIII Palaiologos) allied with the pro-Byzantine imperial faction in Epirus. He conspired to overthrow Nikephoros I and his pro-Angevin wife, Anna Palaiologina Kantakouzene, aiming to place Epirus firmly under Constantinople's direct sphere of influence but failed.
- Anna Palaiologina Kantakouzene (1291-92) - Anna leaked intelligence to Constantinople and organized local pro-Byzantine aristocratic factions in Epirus to undermine Nikephoros's Western alliance, triggering the 1292 Byzantine invasion led by Michael Doukas Glabas Tarchaneiotes to reassert imperial authority over Epirus.

=== Nikephoros II Orsini (1335-38, 1356-59) ===
- Alexios Kabasilas (1338-40) - In 1338, Epirote nobleman Alexios Kabasilas led a major anti-imperial uprising and seized Arta to establish an autonomous Epirus, but his rebellion collapsed after Emperor Andronikos III Palaiologos besieged his strongholds in 1340.
- Simeon Uroš (1356-59) - When Nikephoros deposed Simeon, he continued to claim the territories of Epirus until Nikephoros II death.

=== Simeon Uroš (1359-66) ===
- Radoslav Hlapen (1359) - While Simeon Uroš was in Epirus, Radoslav Hlapen of Vodena (Edessa) attempted to seize Thessaly on behalf of his stepson Thomas Preljubović. Simeon Uroš was forced to cut his losses by recognizing Radoslav Hlapen's conquests, turning over Kastoria to him, and marrying his daughter Maria to Thomas.

=== Esau de' Buondelmonti (1385-1411) ===
- John Zenevisi (1386-89) - Following the assassination of the ruthless Despot Thomas Preljubović in 1384, Esau de' Buondelmonti took control of Ioannina by marrying Thomas's widow, Maria Angelina Douka Palaiologina. Discontented local aristocratic factions and chieftain groups led by figures like John Zenevisi and some Albanian nobles launched a series of insurrections and ambushes to overthrow Esau and expel foreign Italian rule from Ioannina.

=== Giorgio de' Buondelmonti (1411) ===
- Maurice Spata (1411) - He sought to take control in Ioannina for himself, sending troops to intimidate the local authorities and ravage the city's outskirts due to the regency council inability to govern.

== See also ==
- List of Byzantine Usurpers
- List of Roman Usurpers
- List of Trapezuntine Usurpers
- Despot of Epirus
