= Carlo Antonio Tocco =

Prince of Montemiletto

- Prince of Montemiletto (Note: Carlo Antonio's full titles among the Italian nobility were Prince of Montemiletto, Count of Monteaperti, Baron of Grumo, Montefalcione, Serra, Manocalzati, Nocelle, Fontanarosa and Calabritto, Lord of Refrancore.)

Prince of Achaea (Neapolitan nobility)
- Reign: 5 March 1678 – 31 January 1701
- Predecessor: Antonio Tocco
- Successor: Leonardo VII Tocco
- Born: 15 March 1668; Naples
- Died: 31 January 1701 (aged 33); Naples
- Spouse: Livia Sanseverino
- Issue: Beatrice Tocco; Marianna Tocco; Dorotea Tocco; Leonardo VII Tocco; Nicola Maria Tocco
- Dynasty: Tocco
- Father: Leonardo VI Tocco
- Mother: Beatrice Ventimiglia

Don Carlo Antonio Tocco (15 March 1668 – 31 January 1701) was a 17th-century Italian noble, serving as the Prince of Montemiletto and the Prince of Achaea from the death of his grandfather Antonio Tocco in 1678 to his own death in 1701.

== Biography ==
Carlo Antonio Tocco was born in Naples on 15 March 1668, as the son of Leonardo VI Tocco and the Italian noblewoman Beatrice Ventimiglia. He had one sibling, his sister Ippolita Tocco (1669–1698). It appears that Leonardo quarrelled with his father (and Carlo Antonio's grandfather) Antonio Tocco over the Tocco family inheritance, given that Leonardo was disinherited from most of their family titles in 1658 and 1666. Leonardo predeceased Antonio, dying on 26 September 1670, when Carlo Antonio was just two years old.

Upon Antonio Tocco's death on 5 March 1678, his titles were inherited by the young Carlo Antonio, who thus became lord of various fiefs the family had acquired in Italy. The most prominent of their lands in Italy was the town of Montemiletto, and Carlo Antonio is attested to have titled himself as the "illustrious prince of Achaea and Montemiletto".

Carlo Antonio further expanded the family lands, buying the fiefs of Nocelle and Fontanarosa from Prince Giovan Battista Ludovisi for 14,500 scudi on 4 August 1687. On 2 June 1688, Carlo Antonio sold the barony of Calabritto, acquired by his grandfather in 1665. Carlo Antonio married Livia Sanseverino, daughter of Carlo Maria Sanseverino, the prince of Bisignano, on 2 June 1688 in Naples.

Carlo Antonio died in Naples on 31 January 1701.

== Family ==
With his wife Livia Sanseverino, Carlo Antonio had five children:

- Beatrice Tocco (24 June 1689 – 6 February 1761), daughter.
- Marianna Tocco (16 August 1691 – 18 October 1758), daughter.
- Dorotea Tocco (23 November 1696 – ?), daughter.
- Leonardo VII Tocco (1 January 1698 – 31 March 1776), son.
- Nicola Maria Tocco (7 May 1700 – 19 March 1769), son.
