= Despot of Epirus =

Ruler of a Byzantine rump state

- Coat of arms of Carlo I Tocco, founder of the last ruling dynasty of Epirus, as count palatine of Cephalonia and Zakynthos (dexter) and as despot of Epirus (sinister)
- Final holder: Leonardo III Tocco; 1448 – 1479

Details
- First monarch: Michael I Komnenos Doukas
- Last monarch: Leonardo III Tocco (ruling); Antonio Tocco (titular)
- Formed: 1205
- Abolished: 1479 (fall of the Despotate); 1642 (last use of title)
- Appointer: Hereditary

The Despot of Epirus was the ruler of the Despotate of Epirus, one of the rump states of the Byzantine Empire in the aftermath of the Fourth Crusade. The name "Despotate of Epirus" and the title "despot of Epirus" are modern historiographical names, and were not in use by the despots themselves. In the Byzantine Empire, the title of despot (Greek: δεσπότης, romanized: despótēs) was a prestigious court title and did not designate rule over some specific territory. Though several of the early Greek rulers of the Epirote realm did use the title of despot, it was never in reference to the lands they governed, but instead in reference to their position in the imperial hierarchy.

It was only with Epirus falling into the hands of foreign dynasties that the title of despot became applied not to the imperial hierarchy, but to the territory, sometimes to the dismay of the local population. "Despot of Epirus" is not recorded in contemporary documents for the rulers of foreign origin, but several other versions are, such as "despot of Arta" and "despot of Ioannina", the two capitals of the despotate at different points in time. Some rulers used the version "despot of Romania" (Romania essentially referring to the territories of the Roman Empire, i.e. Byzantium) or "despot of the Romans" (claiming rulership over the Romans, i.e. the Byzantines/Greeks).

The final despot of Epirus was Leonardo III Tocco, who ruled from 1448 to 1479, when the remnants of the despotate were conquered by the Ottoman Empire. Leonardo escaped into exile and his descendants continued to claim the title until 1642.

This occurred when Antonio Tocco petitioned the King of Spain to be granted the title of Prince of Achaea, in exchange for his patrimonial titles as Despot of Epirus and Count Palatine of Cephalonia and Zakynthos; this new grant mirrored the original princely title held by rulers of the Principality of Achaea, but was a noble title within the Neapolitan nobility, compared to the original sovereign title.

== Title ==
In the Late Byzantine Empire, the title of despot (Ancient Greek: δεσπότης, romanized: despótēs) was a prestigious and elevated court title. It was not used as a ruling title in regards to any specific landed possession. As such, referring to the rulers of the Despotate of Epirus (a non-contemporary term for the state) as "Despots of Epirus" is technically incorrect. The title only became associated with certain territories as the practice of emperors granting the title to princes and granting them semi-authonomous appanages to govern became regularized. Furthermore, not all rulers of Epirus bore the title. The founder of the Epirote realm, Michael I Komnenos Doukas, never used the title and neither did his successor Theodore Komnenos Doukas, who actually crowned himself emperor (basileus) at Thessalonica c. 1225. The first ruler of Epirus to receive the title of despot was Michael II, from his uncle Manuel of Thessalonica in the 1230s, and then again, as a sign of submission and vassalage, from the Nicaean emperor John III Vatatzes.

Use of a version of the title despot actually associated with territory began under the rule of the Orsini family, following the extinction of the original Komnenos Doukas dynasty. Of Italian descent, the Orsini rulers rendered their title as Despotus Romaniae ("Despot of Romania"). Epirus was a part of Romania (not meaning the modern country, but essentially "the territories of the Roman Empire", i.e. Byzantium). Thomas II Preljubović, who was granted Epirus by its previous ruler, claimant Serbian emperor Simeon Uroš, was granted the dignity of despot by Simeon and titled himself as the "Despot of Ioannina" to designate his rule over his capital Ioannina and all of Epirus.

Upon becoming the ruler of Ioannina in 1411, Carlo I Tocco assumed the title of despot, either as a reference to the Komnenos Doukas and Orsini despots, or to the title assumed by Thomas II Preljubović. The locals insisted that Carlo seek recognition of that title from the Byzantine emperor, and after having sent his brother Leonardo to Constantinople, Emperor Manuel II Palaiologos formally recognized him as despot. To Carlo, the title of despot meant that he could claim rulership over all of Epirus, not just Ioannina; he notably captured Arta, capital under the Komnenos Doukas and Orsini, in 1416. To the Byzantines in Constantinople, the granting of the title served more to buffer the lack of actual imperial control in the region, only being a nominal reference to the power previously exercised in Epirus by Greek despots. From 1418 onwards, Carlo rendered his title in Latin as Despotus Romaniae, as the Orsini despots had done before him. This title had also been used by Centurione II Zaccaria, Prince of Achaea, and Carlo might have assumed it in 1418 not as a reference to previous rulers of Epirus, but essentially as a usurpation of Centurione's (his former feudal overlord) title after the Prince of Achaea had suffered devastating losses of territory to the Byzantines in that same year. Epirote sources write that the title Despotus Romaniae was confirmed by Manuel II, but contemporary Byzantine sources are silent on the matter. Documents from Ioannia and Arta give Carlo the full title Dominus Carolus Dei Gratia despotus Romaniae ("Lord Carlo, by the grace of God, Despot of Romania").

Carlo also sometimes used the version Despotus Romeorum ("Despot of the Romans", i.e. the Byzantines/Greeks) from 1418 onwards. This version of the title had even more dangerous implications for Constantinople, as it implied rulership over the Byzantine people themselves rather than territory they considered part of their empire. To the Byzantines, such power could only legally be exercised by the emperor. Carlo I's successor, Carlo II Tocco, used the title "Despot of Arta", which connected him to the old capital of the Epirote realm rather than to the territory of the Byzantine Empire at large. Even then, "Despot of Arta" was no more acceptable to the Byzantines than "Despot of Romania" as it was still in relation to a specific territory, rather than on the position of a despot relative to the emperor in court hierarchy. This title was also used by Carlo II's successor, Leonardo III Tocco. Later members of the Tocco family, pretenders to the title, used both "Despot of Romania" and "Despot of Arta"; a 1697 Italian text titles the despots of the Tocco family as Despoti de Romanìa, & del'Arta ("Despots of Romania and of Arta").

== List of despots of Epirus, 1205–1479 ==
=== Komnenos Doukas dynasty (1205–1318) ===
Image	Name	Reign	Succession & notes	Ref
	Michael I Komnenos Doukas; Μιχαήλ Κομνηνός Δούκας (Michaēl Komnēnos Doukas)	1205–1215	Cousin of Byzantine emperors Isaac II Angelos and Alexios III Angelos, established himself as ruler of Epirus in the aftermath of the Fourth Crusade's sack and capture of Constantinople.	
	Theodore Komnenos Doukas; Θεόδωρος Κομνηνὸς Δούκας (Theodōros Komnēnos Doukas)	1215–1230	Half-brother of Michael I Komnenos Doukas. Aimed to capture Constantinople and restore the Byzantine Empire, being proclaimed emperor at Thessalonica in 1224.	
	Michael II Komnenos Doukas; Μιχαήλ Κομνηνός Δούκας (Michaēl Komnēnos Doukas)	1230–1271	Illegitimate son of Michael I Komnenos Doukas. Proclaimed himself the ruler of Epirus in the aftermath of Theodore's defeat at the Battle of Klokotnitsa.	
	Nikephoros I Komnenos Doukas; Νικηφόρος Κομνηνός Δούκας (Nikēphoros Komnēnos Doukas)	1271–1297	Son of Michael II Komnenos Doukas.	
	Thomas I Komnenos Doukas; Θωμάς Κομνηνός Δούκας (Thōmas Komnēnos Doukas)	1297–1318	Son of Nikephoros I Komnenos Doukas. Murdered by his nephew, Nicholas Orsini.	

=== Orsini dynasty, line of Maria Komnene Doukaina (1318–1359) ===
Image	Name	Reign	Succession & notes	Ref
	Nicholas Orsini; Νικόλαος Ορσίνι (Nikolaos Orsini)	1318–1323	Grandson of Nikephoros I Komnenos Doukas and husband of the widow of Thomas I Komnenos Doukas. Killed by his brother, John Orsini.	
	John II Orsini (Note: John II's regnal number derives from John I Orsini, who was not the ruler of Epirus but Count Palatine of Cephalonia and Zakynthos.); Ἰωάννης Κομνηνός Δούκας (Iōannēs Komnēnos Doukas)	1323–1335	Grandson of Nikephoros I Komnenos Doukas. Killed by his wife, Anna Palaiologina.	
	Nikephoros II Orsini; Νικηφόρος Δούκας (Nikēphoros Doukas) (first reign)	1335–1338/1340	Son of John Orsini, ruled under the regency of his mother Anna Palaiologina.	
1338/1340–1348: The Byzantine Empire under Andronikos III Palaiologos recaptures Epirus in 1338; it is briefly restored to independence with the help of Catherine, titular Latin Empress, before being recaptured by the Byzantines again in 1340. John Angelos serves as governor.
1348–1356: The Serbian Empire under Stefan Dušan conquers Epirus; Simeon Uroš, Stefan's half-brother, is appointed governor.
	Nikephoros II Orsini; Νικηφόρος Δούκας (Nikēphoros Doukas) (second reign)	1356–1359	Returned to the Epirote throne through retaking Epirus from the Serbian Empire. Died in battle against an Albanian revolt.	

=== Nemanjić dynasty (1359–1385) ===
Image	Name	Reign	Succession & notes	Ref
	Simeon Uroš; Симеон Урош, Συμεών Ούρεσης Παλαιολόγος (Simeon Uroš, Simeon Ouresēs Palaiologos)	1359–1366	Claimant Serbian emperor; established himself as the ruler of Epirus and Thessaly. Married Thomais Orsini, daughter of John Orsini. Previously Serbian governor of Epirus.	
	Thomas II Preljubović; Тома Прељубовић, Θωμάς Κομνηνός Παλαιολόγος (Toma Preljubović, Thōmas Komnēnos Palaiologos)	1366–1384	Married to Maria Angelina, daughter of Simeon Uroš. Made ruler of the city Ioannina and other parts of Epirus by Simeon.	
	Maria Angelina; Μαρία Αγγελίνα Δούκαινα Παλαιολογίνα (Maria Angelina Doukaina Palaiologina)	1384–1385	Daughter of Simeon Uroš and widow of Thomas II Preljubović. Proclaimed ruler by the populace of Ioannina. Assumed the title basilissa ("empress").	

=== Buondelmonti dynasty (1385–1411) ===
Image	Name	Reign	Succession & notes	Ref
	Esau de' Buondelmonti; Ησαύ Μπουοντελμόντι (Esau Bouontelmonti)	1385–1411	Second husband of Maria Angelina. The two were married on the suggestion of John Uroš, Maria's brother.	
	Giorgio de' Buondelmonti; Γεώργιος Μπουοντελμόντι (Geōrgios Bouontelmonti)	1411	Son of Esau de' Buondelmonti by Jevdokija Balšić. Briefly ruler of Ioannina under the regency of his mother, who was unpopular. Deposed by the local nobility in favour of Carlo I Tocco.	

=== Tocco dynasty (1411–1479) ===
Image	Name	Reign	Succession & notes	Ref
	Carlo I Tocco; Κάρολος Τόκκος (Karolos Tokkos)	1411–1429	Son of Maddalena de' Buondelmonti, sister of Esau de' Buondelmonti. Invited to become the new ruler of Ioannina after the locals deposed Giorgio de' Buondelmonti.	
	Carlo II Tocco; Κάρολος Τόκκος (Karolos Tokkos)	1429–1448	Nephew and legitimate heir of Carlo I Tocco. Warred with the illegitimate sons of Carlo I Tocco, who tried to claim the despotate. Carlo II's reign saw the loss of most mainland territories to the Ottomans.	
	Leonardo III Tocco (Note: Leonardo III's regnal number derives from Leonardo I and Leonardo II Tocco, who were not rulers of Epirus but Count Palatine of Cephalonia and Zakynthos and Lord of Zakynthos, respectively.); Λεονάρδος Τόκκος (Leonardos Tokkos)	1448–1479	Son of Carlo II Tocco. Inherited the despotate as a minor, ruling under the regency of four of his tutors during his early years as despot. Fled to Naples when his final territories were conquered by the Ottomans in 1479.	

== Titular despots of Epirus, 1479–1642 ==
Image	Name	Claim	Succession & notes	Ref
	Leonardo III Tocco	1479 – c. 1503 (previously ruling despot 1448–1479)	Lived in exile in Rome and in Naples after the fall of the despotate. Received valuable fiefs in southern Italy but had lost them by the time of his death.	
	Carlo III Tocco	c. 1503 – 1518	Son of Leonardo III Tocco and Milica Branković, granddaughter of Thomas Palaiologos.	
	Leonardo IV Tocco	1518–1564	Son of Carlo III Tocco.	
	Francesco Tocco	1564–1596	Son of Leonardo IV Tocco.	
	Leonardo V Tocco	1596–1641	Son of Francesco Tocco.	
	Antonio Tocco	1641–1642	Son of Leonardo V Tocco. In 1642, Antonio exchanged his titles for the Neapolitan title Prince of Achaea. This exchange was confirmed by Philip IV of Spain. He continued to live in exile under the new title, dying in 1678.	

With Antonio Tocco's submission of the title along with the Palatine Comital title in 1642, the Tocco family ceased to use the title Despot of Epirus. Antonio's male-line descendants instead began to use their new grant of Prince of Achaea within the Neapolitan nobility. The change in titulature might be attributable to the Tocchi being the most senior descendants of Thomas Palaiologos, Despot of the Morea, following the extinction of his last certain male-line descendants in the 16th century. Thomas Palaiologos had married the designated heiress of Centurione II Zaccaria, the Prince of Achaea, as per the Chalandritsa negotiations between the two rulers in 1429, and as such, had inherited the territories of the principality upon Centurione's death in 1432.

== Family Tree ==
Despots of Epiros

Alexios I Komnenos; EMPEROR OF THE ROMANS; 1081–1118 c. 1057–1118 ∞Irene Doukaina
Theodore Komnene; Sebastohypertate; 1096–a.1137 ∞Constantine Angelos
John Doukas; Sebastokrator c. 1125/7–c. 1200	Zoe Doukaina
Michael I Komnenos Doukas; RULER OF EPIROS c. 1205–1214/5 c. 1170–1214/5	Constantine Komnenos Doukas; Despotes c. 1172–c. 1242	Theodore Komnenos Doukas; Emperor of the Romans; 1224–1230; RULER OF EPIROS; 1215–1230 c. 1180–c. 1253	Manuel Doukas; Emperor of the Romans; 1230–1237 c. 1187–c. 1241
Michael II Komnenos Doukas; DESPOT OF EPIROS (1230) 1249–1266/8 c. 1206–1266/8 ∞Theodora of Arta	John Komnenos Doukas; Emperor of the Romans; 1237–1242 c. 1210–1244	Demetrios Angelos Doukas; Despot of Thessaloniki; 1244–1246 c. 1220–a.1246
Nikephoros I Komnenos Doukas; DESPOT OF EPIROS; 1266/8–1297 c. 1240–1297; 1.∞ Maria Laskaris Vatatzaina; 2.∞Anna Palaiologina Kantakouzene	Demetrios Doukas Komnenos Koutroules; Despotes c. 1250–c. 1304 ∞Anna Komnene Palaiologina	John I Doukas; Sebastokrator of Thessaly (1268) c. 1272–1289 c. 1230–1289
2. Thomas I Komnenos Doukas; DESPOT OF EPIROS; 1297–1318; 1266/8–1297; ∞Anna Palaiologina (1)	1.Maria Komnene Doukaina c. 1257–a.1304 ∞John I Orsini	Andronikos Angelos Palaiologos; Protosebastos c. 1282–c. 1328
Nicholas Angelos Orsini; DESPOT OF EPIROS; 1318–1323 c. 1295–1323 ∞Anna Palaiologina (2)	John II Doukas Komnenos Angelos Orsini; DESPOT OF EPIROS; 1323–1335 c. 1300–1335	Anna Palaiologina; REGENT OF EPIROS; 1337–1338 c. 1310– a.1363	Margaret Orsini ∞ Guglielmo Tocco
Nikephoros II Doukas Angelos Orsini; DESPOT OF EPIROS (1335–1338); 1356–1359; 1328–1359 ∞ Maria Kantakouzene}	Thomais Komnene Angelina Orsini c. 1330– a. 1349	Simeon Uroš Palaiologos; Emperor of the Serbs and Romans; 1356–1370; DESPOT OF EPIROS; 1359–1366 c. 1326–1380
Esau de' Buondelmonti; DESPOT OF EPIROS (1385) 1386–1411 c. 1350–1411 ∞ Jevdokija Balšić	Maria Angelina Doukaina Palaiologina; BASILISSA OF EPIROS; 1384–1385; 1349– 1394	Thomas Komnenos Palaiologos Preljubović; DESPOT OF EPIROS; 1367–1384 c. 1340–1384	Leonardo I Katakouzenos Tocco; Count Palatine of Cephalonia and Zakynthos; 1357–1375/7 c. 1330–1375/7 ∞ Maddalena de' Buondelmonti
Giorgio de' Buondelmonti; DESPOT OF EPIROS; 1411; 1411–a. 1435	Carlo I Katakouzenos Tocco; DESPOT OF EPIROS; 1411 (1415)–1429 c. 1365–1429	Leonardo II Katakouzenos Tocco; Megas Konostaulos; 1375/6–1418/9	Manuel II Palaiologos; EMPEROR OF THE ROMANS; 1391–1425; 1350–1425
Carlo II Katakouzenos Tocco; DESPOT OF EPIROS; 1429–1448 c. 1400–1448	Theodora Tocco c. 1400–1429	Constantine XI Palaiologos; EMPEROR OF THE ROMANS; 1449–1453; Despot of the Morea; 1428–1449; 1404–1453	Thomas Palaiologos; Despot of the Morea; 1428–1460 (1465); 1409–1465
Leonardo III Katakouzenos Tocco; DESPOT OF EPIROS; 1448–1479 (c. 1503) a. 1436–c. 1503	Helena Palaiologina; 1431–1471
Carlo III Katakouzenos Tocco; DESPOT OF EPIROS c. 1503–1518 a. 1436–c. 1503

== See also ==
- List of Epirote usurpers
- List of Trapezuntine Emperors
- List of Roman Emperors
