= Leonardo V Tocco =

- Lord of Refrancore, Baron of Apice and Tinchiano

Despot of Epirus Count Palatine of Cephalonia and Zakynthos (titular)
- Reign: 16 August 1596 – 24 January 1641
- Predecessor: Francesco Tocco
- Successor: Antonio Tocco
- Born: 1591; Alessandria (?)
- Died: 24 January 1641 (aged 49); Rome, Papal States
- Spouse: Francesca Pignatelli
- Issue: Carlo Tocco; Cesare Tocco; Ippolita Veronica Tocco; Antonio Tocco; Giovanni Battista Tocco; Ippolita Maria Tocco; Giuseppe Tocco; Maria Francesca Tocco; Eleonora Tocco; Cesare Tocco; Cesare Tocco; Teresa Tocco
- Dynasty: Tocco
- Father: Francesco Tocco
- Mother: Veronica Malaspina

Leonardo V Tocco (1591 – 24 January 1641) was the titular Despot of Epirus and Count Palatine of Cephalonia and Zakynthos from the death of his father Francesco Tocco in 1596 to his own death in 1641. In addition to holding titular claims to lordships in Greece, Leonardo was also the lord of Refrancore in Montferrat, Italy, as well as Apice and Tinchiano, which he purchased in 1639. Upon Leonardo's death, his claims and titles were inherited by his son, Antonio Tocco.

== Biography ==
Leonardo V Tocco was the son of Francesco Tocco, the titular Despot of Epirus and Count Palatine of Cephalonia and Zakynthos, and the Italian noblewoman Veronica Malaspina. Leonardo was baptized on 2 June 1591 in Alessandria. In addition to inheriting his father's claims to lands in Greece, Leonardo also inherited his status as a patrician of Venice and the lord of Refrancore in Montferrat.

On 28 November 1613, Leonardo married Francesca Pignatelli, daughter of the Neapolitan patrician Cesare Pignatelli. They evidently lived together in Naples, given that all of their children, from 1615 to 1631, were born there. The contemporary Neapolitan composer Oddo Savelli Palombara dedicated one of his sonnets, concerning wars between Italians and the Ottomans, to Leonardo.

In 1639, Leonardo expanded his family's holdings in Italy by purchasing the fiefs of Apice and Tinchiano for 43,433 ducats, 1 tarì and 13 grana. He died on 24 January 1641 in Rome.

== Family ==
With his wife Francesca, Leonardo V had twelve children:

- Carlo Tocco (6 January 1615 – 10 July 1630), the eldest son, died at the age of fifteen.
- Cesare Tocco (16 January 1616 – ?), son who died in infancy.
- Ippolita Veronica Tocco (15 June 1617 – ?), the eldest daughter, became a Benedictine nun in Naples in 1633, living under the name 'sister Veronica' at the Santa Patrizia monastery.
- Antonio Tocco (16 August 1618 – 5 March 1678), the eldest living son at the time of Leonardo's death and thus the heir to his claims and titles.
- Giovanni Battista Tocco (10 May 1620 – ?), son who was made rector of the church of San Marco at Apice, appointed by the archbishop of Benevento on 24 August 1626. He left his duties at Apice on 7 November 1637.
- Ippolita Maria Tocco (22 May 1621 – ?), daughter who became a Benedictine nun in Naples in 1642, residing in the same monastery as her sister Ippolita Veronica, under tha name 'sister Maria Arcangela'.
- Giuseppe Tocco (? – 3 January 1662), son, married Girolama Carafa, daughter of a Neapolitan patrician, with whom he had the two daughters Francesca and Dorotea.
- Maria Francesca Tocco (18 September 1624 – ?), daughter who became a Franciscan nun in Naples in 1645, residing in the Capuccinelle monastery under the name 'sister Maria'.
- Eleonora Tocco (25 December 1625 – ?), daughter who died in infancy.
- Cesare Tocco (18 October 1627 – ?), son who died in infancy.
- Cesare Tocco (18 June 1629 – ?), son who died in infancy.
- Teresa Tocco (22 September 1631 – ?), daughter who became a Benedictine nun in Naples in 1648, residing in the same monastery as her sisters Ippolita Veronica and Ippolita Maria, under tha name 'sister Maria Caterina'.

Leonardo V Tocco Tocco dynasty Born: 1591 Died: 24 January 1641
Titles in pretence
Preceded by Francesco Tocco	— TITULAR — Despot of Epirus; 1596–1641	Succeeded by Antonio Tocco
Preceded by Francesco Tocco	— TITULAR — Count Palatine of Cephalonia and Zakynthos; 1596–1641	Succeeded by Antonio Tocco
