= Emperor of the Romans =

The title Emperor of the Romans was a title used by medieval and modern claimants to the position of Roman emperor. Ancient Roman emperors had only used the title Imperator ('emperor') and Augustus ('venerable') without specification because in their time there (usually) was only a single emperor.

- the German Holy Roman emperors, used the title Imperator Romanorum (Emperor of the Romans) from 800 to 1806.
- the Byzantine emperors, direct heirs of the ancient Roman emperors, used the title basileus ton Romaion (Emperor of the Romans) in response to the Holy Roman usage, from 812 until the end of their empire in 1453.
- the Latin emperors, who controlled Constantinople from 1204 to 1261, occasionally used the title.
- some rulers of Bulgaria, such as Simeon I and Kaloyan, used the title "Emperor of the Bulgarians and the Romans".
- the Serbian emperors titled themselves as "Emperor of the Serbs and Romans" from 1346 to 1371.
- Mehmed II of the Ottoman Empire, used the title kayser-i rûm (Caesar of the Romans), following the Conquest of Constantinople in 1453.
