= Leonardo IV Tocco =

- Lord of Refrancore

Despot of Epirus Count Palatine of Cephalonia and Zakynthos (titular)
- Reign: 1518–1564
- Predecessor: Carlo III Tocco
- Successor: Francesco Tocco
- Born: c. 1510
- Died: 1564 (aged c. 54)
- Spouse: Maddalena (Graziosa) Colli
- Issue: Carlo Tocco; Francesco Tocco; Giovanni Tocco; Costantino Tocco; Stratonica Tocco
- Dynasty: Tocco
- Father: Carlo III Tocco
- Mother: Andronica Arianiti

Leonardo IV Tocco (full name Giovanni Leonardo Tocco, c. 1510–1564) was the titular Despot of Epirus and Count Palatine of Cephalonia and Zakynthos from the death of his father Carlo III Tocco in 1518 to his own death in 1564. His mother was Andronica Arianiti, daughter of Constantine Arianiti, also a claimant to various lands in Greece. From his maternal grandfather, Leonardo was granted the fortress of Refrancore, which he held under the title signore (lord).

== Biography ==
Leonardo IV Tocco, born at some point in the 1510s, was the son and heir of Carlo III Tocco, titular Despot of Epirus and Count Palatine of Cephalonia and Zakynthos. Leonardo's mother was Andronica Arianiti, a daughter of Constantine Arianiti, another claimant to various lands in Greece. Following the fall of the Despotate of Epirus in 1479 and the loss of the family's lands in Greece, the Tocco family lived as exiles in Italy.

Upon Carlo III's death in 1518, Leonardo inherited his titles. He also gained several other distinctions and honours. As a nobleman, he is attested as a patrician of Venice and as the Lord (signore) of Refrancore. The fortress of Refrancore had been granted to Leonardo by his maternal grandfather, Constantine Arianiti, who periodically served as regent of the nearby Montferrat. At points he also served as a councillor of the viceroys of Naples. Leonardo owned several mills in Italy as well as some stores in the markets of Milan. Altogether, his assets granted him an annual income of 400 scudi.

Leonardo married Maddalena (Graziosa) Colli, daughter of Cesare Colli, Lord of Quattordio and patrician of Alessandria. The couple had five children together; four sons and one daughter. Maddalena predeceased Leonardo, dying on 16 February 1560. Leonardo died four years later, at some point in 1564. The executor of his will, dated to 6 June 1564, was Benedetto Carbonato.

== Family ==
With his wife Maddalena, Leonardo IV had the following five children:

- Carlo Tocco (? – shortly after 6 June 1564), patrician of Venice. He is attested as having been married, but the name of his wife is not recorded. Had a son, Giovan Domenico Leonardo, dead before 6 June 1564, and a daughter, Costanza.
- Francesco Tocco (? – 16 August 1596), Lord of Refrancore, patrician of Venice and heir to Leonardo IV's titles. Married Veronica Malaspina. The line of Tocco claimants continued through Francesco and his son Leonardo V Tocco.
- Giovanni Tocco (? – 12 May 1626), Lord of Refrancore (consignore, alongside Francesco), patrician of Venice and Naples. Served as a member of the city council of Capua in 1600 and worked as an infantry captain in Portugal. Married Beatrice Salinas de Hermosa. They couple had four children; sons Carlo and Gonsalvo as well as daughters Costanza and Porzia.
- Costantino Tocco (? – before 16 August 1596; will dated to 15 December 1588), infantry captain in Portugal. Married a woman by the name Giuliana whose noble house is uncertain. They had only a single child, the daughter Andronica.
- Stratonica (or Andronica) Tocco (? – after 9 June 1583), their only daughter. Patrician of Venice.

Leonardo IV Tocco Tocco dynasty Born: c. 1510 Died: 1564
Italian nobility
Preceded by Constantine Arianiti	Lord of Refrancore ?–1564	Succeeded by Francesco and Giovanni Tocco
Titles in pretence
Preceded by Carlo III Tocco	— TITULAR — Despot of Epirus; 1518–1564	Succeeded by Francesco Tocco
Preceded by Carlo III Tocco	— TITULAR — Count Palatine of Cephalonia and Zakynthos; 1518–1564	Succeeded by Francesco Tocco
