= Manocalzati =

- Comune
- Comune di Manocalzati
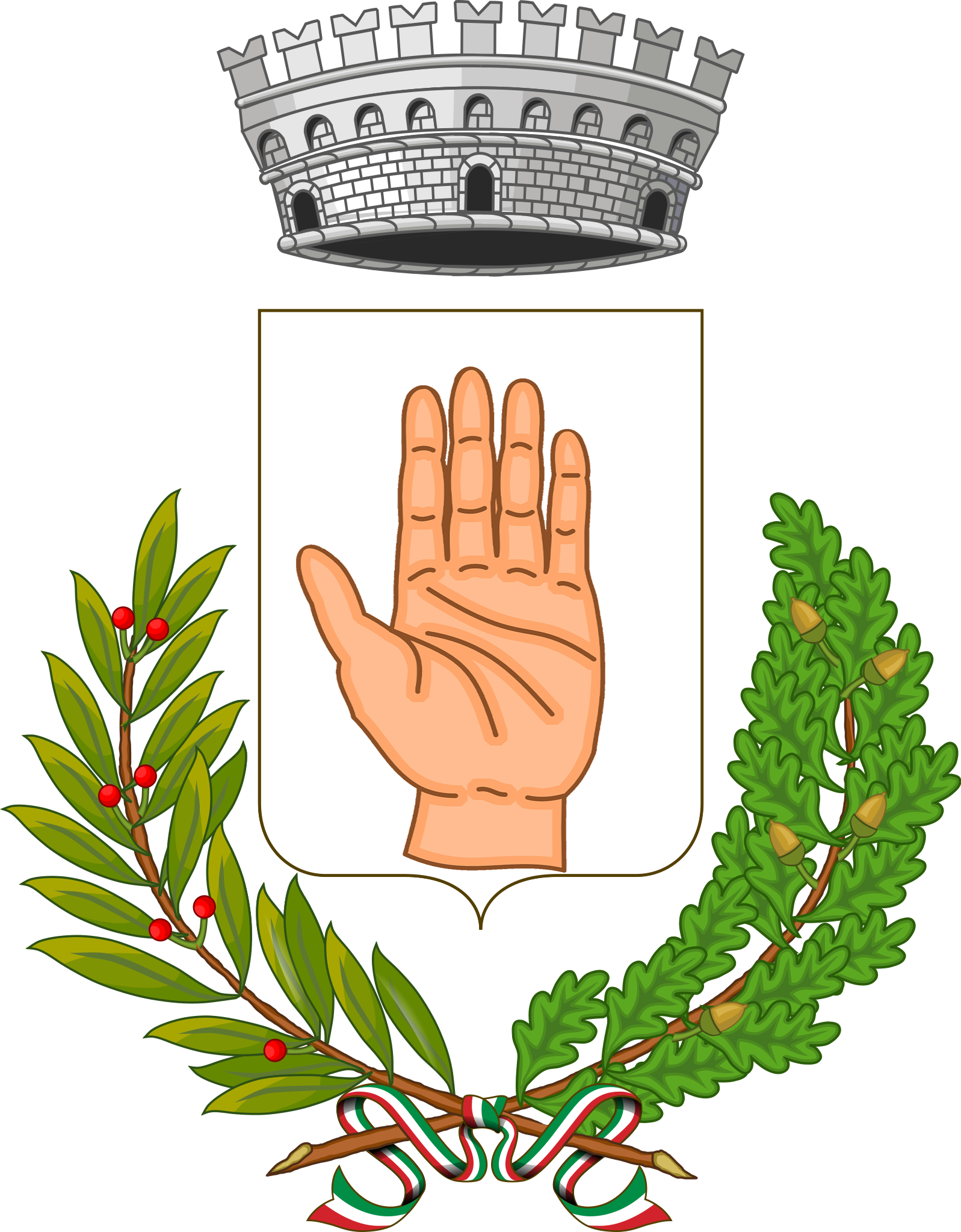
- Coat of arms

- Location within Italy Location within Campania
- Coordinates: 40°56′33″N 14°51′2″E
- Country: Italy
- Region: Campania
- Province: Avellino (AV)
- Frazioni: San Barbato

Government
  - Mayor: Lucio Pasquale Tirone

Area
  - Total: 8.62 km^{2} (3.33 sq mi)
- Elevation: 450 m (1,480 ft)

Population (31 December 2017)
  - Total: 3,198
  - Density: 371/km^{2} (961/sq mi)
- Demonym: Manocalzatesi
- Time zone: UTC+1 (CET)
  - Summer (DST): UTC+2 (CEST)
- Postal code: 83030
- Dialing code: 0825
- Patron saint: St. Mark the Evangelist
- Saint day: 25 April
- Website: Official website

Manocalzati (Irpino: Manëcaozàti) is a town and comune in the province of Avellino, Campania, Southern Italy. The area produces chestnuts, nuts and grapes.

== History ==
Traces from the Iron Age indicate this town existed in the 8th century BC.

Manocalzati was later a fiefdom of the San Barbato family.

== Main sights ==
The town retains its original medieval appearance, with narrow streets and palaces with decorated portals from the 18th and 19th centuries. There are two churches from the 18th century: Saint Michael (belltower built in the 16th century) and Saint Anna.

Within Manocalzati is San Barbato, a small hamlet overlooking the Serinese valley. Its medieval architecture is composed of houses surrounding a medieval castle.
