= Carlo de Tocco =

Italian aristocrat, nobleman and military officer

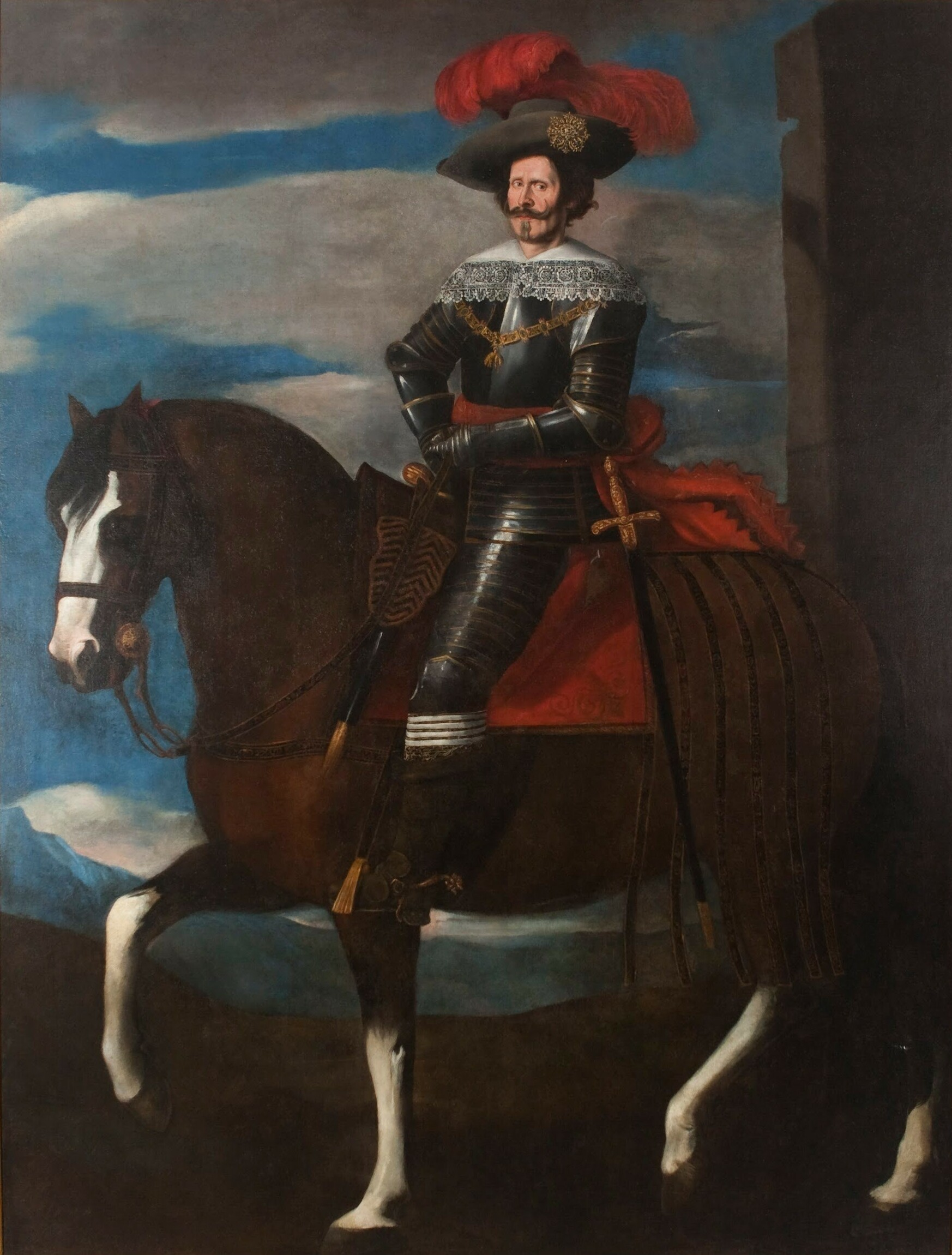
Portrait of Carlo di Tocco

Carlo de Tocco (11 August 1592 – 14 February 1674), titular Duke of Leucada and Prince of Montemiletto, was an Italian aristocrat, nobleman and military officer.

== Biography ==
Tocco was born into the Tocco family that had previously ruled the Republic of Genoa during the 14th century and the Despotate of Epirus during the 15th century.
His father was Giovanni di Tocco, consignore di Refrancore and his grandfather Leonardo IV Tocco.

Tocco fought during the 30 Years' War for the Holy Roman Empire. In 1642 he was made a Knight of the Order of the Golden Fleece.

== Sources ==
- Fine, John Van Antwerp Jr. (1994) [1987]. The Late Medieval Balkans: A Critical Survey from the Late Twelfth Century to the Ottoman Conquest. Ann Arbor, Michigan: University of Michigan Press. ISBN 0472082604.
- Zečević, Nada (2014). The Tocco of the Greek Realm: Nobility, Power and Migration in Latin Greece (14th-15th centuries). Belgrade: Makart. ISBN 9788691944100.
