= Carlo III Tocco =

Despot of Epirus Count Palatine of Cephalonia and Zakynthos (titular)
- Pretension: c. 1503–1519
- Predecessor: Leonardo III Tocco
- Successor: Leonardo IV Tocco
- Born: 1464; Lefkada
- Died: 1519 (aged c. 55); Rome
- Spouse: Andronica Arianiti
- Issue: Leonardo IV Tocco
- Dynasty: Tocco
- Father: Leonardo III Tocco
- Mother: Milica Branković

Carlo III Tocco (1464–1519) was the titular despot of Epirus and count palatine of Cephalonia and Zakynthos from the death of his father Leonardo III Tocco c. 1503 to his own death in 1519. Carlo lived in Rome, where he received pensions from both the Papacy and the Kingdom of Naples. As an adult, Carlo worked as a military officer, serving both the Papacy and Emperor Maximilian I.

Carlo was deeply bitter about the loss of his family's lands in Greece. He married Andronica Arianiti, daughter of Constantine Arianiti, another claimant to lands in Greece, and presented himself not only as the head of the former Epirote despotic family, but also as the heir of the Serbian Branković dynasty and the Byzantine imperial Palaiologos dynasty (though no titles were claimed).

== Biography ==
Carlo III Tocco was the eldest son of Leonardo III Tocco, born on the island of Lefkada in 1464. Carlo's mother, Milica Branković, was the daughter of Lazar Branković, despot of Serbia, and Helena Palaiologina, a daughter of Thomas Palaiologos, the youngest brother of the final Byzantine emperor, Constantine XI Palaiologos. Carlo's father was the last ruling despot of Epirus, losing his last lands in Greece in 1479 to conquest by the Ottoman Empire. Leonardo, his wife Francesca Marzano (Milica having died in 1464), two of his brothers, and Carlo fled to Italy, where they were received by King Ferdinand I of Naples, the uncle of Leonardo's new wife.

Although Leonardo was granted pensions and fiefs in Italy by Ferdinand, they were not prosperous enough to sustain him, his entourage and his family, and were also far from the military aid Leonardo had expected to retake his Greek lands. It was not long before Leonardo found himself in considerable debt, and had lost most of the fiefs he had received. On 29 February 1480, Leonardo, his brothers and Carlo arrived in Rome, seeking money from Pope Sixtus IV. Leonardo was given a more generous pension of 2000 gold pieces in Rome, and rented a house between the Botteghe Oscure and the Via Pellicciaria. After Leonardo's death at some point in the pontificate of Pope Alexander VI (r. 1492–1503), Carlo continued to live in Rome, and served there as captain of the Sacred College. He lived in a house in the Via di S. Marco and enjoying pensions provided by both the pope and the Kingdom of Naples. The generosity of Naples was not as great as it could have been, given that Ferdinand I, who had promised Leonardo that he would treat Carlo as his own son, had been deposed by King Charles VIII of France, who thereafter took control of the Neapolitan kingdom.

Carlo was deeply bitter about the fate of his family's lands in Greece and was discontent over their loss in status and power. In one lamenting document, Carlo is recorded to have referred to his family's fate as a "calamity and rejection of fortune". In the same text, he referred to himself as an heir and descendant of "the despots of Romania and Arta (Note: The modern rendition of the title of rulers of the Despotate of Epirus as 'Despot of Epirus' is a historiographical invention, with the title commonly being rendered as 'Despot of Romania' in contemporary times, 'Romania' meaning "land of the Romans" and being a common endonym for the Byzantine Empire. Arta was the capital of the Despotate of Epirus.) [and] the most serene houses of Serbia, Komnenoi and Palaiologoi, both imperial houses of Constantinople". The claim by Carlo and his descendants that they represented not only the Epirote despotal family, but also the Serbian royal dynasty and the Byzantine imperial one, was not illegitimate given that they represented the heirs of Thomas Palaiologos in the female line. The last fully documented and certain male-line descendants of Thomas Palaiologos died off in the early 16th century, (Note: After Thomas's death in 1465, his claims were taken up by his eldest son, Andreas Palaiologos, who died in 1502. Andreas is commonly believed to not have left any descendants. If Andreas was childless, his heir would have been his younger brother, Manuel Palaiologos, who had moved back to Constantinople and lived under Ottoman rule. Manuel died at some point in the reign of Sultan Bayezid II (r. 1481–1512). Manuel's only documented son to reach adulthood, named Andreas Palaiologos after Manuel's brother, converted to Islam and died in the reign of Suleiman the Magnificent (r. 1520–1566). Manuel's son is not believed to have had children of his own. Though later members of the family are attested, the abundance of people unrelated to the imperial dynasty who bore the name, and forgers, makes the lineage of any later Palaiologoi uncertain and questionable.) and Helena Palaiologina, Carlo's grandmother, was Thomas's oldest daughter. Out of Helena's three daughters, Carlo's mother was the eldest to have children.

After his father's death, Carlo also fought in the armies of Maximilian I, Holy Roman Emperor. Carlo died in his house in the Via S. Marco in early 1519, during the pontificate of Pope Leo X (r. 1513–1521). Carlo had married Andronica Arianiti, a daughter of Constantine Arianiti, self-proclaimed titular 'Prince of Macedonia' and 'Duke of Achaea'. Carlo's claims were continued by his and Andronica's only child, the son Leonardo IV Tocco, born some eight months before his father's death.

== Notes ==
Carlo III Tocco Tocco dynasty Born: 1464 Died: 1518
Titles in pretence
Preceded by Leonardo III Tocco	— TITULAR — Despot of Epirus c. 1503–1518	Succeeded by Leonardo IV Tocco
Preceded by Leonardo III Tocco	— TITULAR — Count Palatine of Cephalonia and Zakynthos c. 1503–1518	Succeeded by Leonardo IV Tocco
