= Monteaperti =

- Frazione
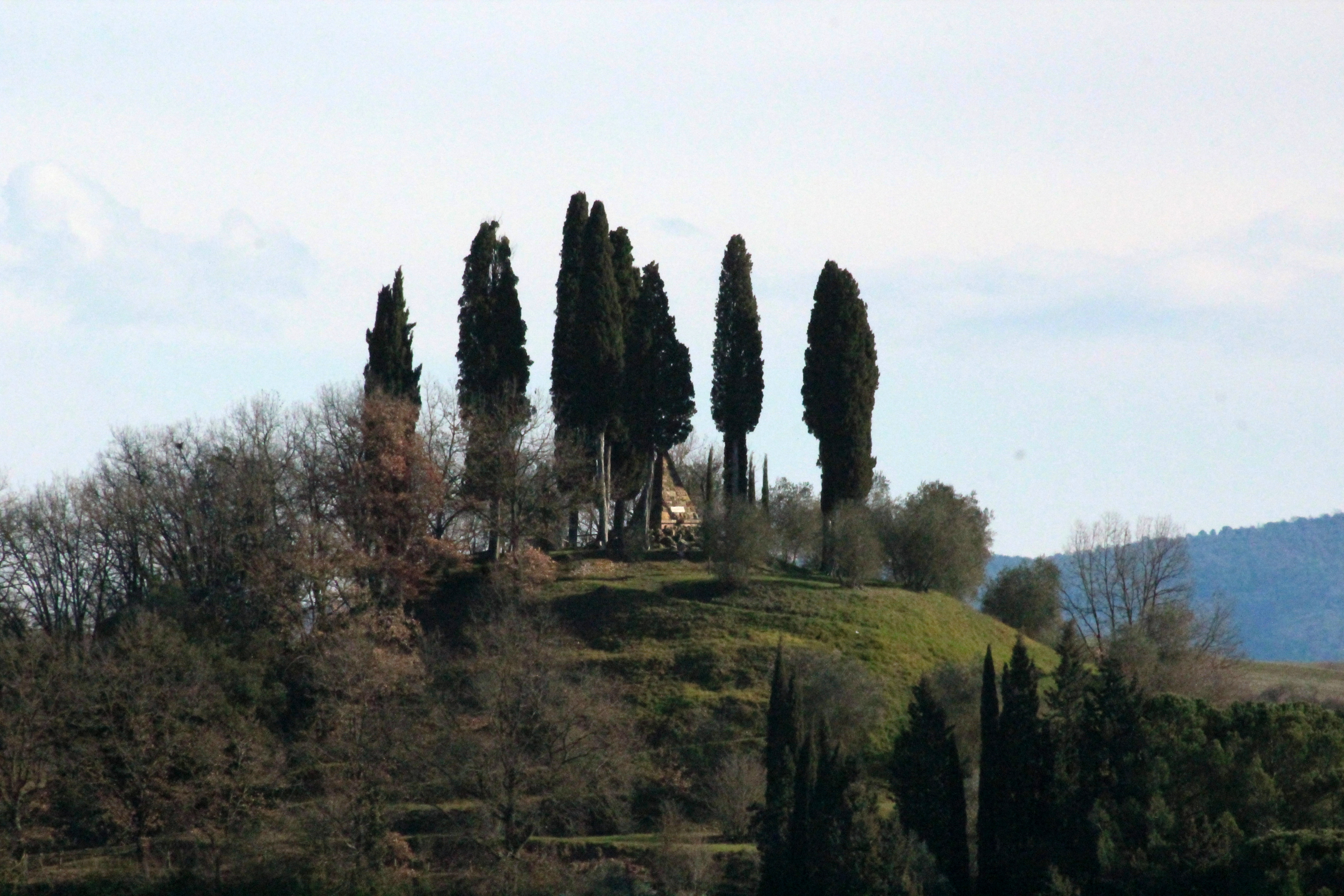
- The Battle of Montaperti Memorial

- Location of Monteaperti in Italy
- Coordinates: 43°19′40″N 11°25′53″E
- Country: Italy
- Region: Tuscany
- Province: Siena (SI)
- Comune: Castelnuovo Berardenga
- Elevation: 252 m (827 ft)

Population (2011)
  - Total: 652
- Time zone: UTC+1 (CET)
  - Summer (DST): UTC+2 (CEST)

Monteaperti (or Montaperti) is a village in Tuscany, central Italy, administratively a frazione of the comune of Castelnuovo Berardenga, province of Siena. At the time of the 2001 census its population was 465. Monteaperti is about 12 km from Siena and 8 km from Castelnuovo Berardenga.

The place is known for being the scene of the battle of Montaperti (1260) between the Republic of Florence and the Republic of Siena.
