= Refrancore =

- Comune
- Comune di Refrancore
- Coat of arms

- Location within Italy Location within Piedmont
- Coordinates: 44°56′14″N 8°20′31″E
- Country: Italy
- Region: Piedmont
- Province: Asti (AT)
- Frazioni: Barcara, Bonina, Calcini, Maddalena, Platona, Rossi

Government
  - Mayor: Roberta Volpato

Area
  - Total: 13.15 km^{2} (5.08 sq mi)
- Elevation: 150 m (490 ft)

Population (31 July 2010)
  - Total: 1,667
  - Density: 126.8/km^{2} (328.3/sq mi)
- Demonym: Refrancoresi
- Time zone: UTC+1 (CET)
  - Summer (DST): UTC+2 (CEST)
- Postal code: 14030
- Dialing code: 0141
- Patron saint: St. Denis
- Saint day: 18 September
- Website: Official website

Refrancore (Piedmontese: Ël Francó or Arfrancor) is a village and comune in the northwestern Italian province of Asti in the Piedmont region, located some 13 kilometres (8 mi) east of Asti in the Basso Monferrato. The territory of the comune extends over an area of 13.15 square kilometres (5.08 mi^{2}) and is largely devoted to agriculture, in particular to vineyards growing the Grignolino and Barbera wine grapes.

Although having only around 1,600 official residents, the population and activity within the village is enhanced by the presence of holiday homes and surrounding hamlets which officially lie within other village boundaries.

== History and main sights ==
The name Refrancore derives from a battle fought between the Franks and Lombards. The battle was won by the Lombards and the blood spilt by the Franks tinted a local stream red giving the area the Latin name Rivus ex sanguine Francorum which literally means “A stream full of the Franks’ blood”. This became abbreviated to Rivusfrancorum and eventually Refrancore.

At one time there was a small castle on the hill above the village, a drawing of which appears in the Codex Astensis. The last remains of the castle were razed in the 19th century in preparation for the construction of a church which was never actually built.

On the hill near the site of the Castle there is a 15th-century ricetto fort which has remained almost entirely intact. Presently it is used as a kindergarten and old people's home. The chapel which was part of the fort has been restored.

In the main square there is a clock tower which is all that remains of the 18th-century parish church which was demolished at the start of the 20th century.
