= Montemiletto =

- Comune
- Comune di Montemiletto
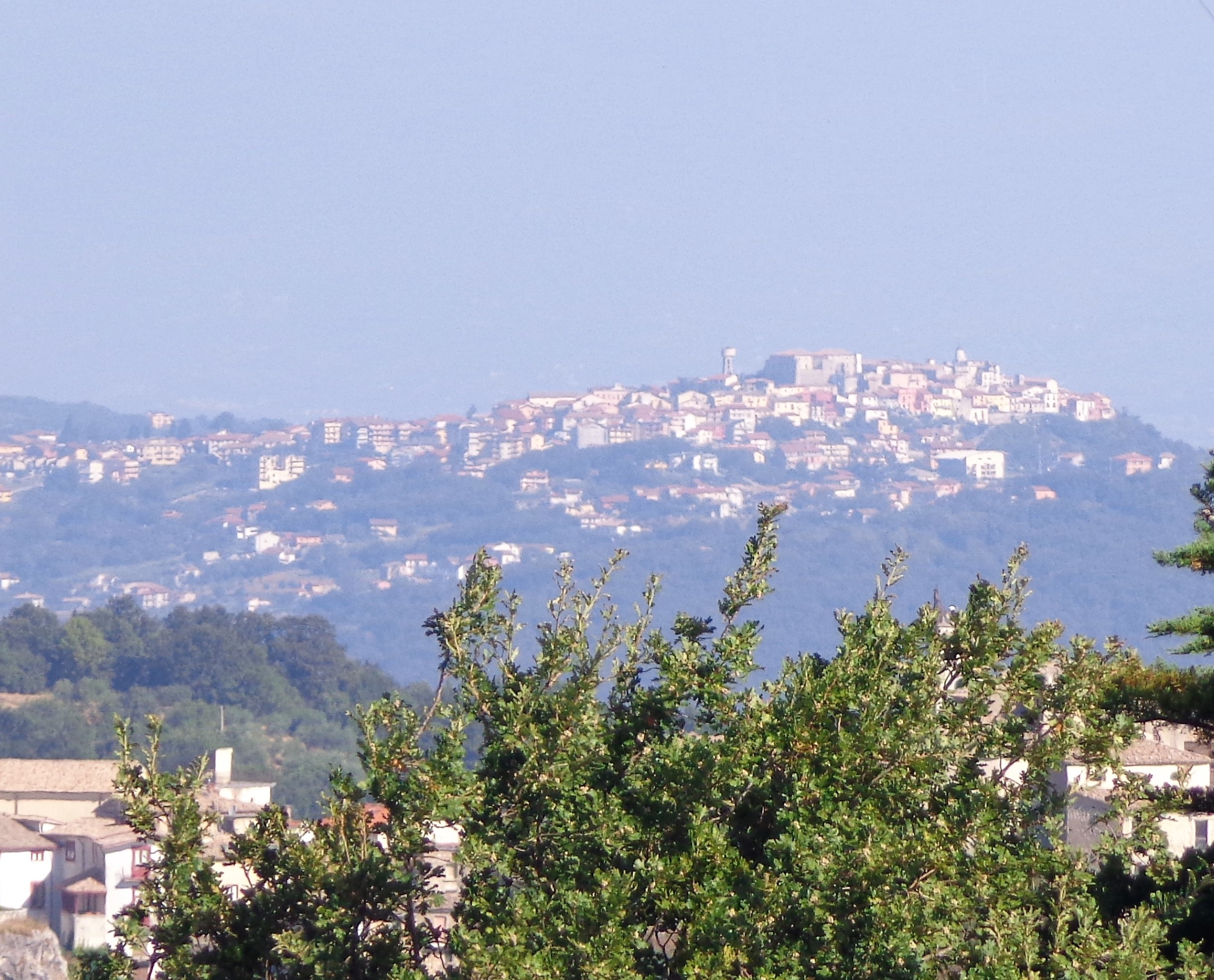

- Coat of arms

- Location within Italy Location within Campania
- Coordinates: 41°1′N 14°54′E
- Country: Italy
- Region: Campania
- Province: Avellino (AV)
- Frazioni: Caponi, Festola, Lomba, Montaperto, San Bartolomeo, San Giovanni, San Nicola, Sant'Angelo, Serra, Stazione di Montemiletto

Government
  - Mayor: Eugenio Abate

Area
  - Total: 21 km^{2} (8.1 sq mi)
- Elevation: 600 m (2,000 ft)

Population (1 May 2009)
  - Total: 5,440
  - Density: 260/km^{2} (670/sq mi)
- Demonym: Montemilettesi
- Time zone: UTC+1 (CET)
  - Summer (DST): UTC+2 (CEST)
- Postal code: 83038
- Dialing code: 0825
- ISTAT code: 064059
- Patron saint: St. Cajetan, St. Eustace
- Website: Official website

Montemiletto (Latin: Mons Militum; Irpino: Mundemelétte) is a town and comune in the province of Avellino, Campania, Italy.

The population of Montemiletto is roughly 5,400.

== See also ==
- Irpinia
- Revolt of Montefalcione
