= Tocco =

Tocco may refer to:

== Technology ==
- Samsung Tocco, a touch screen mobile phone
- Samsung Tocco Lite, a feature phone

== Geography ==
- Tocco Caudio, Italian municipality of the Province of Benevento, Campania
- Tocco da Casauria, Italian municipality of the Province of Pescara, Abruzzo

== People ==
- Tocco family, Italian noble family
  - Carlo I Tocco (d. 1429)
  - Carlo II Tocco (d. 1448)
  - Guglielmo Tocco (d. 1335)
  - Leonardo I Tocco (d. 1375 or 1377)
  - Leonardo II Tocco (d. 1418/19)
  - Leonardo III Tocco (d. 1499)
  - Theodora Tocco (d. 1429)
- Albert Tocco (1929–2005), Italian-American mobster
- Jack Tocco (1927-2014), Italian-American mobster
- James Tocco (b. 1943), American pianist
- Jim Tocco (b. 1976), American baseball announcer
- William Tocco (1897-1972), Italian-American mobster
