= Rogoi =

Medieval fortress near Arta, Greece

- Ῥωγοί
- Nea Kerasounta, Western Greece
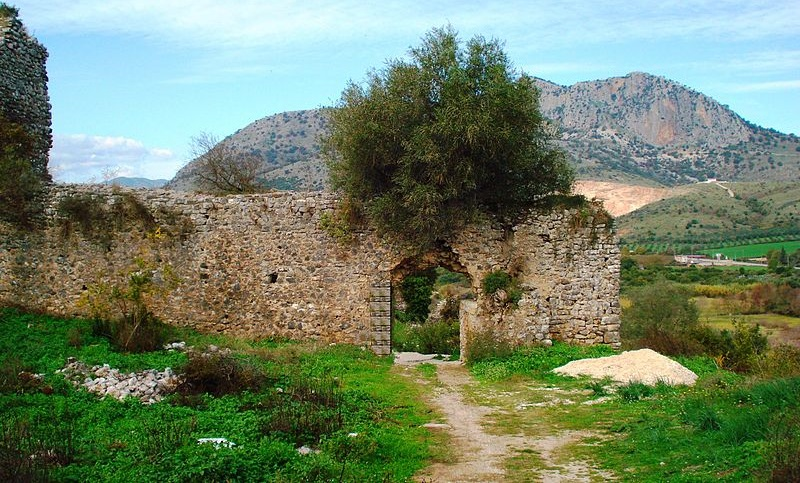
- Gate in the citadel wall of Rogoi (2010)

Site information
- Type: hilltop citadel
- Owner: Greek Ministry of Culture
- Controlled by: Byzantine Empire 9th century–1204; Despotate of Epirus 1204–1337; Byzantine Empire 1337-1345; Serbian Empire 1345–1367; Despotate of Arta 1367–1416; Tocco dynasty 1416–1449; Ottoman Empire 1449–1912
- Open to the public: Yes
- Condition: ruin

Location
- Coordinates: 39°09′22″N 20°50′53″E

Site history
- Built by: Byzantine Empire
- In use: 9th-15 century CE
- Materials: hewn stone (ashlar)
- Battles/wars: Philip I siege (1303/4)

Rogoi (Greek: Ρωγοί) is a Byzantine castle in Nea Kerasounta near Preveza, in western Greece. It is located on the site of the ancient city of Bouchetion (Βουχέτιον), which was abandoned in the late 1st century BC. Re-occupied in the 9th century, it became a bishopric and was refortified, playing an important role in the region's history in the 14th and early 15th centuries. It was abandoned again after the Ottoman conquest in 1449.

== Location ==
The castle is located west of the village of Nea Kerasounta, on a 29 m tall hill on the northern bank of the Louros river, which surrounds the base of the hill on the eastern, southern and western sides. The castle was built on the location of the acropolis of the ancient city of Bouchetion. Despite its inland location today, in Antiquity the hill seems to have been an island, and literary references confirm that Rogoi remained a coastal location in the Middle Ages as well, with the Ambracian Gulf extending further to the northwest than it does today.

== History ==
The site was identified by 19th-century scholars with ancient Charadrus, until N. G. L. Hammond established its modern identification with the ancient city of Bouchetion. Bouchetion was an Elean colony founded in the 7th century BC, and served as the port for the inland settlements of Elatria (at the modern village of Palaioroforos, 10 km west of Rogoi) and Baties (modern Kastro Rizovouni, some 7 km to the north of Rogoi). In the 4th century, Bouchetion was incorporated into the unified kingdom of Epirus by the Molossian king Alexander I (r. 350–331 BC). The town followed the fortunes of the Epirote state. In 167 BC, it was sacked during the Third Macedonian War. Although its strategic location ensured that the site remained occupied thereafter, it was eventually abandoned after the foundation of Nicopolis in 28 BC.

The new settlement of Rogoi is first attested in the Notitiae Episcopatuum of the Patriarchate of Constantinople as the seat of a bishopric, a suffragan of the Metropolis of Naupaktos, under the Byzantine emperor Leo VI (r. 886–912). It was likely resettled in the course of the 9th century, during the Byzantines' recovery of Epirus from the Slavic invaders who had taken it over in the late 6th and early 7th century. Indeed, the name "Rogoi" has been suggested as being of Slavic origin, but more likely derives from a Sicilian Greek term for "granaries", and may indicate that Sicilian settlers were brought in to establish the new settlement.

In the period between c. 1000 and c. 1500, the local inhabitants changed the course of the Louros river to its present form, aiming to drain its marshes and increase the available farmland, and possibly to enhance the protection of the castle itself, which was now surrounded on three sides by the river.

The medieval settlement appears in historical sources chiefly in the 14th–15th centuries, when it played a role in the wars of various local potentates for control over Epirus. Thus it was attacked without success by Philip I, Prince of Taranto in 1303/4, when Anna Palaiologina Kantakouzene, the regent of the Despotate of Epirus, refused to acknowledge Angevin suzerainty. In 1338/9, the castle of Rogoi, along with the Epirote capital, Arta, and the fortress of Riniasa or Thomokastron, was seized by Epirote rebels under Alexios Kabasilas, who rose up against the annexation of Epirus into the Byzantine Empire in the previous year. Emperor Andronikos III Palaiologos and his Grand Domestic, John Kantakouzenos, blockaded Rogoi, which was eventually persuaded to surrender by Kantakouzenos. Epirus fell into the hands of the Serbian Empire during the Byzantine civil war of 1341–47.

In 1361, the Serbian emperor Simeon Urosh confirmed John Tzaphas Orsini, a relative of his wife, as lord of Rogoi and other areas in Epirus, but the actual effect of this proclamation was probably negligible, as Serbian rule was soon challenged by the attacks of Albanian tribes. By 1367, Rogoi and Arta were in the hands of the Albanian chieftain Pjetër Losha. After Losha's death in 1374, his domain was taken over by the fellow Albanian ruler of the Acheloos River area, Gjin Bua Shpata. The town remained in the hands of the Shpata family until 1416, when the last Albanian ruler, Yaqub Shpata, was defeated by the Count palatine of Cephalonia and Zakynthos, Carlo I Tocco, who in 1411 had become master of Ioannina. Carlo and his brother, Leonardo II Tocco, took possession of Arta and Rogoi, thereby restoring the Despotate of Epirus to its traditional boundaries. Rogoi was finally abandoned after the Ottoman conquest of the region in 1449.

Ciriaco de' Pizzicolli visited the castle in 1436 and 1448, and recorded that the relics of Saint Luke were kept in a church there; according to contemporary Serbian texts, these had been moved there from Constantinople after the fall of the city to the Fourth Crusade.

In 2019, the title of Bishop of Rogoi was revived and given to Filotheos Theodoropoulos, when he was elected as assistant bishop of the Archbishopric of Athens.

== Castle layout ==
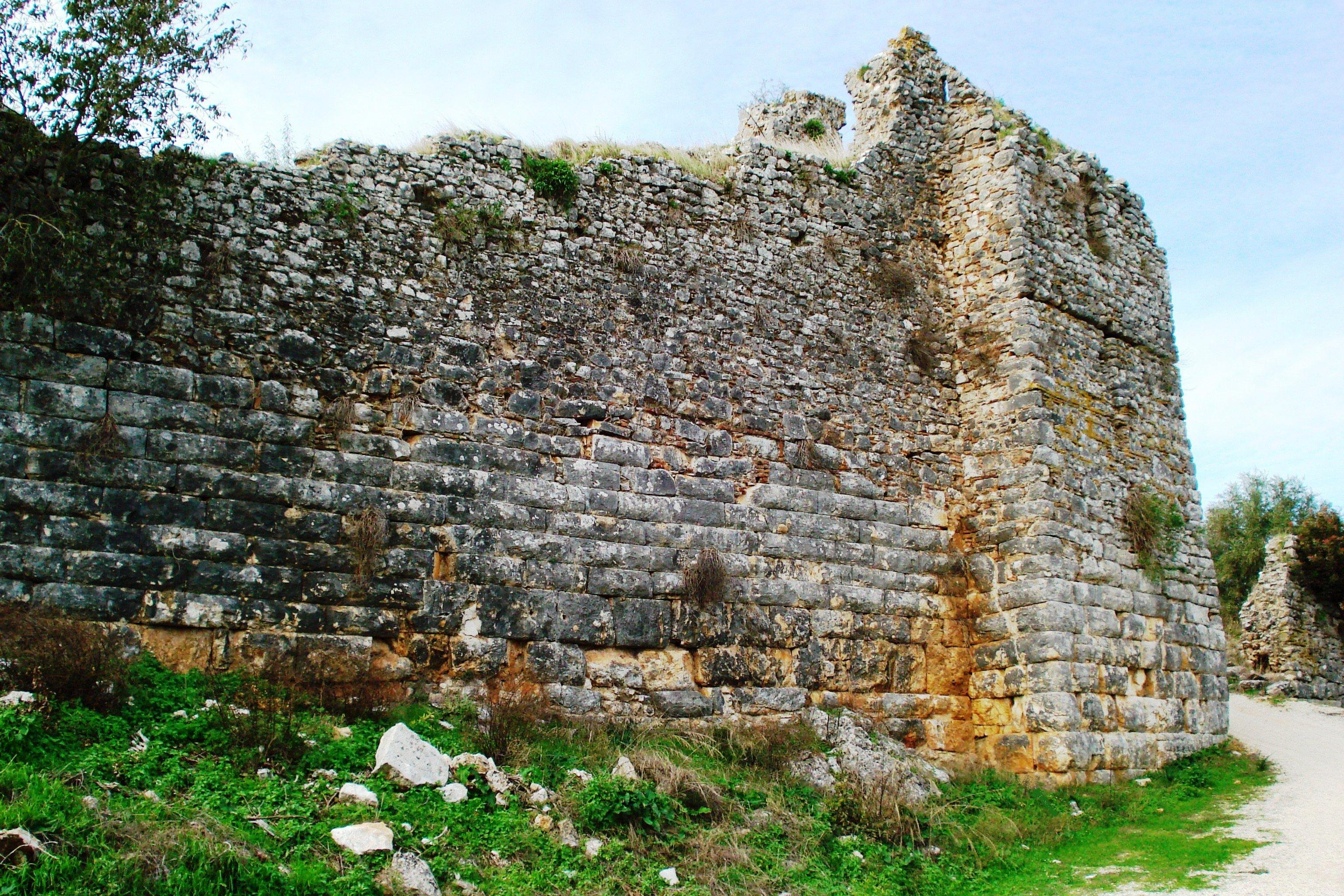
Wall of the castle, showing the clear difference between the masonry of the ancient foundations and the later medieval reconstruction

For the first two centuries of its existence, Bouchetion was apparently unfortified, and the first fortification on the site consisted of a simple circuit wall of 450 m length enclosing the flat space on the top of the hill. This was later enlarged by an irregular wall enclosing the entire northern slope of the hill, increasing the length of the outer walls to 730 m and doubling the enclosed area from 9,000 to 18,000 m^{2}. Still later the walls were again expanded to include the northeastern part of the settlement, so that in its final extent the ancient fortifications formed an outer circuit of 1,000 m and encompassed an area of 37,000 m^{2}.

The medieval castle extant today was built on the remains of the first two phases of the ancient acropolis, and follows the course of the ancient fortifications, incorporating their foundations. The medieval outer circuit wall was largely built on the traces of the ancient walls, with the different styles of masonry making the two structures clearly discernible from each other. To these were added internal transverse walls, reinforced by towers, dividing the enclosed space into three baileys. The outer bailey also contained a monastery, of which only the 15th-century church of the Assumption remains. The castle's interior is now mostly ruined and overgrown with vegetation. The date of the Byzantine re-fortification is uncertain, possibly from as early as the site's re-occupation in the 9th century to the 13th/14th centuries.

The site has not yet been excavated, except for maintenance work on the walls undertaken in the 1978–80 period.

== Sources ==
- Brooks, Allan (2013). Castles of Northwest Greece: From the Early Byzantine Period to the Eve of the First World War. Aetos Press. ISBN 978-0-9575846-0-0.
- Soustal, Peter; Koder, Johannes (1981). Tabula Imperii Byzantini, Band 3: Nikopolis und Kephallēnia (in German). Vienna: Verlag der Österreichischen Akademie der Wissenschaften. ISBN 978-3-7001-0399-8.
- Veikou, Myrto (2012). Byzantine Epirus: A Topography of Transformation. Settlements of the Seventh-Twelfth Centuries in Southern Epirus and Aetoloacarnania, Greece. BRILL. ISBN 978-9004221512.
