= Leonardo III Tocco =

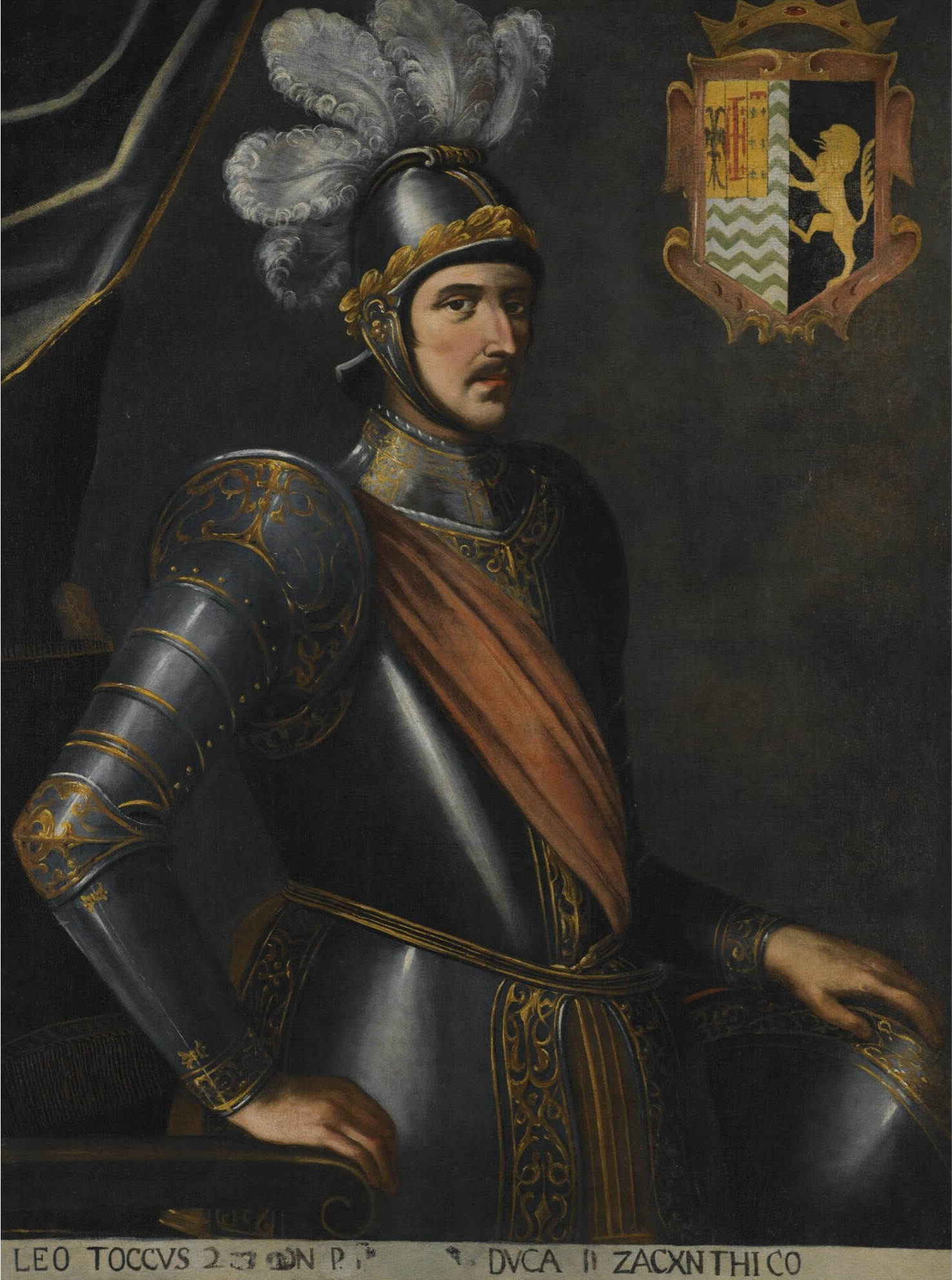
- 17th century portrait of Leonardo III Tocco, by Carlo Sellitto

Despot of Epirus Count Palatine of Cephalonia and Zakynthos
- Reign: 30 September 1448 – September 1479 (claimed in exile until c. 1503)
- Predecessor: Carlo II Tocco
- Successor: Carlo III Tocco (titular)
- Born: After 1436 (Note: Leonardo's precise years of birth and death are not known. Given that his parents were married in 1436, he must have been born after that year. He died at some point during the pontificate of Pope Alexander VI, who died in August 1503, meaning that Leonardo had to have died before that point.)
- Died: Before August 1503; Rome
- Spouse: Milica Branković; Francesca Marzano
- Issue more...: Carlo III Tocco
- Dynasty: Tocco
- Father: Carlo II Tocco
- Mother: Raimondina Ventimiglia

Leonardo III Tocco (Greek: Λεονάρδος Κατακουζηνᾶτος δὲ Τόκκω, romanized: Leonardos Katakouzenatos de Tokko; after 1436 – before August 1503) was the last ruler of the Despotate of Epirus, ruling from the death of his father Carlo II Tocco in 1448 to the despotate's fall to the Ottoman Empire in 1479. Leonardo was one of the last independent Latin rulers in Greece and the last to hold territories on the Greek mainland. After the fall of his realm, Leonardo fled to Italy and became a landowner and diplomat. He continued to claim his titles in exile until his death.

Leonardo inherited numerous possessions on the western Greek mainland from his father. Most of these mainland territories, including the capital of Arta, were conquered by the Ottomans in 1449, the first year of Leonardo's reign. Leonardo had inherited the throne while still underage and his government was initially headed by a four-person regency council for several years. Upon becoming old enough to rule for himself, Leonardo had all of his former regents murdered. Leonardo engaged in several anti-Ottoman activities, such as working on the side of the Republic of Venice in the First Ottoman–Venetian War (1463–1479). Despite this, his realm was left in peace throughout most of his reign and became one of the most prosperous regions in Greece.

Although energetic and wise, Leonardo was not very successful. He engaged in several efforts to gain the support of the many Greeks who lived under his rule, such as restoring Greek Orthodox religious sees, allowing Greeks a certain degree of autonomous self-governance, and issuing Greek-language charters. These efforts do not appear to have had an effect on most of the populace. In 1477, Leonardo married a Neapolitan noblewoman in an attempt to gain support from the Kingdom of Naples. This move backfired catastrophically; the Republic of Venice, which acted as Leonardo's main protection against the Ottomans, opposed Neapolitan influence in Greece and ceased to support Leonardo. The end of Venetian protection paved the way for the 1479 Ottoman invasion that ended Leonardo's rule.

Viewing opposition to the Ottomans as futile, Leonardo escaped into exile. Although he spent the rest of his life pondering ways to regain his lands, Leonardo never returned to Greece. In Italy, he attempted to increase his status by acquiring various fiefs. This was an unsuccessful venture that resulted in Leonardo ending up in considerable debt and losing all the lands he had acquired. Leonardo died in Rome at some point in the pontificate of Pope Alexander VI (r. 1492–1503), crushed as his house collapsed on top of him. Leonardo's titular claims were inherited by his eldest son, Carlo III Tocco.

== Background ==
Map of the lands and conquests of Leonardo's grand-uncle Carlo I Tocco

The Despotate of Epirus was one of the Byzantine successor states founded in 1204/1205 in the aftermath of the Fourth Crusade, which saw the collapse of the Byzantine Empire and the creation of the Latin Empire by the crusaders in its place. The despotate had originally been ruled by the Byzantine Komnenos Doukas family, a branch of the Angelos dynasty which had ruled Byzantium from 1185 to 1204, but fell into the hands of the Italian Orsini family in 1318 through inheritance and scheming, before the despotate was conquered and destroyed by the Serbian Empire in the 1340s.

Though various local rulers would claim the title of 'despot' thereafter, the despotate was not restored to something close to its original form until the early 15th century, when the Italian noble Carlo I Tocco worked to expand his holdings through conquest. Carlo I was the son of Leonardo I Tocco, who had been granted the title of Count Palatine of Cephalonia and Zakynthos by the Kingdom of Naples. Carlo I's uncle, Esau de' Buondelmonti, who ruled the town Ioannina as despot, died in 1411. The town was then held by his wife, Jevdokija Balšić, but on account of her unpopularity she was deposed by the locals, who appealed to Carlo I to become their ruler instead. Only two months after Esau's death, Carlo I made a triumphal entry into Ioannina. He almost immediately assumed the title of despot, though the locals insisted that Carlo seek recognition of that title from the Byzantine emperor. After having received Carlo I's brother Leonardo II Tocco as an emissary, Emperor Manuel II Palaiologos (r. 1391–1425) formally recognized Carlo I as a despot in 1415. Carlo I saw his title of despot as granting him a claim on the lands formerly ruled by the Komnenos Doukas and Orsini dynasties of the Despotate of Epirus. In 1416, he captured Arta, the old capital of the despotate.

Leonardo III Tocco was the eldest son and heir of Carlo II Tocco, the nephew and successor of Carlo I. Leonardo's mother was Raimondina Ventimiglia, a daughter of the Italian baron Giovanni Ventimiglia.

== Biography ==
=== Accession and early reign ===
Leonardo was still underage when his father died on 30 September 1448. Without a strong leader, the four governors whom Carlo II had appointed to form the regency council for his son (Jacobus Rosso, Andreas de Guido de Strione, Gaeatius de Santa Columba and Marinus Miliares) looked across the Adriatic Sea for aid in defending the Tocco lands from the Ottomans. Some looked to the Republic of Venice for aid, one governor even offering to sell his island to the Venetians, whereas others looked to Alfonso V of Naples due to former connections between the Tocchi and the Neapolitan crown. Though Venice entered into negotiations to send aid, the Ottomans struck before an agreement could be concluded. The capital of the despotate, Arta, fell to the Ottomans on 24 March 1449, whereafter all of Leonardo's mainland possessions, save for the three settlements of Vonitza, Varnazza and Angelokastro, were annexed. These lands would thereafter be called Karli-Ili (Carlo's country) by the Ottomans, in reference to Leonardo's ancestor Carlo I Tocco.

Though the fall of the mainland made the threat of further Ottoman conquest clear, neither Venice nor Naples offered much aid. Alfonso seems to have regarded Leonardo as his vassal and Venice proved unwilling to help when it became clear that Leonardo and his regens were not willing to exchange Venice's aid for ceding them Zakynthos or other parts of Leonardo's domain, nor in exchange for Venice being allowed to govern the islands during his minority. Nevertheless, Leonardo eventually succeeded in securing protection by Venice, and in doing so became an honorary citizen of the republic. In times when Leonardo's realm was truly threatened, Venice did expend resources in ensuring his safety, such as in 1463, when numerous incidents with Ottoman ships near Leonardo's islands resulted in Venice sending ships to observe the situation, demonstrate power, and protect the local population. Venetian protection was however also often only nominal, with many of Leonardo's appeals for aid being rejected.

=== Staving off Ottoman conquest ===
After the fall of Arta, Leonardo's domain enjoyed several years of peace, with even the scant possessions on the mainland being free from Ottoman incursions. Why the Ottomans left Leonardo alone is unknown. Contemporary records explained this through 'God's will', though it is more likely due to the Ottomans' preoccupation with the conquest of other Balkan realms during this period. Though not a powerful ruler by any means, Leonardo worked to resist the rise of the Ottoman Empire. In a move which historian William Miller described in 1908 as either excessively "patriotic" or "impolitic", Leonardo joined the Albanian lord Skanderbeg in throwing off Ottoman suzerainty in 1460. The results were catastrophic, as Leonardo lost two out of his three fortresses on the mainland, only retaining Vonitza, and, according to one account, resulting in his imprisonment in Corinth, from which he supposedly undertook a daring escape with the aid of a corsair. Despite having lost control of virtually the entire mainland, Leonardo still had the support of the Latin populace of his former lands, and actively sought to regain them. In 1463, he heard that Venice was preparing an expedition to conquer the Morea, which had been a Byzantine rump state until its fall to the Ottomans in 1460. Upon learning this, Leonardo appealed to Venice to aid him in retaking his mainland possessions, though that scheme eventually amounted to nothing.

By the time of the First Ottoman–Venetian War (1463–1479), Leonardo was one of the last independent Latin rulers in Greece. The drawn-out process of Ottoman conquest in Greece and the rest of the Balkans, as well as the ongoing fighting, had made Leonardo's island realm the refuge of thousands of Christian refugees, who were allowed to live in their own somewhat autonomous communities. Leonardo also participated in the ongoing war to an extent, acting as an intermediary between Venice and the Ottomans and sending occasional military aid to the Venetian forces. The enthusiastic reception of refugees and lack of attention from the Ottomans ensured that even while the mainland was devastated by war, Leonardo's islands flourished in peace. When the Byzantine historian George Sphrantzes visited the islands during this time he found them enjoying the period of peace, with Leonardo having become lord in his own right after having put his four regents to death. The 16th-century Spanish historian Jerónimo Zurita y Castro, who visited Leonardo's former islands some decades after the fall of the despotate, noted that the prosperity of the islands entitled Leonardo to rightfully be called a king, rather than a mere despot or count palatine. Zurita's account of Leonardo as an independent and prosperous ruler, which is corroborated in parts by some other contemporary records, led to many scholars characterizing Leonardo's entire reign as one of prosperity and peace, but this is far from a nuanced picture, given that other records testify to the period being a catastrophe that ended in Ottoman conquest. Though much of the surviving evidence does point to Leonardo being a wise and energetic ruler, his realm was plagued by exterior threats in the form of the Ottomans and Venice, as well as internal problems, and proved unable to avoid the Ottoman onslaught, a fate no Balkan ruler in the 15th century could escape.

During Leonardo's reign, the administration of his islands had been efficiently organized. He had several treasurers, as well as financial officers termed 'procurators'. Civil and judicial administration was headed by vice-regents, or captains, with one appointed for each island. Though Leonardo offered considerably support for the local Catholic church, established since the islands came under the rule of the Italian Orsini family more than a century earlier, he was also careful not to neglect the Orthodox church, as he inferred that if he mistreated the local Greeks, they could conspire with the Ottomans to depose him. In 1452, Leonardo revived the Orthodox Bishopric of Cephalonia, an ancient see that had been rendered vacant after the Orsini takeover, appointing a new Orthodox bishop with jurisdiction over the islands of Zakynthos and Ithaca. Leonardo also began employing a larger number of Greeks in his administration and began issuing charters in Greek. Though Leonardo thus gave several concessions to the Greeks, he was, despite his hopes, nevertheless seen as a tyrant by many of his Orthodox subjects. Leonardo suffered from some problems owing to internal dissent, notably an incident in 1468 when some people from Corfu plundered and raped around a town on Zakynthos, as well as problems caused by natural forces, such as a series of strong earthquakes in 1469, which caused collapsed houses and deaths on all of the islands under his control.

=== Fall of the despotate ===
Leonardo's first wife, whom he had married on 1 May 1463, was Milica Branković, a granddaughter of Thomas Palaiologos, the brother of the final Byzantine emperor Constantine XI Palaiologos. After her death in 1464, Leonardo sought to remarry in order to seal a political alliance, in hopes of saving what remained of his realm. He thus married Francesca Marzano in 1477, a niece of Ferdinand I of Naples. The effect of Leonardo's marriage was the opposite of what he had wanted. Given that the Republic of Venice had no desire to see Neapolitan influence return to Leonardo's islands, the marriage alienated them further. Venetian revenge came in the form of Venice omitting Leonardo from their 1479 peace treaty with the Ottomans, effectively leaving him as the sole remaining belligerent against Sultan Mehmed II. The unfavorable peace deal Leonardo managed to secure with the Ottomans resulted in him having to not only pay 4,000 ducats annually in tribute but also in Leonardo agreeing to gift 500 ducats to any visiting Ottoman provincial governor.

Unfortunately for Leonardo, an Ottoman official visited him shortly after the peace deal was signed. Given that this official was still underage and had recently lost the dignity of pasha, Leonardo gifted him with a selection of fruit rather than 500 ducats. Angered by this lackluster gift, the young official reached out to the sultan, reminding Mehmed of Leonardo having been left out of the greater Venetian peace deal and Leonardo's pro-Venetian stance during the war. Eager for a pretext to invade Leonardo's domain, from which Mehmed eventually hoped to launch an invasion of Italy, the sultan sent a fleet of 29 ships commanded by Gedik Ahmed Pasha, a former grand vizier, to conquer the islands. Knowing that the Venetians were not going to help him, and that Naples would be unable to, as well as the fact that many of his own non-Latin subjects detested him, Leonardo concluded that fighting against the Ottomans was futile. Thus, the despot collected his valuables and fled from the island of Lefkada, where he had ruled from, to the fortress of St. George on the island of Cephalonia, the strongest of the fortresses under his control.

Leonardo began to mistrust the garrison of St. George. When the Ottomans arrived and spotted his treasure-ship, Leonardo decided to flee, hastily boarding a Venetian ship, alongside his wife, his son Carlo, and his brothers Giovanni and Antonio, headed to Taranto in southern Italy One-by-one, Leonardo's few remaining possessions quickly fell to the Ottomans in August and September 1479, with officials being killed, castles being burned and many people of the lower classes being carried off.

=== Life in exile ===
Italy was the obvious choice for refuge, given that it was the nearest Christian land and the ancestral homeland of Leonardo's family. Leonardo was also well-connected to the Italian nobility and could thus expect a welcome reception. Not only was Leonard the nephew-in-law of the Neapolitan king, Leonardo's sister-in-law was also married to Pope Sixtus IV's nephew. Leonardo and his family were met with a friendly reception by Ferdinand of Naples upon their arrival. Leonardo's uncle-in-law granted him an annual pension of 500 florins, and also made him a landed noble, granting him the fiefs of Briatico and Calimera in Calabria. These lands were a small gesture, given that Leonardo had expected Ferdinand to lend him military aid to retake his lands in Greece.

On 29 February 1480, Leonardo and his family arrived in Rome, seeking money from Pope Sixtus. Papal emissaries met with Leonardo outside the Porta San Giovanni and escorted him to a house he had leased between the Botteghe Oscure and the Via Pellicciaria. Sixtus IV gave Leonardo 1000 gold pieces, and promised a pension of 2000 gold pieces a year. Sixtus recorded his generosity to Leonardo in reliefs in the frescoes of the Ospedale di Santo Spirito in Sassia, which record how Sixtus "nourished [Leonardo] with his royal bounty". Leonardo's attempts at gaining money from the Papacy may be explained by his facing large debts, since the lands granted to him by Ferdinand were not enough to sustain himself, his family, and his entourage. By October 1480, Leonardo owed Ferdinand 12,000 ducats, and owed his own wife 600 ducats. After having stayed in Rome for about a month, Leonardo left to reside in southern Italy again.

Leonardo and his family hoped to regain their territories in Greece. Leonardo's brother Antonio briefly succeeded, with the aid of some Catalan mercenaries, to recover the islands of Cephalonia and Zakynthos in 1481. Venice did not wish for the islands to fall under Neapolitan suzerainty again, so worked to dislodge Antonio. In 1482, the Venetian governor of Methoni successfully took control of Zakynthos and in 1483, Antonio was killed by his own garrison due to fears of an imminent Venetian attack. Although the Ottomans demanded the return of the islands and Leonardo petitioned Venice to be reinstated as ruler, Venice succeeded in retaining the islands until the fall of the republic in the late 18th century (though Cephalonia came under Ottoman control briefly in 1485–1500). Though Leonardo would spend the rest of his life pondering how he could regain his lands, no further attempts were ever made to take them back.

Leonardo served Ferdinand as a diplomat to Spain. The Spaniards are recorded as having treated Leonardo with royal honors, echoing Zurita's assessment of him as deserving of royal status. Leonardo also worked to enhance his wealth and power in southern Italy further, but it proved to be a mostly fruitless venture. In 1480, he purchased the town of Sinopoli for 20,000 ducats, but he was unable to govern it. By 1496, many of the fiefs Leonard had amassed are attested as being ruled by other people, meaning that he had lost them through some means. In 1495, Leonardo was granted the Apulian town of Monopoli by Charles VIII of France, who had invaded and taken control of Naples. Leonardo eventually returned to Rome, dying there in the pontificate of Pope Alexander VI (r. 1492–1503), when his house collapsed on top of him.

== Family ==
Leonardo III Tocco's relation to the rulers of Epirus

Guglielmo Tocco	Margaret Orsini	John II Orsini
Esau de' Buondelmonti	Maddalena de' Buondelmonti	Leonardo I Tocco
Leonardo II Tocco
Carlo II Tocco	Raimondina Ventimiglia
Leonardo III Tocco

With Milica Branković, Leonardo only had a single child, his eldest son:

- Carlo III Tocco (1464–1518), who succeeded Leonardo as titular Despot of Epirus and Count Palatine of Cephalonia and Zakynthos. Noted for his military service under Holy Roman Emperor Maximilian I (r. 1508–1519).

With Francesca Marzano, Leonardo had five more children; two sons and three daughters:

- Ferdinando or Ferrante Tocco (after 1480 – 23 December 1525), son who also served under Maximilian I, later becoming a soldier and diplomat in service to Spain, for instance being attested at the court of Henry VII of England in 1506.
- Raimondina, Raimonda or Ramusia Tocco (after 1480 – after 1519), daughter who lived in Venice and later Rome. Married Antonio Maria Pico della Mirandola, an Italian noble.
- Eleonora Tocco (after 1480 – ?), daughter who lived in Venice and became a nun.
- Pietro Tocco (after 1480 – ?), son who died in infancy.
- Ippolita Tocco (after 1480 – ?), daughter who lived in Venice and then Rome.

Leonardo also had at least one illegitimate son, whose name is not recorded, born c. 1458 and dead at some point after 1481.

== Notes ==
Leonardo III Tocco Tocco dynasty Born: c. 1436 Died: c. 1503
Regnal titles
Preceded by Carlo II Tocco	Despot of Epirus; Count Palatine of Cephalonia and Zakynthos; 1448–1479	Vacant Ottoman conquest Title next held by Carlo III Tocco as pretender
