= Battle of the Echinades (1427) =

Fought between the Byzantines and the fleet of Carlo I Tocco

Coordinates: 38°22′00″N 21°04′00″E

- Part of the Byzantine-Latin Wars
- Map of the Peloponnese (Morea) in the late Middle Ages. The Echinades islands are in the upper left corner, between Ithaca and the Greek mainland.
Date	1427
Location	Echinades, Greece
Result	Byzantine victory

Belligerents
Byzantine Empire	Carlo I Tocco

Commanders and leaders
Demetrios Laskaris Leontares	Torno

Casualties and losses
Unknown	Many dead, several ships and over 150 men captured

The Battle of the Echinades was fought in 1427 among the Echinades islands off western Greece between the fleets of Carlo I Tocco and the Byzantine Empire. The battle was a decisive Byzantine victory, the last in the Empire's naval history, and led to the consolidation of the Peloponnese under the Byzantine Despotate of the Morea.

== Background ==
In the early 15th century, the Peloponnese peninsula was divided between three powers: the Latin Principality of Achaea in the north and west, the Byzantine Greek Despotate of the Morea in the south and east, and Argos and Nauplia, Coron and Modon and some attendant forts, held by the Republic of Venice. The Byzantines were actively trying to conquer the ailing principality, all the while the menace of the ever-expanding Ottoman Empire threatened all of them. Carlo I Tocco, the ruler of the County palatine of Cephalonia and Zakynthos, of Lefkada and of the Despotate of Epirus, took advantage of the Byzantine-Achaean struggles to extend his domains into the Peloponnese: in 1407–1408 his brother Leonardo seized and plundered the fortress of Glarentza, in the northwestern Peloponnese, and in 1421 Carlo bought permanent possession of it from Oliverio Franco, who had seized it from the Achaean prince Centurione II Zaccaria three years earlier.

In February 1423, a shaky truce was brokered between Zaccaria, Tocco, and the Byzantines by the Venetians, who were eager to establish a common front against the Ottomans, but this did not prevent a major Ottoman raid into the peninsula by Turahan Bey in summer 1423, nor did it stop the aggressive Byzantine despot, Theodore II Palaiologos, from raiding Venetian territory and even capturing Centurione Zaccaria in June 1424. The Byzantines initially seemed content to leave Tocco alone, as he too had open scores with Zaccaria, but war between the two powers was provoked in late 1426, when Tocco's forces seized the animals of Albanian herders during the latter's annual migration from the Byzantine-controlled central uplands to the plain of Elis.

== Battle and aftermath ==
The Byzantine emperor, John VIII Palaiologos, personally travelled to the Peloponnese, and the Byzantine forces laid siege to Glarentza by land and sea. Tocco assembled a fleet from his domains in the Ionian Islands and Epirus, augmented by ships from Marseille, and placed it under the command of his illegitimate son, Torno. The Byzantine fleet, under a certain Leontarios (probably Demetrios Laskaris Leontares), met the Latin fleet at the Echinades and dealt it a crushing blow: most of Tocco's ships were captured, many of the crews were killed and over 150 men were taken prisoner. Torno himself was barely able to escape, but one of his nephews was captured. The victory was recorded in a lengthy anonymous panegyric to Manuel II Palaiologos and his son John VIII, which is also the main source of information about the battle.

This defeat ended Tocco's ambitions in the Peloponnese: in a negotiated settlement, John VIII's brother Constantine Palaiologos (later last Byzantine emperor as Constantine XI) married Maddalena Tocco, Carlo's niece, and received the Tocco family's Peloponnesian domains as her dowry. Based in Tocco's former domains, and under Constantine's leadership, the Byzantines went on to reduce the last remnants of the Achaean principality. Patras fell in May 1430, and by 1432, Constantine and his brothers had deposed the last Latin feudatories and restored the entire peninsula, with the exception of the Venetian possessions, to Byzantine control.

== Sources ==
- Lampros, Spyridon P. (1926). Παλαιολόγεια και Πελοποννησιακά, Τόμος Γ′ (in Greek). Athens, Greece: Vas. N. Grigoriadis.
- Miller, William (1908). The Latins in the Levant: A History of Frankish Greece (1204–1566). London: John Murray.
- Nicol, Donald M. (1984). The Despotate of Epiros, 1267–1479: A Contribution to the History of Greece in the Middle Ages. Cambridge: Cambridge University Press. ISBN 978-0-521-13089-9.
- Setton, Kenneth M. (1978). The Papacy and the Levant (1204–1571), Volume II: The Fifteenth Century. Vol. 2. Philadelphia: The American Philosophical Society. ISBN 0-87169-127-2.
