= Maria Komnene Doukaina =

- Countess Palatine of Cephalonia and Zakynthos
- Predecessor: Margaret of Villehardouin
- Successor: Anna Palaiologina
- Spouse: John I Orsini
- Issue: Nicholas Orsini; John II Orsini; Guy Orsini; Margaret Orsini
- House: Komnenodoukas
- Father: Nikephoros I Komnenos Doukas
- Mother: Maria Laskaris Vatatzaina
- Religion: Orthodox Christian

Maria Komnene Doukaina (Greek: Μαρία Κομνηνή Δούκαινα) was an Epiriot princess, daughter of Nicephorus I, and countess palatine of Cephalonia and Zakynthos as wife of John I Orsini.

== Biography ==
Maria was the only child of Nicephorus I Komnenos Doukas, despot of Epirus, and his first wife, Maria Laskaris Vatatzaina, daughter of the emperor of Nicea Theodore II Laskaris.

In 1283/1284, arrangements were made to marry one of Nikephoros' daughters, Maria or her younger half-sister Thamar, to their cousin Michael, son of John I Doukas of Thessaly, but the groom was captured by the Byzantines while traveling to 'Epirus and imprisoned in Constantinople, where he died.

In 1291, Epirus was invaded by the Byzantines in retaliation for the alliance made by Nicephorus with Charles II of Anjou. To fight them, Nicephorus appealed to Charles' Latin vassals, but in exchange he had to send Mary hostage to Richard II Orsini, Count of Cephalonia and Zakynthos. A year later, Richard married Maria to his son John, without consulting Nicephorus, who was offended and forgave Richard only in 1295, when Richard agreed for Maria and John to live in Epirus. Maria left Epirus in 1303/1304, when her father-in-law was murdered and her husband became the new Count.

She died on an unknown date.

== Issue ==
From her husband, she had three sons and a daughter:

- Nicholas Orsini (1295 - 1323), Count palatine of Cephalonia and Zakynthos and despot of Epirus, he died murdered;
- John II Orsini (died in 1335), heir of his older brother;
- Guy Orsini, Constable of Principality of Achaea;
- Margaret (died in 1339), lady of one half of Zakynthos, she married Guglielmo Tocco.

== Sources ==
- Bon, Antoine (1969). La Morée franque. Recherches historiques, topographiques et archéologiques sur la principauté d'Achaïe (in French). Paris: Boccard. OCLC 869621129.
- Fine, John V. A. (1994). The late medieval Balkans: a critical survey from the late twelfth century to the Ottoman conquest (2. print ed.). Ann Arbor: Univ. of Michigan Press. ISBN 978-0-472-08260-5.
- Nicol, Donald MacGillivray (2010). The despotate of Epiros, 1267 - 1479: a contribution to the history of Greece in the middle ages. Paperback re-issue (Digitally print. version ed.). Cambridge: Cambridge Univ. Press. ISBN 978-0-521-13089-9.
- Demetrios I. Polemis, The Doukai: a contribution to Byzantine prosopography, Londra, The Athlone Press, 1968.
