= John I Orsini =

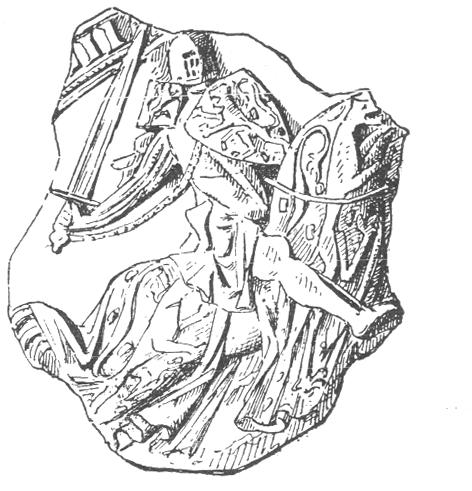
- Damaged impression of the seal of John I Orsini

Count palatine of Cephalonia and Zakynthos
- Reign: 1303/4 – 1317
- Predecessor: Richard Orsini
- Successor: Nicholas Orsini
- Spouse: Maria Komnene Doukaina
- Issue: Nicholas; John II; Guy; Margaret
- Italian: Giovanni Orsini
- Dynasty: Orsini (?)
- Father: Richard Orsini
- Religion: Roman Catholic

John I Orsini (Italian: Giovanni Orsini) was the count palatine of Cephalonia and Zakynthos from 1303 or 1304 to his death in 1317. Married to an Epirote princess, John spent a decade at the Epirote court before succeeding his father, Richard Orsini, as count palatine. As a vassal of the Principality of Achaea, he was involved in its domestic affairs and especially the dynastic dispute between the infante Ferdinand of Majorca and Princess Matilda of Hainaut in 1315–16, and participated in a number of Latin campaigns against Epirus, which he aspired to rule. A year after his death, his son and heir Nicholas Orsini seized Epirus and brought it under the Orsini family's rule.

== Life ==
John was the only son of Richard Orsini, count palatine of Cephalonia and Zakynthos, who in turn is held to have been the son (or possibly grandson) of Count Matthew Orsini, and a daughter of the sebastokrator John Komnenos Doukas, ruler of Thessalonica, born by his first unknown wife.

In 1292, he was wed to Maria, the daughter of Despot Nikephoros I Komnenos Doukas, ruler of Epirus. Maria had been sent as a hostage to Cephalonia to ensure Nikephoros' loyalty to the Latin princes when Richard and forces from the Principality of Achaea campaigned in Epirus to help raise the Byzantine siege of Ioannina. After the Byzantines were repelled, Richard, without consulting Nikephoros, arranged for John's marriage to Maria. This aroused the indignation of Nikephoros, who was not mollified until 1295, when the young couple came to live at his court. There John won his father-in-law's affection, to the extent that he granted him possession of the island of Leucas—Richard had promised to, but probably never did, cede the nearby island of Ithaca to the couple as well. John and Maria remained at the Epirote court until the accidental death of Count Richard in 1303 or 1304.

After Richard's death, John was immediately engaged in a legal battle with his stepmother, Richard's second wife Margaret of Villehardouin, over his inheritance: Margaret claimed the fief of Katochi in Epirus, as well as mobile property to the sum of 100,000 gold hyperpyra from Richard's possessions. Initially, John's suzerain, the Prince of Achaea Philip of Savoy, found in his favour, especially after John paid him a "gift" of 3,656 pounds when he swore fealty to him on 7 April 1304. Margaret then sought the assistance of the powerful Marshal of Achaea, Nicholas III of Saint Omer, who was always ready to oppose the authoritarian government of Philip. In the end, after a violent quarrel between Nicholas and the Prince's supporters, a compromise was reached whereby John paid Margaret the sum of 20,000 hyperpyra. The Chronicle of the Morea also reports another episode of quarrel between Saint Omer and John: Saint Omer was married to John's sister, Guillerme, but neglected her and kept her confined to her castle, until John arranged for one of his relatives, William Orsini, to abduct her by night and bring her to Cephalonia.

Soon after his accession, in summer 1304, John and Philip of Savoy were ordered by King Charles II of Naples to attack Epirus, where the Byzantine princess Anna Palaiologina Kantakouzene, mother and regent of the under-age Despot Thomas I Komnenos Doukas, had refused to re-affirm Epirote vassalage to Naples and made common cause with the Byzantine Empire. John campaigned in Epirus alongside a large Achaean contingent, but their siege of the Epirote capital, Arta, failed and the allies withdrew. While Charles II remained determined to repeat the offensive next year, Anna managed to bribe Philip into staying in the Morea. Philip refused to campaign on the pretext of holding a grand parliament at Corinth, where all the barons and vassals of the Principality, including John, were assembled. As a result, Charles II deposed Philip of Savoy and transferred the Principality directly to his own son, Philip of Taranto. The new Prince launched another invasion of Epirus in 1307, which failed due to the outbreak of a disease among the Latin troops, but managed to wring some territorial concessions from Anna. According to the Aragonese version of the Chronicle of the Morea, John not only participated in this second expedition but actively instigated it, perhaps in hopes of replacing Thomas as ruler of Epirus.

In 1315, the infante Ferdinand of Majorca invaded the Morea and tried to seize the vacant princely throne in right of his wife, Isabella of Sabran. Like most of the barons and vassals of Achaea, John supported him at first but switched back to the legitimate heir, Princess Matilda of Hainaut, and her husband Louis of Burgundy, when they arrived in the Morea in early 1316. In the decisive Battle of Manolada on 5 July 1316, John led the first line of the loyalist army. Driven by rage over John's betrayal as well as his past mistreatment of Margaret of Villehardouin—Ferdinand's mother-in-law—the infante launched a furious assault that broke through John's line, but was held by the second line under Louis. In the resulting mêlée, Ferdinand was killed and his supporters routed. Barely a month later, Louis of Burgundy died at the age of 18, apparently of a disease. However, a pro-Catalan source asserts that Louis was poisoned by John.

John died in 1317, and was succeeded by his eldest son Nicholas, who in the very next year managed to turn his father's Epirote ambitions a reality: he murdered his uncle, the Despot Thomas, and assumed his place, bringing Epirus under Orsini rule.

== Issue ==
From his marriage with Maria Komnene Doukaina, John had four children:

- Nicholas Orsini
- John II Orsini
- Guy Orsini
- Margaret, lady of one half of Zakynthos, married Guglielmo Tocco

== Ancestry ==
Ancestors of John I Orsini

4. Matthew Orsini
2. Richard Orsini
20. Constantine Angelos
10. John Doukas
21. Theodora Komnene
5. daughter of John Doukas
11. Zoe Doukaina
1. John I Orsini

== Sources ==
- Bon, Antoine (1969). La Morée franque. Recherches historiques, topographiques et archéologiques sur la principauté d'Achaïe [The Frankish Morea. Historical, Topographic and Archaeological Studies on the Principality of Achaea] (in French). Paris: De Boccard.
- Kiesewetter, Andreas (2006). "Preludio alla Quarta Crociata? Megareites di Brindisi, Maio di Cefalonia e la signoria sulle isole ionie (1185-1250)". In Gherardo Ortalli; Giorgio Ravegnani; Peter Schreiner (eds.). Quarta Crociata. Venezia - Bisanzio - Impero latino. Atti delle giornate di studio. Venezia, 4-8 maggio 2004 (in Italian). Venice: Istituto veneto di scienze, lettere ed arti. pp. 317–358. ISBN 8888143742.
- Longnon, Jean (1969) [1962]. "The Frankish States in Greece, 1204–1311". In Setton, Kenneth M.; Wolff, Robert Lee; Hazard, Harry W. (eds.). A History of the Crusades, Volume II: The Later Crusades, 1189–1311. Vol. 2 (Second ed.). Madison, Milwaukee, and London: University of Wisconsin Press. pp. 234–275. ISBN 0-299-04844-6.
- Topping, Peter (1975). "The Morea, 1311–1364". In Setton, Kenneth M.; Hazard, Harry W. (eds.). A History of the Crusades, Volume III: The Fourteenth and Fifteenth Centuries. Vol. 3. Madison and London: University of Wisconsin Press. pp. 104–140. ISBN 0-299-06670-3.
- Nicol, Donald M. (1984). The Despotate of Epiros, 1267–1479: A Contribution to the History of Greece in the Middle Ages. Cambridge: Cambridge University Press. ISBN 978-0-521-13089-9.

Preceded by Richard Orsini	Count palatine of Cephalonia and Zakynthos; 1303/4–1317	Succeeded by Nicholas Orsini
