= Nikephoros I (disambiguation) =

Nikephoros I or Nicephorus I may refer to:

- Nikephoros I Logothetes (ca. 760–811), Byzantine emperor in 802-811
- Nikephoros I of Constantinople (ca. 750–828), Patriarch of Constantinople in 806–815
- Nicephorus I of Kiev, Metropolitan bishop of Kiev, 1104–1121
- Nikephoros I Komnenos Doukas (ca. 1240 – ca. 1296/8), Despot of Epirus in 1266/8–1296/8
