= Hermoniakos' Iliad =

Abridged version of the Iliad

The Hermoniakos' Iliad (Greek: Ἰλιάς Κωνσταντίνου Ἑρμονιακοῦ) is a 14th-century Byzantine paraphrase of the Iliad composed by Constantine Hermoniakos. The poem was commissioned by the Despot of Epirus, who asked Hermoniakos to write a new version of this epic in the Greek vernacular language.

== Background and text ==
Constantine Hermoniakos was a 14th-century Byzantine scholar and poet. Little is known about him, except that he lived in the courtly circles of Arta, the capital of the Despotate of Epirus, a successor state of the Byzantine Empire. After being commissioned by the Despot John II Orsini (1323–1335) and his wife Anna Palaiologina, ca. 1330, he composed his paraphrase of Homer's epic Iliad. The poem consists of 8,799 unrhymed trochaic octasyllables and is divided into 24 rhapsodies and 142 chapters.

== Contents and style ==
Hermoniakos' Iliad was mainly based on two 12th-century works: the Chronike Synopsis of Constantine Manasses and John Tzetzes' Allegories of the Iliad. His intention was to make Homer easy to comprehend for his contemporaries, so while some sections are copied verbatim, others are considerably altered to remove "pagan" references to the Olympian gods and to reflect the more familiar circumstances of the late medieval Greek world. As for the plot, Hermoniakos deals with both the war itself as well as the events that happened before and after. However he falsifies the events of the Iliad and introduces characters that were alien to the Trojan Cycle, thus giving for example Achilles a regiment of Hungarian and Bulgarian troops.

The poem is written in a vernacular language with a mix of learned and popular idioms. Moreover, it has been argued that Hermoniakos' work was an example of Byzantine pedantry and shows considerably less exposure to western courtly romance than other works of that era, like the novel Kallimachos and Chrysorrhoe. The work was published by Emile Legrand in 1890.
