= Carlo I Tocco =

Despot of Epirus, ruled 1411–1429

Carlo I Tocco (Ancient Greek: Κάρολος Κατακουζηνᾶτος δέ Τόκκω) was the hereditary Count Palatine of Cephalonia and Zakynthos from 1376, and ruled as the Despot of Epirus from 1411 until his death on July 4, 1429.

== Life ==
Carlo I was the son of Count Leonardo I Tocco of Cephalonia and Leukas by Maddalena de' Buondelmonti, sister of Esau de' Buondelmonti, ruler of Ioannina. Leonardo I Tocco, who was count of Cephalonia from 1357 until his death in 1376, as well as duke of Leukas from 1362, was himself the son of Guglielmo Tocco, governor of Corfu for the Angevins, and Margherita Orsini, sister of Nicholas Orsini and John II Orsini, rulers of Epirus and counts of Cephalonia. In this way, Carlo Tocco inherited a claim to Epirus from both the Orsini and the Buondelmonti. Carlo I succeeded his father as count of Cephalonia and duke of Leukas on the latter's death in 1376. He shared power with his brother Leonardo II, who was invested with the island of Zante as appanage in 1399.

=== Expansion in the Morea ===
Carlo I Tocco's territorial expansion on the Greek mainland

His marriage to Francesca, daughter of the Duke of Athens Nerio I Acciaioli, gave Carlo a claim on Corinth and Megara after Nerio's death, which he seized in 1395.

Carlo's island holdings could not produce a large army, and so he gathered an army of mercenaries from different backgrounds: Franks, Byzantines, Serbs and mostly Albanians. Carlo awarded their leaders with diverse gifts and fiefs on an island near Lefkada, encouraging them to view him as a trusted benefactor. This prompted additional Albanian archontes to join Carlo with their men. From the beginning of his conquests, Carlo's army was composed mainly of Albanians, and they were rewarded with lands held in fee. Even after Carlo's continuous territorial expansion, Albanians who had served Gjin Bua Shpata were employed by Carlo as mercenaries, and he bolstered his ranks with additional mercenaries from Ioannina and Vlachia, who were described as archontes and archontopoula with their men.

He intermittently became involved with the affairs of the Principality of Achaea as well: in 1407–1408 his brother Leonardo seized and plundered the fortress of Glarentza, in the northwestern Morea, and in 1421 Carlo bought permanent possession of it from Oliverio Franco, who had seized it from the Achaean prince Centurione II Zaccaria three years earlier. Achaea's main enemy, the Byzantines of the Despotate of the Morea initially seemed content to leave Tocco alone, given their shared hostility against Zaccaria, but war between the two powers was provoked in late 1426, when Tocco's forces seized the animals of Albanian herders during the latter's annual migration from the Byzantine-controlled central uplands to the plain of Elis. In 1427, the Byzantine emperor, John VIII Palaiologos led a campaign against Glarentza, and in the Battle of the Echinades, the Byzantine fleet defeated Tocco's own. This ended Tocco's ability to intervene in the Morea, and his possessions were liquidated in a negotiated settlement, in which John VIII's brother Constantine Palaiologos (later last Byzantine emperor as Constantine XI) married Creusa Tocco, Carlo's niece, and received Glarentza and the other Tocco territories as her dowry.

=== Expansion in Epirus ===
Coat of arms of Carlo I Tocco as count of Cephalonia and ruler of Epirus

From 1405 Carlo controlled several fortresses on the mainland, including Angelokastro. He was invited as the successor of his uncle Esau de' Buondelmonti in Ioannina after the rejection of the latter's widow and son in February 1411. Nevertheless, he had to overcome the determined opposition of the Albanian clans, and in particular of the ruler of Arta, Yaqub Spata.

In spite of a victory over Carlo in 1412, the Albanians failed to take Ioannina. On the contrary, not long after Maurice died, and Yaqub was killed in battle in 1416, Carlo advanced on Arta and obtained its surrender in 1416. Arta was entrusted to Carlo's younger brother Leonardo II, and now the Tocchi controlled all major towns in Epirus. In 1415 he was granted the title despotes by the Byzantine Emperor Manuel II Palaiologos. Moreover, as part of the Byzantine tradition he adopted, he signed all his official letters and decrees in Greek.

The privileged military class of the stratiotai was found in particular amongst the population of Ioannina. In Carlo's army, the highest-ranking military officer was the kapetanios (plu. kapetanioi), and almost all of the important military and diplomatic actions were entrusted to these officers. The few known names of Tocco's kapetanioi belong mostly to Italian nobles, and the Tocco greatly trusted their compatriots and family members. The second most trustworthy component in Carlo's army were the Byzantine Greeks, particularly those from Ioannina. After this came the Albanian warriors, who despite serving in the army of the Tocco, were commanded by their own archontes. Nonetheless, the archontes of both the Albanians and the Greeks were subordinated to the kapetanioi. The only Albanian officer and vassal of Carlo Tocco who was considered loyal and trustworthy was Demos Bua, who was entrusted with Angelokastron, Katoche and their surroundings. Carlo would later station Albanians in the Peloponnese, where he needed them as soldiers.

Apart from his conflict with the Byzantine rulers of Morea (the Peloponnese) over Elis, Carlo spent the remainder of his reign in relative peace.

Although he had several illegitimate children, he was succeeded by his nephew Carlo II Tocco, the son of Leonardo II. His niece Creusa Tocco (not Maddelena Tocco as was previously thought) married Constantine XI.

== Family ==
Carlo I Tocco had no children from his marriage to Francesca Acciaioli, daughter of Nerio I Acciaioli, Duke of Athens. By a relationship with an unnamed mistress, Carlo had five illegitimate sons:

- Memnone of Acarnania
- Ercole, married Petronella Shpata, had two children Carlo Tocco and Leonardo Tocco
- Turno
- Antonio
- Orlando of Reniassa

He also had two daughters

- Unknown daughter, married Carlo Marchesano who was the son of Irene Shpata

His other illegitimate daughter married the Ottoman prince Musa Çelebi in 1412. She was widowed on 5 July 1413.

== Chronicle of the Tocco ==
Significant information about Carlo I Tocco is found in Chronicle of the Tocco which was evidently written by one of his contemporaries, covering 1375–1425, including therefore the period of Carlo's rule.

== Sources ==
- Fine, John V. A. Jr. (1994) [1987]. The Late Medieval Balkans: A Critical Survey from the Late Twelfth Century to the Ottoman Conquest. Ann Arbor, Michigan: University of Michigan Press. ISBN 978-0-472-10079-8.
- Hendrickx, Benjamin; Sansaridou-Hendrickx, Thekla (1 January 2009). "The Military Organization and the Army of the Despotate of the Tocco (14Th-15Th Cent.)". Acta Patristica et Byzantina. 20 (1): 215–231. doi:10.1080/10226486.2009.11879105. ISSN 1022-6486.
- Kastritsis, Dimitris (2007). The Sons of Bayezid: Empire Building and Representation in the Ottoman Civil War of 1402-1413. Brill.
- Kazhdan, Alexander, ed. (1991). The Oxford Dictionary of Byzantium. Oxford and New York: Oxford University Press. ISBN 0-19-504652-8.
- Kyriakidis, Savvas (2013). "The Wars and the Army of the Duke of Cephalonia Carlo I Tocco (c. 1375–1429)". Journal of Medieval Military History. XI. Woodbridge: The Boydell Press: 167–181. ISBN 978-1-84383-860-9. ISSN 1477-545X.
- Miller, William (1908). The Latins in the Levant: A History of Frankish Greece (1204–1566). London: John Murray.
- Nicol, Donald MacGillivray (1997). "Late Byzantine Period (1204–1479)". Epirus, 4000 Years of Greek History and Civilization. Ekdotike Athenon. pp. 198–237. ISBN 9789602133712.
- Nicol, Donald M. (1984). The Despotate of Epiros, 1267–1479: A Contribution to the History of Greece in the Middle Ages. Cambridge: Cambridge University Press. ISBN 978-0-521-13089-9.
- Setton, Kenneth M. (1978). The Papacy and the Levant (1204–1571), Volume II: The Fifteenth Century. Vol. 2. Philadelphia: The American Philosophical Society. ISBN 0-87169-127-2.
- Soulis, George Christos (1984), The Serbs and Byzantium during the reign of Tsar Stephen Dušan (1331–1355) and his successors, Dumbarton Oaks, ISBN 0-88402-137-8
- Zečević, Nada (2014). The Tocco of the Greek Realm: Nobility, Power and Migration in Latin Greece (14th-15th centuries). Belgrade: Makart. ISBN 9788691944100.

| Preceded by Leonardo I Tocco | Count palatine of Cephalonia; 1375/77–1429 | Succeeded by Carlo II Tocco |
| Preceded by Giorgio de' Buondelmonti as ruler of Ioannina | Despot of Epirus; 1411/16–1429 | Succeeded by Carlo II Tocco |
| Preceded by Yaqub Spata as ruler of Arta | Despot of Epirus; 1411/16–1429 | Succeeded by Carlo II Tocco |
