= Theodore, Count Palatine of Cephalonia and Zakynthos =

Theodore (Greek: κόντε Θεόδωρος, born between 1227-1238?-died c.a. 1260?), is believed to have possibly been the second Count Palatine of Cephalonia and Zakynthos of the (erroneously so called) Orsini (or more correctly de Monopoli or de Cefalonia) dynasty.

== Life ==
Very little is actually known about Theodore. Our very evidence for his existence is very limited, as he is only mentioned in one Greek ecclesiastical document of 1264 as κόντε Θεόδωρος (count Theodore). While older scholarship considered that count Matthew of Cephalonia had been succeeded by the well known in sources count Richard, who they viewed as his son, historian Andreas Kiesewetter has more recently argued that Matthew was actually succeeded after his death c.a. 1238 by Theodore, likely his son with a sister of the Epirote ruler Theodore Doukas, who he had married around 1226/7. Besides the Greek document, he also bases this assumption on the account of the 18th century Catholic bishop of Cephalonia and Zakynthos, Baldassarre Maria Remondini, who mentions a now lost document which confirmed the existence of another count between Matthew and Richard. Richard thus, according to Kiesewetter, should be considered Theodore's son, instead of Matthew's, and third count palatine of Cephalonia and Zakynthos.

Theodore must have died around 1260/1, as, upon his return from Byzantine captivity in 1262, William II Villehardouin, prince of Achaia and overlord of the county of Cephalonia and Zakynthos, assumed the guardianship of the, still underage, count Richard.
