= Thamar Angelina Komnene =

Queen of Albania

- Queen consort of Albania; Princess consort of Taranto

Queen consort of Albania
- Tenure: 13 August 1294 – 1309
- Predecessor: Mary of Hungary
- Successor: Catherine of Valois–Courtenay
- Died: 1311
- Spouse: Philip I of Taranto (m. 1294; div. 1309)
- Issue: Charles of Taranto; Joan of Taranto; Philip, Despot of Romania; Maria; Beatrice; Bianca
- House: Komnenos Doukas
- Father: Nikephoros I Komnenos Doukas
- Mother: Anna Palaiologina Kantakouzene

Thamar Angelina Komnene (Greek: Θαμάρ Αγγελίνα Κομνηνή; died c. 1311) was a princess consort of Taranto and Queen consort of Albania by marriage to Prince Philip I.

== Life ==
Thamar was the daughter of Nikephoros I Komnenos Doukas of the Despotate of Epirus and his second wife Anna Palaiologina Kantakouzene, niece of the Byzantine Emperor Michael VIII Palaiologos. Her older paternal half-sister was Maria, who married Count John I Orsini of Cephalonia (1304–1317). She also had two younger full-brother: Michael died before becoming despotes; and Thomas I Komnenos Doukas, who would go on to become despotes himself.

=== Marriage ===
Thamar’s mother wished to heal the breach between Epirus and the Byzantine Empire. To reunite Epirus with the Empire, Anna wanted to marry Thamar to Michael, the son and co-emperor of Andronikos II Palaiologos. The idea was rejected by Andronikos and it was viewed as uncanonical by the Church because the two were cousins.

With the failure of Anna’s plan, Thamar's father Nikephoros attempted to strengthen his independence from Constantinople by allying himself with the Angevin dynasty of Naples. King Charles II of Naples had already proposed a marital union between their two houses, and after lengthy negotiations, Nikephoros came to an agreement by which Thamar would marry Charles’ fourth son Philip I of Taranto.

The conditions for the marriage alliance were that her dowry would give Philip the same position in Epirus that King Manfred of Sicily, had gained through his marriage to Thamar’s aunt Helena Angelina Doukaina 35 years before. It was also promised that Thamar would bring to her husband an annual sum of 100,000 hyperpyra and four castles located in the south of Epirus. Philip and Thamar were also to inherit Epirus on Nikephoros' death. Due to the involvement of her mother in the agreement, Thamar was allowed to keep her Orthodox faith.

The wedding took place at L'Aquila in Abruzzo in August 1294.

=== Princess of Taranto ===
Thamar's marriage did not turn out to be a happy one. Five years after their wedding her husband was captured and imprisoned by the Aragonese. She pawned her coronet, and also begged money from her family in Epirus to pay the ransom for his release. She did not see him again until 1302. In Taranto she came under pressure to assimilate into Latin ways. Despite the promises made at the time of her marriage she was forced to become a Catholic under the name Catherine (Caterina). The relationship between the spouses soured further when difficulties arose between the Angevins and Epirus, which had been inherited by Thamar's young brother Thomas.

=== Divorce and death ===
Philip suspected his wife of acting in her family's interests over his during the two-year conflict that raged between the Angevins and Epirus, despite the fact that she had pawned the remainder of her jewellery to help him pay for the military effort. Distrustful of Thamar, Philip decided to divorce her and in 1309 accused her of having committed adultery. She was forced into confessing that she had slept with at least forty of the lords of his court and that she had formed a particular relationship with Bartolomeo Siginulfo, the Grand Chamberlain of Taranto. Once the marriage had been dissolved Philip went on to take a new wife, Catherine II of Valois, the titular Empress of Constantinople. Thamar became an outcast, either becoming a nun or being imprisoned by her ex-husband. In either case, she died not long afterwards in 1311.

== Children ==
By her marriage to Philip I of Taranto, Thamar had six children:

- Charles (1296–1315), Vicar of Romania, killed at the Battle of Montecatini.
- Jeanne (1297–1317), married to Oshin of Armenia and then Oshin of Korikos
- Philip (1300–1330), Despot of Romania.
- Maria (1302/04-1368), Abbess of Conversano.
- Beatrice (1305–1340), married to Walter VI of Brienne, titular Duke of Athens.
- Bianca (1309–1337), married to Infante Ramón Berenguer of Aragon, Count of Prades.

== Sources ==
- Fine, John V. A. Jr. (1994) [1987]. The Late Medieval Balkans: A Critical Survey from the Late Twelfth Century to the Ottoman Conquest. Ann Arbor, Michigan: University of Michigan Press. ISBN 978-0-472-10079-8. OCLC 749133662.
- Kazhdan, Alexander, ed. (1991). The Oxford Dictionary of Byzantium. Oxford and New York: Oxford University Press. ISBN 0-19-504652-8.
- Nicol, Donald M. (1994). The Byzantine Lady: Ten Portraits, 1250–1500. Cambridge and New York: Cambridge University Press. ISBN 0-521-45531-6.
- Nicol, Donald MacGillivray (2010). The Despotate of Epiros 1267–1479: A Contribution to the History of Greece in the Middle Ages. Cambridge: Cambridge University Press. ISBN 978-0-521-13089-9.

Vacant Title last held by Mary of Hungary as Queen consort of Naples	Princess consort of Achaea; 1306/7–1309	Vacant Title next held by Agnes of Périgord as Duchess consort of Durazzo
