= Anna Palaiologina Kantakouzene =

Anna Palaiologina Kantakouzene (Greek: Άννα Καντακουζηνή) (died after 1313) was the niece of the Byzantine emperor Michael VIII Palaiologos, second wife of Nikephoros I Komnenos Doukas of Epirus and regent of Epirus upon his death around 1297.

== Background ==
Anna was the third of four daughters born to John Kantakouzenos and his wife Irene Palaiologia (Eulogia Palaiologina), sister of Michael VIII Palaiologos. Anna and her three sisters all lived to adulthood, they were: Theodora Raoulaina, wife of George Mouzalon, Maria Palaiologina Kantakouzene, Empress consort of Bulgaria and Eugenia Palaiologina Kantakouzene, wife of Syrgiannes and mother of Syrgiannes Palaiologos.

== Marriage to Nikephoros ==
Anna was married in the autumn of 1264 to Nikephoros I Komnenos Doukas as part of a peace agreement between her uncle Emperor Michael and Nikephoros' father Michael II Komnenos Doukas, the leader of the pro-Byzantine party in Epirus. Anna dominated her husband, similar to her sisters Maria and Theodora. She became Despotess of Neopatras in 1289. Nikephoros had been married once before to Maria, the daughter of Emperor Theodore II Doukas Laskaris and had one daughter, Maria.

After the restoration of Orthodoxy under Andronikos II Palaiologos in 1282, Nikephoros renewed the alliance with the Byzantine Empire through Anna, who travelled to Constantinople to arrange the treaty; Anna herself served the interests of the Byzantine court. In 1284 they lured Michael, the son of John Doukas of Thessaly, to Epirus with the promise of a dynastic alliance, and had him arrested and sent off to Constantinople. This drew Nikephoros into a war against his half-brother, who ravaged the environs of Arta in retaliation in 1285. Anna embarked on an ambitious project of uniting the houses of Epirus and Constantinople by marrying her daughter Thamar to Michael IX Palaiologos, Andronikos II's son and co-emperor. Although this project failed, in 1290 her young son Thomas was conferred the dignity of Despot by the emperor.

The anti-Byzantine aristocracy now persuaded Nikephoros to open negotiations with King Charles II of Naples in 1291, which provoked a Byzantine invasion. This sealed the alliance with Naples, and Charles II's intervention through his vassals Count Riccardo Orsini of Cephalonia and Prince Florent of Achaea helped contain the Byzantine advance. The couple married Maria to the heir to Cephalonia and their daughter Thamar to Charles II's son Philip I of Taranto. Thamar was given the right to inherit Epirus instead of her brother, and Charles II promised that she would be allowed to remain in the Orthodox faith. The wedding took place in 1294 and involved the transfer of several coastal fortresses to Philip as Thamar's dowry. Philip simultaneously received his father's rights and claims in Greece.

== Regency ==
Nikephoros died between September 1296 and July 1298. Anna ensured the succession of their underage son Thomas, although Philip had been promised to inherit Epirus in right of his wife Thamar. Charles II of Naples demanded that Epirus be turned over to Philip and Thamar, but Anna refused, claiming that the arrangement had been broken when Thamar had been forced to abandon her Orthodox faith. In 1304 Anna sought support from Emperor Andronikos II. An alliance was concluded and sealed by the marriage of young Thomas to Anna Palaiologina, the daughter of the co-Emperor Michael IX Palaiologos, Andronikos' granddaughter.

The actual marriage took place in 1307 or 1313. In the meantime Charles II sent troops into Epirus, but they were repulsed and the Epirotes advanced into the Angevin lands in the western Balkans, recovering Butrint and Naupaktos in 1304–1305. A new Angevin invasion in 1307, aiming to overthrow Anna ended with a compromise by which Philip of Taranto was ceded many of the fortresses that had been retaken by the Epirotes in the previous war.

Anna is last mentioned as part of the list of Barons "de Romania" with whom the Republic of Venice maintained relations in 1313, her fate is unknown after this point.

== Issue ==
Anna and Nikephoros had three children:

- Thamar, who married Philip I of Taranto, a son of King Charles II of Naples.
- Michael, who was a hostage at Naples in 1279 but returned to his parents in 1281. He presumably died before his father.
- Thomas, who succeeded as ruler of Epirus.

== Sources ==
- Fine, John Van Antwerp (1994). The Late Medieval Balkans: A Critical Survey from the Late Twelfth Century to the Ottoman Conquest. Ann Arbor: University of Michigan Press. ISBN 978-0-472-08260-5.987.
- Kazhdan, Alexander, ed. (1991). The Oxford Dictionary of Byzantium. Oxford and New York: Oxford University Press. ISBN 0-19-504652-8.
