= Nikephoros I Komnenos Doukas =

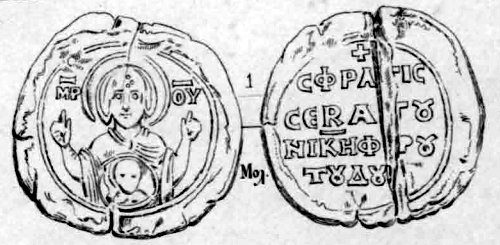
- Lead seal possibly belonging to Nikephoros

Despot of Epirus
- Reign: 1266/68–1296/98
- Predecessor: Michael II Komnenos Doukas
- Successor: Thomas I Komnenos Doukas
- Born: c. 1240
- Died: 1297
- Spouse: Maria Laskaris Vatatzaina; Anna Palaiologina Kantakouzene
- Issue: Maria; Thamar; Michael; Thomas I
- Dynasty: Komnenos Doukas
- Father: Michael II
- Mother: Theodora Petraliphaina

Nikephoros I Komnenos Doukas, Latinized as Nicephorus I Comnenus Ducas (Greek: Νικηφόρος Κομνηνός Δούκας, romanized: Nikēphoros Komnēnos Doukas; c. 1240 – c. 1290) was ruler of Epirus from 1267/8 to his death in 1296/98.

== Life ==
Born around 1240, Nikephoros was the eldest son of the Despot of Epirus, Michael II Komnenos Doukas, and Theodora Petraliphaina. In c. 1249, at Pegai, Nikephoros was betrothed to Maria Laskaris Vatatzaina, the daughter of Theodore II Laskaris and granddaughter of the Nicaean emperor John III Doukas Vatatzes, who conferred on him the dignity of despotes. The marriage took place at Thessalonica in October 1256, but Maria died in 1258.

In the following years Nikephoros was engaged in his father's struggle against Emperor Michael VIII Palaiologos and together with his father retreated before the Battle of Pelagonia. After the Nicaeans overran most of Epirus in 1259, Nikephoros left for the Italian Peninsula, where he received reinforcements from his brother-in-law King Manfred of Sicily. With this support Nikephoros helped his father reconquer Epirus, but in 1264 they suffered another defeat, and were forced to come to terms with Michael VIII. As part of the peace agreement, Nikephoros was married to Anna Kantakouzene, a niece of Michael VIII.

In 1267/8 Nikephoros I succeeded his father as ruler of Epirus and had to deal with Charles I of Sicily, who had eliminated Manfred and followed in his footsteps by capturing Dyrrhachium in 1272. When the Byzantines infringed on Nikephoros' interests in their retaliatory campaign against Charles in 1274, Nikephoros opened negotiations with Charles and concluded an alliance with him in 1276. The coalition of Charles of Anjou, Nikephoros, and the latter's half-brother John I Doukas of Thessaly gained several cities, including Butrinto in 1278. Ironically, while being allied with a Catholic monarch, Nikephoros and John acted as supporters of the anti-Unionist faction in Byzantium, whom they sheltered from Michael VIII's persecutions. In 1279 Nikephoros acknowledged himself Charles' vassal and surrendered Butrinto to his overlord. With Charles' defeat soon after, Nikephoros lost his holdings in Albania to the Byzantines. The coalition received a major blow with outbreak of the Sicilian Vespers in 1282, which were partly fomented by Michael VIII's diplomacy and distracted Charles I in the West, where he lost Sicily and retained only the Kingdom of Naples.

After the restoration of Orthodoxy under Andronikos II Palaiologos in 1282, Nikephoros renewed the alliance with the Byzantine Empire through his wife Anna, who traveled to Constantinople to arrange the treaty. In fact Nikephoros became a willing tool in the hands of his wife Anna, who served the interests of the Byzantine court. In 1284 they lured Michael, the son of John Doukas of Thessaly, to Epirus with the promise of a dynastic alliance, and had him arrested and sent off to Constantinople. This drew Nikephoros into a war against his half-brother, who ravaged the environs of Arta in retaliation in 1285. Anna embarked on an ambitious project of uniting the houses of Epirus and Constantinople by marrying her daughter Thamar to Michael IX Palaiologos, Andronikos II's son and co-emperor. Although this project failed, in 1290 her young son Thomas was conferred the dignity of despotes by the emperor.

The anti-Byzantine aristocracy now persuaded Nikephoros to open negotiations with King Charles II of Naples in 1291, which provoked a Byzantine invasion. This sealed the alliance with Naples, and Charles II's intervention through his vassals Count Riccardo Orsini of Cephalonia and Prince Florent of Achaea helped contain the Byzantine advance. Nikephoros now married his daughter Maria to the heir to Cephalonia and his other daughter Thamar to Charles II's son Philip I of Taranto. Thamar was given the right to inherit Epirus instead of her brother, and Charles II promised that she would be allowed to remain in the Orthodox faith. The wedding took place in 1294 and involved the transfer of several coastal fortresses to Philip as Thamar's dowry. Philip simultaneously received his father's rights and claims in Greece.

The inevitable tension between local Greek landlords and their Angevin overlord created an opportunity for the Nikephoros' nephew, the ruler of Thessaly, to intervene and to seize mostly the fortresses that had been turned over to Philip. Eventually most of these were recovered by the Angevins and peace was restored in 1296. Nikephoros died shortly after the conclusion of the peace, between September 1296 and July 1298. His widow Anna ensured the succession of their underage son Thomas.

== Family ==
From his first marriage, Nikephoros had a daughter, Maria. She married the future Count John I Orsini of Cephalonia (1304–1317) in 1294; their sons Nicholas Orsini and John II Orsini became despots in Epirus.

By his second wife Anna, the niece of Emperor Michael VIII Palaiologos, Nikephoros I had three children:

- Thamar, who married Philip I of Taranto, a son of King Charles II of Naples.
- Michael, he was a hostage at Glarentza in 1279–1281. He presumably died before his father.
- Thomas, who succeeded as ruler of Epirus.

== Sources ==
- Fine, John V. A., Jr. (1994) [1987]. The Late Medieval Balkans: A Critical Survey from the Late Twelfth Century to the Ottoman Conquest. Ann Arbor, Michigan: University of Michigan Press. ISBN 978-0-472-10079-8.
- Kazhdan, Alexander, ed. (1991). The Oxford Dictionary of Byzantium. Oxford and New York: Oxford University Press. ISBN 0-19-504652-8.
- Nicol, Donald M. (1984). The Despotate of Epiros, 1267–1479: A Contribution to the History of Greece in the Middle Ages. Cambridge: Cambridge University Press. ISBN 978-0-521-13089-9.
- Polemis, Demetrios I. (1968). The Doukai: A Contribution to Byzantine Prosopography. London: The Athlone Press.
- Trapp, Erich; Beyer, Hans-Veit; Walther, Rainer; Sturm-Schnabl, Katja; Kislinger, Ewald; Leontiadis, Ioannis; Kaplaneres, Sokrates (1976–1996). Prosopographisches Lexikon der Palaiologenzeit (in German). Vienna: Verlag der Österreichischen Akademie der Wissenschaften. ISBN 3-7001-3003-1.

Preceded by Michael II	Despot of Epirus; 1268–1296/98	Succeeded by Thomas I
