= Nicholas Orsini =

Despot of Epirus from 1318 to 1323

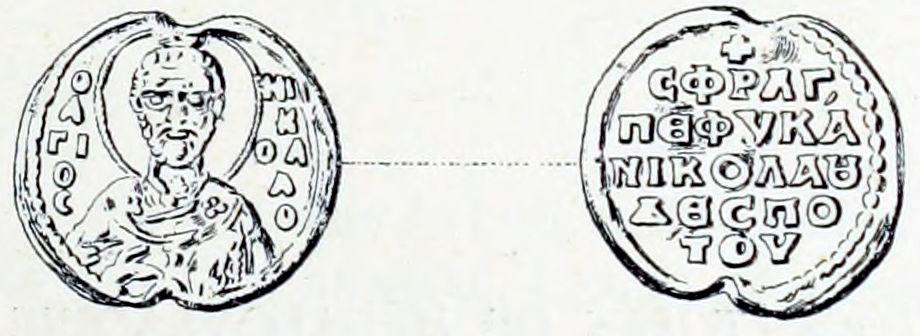
- Byzantine-style seal of Nicholas with a bust of Saint Nicholas, and with his title of despot

Despot of Epirus
- Reign: 1318–1323
- Predecessor: Thomas Komnenos Doukas
- Successor: John II Orsini

Count palatine of Cephalonia
- Reign: 1317–1323
- Predecessor: John I Orsini
- Successor: John II Orsini
- Died: 1323
- Spouse: Anna Palaiologina
- Dynasty: Orsini ('apostolic' branch)
- Father: John I Orsini
- Mother: Maria Komnene Doukaina

Nicholas Orsini (Italian: Nicolò Orsini; Greek: Νικόλαος Ορσίνι, romanized: Nikolaos Orsini) was a Greek–Italian nobleman who was count palatine of Cephalonia from 1317 to 1323 and ruler of southern Epirus around Arta from 1318 to 1323. The son of Count John I Orsini and Maria, an Epirote princess, he succeeded his father upon the latter's death, and in the next year murdered his uncle, Thomas Komnenos Doukas, and usurped his rule of Epirus. While able to secure his control over southern Epirus, however, the north with the city of Ioannina were taken over by the Byzantine Empire. Nicholas' attempts to ally with the Republic of Venice and recover Ioannina failed, and he was in turn killed by his brother John II Orsini in 1323.

== Life ==
Nicholas was the son of Count John I Orsini of Cephalonia by Maria, a daughter of Nikephoros I Komnenos Doukas of Epirus by Maria Laskaris. His father governed Cephalonia as a vassal of King Charles II of Naples, and had acquired Leukas as his wife's dowry. John had a close relationship with his father-in-law, and with his wife lived at the Epirote court at Arta until 1303, when John succeeded his father, Richard Orsini. John nevertheless joined in attacks on Epirus ordered by his Angevin suzerains, King Charles II of Naples and Philip of Taranto in 1304 and 1306. John appears to have played a part in instigating these attacks, apparently aiming to become the new ruler of Epirus.

Nicholas succeeded to the county on his father's death in 1317, and like his father also set his sights on Epirus. In 1318 he surprised and murdered his childless uncle, Thomas I Komnenos Doukas of Epirus, and easily subdued the entire southern portion of the principality around Arta. To solidify his position among the local population, Nicholas espoused Eastern Orthodoxy, used the Greek language, and married his uncle's widow, Anna Palaiologina, daughter of the Byzantine co-emperor Michael IX Palaiologos and granddaughter of Emperor Andronikos II Palaiologos. Although Anna was his aunt, the Church appears to have acquiesced to their marriage. The historian Donald Nicol suggests that Anna may have been involved in Thomas' murder, as he had mistreated her.

The Angevins did not entirely welcome Nicholas' actions, as they clashed with their own claims over Epirus. While Nicholas had sworn allegiance to the new Prince of Achaea, John of Gravina in 1318 as the latter's feudal vassal, in the next year, when prompted to render homage as ruler of Epirus as well, he refused. At the same time, the Byzantines took advantage of Nicholas' lack of legitimacy to occupy the northern part of the Epirote realm, including Ioannina, which declared itself for the Byzantine emperor as soon as the murder of Thomas became known.

When Nicholas sent to Emperor Andronikos to seek recognition of his new status, the emperor agreed to award him the title of despot (in 1319/20) in exchange for Nicholas' pledge to recognize the loss of Ioannina. In the meantime, Nicholas tried to form an alliance with the Republic of Venice, which had wide-ranging commercial and political interests in the area. In May 1320 he sent ambassadors to Venice, offering to acknowledge Venetian overlordship and hand over either the lucrative fishing grounds of Lake Butrint, or the sugarcane plantations of Parga. Not wishing to alienate the Byzantines, the Venetians politely refused. Nevertheless, already in 1320, Nicholas began harassing the Byzantine domains in Epirus, and his ties to the Byzantine court ended when his wife Anna died in the same year.

Following the outbreak of a Byzantine civil war shortly after, Nicholas saw an excellent opportunity to recover the Epirote to his north. Within a short time, he was besieging Ioannina. He was aided by the Venetians, who under the command of Giovanni Michiel opportunistically attacked the port of Valona. Nevertheless, both attacks were repulsed by the Byzantine garrisons. In Ioannina in particular, the local citizens eagerly participated in the defence of both their city and the extensive privileges granted to them by Andronikos II. Shortly after, in 1323, he was killed—either by murder or as a result of a brief conflict—by his brother John II Orsini.

== Sources ==
- Fine, John V. A. (1994) [1987]. The Late Medieval Balkans: A Critical Survey from the Late Twelfth Century to the Ottoman Conquest. Ann Arbor, Michigan: University of Michigan Press. ISBN 978-0-472-10079-8.
- Longnon, Jean (1969) [1962]. "The Frankish States in Greece, 1204–1311". In Setton, Kenneth M.; Wolff, Robert Lee; Hazard, Harry W. (eds.). A History of the Crusades, Volume II: The Later Crusades, 1189–1311. Vol. 2 (Second ed.). Madison, Milwaukee, and London: University of Wisconsin Press. pp. 234–275. ISBN 0-299-04844-6.
- Miller, William (1908). The Latins in the Levant: A History of Frankish Greece (1204–1566). London: John Murray.
- Nicol, Donald M. (1984). The Despotate of Epiros, 1267–1479: A Contribution to the History of Greece in the Middle Ages. Cambridge: Cambridge University Press. ISBN 978-0-521-13089-9.
- Topping, Peter (1975). "The Morea, 1311–1364". In Setton, Kenneth M.; Hazard, Harry W. (eds.). A History of the Crusades, Volume III: The Fourteenth and Fifteenth Centuries. Vol. 3. Madison and London: University of Wisconsin Press. pp. 104–140. ISBN 0-299-06670-3.
- Trapp, Erich; Beyer, Hans-Veit; Walther, Rainer; Sturm-Schnabl, Katja; Kislinger, Ewald; Leontiadis, Ioannis; Kaplaneres, Sokrates (1976–1996). Prosopographisches Lexikon der Palaiologenzeit (in German). Vienna: Verlag der Österreichischen Akademie der Wissenschaften. ISBN 3-7001-3003-1.

Nicholas Orsini Orsini family Born: unknown Died: 1323
Preceded by Thomas I	Despot of Epirus; 1318–1323	Succeeded by John II
Preceded by John I	Count palatine of Cephalonia and Zakynthos; 1317–1323	Succeeded by John II
