= Theodora Tocco =

Wife of the last Byzantine emperor

Theodora Tocco (née Creusa Tocco; died November 1429) was the first wife of Constantine Palaiologos while he was Despot of Morea. Her husband would become the last Emperor of the Eastern Roman Empire.

== Family ==
Theodora (Creusa) Tocco was a daughter of Leonardo II Tocco, Lord of Zante. Her father was a younger brother of Carlo I Tocco, Count of Cephalonia and Leukas. Carlo would serve as ruler of Epirus from 1411 to 1429.

Leonardo seems to have died early. In 1424, Carlo I adopted Creusa and her brother Carlo II Tocco.

== Marriage ==
Carlo I was defeated at the Battle of the Echinades by John VIII Palaiologos in 1427. He had to withdraw from the parts of Elis under his control and relinquish his hereditary claims to Corinth and Megara. The agreement was sealed with the marriage of Creusa to Constantine Palaiologos, younger brother of John VIII.

The marriage occurred in July 1428. She was converted to the Eastern Orthodox Church and took the name "Theodora". During their life together, Constantine held various territories of the Peloponnese under his control though still subordinate to both John VIII and Theodore II Palaiologos, Lord of Morea.

== Death ==
Theodora died in November 1429 at Stameron, (either Estamira or Santameri Castle) while giving birth to a stillborn daughter. (Note: Nada Zečević makes no mention of a pregnancy, simply that Theodora died "shortly after her wedding ceremony".) She was buried in Mystras.
