= John II Orsini =

14th century Greek-Italian noble

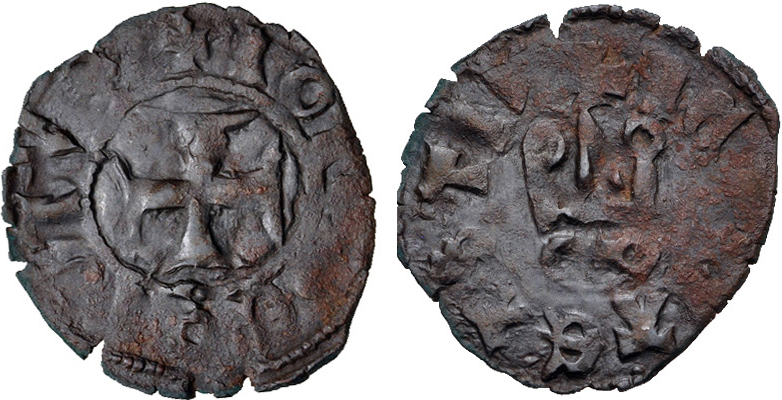
Denier minted under John II Orsini as ruler of Epirus

John II Orsini (Italian: Giovanni II Orsini), also John Komnenos Doukas or Comnenus Ducas (Ancient Greek: Ἰωάννης Κομνηνός Δούκας, romanized: Iōannēs Komnēnos Doukas), was a Greek-Italian noble man who rose to count palatine of Cephalonia from 1323 to 1324 and Despot of Epirus from 1323 to 1335.

== Life ==
John was the son of Count John I Orsini of Cephalonia by Maria, a daughter of Nikephoros I Komnenos Doukas of Epirus by Maria Laskaris. His older brother Nicholas Orsini had made himself ruler of Epirus in 1318 by murdering their maternal uncle Thomas I Komnenos Doukas. In 1323 John murdered his brother and succeeded in both Cephalonia and Epirus.

In 1324, John's Angevin overlord, John of Gravina, stopped at Cephalonia on his way to fight the Byzantines in the Peloponnese and deposed John Orsini as count of Cephalonia, annexing the island to his own domains. Deprived from his family base, John had to conclude peace with Andronikos II Palaiologos of the Byzantine Empire and was allowed to establish his control over all of Epirus in exchange for recognizing Byzantine suzerainty. He married Anna Palaiologina, the granddaughter of Demetrios (Michael) Doukas, a son of Michael II Komnenos Doukas of Epirus, who had entered into Byzantine service. Like his brother, John joined the Eastern Orthodox Church, and was awarded the title of despotes by the Byzantine emperor.

In 1331, John was attacked by Walter VI of Brienne, the titular duke of Athens, and a son-in-law of the Angevin Philip I of Taranto and Thamar Angelina Komnene. When Walter besieged Arta, John was forced to accept Angevin suzerainty. This situation was reversed when Walter returned to the Italian Peninsula; further, in 1332, John felt strong enough to invade and annex Thessaly, which had fallen into anarchy after the death of Stephen Gabrielopoulos. John's success provoked the immediate reaction of Emperor Andronikos III Palaiologos, who asserted his control over at least the eastern portion of the region. Back in Epirus John was divided between pro-Byzantine and pro-Angevin factions among the nobility. He died suddenly in 1335, perhaps poisoned by his wife Anna.

== Family ==
By his wife Anna Palaiologina, John II Orsini had two children:

- Nikephoros II Orsini, who succeeded as ruler of Epirus
- Thomais Orsini, who married Simeon Uroš Palaiologos, emperor (tsar) of Serbians and Greeks, who succeeded as ruler of Epirus in 1359. Their daughter Maria married the later rulers of Epirus Thomas II Preljubović and Esau de' Buondelmonti, ruling Epirus herself after Thomas's death until Esau was made despotes.

Preceded by Nicholas Orsini	Ruler of Epirus; 1323–1335	Succeeded by Nikephoros II Orsini
Preceded by Nicholas Orsini	Count of Cephalonia; 1323–1324	Annexed by the Kingdom of Naples
