= Carlo II Tocco =

Despot of Epirus, ruled 1429–1448

Carlo II Tocco (died 1448) was the ruler of Epirus from 1429 until his death.

== Life ==
Carlo II was the son of Leonardo II Tocco, the younger brother and co-ruler of Carlo I Tocco, count of Cephalonia and Zante, duke of Leukas, and ruler of Epirus. In 1424 Carlo II and his sisters were adopted by their uncle Carlo I. Carlo II's sister Maddalena Tocco married the future Byzantine Emperor Constantine XI Palaiologos in July 1428, but died in November 1429.

In July 1429 Carlo II succeeded his uncle Carlo I in all his jurisdictions. His succession was opposed, however, by Carlo I's illegitimate sons, led by Memnone. Memnone and his brothers appealed to the Ottoman Sultan Murad II for help in securing the inheritance of their father, and the sultan duly sent forth a force under Sinan. The Ottoman general entered into negotiations with the anti-Latin faction in Ioannina and, after guaranteeing the privileges of the nobility, obtained the surrender of the city on October 9, 1430.

Carlo II continued to rule over the remnants of his principality in Epirus from Arta as an Ottoman vassal, while the illegitimate sons of his uncle received holdings in Acarnania as Ottoman dependents. Carlo II died in October 1448 and was succeeded by his son Leonardo III Tocco. After the Ottoman conquest, the Tocco territories became a sanjak under the name of "Karlı İli", derived from Carlo II.

== Family ==
By his marriage to Ramondina of Ventimiglia, Carlo II Tocco had four children:

- Leonardo III Tocco, who succeeded as ruler of Epirus
- Giovanni Tocco
- Antonio Tocco
- Elvira Tocco

He married a daughter of Maurice Spata sometime after 1415.

== Sources ==
- Fine, John V. A. (1994) [1987]. The Late Medieval Balkans: A Critical Survey from the Late Twelfth Century to the Ottoman Conquest. Ann Arbor, Michigan: University of Michigan Press. ISBN 978-0-472-10079-8.
- Kazhdan, Alexander, ed. (1991). The Oxford Dictionary of Byzantium. Oxford and New York: Oxford University Press. ISBN 0-19-504652-8.
- Miller, William (1908). The Latins in the Levant: A History of Frankish Greece (1204–1566). London: John Murray.
- Nicol, Donald M. (1984). The Despotate of Epiros, 1267–1479: A Contribution to the History of Greece in the Middle Ages. Cambridge: Cambridge University Press. ISBN 978-0-521-13089-9.
- Soulis, George Christos (1984), The Serbs and Byzantium during the reign of Tsar Stephen Dušan (1331–1355) and his successors, Dumbarton Oaks, ISBN 0-88402-137-8
- Trapp, Erich; Beyer, Hans-Veit; Walther, Rainer; Sturm-Schnabl, Katja; Kislinger, Ewald; Leontiadis, Ioannis; Kaplaneres, Sokrates (1976–1996). Prosopographisches Lexikon der Palaiologenzeit (in German). Vienna: Verlag der Österreichischen Akademie der Wissenschaften. ISBN 3-7001-3003-1.
- Zečević, Nada (2014). The Tocco of the Greek Realm: Nobility, Power and Migration in Latin Greece (14th-15th centuries). Belgrade: Makart. ISBN 9788691944100.

Preceded by Carlo I	Ruler of Epirus; 1429–1448	Succeeded by Leonardo
