= Chronicle of the Tocco =

Literary work

Carlo I Tocco's territorial expansion on the Greek mainland

The Chronicle of the Tocco (Greek: Χρονικό των Τόκκων) is a chronicle in fifteen-syllable blank verse written in medieval Greek. It covers the period of 1375-1425 and focuses on the ascent of the Tocco family, and especially Carlo I Tocco, Count palatine of Cephalonia and Zakynthos, to the rule over the Despotate of Epirus, as well as Carlo's conquest of territories in the Morea.

The anonymous author described events that occurred during his own lifetime and must have been present at some of them. He possibly belonged to the court of Carlo I Tocco and came from Ioannina. From the text we can deduce that he was not particularly educated since he was using the vernacular Greek language.

The author describes the Toccos as fair governors who care for the rights of their people. It is remarkable that he does not mention the Latin descent of the noble family. He appears to cultivate a sense of early Greek nationalism and of xenophobia towards the Albanian tribes.

The Chronicle was published for the first time in 1975 by Giuseppe Schirò (junior) (Cronaca dei Tocco di Cefalonia; prolegomeni, testo critico e traduzione, Corpus Fontium Historiae Byzantinae 10. Rome: Accademia nazionale dei Lincei, 1975). It comprises 3923 verses and was found in the codex Vaticanus Graecus 1831. The beginning and the end of the text are missing. This codex was written before June 1429, possibly by the author, as G. Schirò believed. There is also a 16th-century copy of it, codex Vatic. gr. 2214. Elisabeth Zachariadou proved that the first pages of the codex were placed in a wrong order and suggested a different order for the first 1,000 verses, which makes the text more coherent and easier to understand.

The Chronicle, despite its unimportant literary quality, has significant value as an historical source, as well as a linguistic source for medieval Greek.
