= Leonardo I Tocco =

Arms of Leonardo I Tocco as Count Palatine of Cephalonia and Zakynthos: the Tocco arms with Anjou-Taranto in canton

Leonardo I Tocco (died 1375/1377) was the count palatine of the islands of Cephalonia and Zakynthos from 1357 until his death, and later lord of Ithaca, Lefkada, and the port of Vonitsa as well.

He was the son of Guglielmo Tocco, the Angevin governor of Corfu in the 1330s, and his second wife Margaret Orsini, the daughter of John I Orsini, Count palatine of Cephalonia.

Through his father, Leonardo was closely connected to the Angevin dynasty, and in particular Robert of Taranto. Leonardo was one of the witnesses to his marriage, and later was instrumental in securing Robert's release from captivity in Hungary in 1352. As a reward, in 1357, Robert named him Count palatine of Cephalonia, Zakynthos and possibly Ithaca as well. Probably by ca. 1362, and certainly before 1373, Leonardo also succeeded in gaining control over Lefkada and the port of Vonitsa on the Epirote mainland. In 1374, following the death of Philip II of Taranto, he was part of a delegation which went to Naples and offered the Principality of Achaea to Queen Joan I of Naples. He died sometime between March 1375 and August 1377.

Leonardo was married to Maddalena Buondelmonti, a niece of the powerful Niccolò Acciaioli. By her he had five children:

- Petronilla (died 1409/1410), married Niccolò III dalle Carceri, Duke of Naxos (died 1383) and then Nicola Venier, the Venetian bailli of Negroponte
- Giovanna, married Enrico di Ventimiglia, Count of Geraci
- Susanna, married Nicola Ruffo, Count of Cantanzaro, Viceroy of Calabria, Marquess of Cotrone
- Carlo I Tocco (died 1429), Leonardo's successor as count palatine, he eventually became Despot of Epirus as well
- Leonardo II Tocco (died 1418/19), lord of Zakynthos, governor of Corinth, lord of Glarentza and Angelokastron

== Notes ==
Preceded by Robert of Taranto	Count palatine of Cephalonia; 1357 – 1375/77	Succeeded by Carlo I Tocco
