= Thomas I Komnenos Doukas =

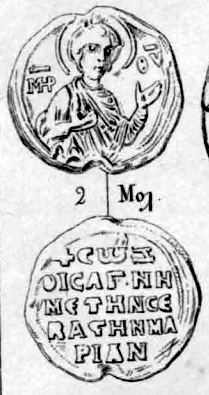
- Lead seal of Thomas

Despot of Epirus
- Reign: 1297–1318
- Predecessor: Nikephoros I Komnenos Doukas
- Successor: Nicholas Orsini
- Born: c. 1285
- Died: 1318
- Dynasty: Komnenos Doukas
- Father: Nikephoros I
- Mother: Anna Palaiologina Kantakouzene

Thomas I Komnenos Doukas (Latinized as Comnenus Ducas) (Greek: Θωμάς Α΄ Κομνηνός Δούκας, romanized: Thōmas I Komnēnos Doukas) (c. 1285–1318) ruler of Epirus from c. 1297 until his death in 1318.

Thomas was the son of Nikephoros I Komnenos Doukas and Anna Palaiologina Kantakouzene, a niece of Emperor Michael VIII Palaiologos. In 1290 he was conferred the court dignity of despotes by his mother's cousin, Emperor Andronikos II Palaiologos. Thomas' succession to his father's principality was endangered by the marriage of his sister Thamar Angelina Komnene to Philip I of Taranto, a son of King Charles II of Naples and Maria of Hungary in 1294. Although Philip had been promised to inherit Epirus in his wife's right, when Nikephoros died between September 1296 and July 1298, Anna secured the succession of her son Thomas and assumed the regency.

This isolated Epirus from its strongest ally and left it practically without outside support. Charles II of Naples demanded that Epirus be turned over to Philip and Thamar, but Anna refused, claiming that the arrangement had been broken when Thamar had been forced to abandon her Orthodox faith. To remedy this, Anna arranged for an alliance with the Byzantine Empire and the marriage of young Thomas to Anna Palaiologina, the daughter of the co-Emperor Michael IX Palaiologos. The actual marriage took place in 1307 or 1313. In the meantime Charles II sent troops into Epirus, but they were repulsed and the Epirotes advanced into the Angevin lands in the western Balkans, recovering Butrinto and Naupaktos in 1304–1305. A new Angevin invasion in 1307 ended with a compromise by which Philip of Taranto was ceded many of the fortresses that had been retaken by the Epirotes in the previous war.

Epirus gravitated increasingly into the Byzantine orbit until a private dispute between Epirote and Byzantine commanders sparked off a new conflict in 1315. The Byzantines raided as far as Arta, and Thomas imprisoned his wife and entered into negotiations with Philip of Taranto. But before Epirus could enter into a new alliance with the Angevins he was murdered by his nephew, Count Nicholas Orsini, Count of Cephalonia.

Preceded by Nikephoros I	Despot of Epirus; 1297–1318	Succeeded by Nicholas
