= Leonardo II Tocco =

Leonardo II Tocco (1375/76 – 1418/19) was a scion of the Tocco family and lord of Zakynthos, who played an important role as a military leader for his brother, Carlo I Tocco, in early 15th-century western Greece.

== Biography ==
Leonardo was the second son and youngest child of Leonardo I Tocco, the Count palatine of the islands of Cephalonia and Zakynthos and lord of Ithaca and Leucas, and his wife, Maddalena dei Buondelmonti. His older siblings were Carlo I Tocco and Petronila, wife of Nicola Venier, the Venetian bailli of Negroponte.

Leonardo's father died while he was still an infant, and for the next few years, his mother acted as regent for both her sons. His brother Carlo I gave the island of Zakynthos to him as an appanage in 1399, and Leonardo also received lands in the Principality of Achaea by Prince Pedro de San Superano. Little is known of him otherwise until ca. 1404–1406, when he took part in Carlo's attacks on the Epirote mainland around Arta. Leonardo's and Carlo's exploits over the next decades are the main subject of the Chronicle of the Tocco. In 1407, Leonardo attacked the new Prince of Achaea, Centurione II Zaccaria, who had seized his fiefs in the Morea in 1404, and conquered Glarentza, the principality's main town.

In 1411 Carlo took possession of Ioannina in Epirus following the death of the Despot of Epirus Esau de' Buondelmonti; Leonardo too joined his brother there, and in the same summer he conquered and razed the Albanian-held fortress of Lachanokastron. In the next year, however, he was defeated by the Albanians at Kranea near Mesopotamon. In 1413, warfare between the Tocchi and Centurione Zaccaria resumed, and this time the latter prevailed. Leonardo campaigned against Zaccaria in 1413, but in summer 1414, he was sent by Carlo to Corinth, where the Byzantine emperor Manuel II Palaiologos supervised repairs to the Hexamilion wall. The emperor awarded Leonardo with the high court dignity of megas konostaulos, but enjoined both brothers to seek peace with Zaccaria. The brothers appealed to Venice, and with her mediation concluded three-year truce was agreed which left Glarentza once again under Achaean control.

Carlo now appointed his brother as governor over the Tocco-ruled islands as well as Acarnania with Vonitsa. On 4 October 1416, Leonardo conquered the town of Rogoi. This was followed soon after by the capture of Arta by his brother, and Leonardo was appointed the city's governor. In 1418, he fought against the attacks of the Ottoman Turks, and visited King Ladislaus of Naples. He died soon after at Zakynthos.

== Family ==
The name and identity of Leonardo's wife is unknown, but he had several children:

- Carlo II Tocco, married Ramondina of Ventimiglia and daughter of Muriq Shpata, succeeded his uncle Carlo I
- Creusa Tocco, who in 1429 married the Despot of the Morea (and future last Byzantine emperor), Constantine XI Palaiologos
- Angelica Tocco, who married Giacomo de Ariano
- Magdalene Tocco, who married John Asen Zaccaria.

== Sources ==
- Fine, John V. A. (1994) [1987]. The Late Medieval Balkans: A Critical Survey from the Late Twelfth Century to the Ottoman Conquest. Ann Arbor, Michigan: University of Michigan Press. ISBN 978-0-472-10079-8.
- Setton, Kenneth M.; Hazard, Harry W., eds. (1975). A History of the Crusades, Volume III: The Fourteenth and Fifteenth Centuries. Vol. 3. Madison and London: University of Wisconsin Press. ISBN 0-299-06670-3.
- Talbot, Alice-Mary (1991). "Tocco". In Kazhdan, Alexander (ed.). The Oxford Dictionary of Byzantium. Oxford and New York: Oxford University Press. pp. 2090–2091. ISBN 0-19-504652-8.
- Trapp, Erich; Beyer, Hans-Veit; Kaplaneres, Sokrates; Leontiadis, Ioannis (1994). "29008. Τόκκω, Λεονάρδος ΙΙ. Κατακουζηνᾶτος δὲ". Prosopographisches Lexikon der Palaiologenzeit (in German). Vol. 12. Vienna: Verlag der Österreichischen Akademie der Wissenschaften. ISBN 3-7001-3003-1.
- Zečević, Nada (2014). The Tocco of the Greek Realm: Nobility, Power and Migration in Latin Greece (14th-15th centuries). Belgrade: Makart. ISBN 978-86-919441-0-0.
