= Anna Palaiologina (daughter of Michael IX) =

Princess

- Died: 1320
- Spouse: Thomas I Komnenos Doukas; Nicholas Orsini
- Greek: Ἅννα Παλαιολογίνα
- Dynasty: Palaiologos
- Father: Michael IX Palaiologos
- Mother: Rita of Armenia

Anna Palaiologina (died 1320; Greek: Ἅννα Παλαιολογίνα) was a Byzantine princess and queen-consort (basilissa) of the Despotate of Epirus.

She was a daughter of the Byzantine co-emperor Michael IX Palaiologos and his wife, Rita of Armenia. In 1304, her hand was sought by the Epirote regent, Anna Palaiologina Kantakouzene, for her son Thomas I Komnenos Doukas. The marriage eventually took place in ca. 1307, bringing Epirus closer to the rulers of Constantinople. At that time, the rulers of Epirus were politically vulnerable, following their refusal to obey imperial authority.

Some sources intimate that Thomas I Komnenos Doukas did not treat Anna well. In 1318 Thomas was killed by his nephew, Nicholas Orsini, count of Cephalonia, who seized control of Epirus. Orsini then took Anna as his wife, despite her technically now being his aunt. There is speculation that she may have greeted her first husband's death with joy, or even have supported it. She died in 1320. In 1323, Nicholas Orsini was murdered by his brother, John II Orsini.

== Sources ==
- Trapp, Erich; Beyer, Hans-Veit (2001). Prosopographisches Lexikon der Palaiologenzeit (in German). Vol. I, 1–12, Add. 1–2, CD-ROM Version. Vienna: Verlag der Österreichischen Akademie der Wissenschaften. ISBN 978-3-7001-3003-1.
