= Matthew Orsini =

Count palatine of Cephalonia and Zakynthos

Matthew or Maio Orsini (Italian: Matteo Orsini; died after January 1238) or alternatively Matthew/Maio de Monopoli was a Count palatine of Cephalonia and Zakynthos.

== Life ==
Matthew's origin is obscure. Following the—mostly conjectured—genealogy presented by the 19th-century scholar Karl Hopf, he has generally been considered in older historiography to be a scion of the noble Roman House of Orsini, the son of a certain Richard Orsini and a daughter of admiral Margaritus of Brindisi, who had conquered the Byzantine islands of Cephalonia, Zakynthos, and Ithaca during the Third Norman invasion of the Balkans in 1185. Other scholars on the other hand have considered him Margaritus' son-in-law. In both cases, it is considered that he succeeded Margaritus in his rule over Cephalonia, Zakynthos, and Ithaca, following the latter's disgrace in 1194. Like Margaritus, Matthew acknowledged the suzerainty of the Norman Kings of Sicily.

More recent research has cast doubt on this traditional account: Matthew was most likely from Monopoli in Apulia, and appears to have been unrelated to Margaritus. Even his supposed surname, Orsini, is not attested in any primary sources, either for himself or any of his descendants, and modern historians have denied it's historicity, viewing it as pure conjecture on Hopf's part. The Aragonese version of the Chronicle of the Morea offers an alternative background, reporting that Maio was a simple (but respected amongst his peers) swine herder who, after a clash with local authorities, had been expelled from Monopoli and fled to Cephalonia with his followers, where he married the daughter of the local Byzantine governor before extending his rule over the neighbouring islands. While previous scholars dismissed this version, it may have been closer to reality according to the historian Andreas Kiesewetter, while it is also partially confirmed by another source, the Breve Chronicon de Rebus Siculis, where Matthew is mentioned as "Apulus, de civitate Monopoli". As historian Brendan Oswald has also pointed out, this ignoble origin for Matthew and his dynasty might also explain the lack of a family name in sources, and their mention simply with their title, as "de Cefalonia".

Kiesewetter suggests that Matthew became master of the islands as late as 1206, following the collapse of the Byzantine Empire due to the Fourth Crusade in 1204. Following the partition of the Byzantine Empire by the participants of the Fourth Crusade in 1204, the Ionian Islands, including those ruled by Matthew, were actually assigned to the Republic of Venice. In 1205, Venice proceeded to occupy Corfu, the largest of the Ionian Islands, which was ruled by the Genoese pirate Leone Vetrano. To insure himself against a similar fate, in 1207 Matthew placed himself and his domains under the authority of Pope Innocent III. Two years later, however, Matthew accommodated himself with Venice, acknowledging the Republic's suzerainty. However, this information is reported by Venetian chroniclers of the 14th and 15th centuries, so that its veracity is unverifiable; at any rate, as Kiesewetter notes, the Venetian loss of Corfu in 1210 would have made any Venetian connection less attractive to Matthew. Indeed, it appears that during the same period he placed himself under the suzerainty of the Latin Empire of Constantinople. After the death of Emperor Henry of Flanders in 1216, he sought protection from the Pope, while at the same time seeking close relations with Theodore Komnenos Doukas, the neighbouring Greek ruler of the Epirote mainland. These ties between the two were strengthened by the marriage of Matthew to a sister of Theodore in 1227.

Following the defeat of Theodore at Klokotnitsa in 1230, which spelled an end to his imperial ambitions, in 1236 Matthew became a vassal of the Principality of Achaea instead.

The last record of Matthew is a letter sent to him by Pope Gregory IX in January 1238, exhorting him to come to the defence of Constantinople against the Greeks of the Empire of Nicaea. Count Richard Orsini is often considered his son and successor, but this is problematic for chronological reasons. It is likely that Matthew was succeeded by another person, possibly named Theodore, who would then be the father of Richard.

== Bibliography ==
- Kiesewetter, Andreas (2006). "Preludio alla Quarta Crociata? Megareites di Brindisi, Maio di Cefalonia e la signoria sulle isole ionie (1185-1250)". In Gherardo Ortalli; Giorgio Ravegnani; Peter Schreiner (eds.). Quarta Crociata. Venezia - Bisanzio - Impero latino. Atti delle giornate di studio. Venezia, 4-8 maggio 2004 (in Italian). Venice: Istituto veneto di scienze, lettere ed arti. pp. 317–358. ISBN 8888143742.
- Miller, William (1908). The Latins in the Levant: A History of Frankish Greece (1204–1566). London: John Murray.
- Setton, Kenneth M. (1976). The Papacy and the Levant (1204–1571), Volume I: The Thirteenth and Fourteenth Centuries. Vol. 1. Philadelphia: The American Philosophical Society. ISBN 0-87169-114-0.

Preceded by Margaritus of Brindisi (?)	Count palatine of Cephalonia and Zakynthos before 1206 (1194?) – after 1238	Unknown Title next held by Richard Orsini
