= Filotheos Theodoropoulos =

Greek Orthodox bishop

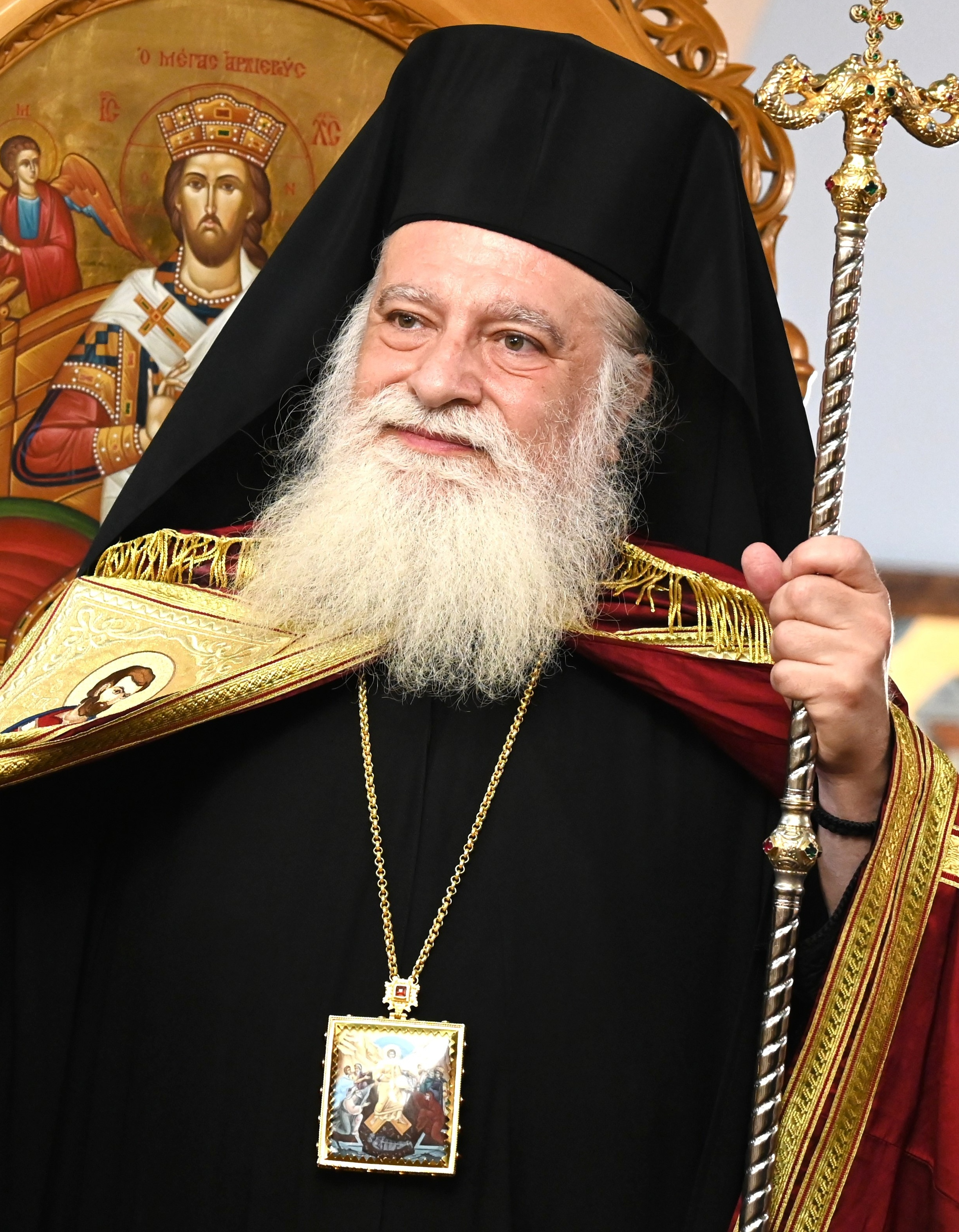
Filotheos Theodoropoulos, 2020

Filotheos Theodoropoulos (Greek: Φιλόθεος Θεοδώροπουλος) born Dimitrios Theodoropoulos (Greek: Δημήτριος Θεοδώροπουλος) (1963 in Kato Nevrokopi) is, since 2019, the Bishop of Rogoi, assistant bishop of the Archbishopric of Athens.
