= Guglielmo Tocco =

Guglielmo Tocco (died in Naples, 22 September 1335) was the governor of the Greek island of Corfu in the 1330s and the founder of the Tocco dynasty.

Guglielmo was born the son of Pietro Tocco, a notary in Melfi, in the Angevin Kingdom of Naples. In 1330/1 he was named governor of Corfu by Philip I of Taranto.

He was married twice. By his first marriage to Giovanna Torelli he had one son, Pietro Tocco, seneschal of Robert of Taranto and Count of Martina Franca. By his second marriage, to Margaret Orsini, the daughter of John I Orsini, Count palatine of Cephalonia, he had four children:

- Leonardo I Tocco (died 1375/1377), who became Count palatine of Cephalonia and Zakynthos in 1357, beginning the Tocco line that ruled over the Ionian Islands and eventually Epirus
- Nicoletto Tocco (died 1347/1354), who became a monk
- Lisulo or Ludovico Tocco (died 1360), seneschal of Robert of Taranto in 1354
- Margherita Tocco, who became nun at Naples

== Sources ==
- Fine, John Van Antwerp Jr. (1994) [1987]. The Late Medieval Balkans: A Critical Survey from the Late Twelfth Century to the Ottoman Conquest. Ann Arbor, Michigan: University of Michigan Press. ISBN 0472082604.
- Kazhdan, Alexander, ed. (1991). Oxford Dictionary of Byzantium. Oxford University Press. ISBN 978-0-19-504652-6.
- Zečević, Nada (2014). The Tocco of the Greek Realm: Nobility, Power and Migration in Latin Greece (14th-15th centuries). Belgrade: Makart. ISBN 9788691944100.
