= County Palatine of Cephalonia and Zakynthos =

Former country

Coordinates: 38.0086°N 20.6570°E

County Palatine of Cephalonia and Zakynthos Παλατινή Κομητεία της Κεφαλονιάς και της Ζακύνθου (Greek) Palatiní Komiteía tis Kefaloniás kai tis Zakýnthou
- Vassal state of various countries, de facto autonomous
- 1185–1479
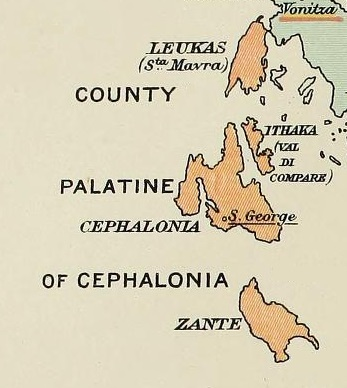
- County Palatine of Cephalonia and Zakynthos
- Capital: Castle of Saint George (near Peratata)
- Government
  - Type: County palatine
- Count palatine
  - 1185–1195: Margaritus of Brindisi
  - 1448–1479: Leonardo III Tocco
- Historical era: Middle Ages
  - Established: 1185
  - Divided by the Ottoman Empire and the Republic of Venice: 1479
Preceded by	Succeeded by
Byzantine Empire	Venetian rule in the Ionian Islands; Ottoman Empire
- Today part of: Greece

The County Palatine of Cephalonia and Zakynthos existed from 1185 to 1479 as part of the Kingdom of Sicily. The title and the right to rule the Ionian islands of Cephalonia and Zakynthos was originally given to Margaritus of Brindisi for his services to William II, King of Sicily, in 1185.

Following Margaritus, the county passed on to a branch of the Orsini family until 1325, when it passed briefly to Angevins and then, from 1357, to the Tocco family. The Tocco used the county as a springboard for their acquisition of lands in the Greek mainland, and were successful in gaining control over the Despotate of Epirus in 1411. However, facing the advance of the Ottoman Turks they successively lost their mainland territories and were once again reduced to the County Palatine, which they held until 1479, when it was divided between Venice and the Ottomans. Zakynthos was put under the direct rule of Venice.

== History ==
The beginning of the Frankish conquest in the islands of Cephalonia, Zakynthos and Ithaca was linked with the pirate and admiral of the Sicilian fleet Margaritus of Brindisi, known to the chroniclers of the late 12th century. He developed significant activity as the privateer of William II, Norman King of Sicily. In Latin documents of 1192 and 1193, he signed in Greek as Μαργαρίτος Βρεντεσίνος αμιράς κόμης Μελιτήιος (Margaritus Admiral, Count of Malta). Irrespective of Margaritus’ unclear descent, it is certain that William, after the Norman invasion of 1185 against the Byzantine provinces, granted him the new Norman acquisitions in the Ionian Sea, in exchange for the services he had offered to the Norman.

Ten years later, in 1195, Matthew or Maio Orsini, who is generally considered a scion of the noble Roman Orsini family, succeeded Margaritus as the ruler of the Ionian Islands. In order to secure his position, Matthew recognized the dominion of Venice in 1209 and of the Pope in 1216 and later of the Principality of Achaea in 1236. During that same period the Orthodox bishopric of the islands was abolished, the Episcopal thrones were occupied by Latins and the feudal system was put into force. The successor of Matthew, Richard, the "most noble count of the palace and lord of Cephalonia, Zakynthos and Ithaca", authenticated in 1264 the estates of the Latin bishopric of Cephalonia. During the reign of the latter Frankish ruler, Ithaca had become a refuge for pirates.

The Orsini family did not only rule the Ionian Islands but also conquered Epirus in early 14th century, thus acquiring the title of 'the despot' as well. Certain members of the family embraced the Orthodox dogma and married Greek women. After the death of John II Orsini in 1335, the islands were occupied by the Anjou, who, as rulers of Achaea, had the islands under their suzerainty until then.

The Angevin occupation lasted until 1357, when the said Greek territory was ceded to the Italian family of the Tocchi, who remained in power for over a century and secured unity in the governance of those three Ionian Islands. In 1357, Robert of Taranto ceded Cephalonia, Zakynthos and Ithaca to the governor of Corfu, Leonardo I Tocco, as reward for the services he had provided when he was a captive of the King of Hungary.

After the expansion of his dominion to Leukas, Leonardo I Tocco attempted to reinforce his position by entering into family relations with the powerful Florentine family of the Acciaiuoli.

This policy gave the family of the Tocchi increased power, which reached its peak during the 15th century with its expansion to the continental coast, after Carlo I Tocco conquered Ioannina (1411) and Arta (1416). He received the title of despot by the Byzantine emperor Manuel II Palaiologos and maintained the Byzantine tradition. Seated in the islands of the Ionian Sea or in the acquisitions in Central Greece, the dynasty of the Tocchi attempted to win over the populations by ceding to the seigneurs, according to the Chronicle of the Tocco, "inheritances", "estates", "kratimata" and "pronoias". An example of this is the family Galati, who received privileges and estates from the Tocco on the island of Ithaca. Following an analogous policy on the religious front, Leonardo III (1448–1479), the last of the Tocchi dynasty, reinstated the Orthodox episcopal throne of Cephalonia that had been abolished by the Orsini.

Venice was not pleased with the increased influence of the Tocchi. The downfall of the duchy of the Tocchi by the Turks (1479) gave the opportunity to the Serenissima to intervene resolutely in the Ionian Sea and succeeded, through the treaty of 1484, in annexing Zakynthos and, in 1500, Cephalonia and Ithaca.

== Counts Palatine of Cephalonia and Zakynthos ==
- Margaritus of Brindisi

=== Orsini family ===
- Matthew Orsini, 1195 – after 1238
- Theodore, after 1238-c.a. 1260
- Richard Orsini, c.a. 1260 – 1304
- John I Orsini, 1304–1317
- Nicholas Orsini, 1317–1323
- John II Orsini, 1323–1325

=== Angevins ===
- John of Gravina, 1325–1336
- Robert of Taranto, 1336–1357

=== House of Tocco ===
Coat of arms of the Tocco as counts palatine of Cephalonia (left) and rulers of Epirus (right)

- Leonardo I Tocco, 1357–1376
- Charles I Tocco, 1376–1429
- Charles II Tocco, 1429–1448
- Leonardo III Tocco, 1448–1479

== Sources ==
- Kazhdan, Alexander, ed. (1991). The Oxford Dictionary of Byzantium. Oxford and New York: Oxford University Press. ISBN 0-19-504652-8.
- Kiesewetter, Andreas (2006). "Preludio alla Quarta Crociata? Megareites di Brindisi, Maio di Cefalonia e la signoria sulle isole ionie (1185-1250)". In Gherardo Ortalli; Giorgio Ravegnani; Peter Schreiner (eds.). Quarta Crociata. Venezia - Bisanzio - Impero latino. Atti delle giornate di studio. Venezia, 4-8 maggio 2004 (in Italian). Venice: Istituto veneto di scienze, lettere ed arti. ISBN 8888143742.
- Miller, William (1908). The Latins in the Levant: A History of Frankish Greece (1204–1566). London: John Murray.
- Miller, William (1921). Essays on the Latin Orient. Cambridge: Cambridge University Press.
- Nicol, Donald MacGillivray (2010). The Despotate of Epiros 1267–1479: A Contribution to the History of Greece in the Middle Ages. Cambridge University Press. ISBN 978-0-521-13089-9.
- Polemis, Demetrios I. (1968). The Doukai: A Contribution to Byzantine Prosopography. London: The Athlone Press.
- Setton, Kenneth M. (1978). The Papacy and the Levant (1204–1571), Volume II: The Fifteenth Century. Vol. 2. Philadelphia: The American Philosophical Society. ISBN 0-87169-127-2.
- Soustal, Peter; Koder, Johannes (1981). Tabula Imperii Byzantini, Band 3: Nikopolis und Kephallēnia (in German). Vienna: Verlag der Österreichischen Akademie der Wissenschaften. ISBN 978-3-7001-0399-8.
- Zečević, Nada (2014). The Tocco of the Greek Realm: Nobility, Power and Migration in Latin Greece (14th – 15th Centuries). Belgrade: Makart. ISBN 978-8687115118.
