= Pietrina Francone =

15th-century Italian noblewoman

- Princess of Arianiti

Princess consort of Arianiti
- Tenure: c. 1440s – 1462
- Predecessor: Maria Muzaka
- Successor: Francesca of Montferrat
- Born: Unknown
- Died: c. 15th-16th century
- Spouse: Gjergj Arianiti
- Issue: Theodora Arianiti; Maria Arianiti; Thomas Comnino Arianiti; Constantine Arianiti, Prince of Macedonia; Arianitto Arianiti
- House: Francone (by birth); Arianiti (by marriage)
- Father: Oliviero Francone
- Religion: Roman Catholic

Pietrina Francone was a 15th-century Italian noblewoman from the Francone family in Apulia. Her father was Oliviero Francone, an Aragonese officer in Lecce. Through her marriage to Albanian Prince Regnant Gjergj Arianiti, she became the Princess Consort of the Arianiti Principality.

== Issue ==
With her husband Gjergj Arianiti, she had the following children:

  - Maria Arianiti, married to Bartolomeo Giuppo della Rovere (1474–1545) from the Geonese noble Della Rovere family. They had a son, Francesco della Rovere, who initially became Bishop of Camerino (1508), Voltera (1514) and finally Archbishop of Benevento (1530–1545).
  - Theodora Arianiti
  - Thomas Arianiti
  - Constantine Arianiti, who became a leader among Christian Balkan refugees in Italy and used the titles Prince of Macedonia, Duke of Achea and Despot of Morea. In the early 16th century, Constantine served as a diplomat to the popes and the future Maximilian I, Holy Roman Emperor, with both parties finding him a talented ambassador. In 1489 he married Lady Francesca of Montferrat, member of the Palaeologus-Montferrat family, branch of the Byzantine Imperial Palaiologos dynasty, and a step-daughter to his niece Maria of Serbia. From 1495 to 1499 he became regent of Montferrat, on behalf of the young William IX, his brother-in law and grand-nephew. With Francesca, Constantine had the following children:
    - Arianitto, Prince of Macedonia
    - Andronica, married to Carlo III Tocco then after his death to Giorgio Secco, a milanese nobleman.
    - Penthesilea, married to Alexander Ducagjini
    - Ippolita, married to Zanobio de' Medici of the Italian Medici family. She remarried in 1532 to Lionello Pio di Carpi of the Pio di Savoia family.
    - Polissena, married Rinaldo degli Ottoni di Matelica.
    - Deianira, married Giorgio Trivulzio.
    - Elena, married Juan de Luna, a Castilian nobleman.
  - Lord Arianitto Arianiti
