= Angelo Cesi (bishop of Rimini) =

Italian Roman catholic priest, bishop of Rimini (1592–1646)

Most Reverend Angelo Cesi
- Bishop of Rimini; Apostolic Nuncio to Venice
- Church: Catholic Church
- Diocese: Diocese of Rimini
- In office: 1627–1646
- Predecessor: Cipriano Pavoni
- Successor: Federico Sforza

Orders
- Consecration: 1 August 1627 by Luigi Caetani

Personal details
- Born: 19 November 1592 Rome, Italy
- Died: 20 September 1646 (age 53) Rimini, Italy

Angelo Cesi (19 November 1592 – 20 September 1646) was a Roman Catholic prelate who served as Bishop of Rimini (1627–1646) and Apostolic Nuncio to Venice (1645–1646).

== Biography ==
Angelo Cesi was born in Rome, Italy on 19 November 1592. On 19 July 1627, he was appointed during the papacy of Pope Urban VIII as Bishop of Rimini. On 1 August 1627, he was consecrated bishop by Luigi Caetani, Cardinal-Priest of Santa Pudenziana, Giuseppe Acquaviva, Titular Archbishop of Thebae, and Pietro Francesco Montorio, Bishop Emeritus of Nicastro, serving as co-consecrators. On 2 March 1645, he was appointed during the papacy of Pope Innocent X as Apostolic Nuncio to Venice. He served as Bishop of Rimini and Apostolic Nuncio to Venice until his death on 20 September 1646.

== Episcopal succession ==
While bishop, he was the principal co-consecrator of:

- Alfonso Pandolfi, Bishop of Comacchio (1631);
- Alessandro Deti, Bishop of Anglona-Tursi (1632);
- Lorenzo Gavotti, Bishop of Ventimiglia (1633);
- Joseph-Marie de Suarès, Bishop of Vaison (1633);
- Niccolò Sacchetti, Bishop of Volterra (1634);
- Giulio Diotallevi, Bishop of Strongoli (1637);
- Attilio Orsini, Bishop of Montepeloso (1638); and
- Antonio del Pezzo, Bishop of Polignano (1638).

== See also ==
- Catholic Church in Italy

== External links and additional sources ==
- Cheney, David M. "Diocese of Rimini". Catholic-Hierarchy.org. (for Chronology of Bishops) ^{[self-published]}
- Chow, Gabriel. "Diocese of Rimini (Italy)". GCatholic.org. (for Chronology of Bishops) ^{[self-published]}
- Cheney, David M. "Nunciature to Venice". Catholic-Hierarchy.org. (for Chronology of Bishops) ^{[self-published]}

Catholic Church titles
| Preceded by Francesco Vitelli | Apostolic Nuncio to Venice; 1645–1646 | Succeeded by Scipione Pannocchieschi d'Elci |
| Preceded by Cipriano Pavoni | Bishop of Rimini; 1627–1646 | Succeeded by Federico Sforza |
