= Sirtori (surname) =

Sirtori is a surname. Notable people with the surname include:

- Giuseppe Sirtori (1813–1874), Italian soldier, patriot and politician
- Giovanni Matteo Sirtori (died 1545), Roman Catholic prelate who served as Bishop of Volterra

== See also ==
- Sirtori
- Italian destroyer Giuseppe Sirtori
