= Giugni =

Giugni is a surname. Notable persons with that name include:

- Heather Giugni, American filmmaker and politician
- Gino Giugni (1927–2009), Italian academic and politician
- Ugolino Giugni (died 1470), Roman Catholic prelate
