= Fernando Palaiologos =

Fernando
- Despot of the Morea (?)
- Born: 15th century
- Died: 16th century
- Dynasty: Palaiologos (?)
- Father: Andreas Palaiologos (?)

Don Fernando, full name perhaps Fernando Palaiologos, (Note: No contemporary source gives Fernando's last name. Given that he was described as the 'son of the Despot of the Morea', a title held by the Palaiologos dynasty, he presumably used the last name Palaiologos, rendered as Paleologo in Italian) was a 15th and 16th-century nobleman of Greek descent who lived in Italy. Fernando is known only from a 1499 letter that mentions a mission "to the Turk" and that Fernando was "son of the Despot of the Morea". Fernando's identity is otherwise unclear; he might have been a son of Andreas Palaiologos, who claimed that position in 1499.

== Biography ==
Fernando is only attested on 17 July 1499, in a Venetian report that states that the Duke of Milan, Ludovico Sforza, reported that he had sent "Don Fernando, son of the Despot of the Morea, nephew of the lord Constantine, to the Turk with five horses". This appears to have been a diplomatic, or possible espionage, mission. Kenneth Setton believed in 1978 that "lord Costantine" was Constantine Arianiti, governor of Montferrat at the time. In 2013, Jonathan Harris instead suggested that Fernando was a (perhaps illegitimate) son of Andreas Palaiologos, the only claimant "Despot of the Morea" in 1499, and that "lord Constantine" was thus Constantine XI Palaiologos, Andreas's uncle.

Fernando's obscurity suggests that he made relatively little impact on history. Why is not clear, he may have been of illegitimate birth or was simply unwilling to play a more prominent role. Jonathan Harris claims that Fernando adopted the title of despot of the Morea after the death of Andreas Palaiologos in 1502, but provides no evidence for this claim. This title is alternatively attested to have been adopted after 1502 by the genealogically unconnected Constantine Arianiti.

== Possible other references ==
A letter from Antonio Giustiniani, Venetian ambassador to the Pope, mentions an unnamed 'despot' in command of a cavalry unit in October 1502. Jonathan Harris believes that this might be a reference to Constantine Arianiti rather than Fernando.

One of Andreas's successors as claimant to the position of despot, the name of whom is not mentioned in the sources, raised problems of protocol when he in 1518 invited Pope Leo X to become the godparent of his son Giovanni Martino Leonardo (Joannes Martinus Leonhardus as written in Latin) and invited ten cardinals to the baptism. According to the contemporary Papal master of ceremonies, Paris de Grassis, the honors asked for was as if the despot believed himself to be "baptizing the Emperor of Christendom himself". Kenneth Setton believed that this despot was Constantine Arianiti, a sentiment also held by Christian Gottfried Hoffmann, who included Paris de Grassis's account of the affair in his work Nova scriptorum ac monumentorum partim rarissimorum partim ineditorum, a collection of historical texts, in 1731. Identification with Constantine is problematic since contemporary sources otherwise hold that Constantine only had a single son, named Arianitto. Jonathan Harris believes that the 1518 despot could instead be Fernando. The territory claimed by the 1518 despot is not specified in de Grassis's material. There was another claimant despot active in Italy at the time, Carlo III Tocco, claimant despot of Epirus, who is attested to have had a son named Giovanni Leonardo, born at some point in the 1510s.
