= Orazio degli Albizzi =

Roman Catholic Bishop of Volterra (1655-1676)

Most Reverend Orazio degli Albizzi
- Bishop of Volterra
- Church: Catholic Church
- Diocese: Diocese of Volterra
- In office: 1655–1676
- Predecessor: Giovanni Gerini
- Successor: Carlo Filippo Sfondrati

Orders
- Consecration: 11 July 1655 by Francesco Maria Brancaccio

Personal details
- Born: 1610 Florence, Italy
- Died: 30 January 1676 (aged 65–66)

Orazio degli Albizzi (1610–1676) was a Roman Catholic prelate who served as Bishop of Volterra from 1655 until his death in 1676.

== Biography ==
Orazio degli Albizzi was born in Florence, Italy in 1610. On 5 July 1655, he was appointed the Bishop of Volterra during the papacy of Pope Alexander VII. On 11 July 1655, he was consecrated bishop by Francesco Maria Brancaccio, Bishop of Viterbo e Tuscania. He served as Bishop of Volterra until his death on 30 January 1676.

Catholic Church titles
Preceded by Giovanni Gerini	Bishop of Volterra; 1610–1676	Succeeded by Carlo Filippo Sfondrati
