= Benedetto Nerli =

Roman Catholic bishop

Most Reverend Benedetto Nerli
- Bishop of Volterra
- Church: Catholic Church
- Diocese: Diocese of Volterra
- In office: 1545–1565
- Predecessor: Giovanni Matteo Sirtori
- Successor: Alessandro Strozzi

Personal details
- Died: 1565 Volterra, Italy

Benedetto Nerli (died 1565) was a Roman Catholic prelate who served as Bishop of Volterra (1545–1565).

== Biography ==
On 22 June 1545, Benedetto Nerli was appointed during the papacy of Pope Paul III as Bishop of Volterra. He served as Bishop of Volterra until his death in 1565.

Catholic Church titles
Preceded by Giovanni Matteo Sirtori	Bishop of Volterra; 1545–1565	Succeeded by Alessandro Strozzi
