= Leonardo Salutati =

Bishop of Fiesole

Most Reverend Leonardo Salutati
- Bishop of Fiesole
- Church: Catholic Church
- Diocese: Diocese of Fiesole
- In office: 1450–1466
- Predecessor: Benozzo Federighi
- Successor: Antonio degli Agli

Personal details
- Died: 1450 Fiesole, Italy

Leonardo Salutati (died 1466) was a Roman Catholic prelate who served as Bishop of Fiesole (1450–1466).

== Biography ==
On 3 August 1450, Leonardo Salutati was appointed during the papacy of Pope Nicholas V as Bishop of Fiesole. He served as Bishop of Fiesole until his death in 1466.

Catholic Church titles
Preceded by Benozzo Federighi	Bishop of Fiesole; 1450–1466	Succeeded by Antonio degli Agli
