= Francesca of Montferrat =

15th-century Italian noblewoman

Francesca Palaeologus-Montferrat

Princess consort of Arianiti (in exile)
- Tenure: 1489 - 8 May 1530
- Predecessor: Pietrina Francone

Princess consort of Macedonia (titular)
- Tenure: c. 1494 - 8 May 1530

Duchess consort of Achaea (titular)
- Tenure: c. 1494 - 8 May 1530

Despotess consort of Morea (titular)
- Tenure: 1502/1507 - 8 May 1530
- Predecessor: Caterina Palaiologina
- Born: c. before 1486
- Died: c. after 1561
- Spouse: Constantine Arianiti
- Issue: Arianitto Arianiti; Andronica Arianiti, Despotess of Epirus; Penthesilea Arianiti; Ippolita Arianiti; Polissena Arianiti; Deianira Arianiti; Elena Arianiti
- House: Palaeologus-Montferrat (by birth); Arianiti (by marriage)
- Father: Boniface III, Marquis of Montferrat
- Religion: Roman Catholicism

Francesca of Montferrat was a noblewoman of the Palaeologus-Montferrat family, a cadet branch of the Byzantine Palaiologos dynasty. She married Costantino Arianiti Comneno of the Arianiti family.

== Life ==
Francesca Paleologa, Lady of Refrancore was an illegitimate daughter of Boniface III, Marquis of Montferrat.

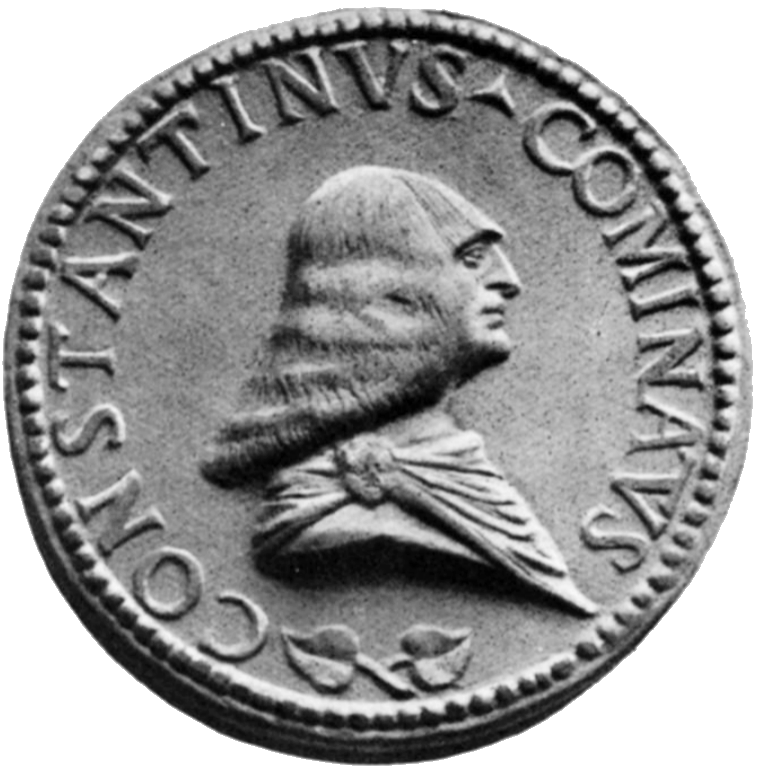
Constantine Arianiti

Sometime around 1489-1492, Francesca married the exiled Albanian prince Constantine Arianiti Komneni, son of prince and military leader Gjergj Arianiti and Pietrina Francone, an Italian noblewoman. Like most medieval Albanian nobility, the Arianitis were exiled to Italy after their territories, specifically the Principality of Arianiti, fell to the Ottomans. Her sister-in law Andronika Arianiti was the wife of Albania's national hero Skanderbeg.

Francesca's marriage to Constantine was likely arranged by her step-mother, Maria of Serbia, the groom's niece, the daughter of his elder sister Angelina Arianiti. Francesca brought a good dowry to the marriage, which enabled Constantine to be able to purchase some fiefs.

After the death of Francescas husband in 1531, she gained a position at the court of Christina of Denmark in Milan, as chief lady in waiting to the young duchess. Later, during Christina's second marriage, she was appointed as governess to the duchess' daughters, Renata and Dorothea.

Francescas appointment to this position was probably due to her husband's well-known loyalty to the pope, but also due to her daughter Deianira's husband, being a loyal subject to Francesco Sforza. Moreover, she was the paternal aunt of Margaret Paleologa, the Marquise regnant of Montferrat.

After retiring from her position in the retinue of the duchess and returning to Italy, Francesca was given 4000 scudi by Charles III, Duke of Lorraine, Christina's son.

== Death ==
Francesca died sometime after 1561.

== Family ==
Francesca of Montferrat had seven children with Constantine Arianiti.

  - Arianitto: served as captain in the army of the Papal States, until his death in 16 November 1551. Arianitto had only one daughter, therefore, his death ended the male line of the Arianiti family in Italy.
  - Andronica, the eldest daughter, named after her paternal aunt Andronika, Queen of Albania. She married Carlo III Tocco, the claimant Despot of Epirus and Count Palatine of Cephalonia and Zakynthos. Through their son Leonardo IV Tocco she was ancestral to the later members of the Tocco family. After Carlo III's death, Andronica married Milanese nobleman Giorgio Secco.
  - Penthesilea, married Alexander Dukagjini of the noble Albanian Dukagjini family.
  - Ippolita, married Zanobio de' Medici of the Italian Medici family. Remarried in 1532 to Lionello Pio di Carpi of the Pio di Savoia family.
  - Polissena, married Rinaldo degli Ottoni di Matelica of the Ottoni family.
  - Deianira, married Giorgio Trivulzio of the Trivulzio family.
  - Elena, married Juan de Luna, a castellan in Milan.
