= Alessandro Strozzi (bishop of Volterra) =

Most Reverend Alessandro Strozzi
- Bishop of Volterra
- Church: Catholic Church
- Diocese: Diocese of Volterra
- In office: 1566–1568
- Predecessor: Benedetto Nerli
- Successor: Ludovico Antinori

Orders
- Consecration: 28 April 1566 by Matteo Concini

Personal details
- Died: 4 April 1568 Volterra, Italy

Alessandro Strozzi (died 1568) was a Roman Catholic prelate who served as Bishop of Volterra (1566–1568).

== Biography ==
On 3 April 1566, Alessandro Strozzi was appointed during the papacy of Pope Pius V as Bishop of Volterra. On 28 April 1566, he was consecrated bishop by Matteo Concini, Bishop Emeritus of Cortona, with Alfonso Tornabuoni, Bishop Emeritus of Sansepolcro, and Lodovico Ardinghelli, Bishop of Fossombrone, serving as co-consecrators. He served as Bishop of Volterra until his death on 4 April 1568.

Catholic Church titles
Preceded by Benedetto Nerli	Bishop of Volterra; 1566–1568	Succeeded by Ludovico Antinori
