= Antonio degli Agli =

Most Reverend Antonio degli Agli
- Bishop of Volterra
- Church: Catholic Church
- Diocese: Diocese of Volterra
- In office: 1470–1477
- Predecessor: Ugolino Giugni
- Successor: Francesco Soderini
- Previous posts: Bishop of Dubrovnik (1465–1467); Bishop of Fiesole (1467–1470)

Personal details
- Died: 1477 Volterra, Italy

Antonio degli Agli (died 1477) was a Catholic prelate who served as Bishop of Volterra (1470–1477), Bishop of Fiesole (1467–1470), and Bishop of Dubrovnik (1465–1467).

== Biography ==
On 24 December 1465, Antonio degli Agli was appointed during the papacy of Pope Paul II as Bishop of Dubrovnik. On 4 May 1467, he was appointed during the papacy of Pope Paul II as Bishop of Fiesole. On 30 April 1470, he was appointed during the papacy of Pope Paul II as Bishop of Volterra. He served as Archbishop of Volterra until his death in 1477.

== External links and additional sources ==
- Cheney, David M. "Diocese of Dubrovnik (Ragusa)". Catholic-Hierarchy.org. (for Chronology of Bishops) ^{[self-published]}
- Chow, Gabriel. "Diocese of Dubrovnik (Croatia)". GCatholic.org. (for Chronology of Bishops) ^{[self-published]}

Catholic Church titles
Preceded by Francesco Petri	Bishop of Dubrovnik; 1465–1467	Succeeded by Timoteo Maffei
Preceded by Leonardo Salutati	Bishop of Fiesole; 1467–1470	Succeeded by Guglielmo Becchi
Preceded by Ugolino Giugni	Bishop of Volterra; 1470–1477	Succeeded by Francesco Soderini
