= Giovanni Matteo Sirtori =

Italian Roman Catholic prelate

Most Reverend Giovanni Matteo Sirtori
- Bishop of Volterra
- Church: Catholic Church
- Diocese: Diocese of Volterra
- In office: 1531–1545
- Predecessor: Francesco della Rovere
- Successor: Benedetto Nerli

Personal details
- Died: 1545 Volterra, Italy

Giovanni Matteo Sirtori (died 1545) was a Roman Catholic prelate who served as Bishop of Volterra (1531–1545).

== Biography ==
On 15 November 1531, Giovanni Matteo Sirtori was appointed during the papacy of Pope Clement VII as Bishop of Volterra. He served as Bishop of Volterra until his death in 1545.

Catholic Church titles
Preceded by Francesco della Rovere	Bishop of Volterra; 1531–1545	Succeeded by Benedetto Nerli
