= Benozzo Federighi =

Roman Catholic prelate

Most Reverend Benozzo Federighi
- Bishop of Fiesole
- Church: Catholic Church
- Diocese: Diocese of Fiesole
- In office: 1421–1450
- Predecessor: Bindus Ferrucci
- Successor: Leonardo Salutati

Personal details
- Died: 1450 Fiesole, Italy

Benozzo Federighi (died 1450) was a Roman Catholic prelate who served as Bishop of Fiesole (1421–1450).

== Biography ==
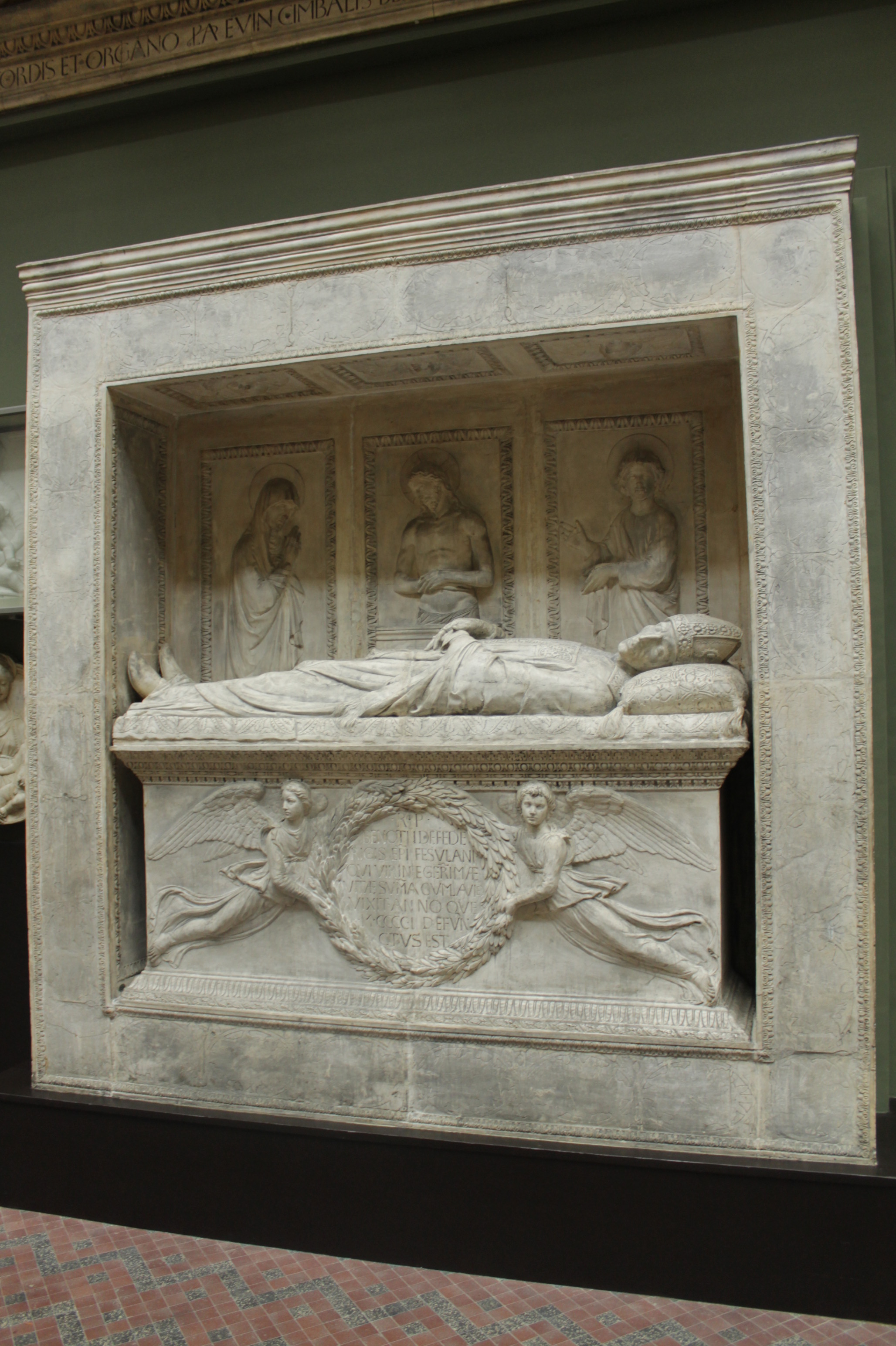
Tomb of Benozzo Federighi, 19th century plaster copy in the Victoria and Albert Museum

On 17 November 1421, Benozzo Federighi was appointed during the papacy of Pope Martin V as Bishop of Fiesole. He served as Bishop of Fiesole until his death in 1450.

While bishop, he was a principal co-consecrator of Antonio Forcilioni, Archbishop of Florence (1446).
His elegant tomb monument, once in San Francesco di Paolo in Oltrarno, was moved to the church of Santa Trinita in 1895.

A copy of the Federighi grave is held in the Cast Court of the Victoria and Albert Museum.

Catholic Church titles
Preceded by Bindus Ferrucci	Bishop of Fiesole; 1421–1450	Succeeded by Leonardo Salutati
