= Niccolò Sacchetti =

Roman Catholic prelate

Most Reverend Niccolò Sacchetti
- Bishop of Volterra
- Church: Catholic Church
- Diocese: Diocese of Volterra
- In office: 1634–1650
- Predecessor: Bernardo Inghirami
- Successor: Giovanni Gerini

Orders
- Consecration: 22 October 1634 by Giulio Cesare Sacchetti

Personal details
- Born: 1584 Florence, Italy
- Died: 8 June 1650 (aged 65–66) Volterra, Italy

Niccolò Sacchetti (1584 – 8 June 1650) was a Roman Catholic prelate who served as Bishop of Volterra (1634–1650).

== Biography ==
Niccolò Sacchetti was born in 1584 in Florence, Italy. On 25 September 1634, he was appointed during the papacy of Pope Urban VIII as Bishop of Volterra. On 22 October 1634, he was consecrated bishop by Giulio Cesare Sacchetti, Bishop of Fano, with Alphonse Sacrati, Bishop Emeritus of Comacchio, and Angelo Cesi, Bishop of Rimini, serving as co-consecrators. He served as Bishop of Volterra until his death on 8 June 1650.

While bishop, he was the principal co-consecrator of Lelio Falconieri, Titular Archbishop of Thebae (1634).

Catholic Church titles
Preceded by Bernardo Inghirami	Bishop of Volterra; 1634–1650	Succeeded by Giovanni Gerini
