= Constantine Arianiti =

Albanian nobleman

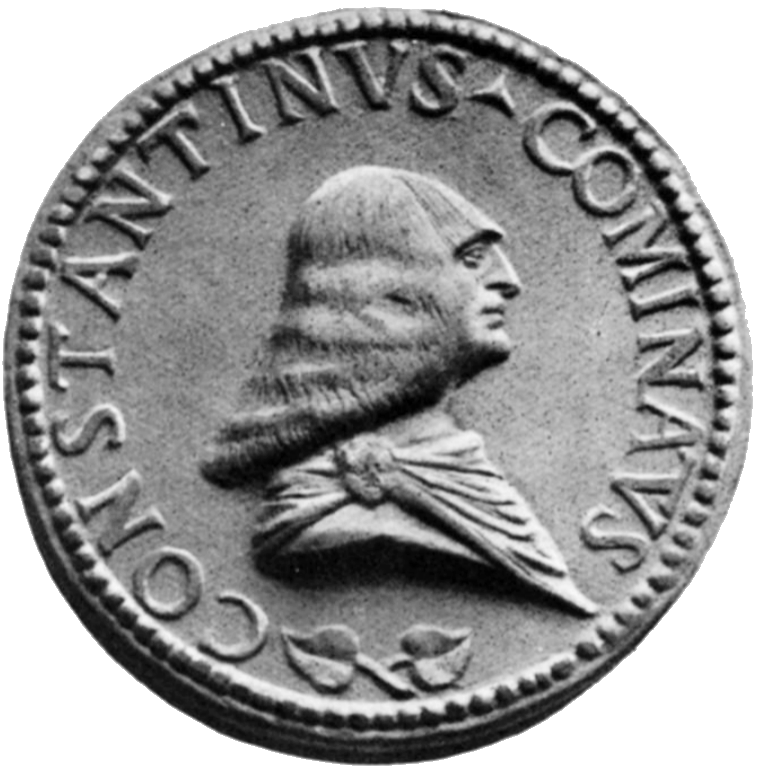
- Late 15th-century medal depicting Constantine Arianiti, inscribed constantinvs cominatvs

Prince of Macedonia (titular; self-proclaimed)
- Reign: c. 1494 – 8 May 1530
- Successor: Arianitto Arianiti

Duke of Achaea (titular; self-proclaimed)
- Reign: c. 1494 – 8 May 1530

Despot of the Morea (titular; self-proclaimed)
- Reign: 1502/1507 – 8 May 1530
- Predecessor: Andreas Palaiologos
- Rival claimant: Fernando Palaiologos (self-proclaimed)
- Born: 1456/1457; Probably Durrës; Albania
- Died: 8 May 1530 (aged c. 73/74); Montefiore Conca
- Burial: Santi Apostoli or Sant'Agostino, Rome
- Spouse: Francesca of Montferrat
- Issue: Arianitto Arianiti; Andronica Arianiti; Penthesilea Arianiti; Ippolita Arianiti; Polissena Arianiti; Deianira Arianiti; Elena Arianiti
- Dynasty: Arianiti
- Father: Gjergj Arianiti
- Mother: Pietrina Francone
- Religion: Roman Catholicism

Constantine Cominato Arianiti (Italian: Constantino Cominato Arianiti, (Note: Four different contemporary renditions of Constantine's name are attested: Constantino Arniti, Constantino Arianiti, Constantino Cominato and Constantino Commeno. The variants Arniti and Arianiti are the most common.) Albanian: Kostandin Komneni Arianiti; 1456/1457 – 8 May 1530) also known as Constantine Komnenos Arianites, was a 15th and 16th-century Albanian nobleman, military leader, diplomat and pretender who lived most of his life in exile in Italy due to the conquest of his homeland by the Ottoman Empire. Constantine sought to establish himself as a leader among the Christian Balkan refugees in Italy and claimed lordship over various former Christian lands in Greece, using the titles Prince of Macedonia, Duke of Achaea and Despot of the Morea.

The son of Gjergj Arianiti, an Albanian lord who had fought alongside the Albanian national hero Skanderbeg against the Ottomans, Constantine was taken to Italy for his safety in 1469, after the death of his father. In Italy, Constantine was noticed by Pope Sixtus IV, who provided him with a pension, and he quickly made a successful career for himself. In c. 1489, he married into the Palaeologus-Montferrat family, a branch of the Byzantine imperial Palaiologos dynasty, through marriage to Francesca of Montferrat, a probably illegitimate daughter of Boniface III, Marquis of Montferrat. The marriage resulted in Constantine's wealth and status increasing, and also paved the way for his tenure as regent of Montferrat, on behalf of Boniface's young son William IX, from 1495 to 1499.

In the early 16th century, Constantine served as a diplomat to the popes and the future Holy Roman Emperor Maximilian I, with both parties finding him to be a talented ambassador. Following his assumption of the titles 'Prince of Macedonia' and 'Duke of Achaea', to which he had no real claim, in the 1490s, Constantine partook in various schemes to organize expeditions against the Ottoman Empire, being involved in at least three separate crusade-related plans throughout his life. At some point between 1502 and 1507, Constantine assumed the title 'Despot of the Morea', previously legitimately used by Andreas Palaiologos, another title which he had no genealogical claim to. Despite his tenuous association with these titles, Constantine adamantly defended his use of them and, as seen through the roles he was expected to play in the various schemes he engaged in, was ready to risk his life to enforce his claims.

In 1514 of 1515, Constantine was appointed as the local governor of the town of Fano in the March of Ancona by Pope Leo X. Constantine may have aspired to become a leading figure among the many Balkan refugees in the March of Ancona, but any such dreams did not come to fruition. Instead, papal taxation policies made Constantine, as the governmental representative, disliked, and contemporary writings mock his insistence on his high-sounding titles. He was removed from office by Leo in 1516, following a riot by the locals, but was reinstated by Pope Clement VII in 1524, whereafter Constantine governed Fano from a mountain fortress at Montefiore Conca until his death in 1530. His only son, Arianitto Arianiti, continued his father's pretensions by using the title 'Prince of Macedonia', but relinquished Constantine's other titles.

== Biography ==
=== Background and early life ===
Constantine Cominato Arianiti was born in 1456 or 1457 as the son of Gjergj Arianiti (or 'George Komnenos Arianites'). Constantine's mother was Pietrina Francone from Apulia, a daughter of Oliviero Francone, an Aragonese officer in Lecce. Constantine had numerous siblings, including two brothers George and Thomas, and several sisters. Through Gjergj, Constantine and his siblings claimed descent from both Albanian and Byzantine noble families. Gjerg had been an Albanian military leader and lord, governing the settlements of Cerminitza and Catafigo in the vicinity of the city of Ragusa. Their family, the Arianiti, claimed to be the same family as the earlier Byzantine Arianites family, originally from Constantinople; modern scholars variously accept or cast doubt on this connection. Through the use of 'Komnenos', Constantine's family also proclaimed a connection to the Komnenos dynasty of emperors, which had ruled the Byzantine Empire 1081–1185. Later historians, such as George Francis Hill, have deemed the use of that name a 'false assimilation' of the name of the famous dynasty.

The Arianiti had grown increasingly influential in Albania just prior to the conquest of the country by the Ottoman Empire. Three of Constantine's sisters were married to highly influential figures: his sister Angelina was the wife of Stefan Branković, the Despot of Serbia, his sister Gojisava was the wife of Ivan Crnojević, the Lord of Zeta, and his sister Donika was the wife of the Albanian national hero Skanderbeg, who led the Albanian resistance against the Ottomans from 1443 to 1468. Their father Gjergj was an ally of Skanderbeg against the Ottomans, though he also sought to depose Skanderbeg in favor of himself, being defeated, pardoned and received back as an ally once again after such a rebellion in 1456. After the death of both Skanderbeg and Gjergj in 1468, the Ottomans slowly managed to crush the Albanian resistance, successfully having incorporate the country into their empire by 1479. During the long and drawn-out process of Ottoman conquest, many of the Albanians who chose to remain Christian fled across the Adriatic Sea to Italy. Among these refugees was Constantine, who was taken to Italy for his safety in 1469, at the age of twelve.

=== Early career and claims ===
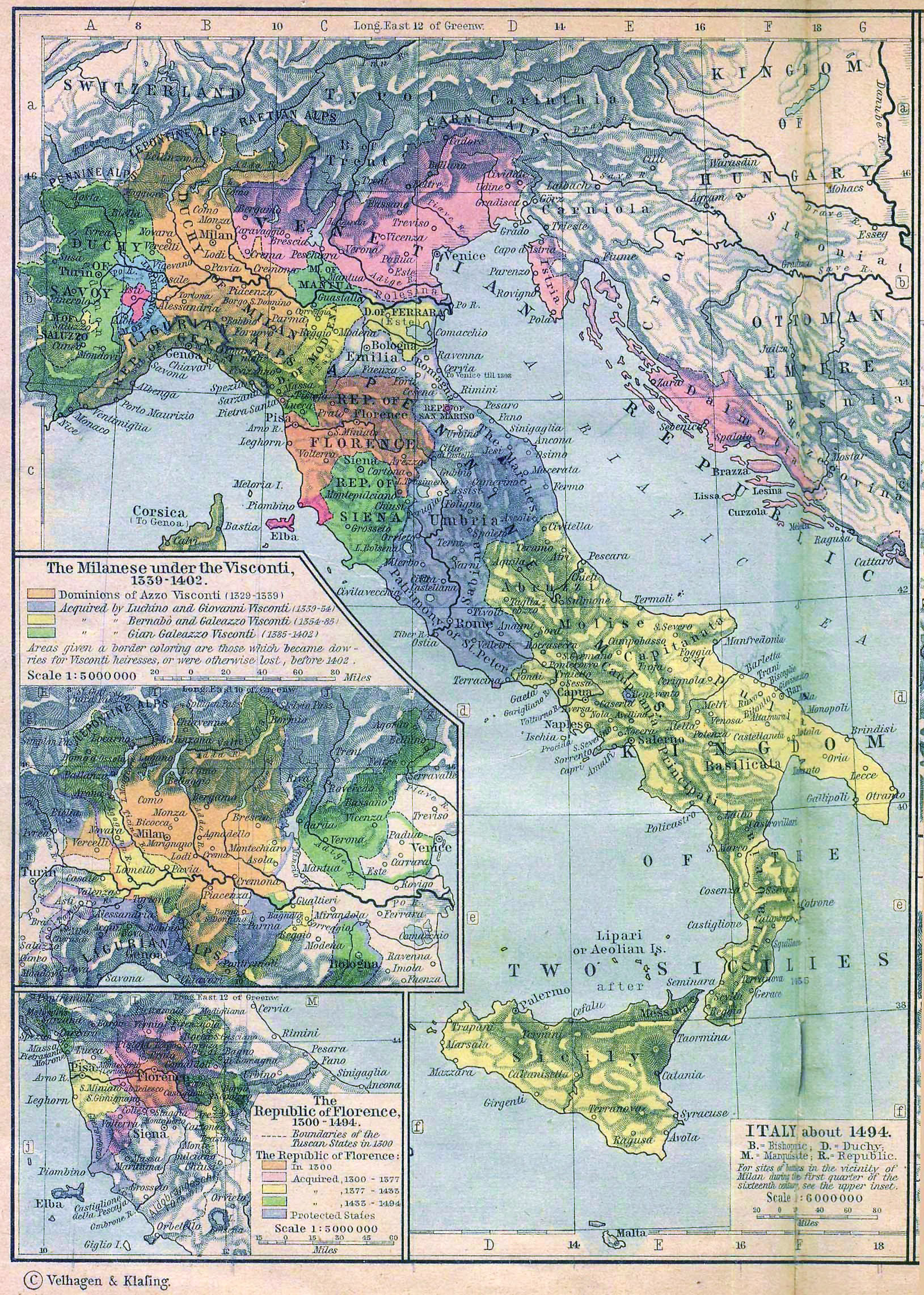
Political map of Italy in 1494. The March of Montferrat is the small blue stretch of land in the north-west.

Constantine would go on to have a successful career in Italy. In his youth, he was noticed by Pope Sixtus IV (r. 1471–1484), who provided him with a pension of 32 ducats a month. From the 1490s onwards, Constantine sought a leadership position among the many Christian Balkan refugees in Italy, following in his father's footsteps. Though his father had only claimed connection to Albania itself, Constantine had wider aspirations and began claiming to be the rightful ruler of the regions of Macedonia and Thessaly. To cement his claim, Constantine began to use the title 'Prince of Macedonia', and later also added 'Duke of Achaea', presumably adding the Peloponnese to the regions he claimed lordship over.

Although the assumption of Constantine's Greek titles may appear to be nothing more than bombastic and ephemeral pretensions, Constantine was adamant in defending them and ready to risk his own life in attempting to make them a reality. In 1494, Charles VIII of France purchased the title 'Emperor of Constantinople' from Andreas Palaiologos, the nephew of the final Byzantine emperor Constantine XI Palaiologos (r. 1449–1453) and claimant emperor and Despot of the Morea, as part of preparations for a crusade (which ultimately never took place). In the autumn of 1494, Charles and his ambassador, Philippe de Commines, who was a friend of Constantine, met with Constantine in Montferrat and agreed to a plan in which Constantine and Martin Albaro, the bishop of Durazzo, were to stir up a rebellion in Albania as a diversion for Charles' invasion of the Ottoman Empire. The records of these meetings are the first time Constantine's claimed titles are attested. Constantine apparently boasted of his titles to Commines, stating that his rightful lands, Macedonia and Thessaly, "had once been the inheritance of Alexander the Great. As a reward for stirring up rebellion in Albania, Commines hoped that Charles, upon victory against the Ottomans, would reward Constantine by making him the "King of Macedonia". Albaro travelled to Venice to make preparations, but the plan was doomed before it even began given that Albaro proved to be unable to keep it a secret and the information soon leaked to the Ottomans. Alarmed, the Venetian government arrested Albaro in January 1495 and assured the Ottomans that Venice had nothing to do with the plans. Constantine had also been in Venice at the time, but managed to escape imprisonment by fleeing on a ship to Apulia.

Constantine had been in Montferrat since 1486, in service to his niece Marija Branković, who was married to Boniface III, Marquis of Montferrat. In Montferrat he also met Francesca of Montferrat, presumably an illegitimate daughter of Boniface, whom he married c. 1489. The advantageous marriage resulted in Constantine being granted his own castle and accompanying lands, increasing his status and wealth considerably. After Boniface's death in 1494, Marija became the regent for her and Boniface's young son William IX. After Marija herself died in 1495, Constantine became the regent and guardian of his nephew. Constantine's regency in Montferrat lasted for five years. In 1499, Louis XII of France deposed Constantine during the Second Italian War, on account of "lukewarmness in the French cause", and had him imprisoned in the city of Novara. Constantine shortly thereafter managed to escape imprisonment, fleeing south to Pisa where he was appointed to a military command.

=== Papal and German diplomat ===
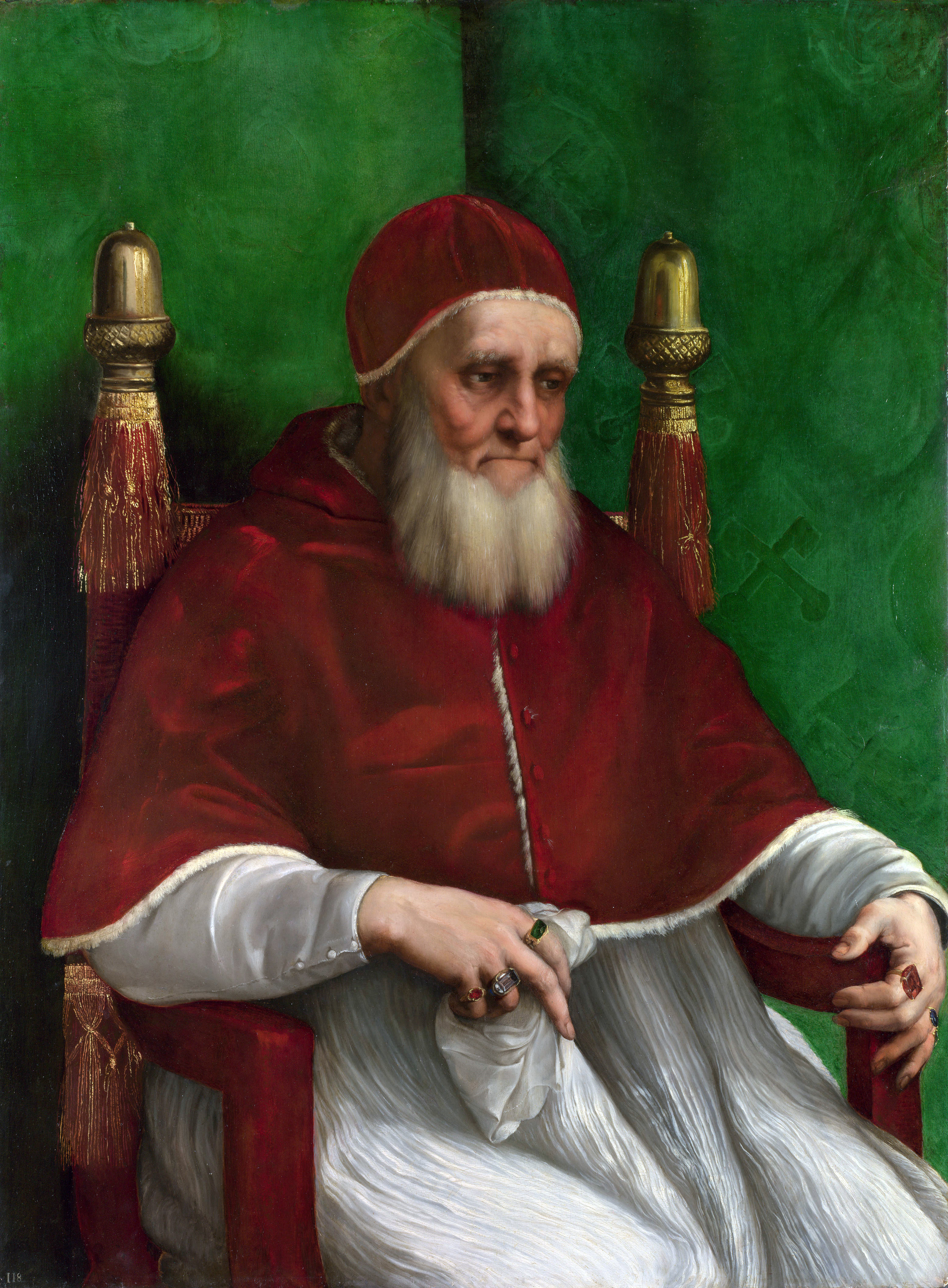
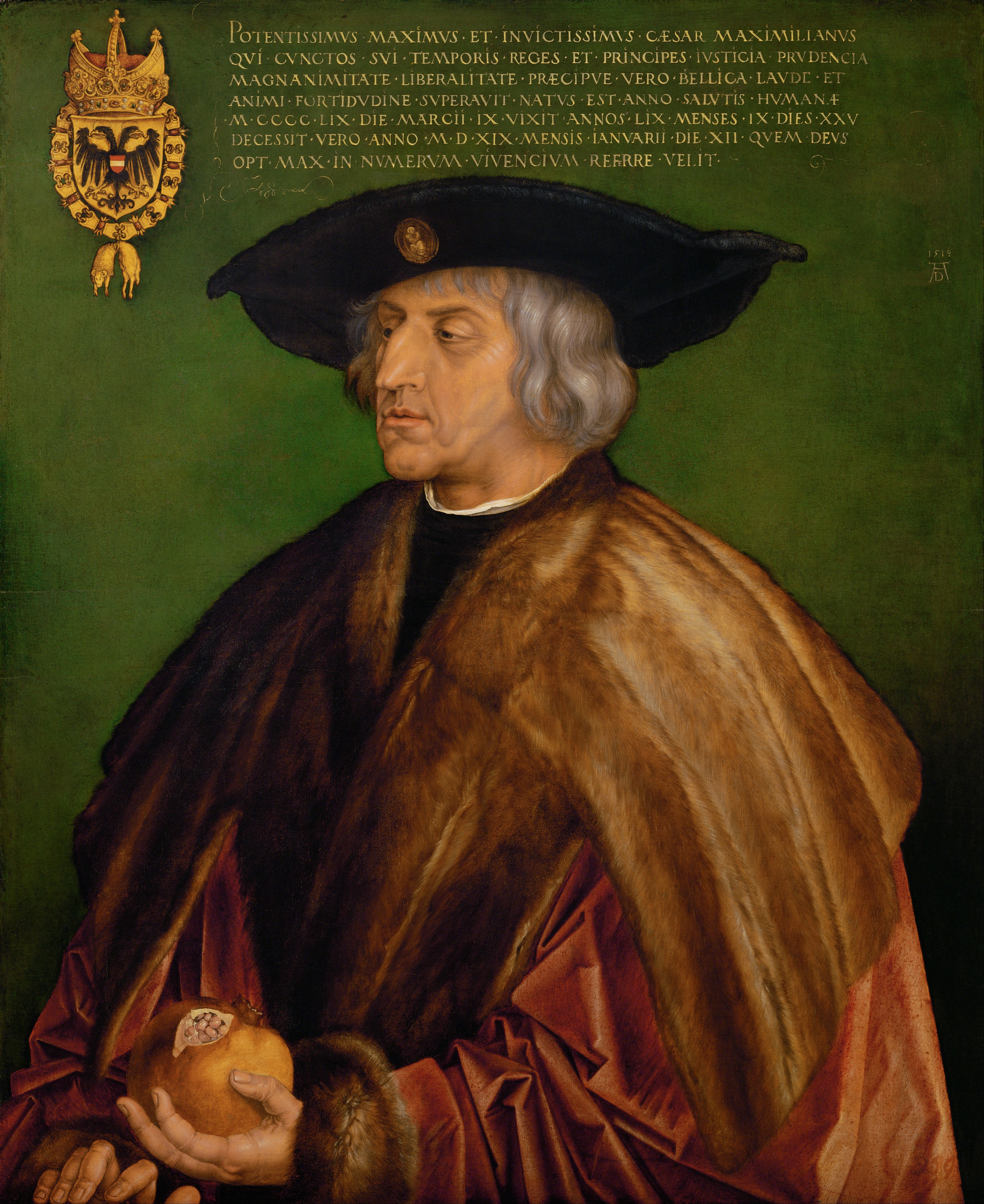
Pope Julius II (left) and Holy Roman Emperor Maximilian I (right)

From 1501 onwards, Constantine served the Papacy as a diplomat, travelling between Italy and Germany. Although opinion of him later appears to have soured, Constantine initially appears to have been highly skilled, as records exist of Constantine receiving praise both from the popes and from Maximilian I, the King of the Romans (who would later rule as Holy Roman Emperor 1508–1519). The contemporary Venetian historian Marino Sanuto the Younger recorded that Constantine, in addition to being tall and black-haired, was also a skilled speaker. In 1504, Constantine was sent by Pope Julius II (r. 1503–1513) as an ambassador to Maximilian. Constantine's diplomatic ability impressed Julius to such an extent that his monthly pension was increased to 200 ducats and he was put in charge of his own detachment of papal soldiers. The negotiations in which Constantine was involved eventually resulted in the formation of the unsuccessful League of Cambrai in 1508, an alliance to counteract the Ottomans and the Republic of Venice. According to the historian Jonathan Harris, Constantine's involvements in these affairs illustrates his willingness to make good on his claims in Greece and aspire to his father's role of anti-Ottoman leadership. Constantine's contemporaries appear to have respected his claims to lands in Greece, given that Maximilian referred to Constantine by both 'Prince of Macedonia' and 'Duke of Achaea' when sending him back as an ambassador to Rome in 1504.

After the death of Andreas Palaiologos in June 1502, Constantine added 'Despot of the Morea' to his claimed titles. It is unclear when exactly Constantine began to claim this title, though it may have begun only a few months after Andreas's death given that a letter from Antonio Giustiniani, Venetian ambassador to the Pope, mentions a 'despot' in command of a cavalry unit in October 1502. It is certain that the title was in use by October 1507, when it is among the titles applied to him during his diplomatic travels to Germany. Though Constantine had met Andreas while he was still alive, they were not genealogically related, which makes it unclear on what grounds he could claim to be Andreas's successor as despot. Perhaps he derived his claim through his connection to the Komnenos dynasty, or possibly through his marriage to Francesca of Montferrat. The ruling family of Montferrat, the house of Palaeologus-Montferrat, were distant relatives of Andreas, being descended from emperor Andronikos II Palaiologos (r. 1282–1328). The title of 'Despot of the Morea' was also claimed by Fernando Palaiologos, possibly an illegitimate son of Andreas.

=== Governor of Fano ===
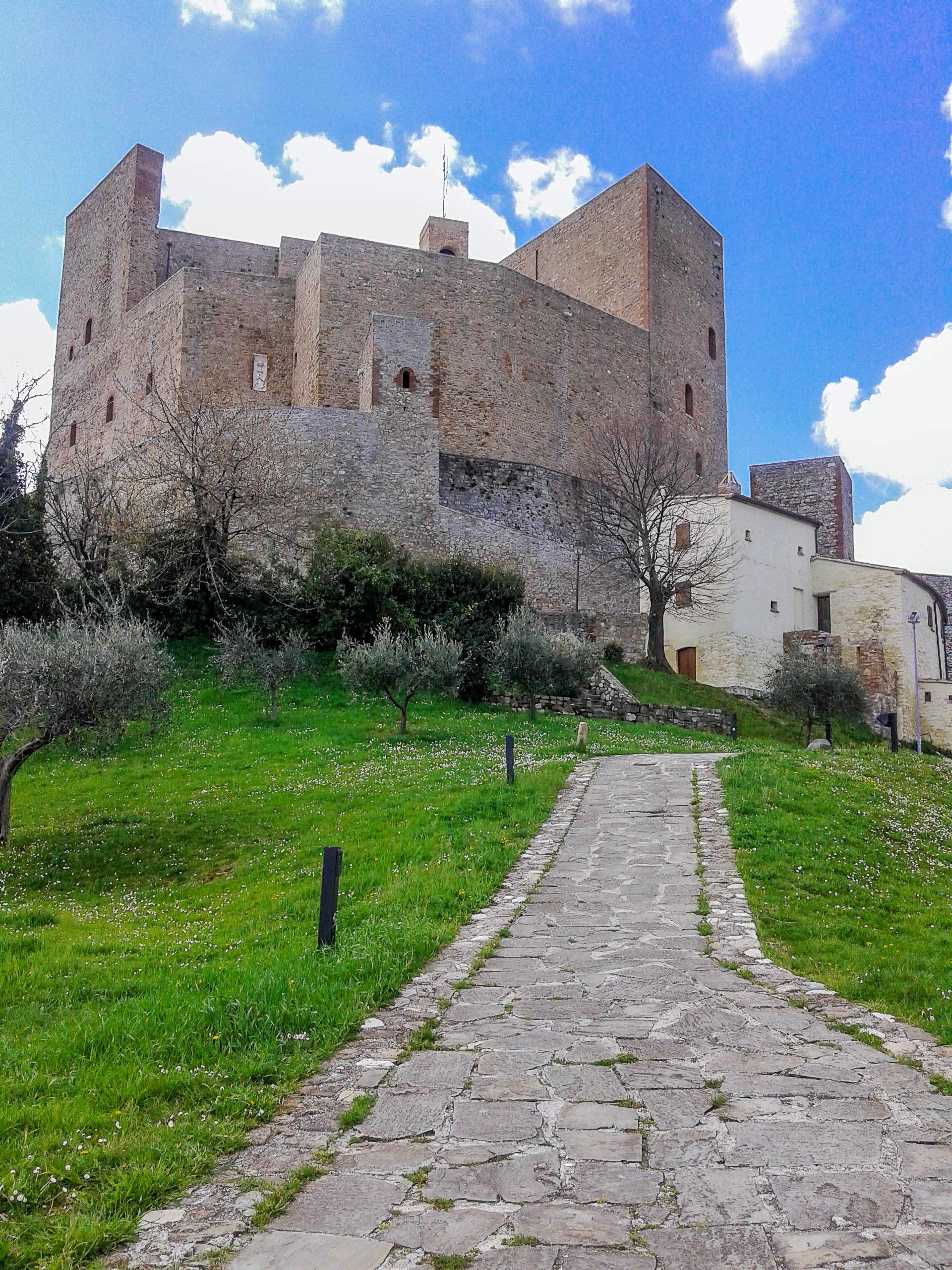
The castle of the mountain village Montefiore Conca, Constantine's main residence from 1524 to 1530

In 1514 or 1515,Pope Leo X (r. 1513–1521) made Constantine the governor of the town of Fano in the March of Ancona. The March of Ancone was a strip of territory facing the Dalmatian coast across the Adriatic Sea, making it a natural launching point for an invasion of the Ottoman Empire's lands in the Balkans. It is probable that Leo intended to use it as such, and appointed Constantine as governor of Fano as part of planning a new crusade. In September 1513, Leo had issued crusade indulgences for the first time in many years and the pope had concentrated efforts on promoting unity among the monarchs of Europe. In 1515, Leo had begun preparing a fleet in Ancona and in 1517, plans were made for a Papal contingent to sail from Ancona and meet up with the fleets of Spain, Portugal and England. Rumors were circulating that Leo had also offered to crown Francis I of France (r. 1515–1547) as Emperor of Constantinople if he agreed to lead the crusade. Francis was already claiming that title, through inheritance from Charles, and is recorded to have publicly stressed his imperial claim as late as 1532.

Although no crusade ultimately took place this time either, there might also have been another practical reason for Constantine's appointment in Fano. Given the March of Ancona's proximity to the Balkan coastline, the region, along with the southern region of Calabria and the city of Venice, was a natural point of settlement for refugees from Albania and Greece. The port in the city of Ancona was a particularly popular arrival point, and though many refugees moved on and settled elsewhere, there were a considerably number who stayed. By 1520, records indicate that there were about two hundred Greek families living in Ancona. Through using the architectural styles of their homelands and retaining traditions and customs, the refugees and their descendants in Ancona continued to foster links with their pasts. Though Constantine would ultimately not succeed in gaining control of the regions he claimed to be the rightful ruler of, he may have aspired to be accepted by the Balkan refugees in Fano and the rest of the March of Ancona as a leadership figure.

If Constantine had such aspirations, they were not successful. Constantine was not popular among the people of Fano, being disliked not only by the Italians but also by the Albanians and Greeks, who were mostly discontent over the heavy taxations by the Papacy owing to the recent wars in Italy. Though this was thus not Constantine's fault, his high-sounding titles were also a source of mockery among some of the populace. In the comedy La Cortigiana by the contemporary author, playwright, satirist and poet Pietro Aretino, Constantine's titles are explicitly mocked in the text. In the early 1525 edition of La Cortigiana, the relevant passage reads "If noble blood were all that was needed to bring honor to men who don't deserve it, then the king of Cyprus and the prince of Fiossa wouldn't be in such bad shape. Signor Constantino would get the principality of Macedonia back; he'd think it beneath his dignity to be governor of Fano" and the later, more restrained, 1534 edition reads "But who is more noble than Signor Constantine who was despot of the Morea and prince of Macedonia and now is governor of Fano?", a more sarcastic and implied, rather than overt, mockery. In 1516, the townsfolk of Fano began rioting, forcing Constantine to flee to the castle. The affair led Leo to depose Constantine and install Lorenzo de' Medici, Duke of Urbino, as the governor of Fano in Constantine's stead. Constantine was reappointed as governor of Fano by Pope Clement VII (r. 1523–1534) in 1524. During his second tenure as governor, Constantine lived in the nearby mountain village of Montefiore Conca, also granted to him by Clement, rather than in Fano itself, given that the castle in Montefiore Conca was nearly impenetrable.

Constantine died in Montefiore Conca on 8 May 1530 and was buried in Santi Apostoli or Sant'Agostino in Rome. Two of Constantine's claimed titles, 'Prince of Macedonia' and 'Duke of Achaea', were inscribed on his tomb. The precise location of his grave is not known. Constantine's son Arianitto continued his father's aspirations and pretensions, though the only of his father's titles he is attested to have used was 'Prince of Macedonia'.

== Family ==
With his wife Francesca, Constantine had one son and six daughters. The names of the children were:

- Arianitto, Constantine's only son. Served as a captain in the army of the Papal States until his death on 16 November 1551. Arianitto's death ended the male line of the Arianiti family in Italy.
- Andronica, Constantine's eldest daughter. Married Carlo III Tocco, the claimant Despot of Epirus and Count Palatine of Cephalonia and Zakynthos. Through their son Leonardo IV Tocco she was ancestral to the later members of the Tocco family.
- Penthesilea, Constantine's second daughter. Married Lek Dukagjin of the Albanian Dukagjini family.
- Ippolita, Constantine's third daughter. Married Zanobio de 'Medici of the Italian Medici family. Remarried in 1532 to Lionello Pio di Carpi of the Pio di Savoia family.
- Polissena, Constantine's fourth daughter. Married Rinaldo degli Ottoni di Matelica of the Ottoni family.
- Deianira, Constantine's fifth daughter. Married Giorgio Trivulzio of the Trivulzio family.
- Elena, Constantine's sixth daughter. Married Juan de Luna, a castellan in Milan.

== Notes ==
Constantine Arianiti Arianiti family Born: 1456/1457 Died: 8 May 1530
Titles in pretence
New title	— TITULAR — Prince of Macedonia c. 1494–1530	Succeeded by Arianitto Arianiti
New title	— TITULAR — Duke of Achaea c. 1494–1530	Title abandoned
Preceded by Andreas Palaiologos	— TITULAR — Despot of the Morea; 1502/1507–1530	Title abandoned
