= Francesco della Rovere (archbishop of Benevento) =

Roman Catholic prelate (died 1545)

Most Reverend Francesco della Rovere
- Archbishop of Benevento
- Church: Catholic Church
- Archdiocese: Benevento
- In office: 1530–1545
- Predecessor: Alfonso Sforza
- Successor: Giovanni Della Casa
- Previous posts: Bishop of Mileto (1505–1508); Bishop of Camerino (1508–1509); Bishop of Vicenza (1509–1514); Bishop of Volterra (1514–1530)

Personal details
- Died: 1545

Francesco della Rovere di Savona (died 1545) was a Roman Catholic prelate who served as Archbishop of Benevento (1530–1545), Bishop of Volterra (1514–1530), Bishop of Vicenza (1509–1514), Bishop of Camerino (1508–1509), and Bishop of Mileto (1505–1508).

== Biography ==
Francesco della Rovere was the son of Bartolomeo Giuppo della Rovere, a nobleman from the Della Rovere family and Albanian Princess Maria Arianiti, daughter of Gjergj Arianiti. In 1505, he was appointed during the papacy of Pope Julius II as Bishop of Mileto. On 23 Feb 1508, he was appointed during the papacy of Pope Julius II as Bishop of Camerino. In Jul 1509, he was appointed during the papacy of Pope Julius II as Bishop of Vicenza. On 12 Jun 1514, he was appointed during the papacy of Pope Leo X as Bishop of Volterra. On 12 Jan 1530, he was appointed during the papacy of Pope Clement VII as Archbishop of Benevento. He served as Archbishop of Benevento until his resignation on 2 Apr 1544. He died in 1545.

== External links and additional sources ==
- Cheney, David M. "Archdiocese of Camerino–San Severino Marche". Catholic-Hierarchy.org. (for Chronology of Bishops) ^{[self-published]}
- Chow, Gabriel. "Archdiocese of Camerino–San Severino Marche (Italy)". GCatholic.org. (for Chronology of Bishops) ^{[self-published]}
- Cheney, David M. "Diocese of Vicenza". Catholic-Hierarchy.org. (for Chronology of Bishops) ^{[self-published]}
- Chow, Gabriel. "Diocese of Vicenza". GCatholic.org. (for Chronology of Bishops) ^{[self-published]}
- Cheney, David M. "Archdiocese of Benevento". Catholic-Hierarchy.org. (for Chronology of Bishops) ^{[self-published]}
- Chow, Gabriel. "Archdiocese of Benevento (Italy)". GCatholic.org. (for Chronology of Bishops) ^{[self-published]}
- "Cronotassi dei vescovi". Diocesi di Mileto Nicotera Tropea. Archived from the original on August 11, 2018. (for Chronology of Bishops)

Catholic Church titles
Preceded by Francesco Alidosi	Bishop of Mileto; 1505–1508	Succeeded by Andrea della Valle
Preceded by Sisto Gara della Rovere	Bishop of Camerino; 1508–1509	Succeeded by Anton Giacomo Bongiovanni
Preceded by Sisto Gara della Rovere	Bishop of Vicenza; 1509–1514	Succeeded by Francesco Soderini
Preceded by Giuliano Soderini	Bishop of Volterra; 1514–1530	Succeeded by Giovanni Salviati
Preceded by Alfonso Sforza	Archbishop of Benevento; 1530–1545	Succeeded by Giovanni Della Casa
