= Despotate of the Morea =

Province of the late Byzantine Empire

Coordinates: 37.5000°N 22.5000°E

Despotate of the Morea Δεσποτᾶτον τοῦ Μορέως
- 1349–1460
- Flag of the Byzantine Empire under the Palaiologos dynasty Seal of Demetrios Palaiologos as Despot of the Morea

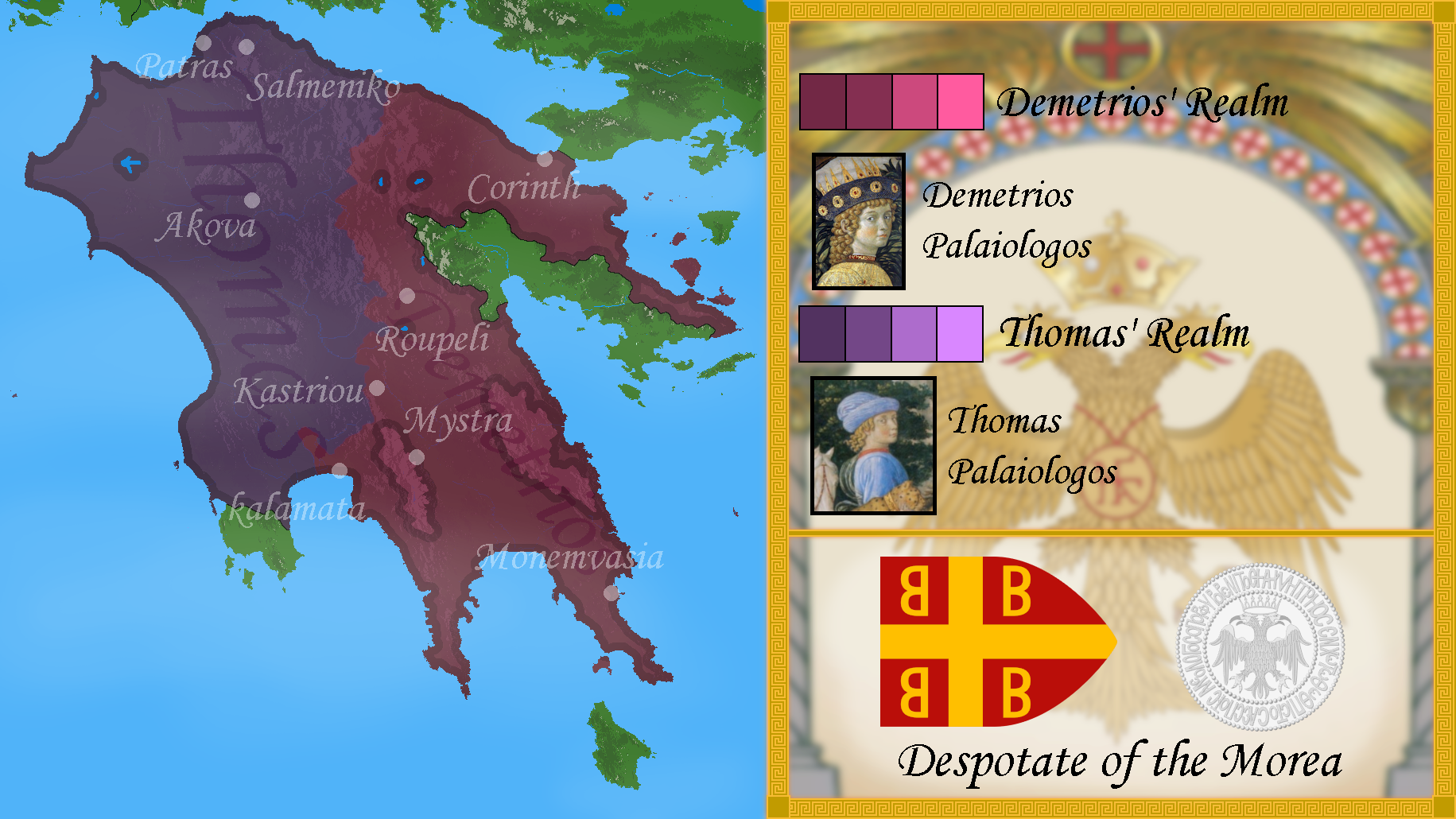
- Status: Semi-autonomous appanage of the Byzantine Empire
- Capital: Mystras (main capital, 1349–1460): Glarentza (Constantine, 1428–1432); Kalavryta (Thomas, 1428–1432, Constantine, 1432–1443); Elis (Thomas, 1432–1449); Patras and Leontari (Thomas, 1449–1460)
- Common languages: Medieval Greek
- Religion: Eastern Orthodox Church
- Government: Feudal monarchy
- Despot of Morea
  - 1349–1380: Manuel Kantakouzenos
  - 1449–1460: Thomas Palaiologos and Demetrios Palaiologos
- Historical era: Late Medieval
  - Established: 1349
  - 1450s peasant revolt: 1453–1454
  - Ottoman conquest: 29 May 1460
Preceded by	Succeeded by
Principality of Achaea	Rumelia Eyalet
- Today part of: Greece: Peloponnese

The Despotate of the Morea or Despotate of Mystras was a province of the Byzantine Empire between the mid-14th and mid-15th centuries. Its territory varied in size during its existence but eventually grew to include almost all the southern Greek peninsula now known as the Peloponnese, which was known as the Morea during the medieval and early modern periods. The territory was usually ruled by one or more sons or brothers of the current Byzantine emperor, who were given the title of despotes (in this context it should not be confused with despotism). Its capital was the fortified city of Mystras, near ancient Sparta, which became an important centre of the Palaiologan Renaissance.

== History ==
The Despotate of the Morea was created out of territory seized from the Frankish Principality of Achaea. This had been organized from former Byzantine territory after the Fourth Crusade (1204). In 1259, the Principality's ruler William II Villehardouin lost the Battle of Pelagonia against the Byzantine Emperor Michael VIII Palaeologus. William was forced to ransom himself by surrendering most of the eastern part of Morea and his newly built strongholds. The surrendered territory became the nucleus of the Despotate of Morea.

A later Byzantine emperor, John VI Kantakouzenos, reorganized the territory in 1349 to establish it as an appanage for his son, the Despot Manuel Kantakouzenos. For the larger portion of his reign, Manuel maintained peaceful relations with his Latin neighbors and secured a long period of prosperity for the area. Greco-Latin cooperation included an alliance to contain the raids of Murad I into Morea in the 1360s. The rival Palaiologos dynasty seized the Morea after Manuel's death in 1380, with Theodore I Palaiologos becoming despot in 1383. Theodore ruled until 1407, consolidating Byzantine rule and coming to terms with his more powerful neighbours—particularly the expansionist Ottoman Empire, whose suzerainty he recognised. He also sought to reinvigorate the local economy by inviting Albanians to settle in the territory, who developed into the Arvanite community, with several leaving for the Kingdom of Naples in the 15th century and forming the Arbëreshë community.

Subsequent despots were the sons of the Emperor Manuel II Palaiologos, brother of the despot Theodore: Theodore II, Constantine, Demetrios, and Thomas. As Latin power in the Peloponnese waned during the 15th century, the Despotate of the Morea expanded to incorporate the entire peninsula in 1430 with territory being acquired by dowry settlements, and the conquest of Patras by Constantine. However, in 1446 the Ottoman Sultan Murad II destroyed the Byzantine defences—the Hexamilion wall at the Isthmus of Corinth. His attack opened the peninsula to invasion, though Murad died before he could exploit this. His successor Mehmed II "the Conqueror" captured the Byzantine capital Constantinople in 1453. The despots Demetrios and Thomas Palaiologos, brothers of the last emperor, failed to send him any aid, as Morea was recovering from a recent Ottoman attack. Their rule was unpopular, however, resulting in an Albanian–Greek revolt against them, during which they invited Ottoman troops to help them put down the revolt. At this time, a number of influential Greek archons made peace with Mehmed. After more years of incompetent rule by the despots, their failure to pay their annual tribute to the Sultan, and finally their own revolt against Ottoman rule, Mehmed came into the Morea in May 1460. Demetrios ended up a prisoner of the Ottomans and his younger brother Thomas fled. By the end of the summer, the Ottomans had achieved the submission of virtually all cities possessed by the Greeks.

A few holdouts remained for a time. The rocky peninsula of Monemvasia refused to surrender, and it was first ruled for a brief time by a Catalan corsair. When the population drove him out, they obtained the consent of Thomas to submit to the Pope's protection before the end of 1460. The Mani Peninsula at the south end of the Morea resisted under a loose coalition of the local clans, and that area then came under Venice's rule. The last holdout was Salmeniko, in the Morea's northwest. Graitzas Palaiologos was the military commander there, stationed at Salmeniko Castle (also known as Castle Orgia). While the town eventually surrendered, Graitzas and his garrison and some town residents held out in the castle until July 1461, when they escaped and reached Venetian territory. Thus ended the last of the Byzantine Empire proper.

After 1461, the only non-Ottoman territories were possessed by Venice: the port cities of Modon and Koroni at the southern end of the Morea, the Argolid with Argos, and the port of Nafplion. Monemvasia subsequently surrendered itself to Venice at the beginning of the 1463–1479 Ottoman–Venetian War.

== Byzantine despots of the Morea ==
Number	Despot of the Morea (Birth–Death)	Portrait	Term start	Term end	Notes	Emperor of the Romans (Start of reign–End of reign)
1	Manuel Kantakouzenos (c. 1326–1380)		1349	1380	Son of Emperor John VI Kantakouzenos. Was named despot after the end of the Byzantine–Genoese War. Was able to contain Turkish raids but failed to conquer the remnants of the Principality of Achaea.	John VI Kantakouzenos (1347–1354)
1	Manuel Kantakouzenos (c. 1326–1380)		1349	1380	Son of Emperor John VI Kantakouzenos. Was named despot after the end of the Byzantine–Genoese War. Was able to contain Turkish raids but failed to conquer the remnants of the Principality of Achaea.	John V Palaiologos (1332–1391) and Andronikos IV Palaiologos(1352–1385)
2	Matthew Asen Kantakouzenos (c. 1325–1383)		1380	1383	Son of Emperor John VI Kantakouzenos. Inherited the title from his brother Manuel.	John V Palaiologos (1332–1391) and Andronikos IV Palaiologos(1352–1385)
3	Demetrios I Kantakouzenos (c. 1325–1383)		1383		Son of Matthew. Inherited the title from his father.	John V Palaiologos (1332–1391) and Andronikos IV Palaiologos(1352–1385)
4	Theodore I Palaiologos (c. 1325–1383)		1383	1407	Son of Emperor John V Palaiologos. Was given Morea after the defeat of the Kantakouzenos.	John V Palaiologos (1332–1391) and Andronikos IV Palaiologos(1352–1385)
4	Theodore I Palaiologos (c. 1325–1383)		1383	1407	Son of Emperor John V Palaiologos. Was given Morea after the defeat of the Kantakouzenos.	Manuel II Palaiologos(1391–1425)
4	Theodore I Palaiologos (c. 1325–1383)		1383	1407	Son of Emperor John V Palaiologos. Was given Morea after the defeat of the Kantakouzenos.	John VIII Palaiologos (1425–1448)
5	Theodore II Palaiologos (c. 1396–1448)		1407	1443	Son of Emperor Manuel II Palaiologos. Was proclaimed despot after the death of Theodore. Conquered the Toccian positions in Morea.	John VIII Palaiologos (1425–1448)
6	Constantine Palaiologos (c. 1404–1453)		1428	1449	Son of Emperor Manuel II Palaiologos. Conquered the last remnants of the Principality of Achaea. Became emperor from 1449 to 1453	John VIII Palaiologos (1425–1448)
7	Thomas Palaiologos 1409–1465)		1428	1460	Son of Emperor Manuel II Palaiologos.	John VIII Palaiologos (1425–1448)
7	Thomas Palaiologos 1409–1465)		1428	1460	Son of Emperor Manuel II Palaiologos.	Constantine IX Palaiologos (1449–1453)
8	Demetrios II Palaiologos 1407–1470)		1449	1460	Son of Emperor Manuel II Palaiologos.	Constantine IX Palaiologos (1449–1453)

Following the Ottoman conquest of the Morea, the title continued to be used by Thomas Palaiologos and his son Andreas in exile, as well as several pretenders after their deaths;

Image	Name	Reign	Succession & notes
	Thomas Palaiologos	1460–1465	Claimed the title in exile.
	Andreas Palaiologos	1465–1502	Son of Thomas. Suffered from financial troubles and had to sell the rights to the Byzantine crown. Attempted to launch an expedition to Morea in 1481 but was unable to fund the expedition.
	Constantine Arianiti	1502/1507–1530	Claimed the title of despot after Andreas death. Was known to claim lordship to over various former Christian lands in Greece.
	Fernando Palaiologos	1499/1502–?	Claimed the title of despot after Andreas death. Was possibly a son of Andreas, but very little is known about his life.

== See also ==
- Byzantine Greece
- Principality of Theodoro
- Byzantine Empire under the Palaiologos dynasty
