= Arianitto Arianiti =

Italian nobleman of Albanian descent

Prince of Macedonia (titular)
- Reign: 8 May 1530 – 16 November 1551
- Predecessor: Constantine Arianiti
- Successor: Andrea Angeli
- Died: 16 November 1551; Torchiara
- Spouse: Unknown
- Issue: Andronica Arianiti
- Dynasty: Arianiti
- Father: Constantine Arianiti
- Mother: Francesca of Montferrat
- Religion: Roman Catholicism

Arianitto Arianiti (died 16 November 1551), self-styled as Arianitto Comneno (Latin: Arianita Comnenus), was a 16th-century Italian nobleman of Albanian descent, the only son of the diplomat and pretender Constantine Arianiti. After his father's death in 1530, Arianitto continued Constantine's pretensions, styling himself as the 'Prince of Macedonia', but dropping the other titles used by his father. He served as a captain in the papal army in Rome until his death in battle in 1551, which ended the male line of the Arianiti family in Italy.

== Biography ==
Arianitto Cominato Arianiti was the only son of Constantine Arianiti. Constantine was an Albanian noble who lived in exile in Italy owing to the conquest of his homeland by the Ottoman Empire. Following in the footsteps of his father Gjergj Arianiti, who had fought the Ottomans during their invasion of Albania, Constantine had sought to establish himself as a leadership figure among the Balkan refugees in Italy. Constantine also partook in ultimately unsuccessful schemes to organize expeditions to fight the Ottomans. In the 1490s, Arianitto's father assumed the titles 'Prince of Macedonia' and 'Duke of Achaea', making concrete claims to lordship over territories in Greece. Arianitto's mother was Francesca of Montferrat, the (probably illegitimate) daughter of Boniface III, Marquis of Montferrat (r. 1483–1494). The Montferrat ruling family, the House of Palaeologus-Montferrat, were distant relatives of the last few Byzantine emperors, being descended from emperor Andronikos II Palaiologos (r. 1282–1328).

Upon Constantine's death on 8 May 1530, Arianitto inherited his father's titles and claims. Although Constantine had claimed three titles: Prince of Macedonia, Duke of Achaea and Despot of the Morea, the only title of the three attested to have been assumed in pretense by Arianitto was 'Prince of Macedonia'. Arianitto lived with his mother for a time in the mountain village of Montefiore Conca, where Constantine had spent his last few years, though the two later moved to Rome. In Rome, Arianitto joined the papal military, rising through the ranks until he was eventually made captain of a contingent of soldiers. He was married at some point, though the name of his wife has not been preserved in the sources. Arianitto was killed in battle on 16 November 1551 at Torchiara during a conflict between Pope Julius III (r. 1550–1555) and Ottavio Farnese, Duke of Parma (r. 1547–1586). With Arianitto's death, the male line of the Arianiti family in Italy was rendered extinct. Arianitto had only a single child, a daughter, who married into the Trivulzio family. Although more legitimate heirs existed, such as the Tocco family, descended from Arianitto's eldest sister, the title of 'Prince of Macedonia' was after Arianitto's death claimed by his cousins of the Angelo Flavio Comneno family, supposed descendants of the Angelos dynasty of Byzantine emperors.

Arianitto Arianiti Arianiti family Died: 16 November 1551
Titles in pretence
Preceded by Constantine Arianiti	— TITULAR — Prince of Macedonia; 1530–1551	Succeeded by Andrea Angeli
