= Ugolino Giugni =

Italian Roman Catholic prelate

Most Reverend Ugolino Giugni
- Bishop of Volterra
- Church: Catholic Church
- Diocese: Diocese of Volterra
- In office: 1462–1470
- Predecessor: Giovanni Neroni Diotisalvi
- Successor: Antonio degli Agli

Personal details
- Died: 25 April 1470 Volterra, Italy

Ugolino Giugni (died 1470) was a Roman Catholic prelate who served as Bishop of Volterra (1462–1470).

== Biography ==
On 22 March 1462, Ugolino Giugni was appointed during the papacy of Pope Pius II as Bishop of Volterra. He served as Bishop of Volterra until his death on 25 April 1470.

Catholic Church titles
Preceded by Giovanni Neroni Diotisalvi	Bishop of Volterra; 1462–1470	Succeeded by Antonio degli Agli
