= Diocese of Volterra =

Roman Catholic diocese in Italy

Diocese of Volterra Dioecesis Volaterrana

Catholic
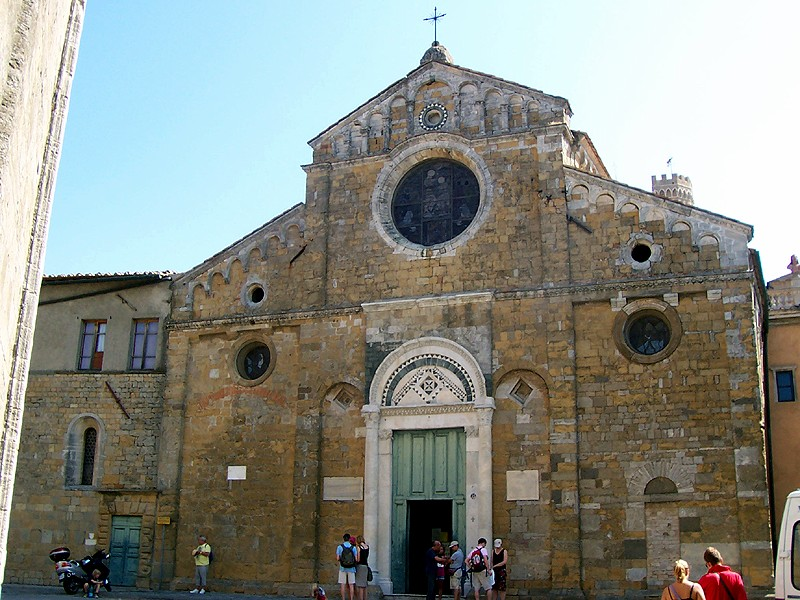
- Volterra Cathedral

Location
- Country: Italy
- Ecclesiastical province: Pisa

Statistics
- Area: 1,743 km^{2} (673 sq mi)
- Population: Total; Catholics: (as of 2020); 94,533; 89,301 (94.5%)
- Parishes: 88

Information
- Denomination: Catholic Church
- Rite: Roman Rite
- Established: 5th century
- Cathedral: Basilica Cattedrale di S. Maria Assunta
- Secular priests: 43 (diocesan); 9 (Religious Orders); 3 Permanent Deacons

Current leadership
- Pope: Leo XIV
- Bishop: Roberto Campiotti
- Bishops emeritus: Vasco Giuseppe Bertelli, Alberto Silvani

Map

Website
- www.diocesivolterra.it

The Diocese of Volterra (Latin: Dioecesis Volaterrana) is a Latin church diocese of the Catholic Church in Tuscany, central Italy. It is a suffragan of the Archdiocese of Pisa.

== History ==
Volterra was an ancient Etruscan town, later conquered by the Romans.

According to the Liber Pontificalis, Volterra was the birthplace of St. Linus, the immediate successor of St. Peter. Nothing is known of its Christian origins. Justus (560), along with his brother Clement and Ottaviano, is one of the three patrons of the diocese of Volterra, and was involved in the Schism of the Three Chapters.

In the Carolingian period it belonged to the Marquisate of Tuscany; with the approval of Henry, son of Frederick Barbarossa, its governance passed into the hands of the bishop, until his temporal authority was suspended by the commune. In the wars or factions of the 13th century, Volterra, being Ghibelline, was continually embroiled with the Florentines, who captured it in 1254, but won permanent control only in 1361.

The diocese of Volterra was immediately subject to the Holy See until 1856, when it became a suffragan of Pisa.

=== Diocesan synods ===
A diocesan synod was an irregularly held but important meeting of the bishop of a diocese and his clergy. Its purposes were to proclaim the various decrees already issued by the bishop, to discuss and ratify measures on which the bishop chose to consult with his clergy, and to publish statutes and decrees of the diocesan synod, of the provincial synod, and of the Holy See.

Bishop Guido Servidio (1574–1598) presided over a diocesan synod in the cathedral of Volterra on 8–10 May 1590, and had the constitutions of the meeting published. Bishop Orazio degli Albizzi (1655–1676) held a diocesan synod on 2 October 1657, and published the acts; he held another synod on 11 November 1674. A diocesan synod was held by Bishop Ottavio del Rosso (1681–1714) in the cathedral on 14–15 June 1684, the acts of which were published. He held his second synod in the cathedral of Volterra on 26–27 April 1690; its decrees were also published.

== Bishops of Volterra ==
=== to 800 ===
...

- Eumantius (before 496)
- Opilio (before 496)
- Eucharistius (494-496)
- Elpidius (attested 496, 501, 502)
- Gaudentius (attested 556)

Leo (566?)

- Geminianus (attested 649)

...

- Marcianus (attested 680)

...

- Tommaso (attested 752)

...

=== 800 to 1200 ===
...
[Andreas (820 or 822)]

- Grippo (attested 821)
- Petrus (attested 826, 833)
- Andreas (attested 845, 851, 853)

...

- Gauginus (attested 874, 882)
- Petrus (attested 886)

...

- Alboinus (attested 904–908)

...

- Adelardus (attested 918–929)

...

- Boso (attested 943–959)
- Petrus (attested 966–991)
- Benedictus (attested 997–1015)
- Gunfredus (attested 1017–1039)
- Guido (Wido) (attested 1042–1061)
- Herimannus (attested 1064–1073)
- Petrus (attested 1018–1099)
- Ruggero Gisalbertini (1103–1132)
- Crescentius (attested 1133–1136)
- Adimarus (Odimarus, Odalmarus) (attested 1137–1147)
- Galganus (attested 1150–1168)
- Hugo Saladini (attested 1171–1184)
- Hildebrandus (attested 1185–1211)

=== 1200 to 1500 ===
- Paganus de Ardenghesca (1212–1239)
- Galganus (1244–1251)
- Rainerius Ubertini (1251–1260)
- Albertus Scolari (1261–1269)

Sede vacante (1269–1273)

- Rainerius Ubertini (attested 1273–1301)
- Rainerius Belforti (1301–1320)
- Rainuccius Allegretti (1321–1348)
- Filippo Belforti (1348–1358)
- Almerico Chiati (1358–1361) Bishop-elect
- Pietro Corsini (18 Mar 1362 –1363)
- Andrea Cordoni (1363–1373)
- Lucius de Cagli (1374–1375)
- Simon Pagani (1375–1384)
- Onofrio Visdomini O.E.S.A. (1384–1390)
- Antonio Cipolloni (1390–1396)
- Giovanni Ricci (1396–1398)
- Luigi Aliotti (1398–1411)
- Jacopo di Scolaio degli Spini (1411)
- Stefano del Buono (1411–1435)
- Roberto Adimari (1435–1439 Resigned)
- Roberto Cavalcanti (27 Apr 1440 – 25 Feb 1450)
- Giovanni Neroni Diotisalvi (21 Feb 1450 –1462)
- Ugolino Giugni (1462–1470)
- Antonio degli Agli (1470–1477)
- Cardinal Francesco Soderini (1478–1509 Resigned)

=== 1500 to 1800 ===
- Giuliano Soderini (23 May 1509 –1514)
- Francesco della Rovere (12 Jun 1514 –1530)

Cardinal Giovanni Salviati (1530-1532 Resigned) Administrator

- Giovanni Matteo Sertori (1532–1545)
- Benedetto Nerli (22 Jun 1545 – 1565)
- Alessandro Strozzi (3 Apr 1566 – 4 Apr 1568)
- Ludovico Antinori (2 Aug 1568 –1574)
- Marco Saracini (1574)
- Guido Servidio (1574 – 1 May 1598)
- Luca Alemanni (7 Aug 1598 – Jun 1617 Resigned)
- Bernardo Inghirami (12 Jun 1617 – 5 Jun 1633)
- Niccolò Sacchetti (25 Sep 1634 – 8 Jun 1650)
- Giovanni Gerini (19 Sep 1650 –1653)
- Orazio degli Albizzi (5 Jul 1655 – 30 Jan 1676)
- Carlo Filippo Sfondrati, B. (12 Jul 1677 – 11 May 1680)
- Ottavio del Rosso (14 Apr 1681 – 31 Dec 1714)
- Lodovico Maria Pandolfini (13 Jan 1716 – 18 May 1746)
- Giuseppe Du Mesnil (6 May 1748 – 13 Mar 1781)
- Alessandro Galletti (13 Mar 1781 Succeeded – 2 Jun 1782)
- Aloisio Buonamici (23 Sep 1782 – 2 May 1791)
- Rainieri Alliata (19 Dec 1791 –1806)

=== since 1800 ===
- Giuseppe Gaetano Incontri (6 Oct 1806 – 15 Apr 1848)
- Ferdinando Baldanzi (1851–1855)
- Giuseppe Targioni (3 Aug 1857 – 17 Apr 1873)
- Ferdinando Capponi (25 Jul 1873 –1881)
- Giuseppe Gelli (27 Mar 1882 – 2 Mar 1909)
- Emanuele Mignone (29 Apr 1909 –1919)
- Raffaele Carlo Rossi, O.C.D. (22 Apr 1920 –1923)
- Dante Carlo Munerati, S.D.B. (20 Dec 1923 – 20 Dec 1942)
- Antonio Bagnoli (17 Aug 1943 –1954
- Ismaele Mario Castellano, O.P. (24 Aug 1954 – 3 Aug 1956 Resigned)
- Marino Bergonzini (12 Jan 1957 –1970)
- Roberto Carniello (7 Oct 1975 – 5 Mar 1985 Resigned)
- Vasco Giuseppe Bertelli (25 May 1985 – 18 Mar 2000 Retired)
- Mansueto Bianchi (18 Mar 2000 –2006)
- Alberto Silvani (8 May 2007 – 12 January 2022)
- Roberto Campiotti (12 January 2022 – present)

== Books ==
- Gams, Pius Bonifatius (1873). Series episcoporum Ecclesiae catholicae: quotquot innotuerunt a beato Petro apostolo. Ratisbon: Typis et Sumptibus Georgii Josephi Manz. p. 763-764. (Use with caution; obsolete)
- Eubel, Conradus, ed. (1913). Hierarchia catholica (in Latin). Vol. Tomus 1 (second ed.). Münster: Libreria Regensbergiana.
- Eubel, Conradus, ed. (1914). Hierarchia catholica (in Latin). Vol. Tomus 2 (second ed.). Münster: Libreria Regensbergiana.
- Gulik, Guilelmus (1923). Eubel, Conradus (ed.). Hierarchia catholica (in Latin). Vol. Tomus 3 (second ed.). Münster: Libreria Regensbergiana.
- Gauchat, Patritius (Patrice) (1935). Hierarchia catholica (in Latin). Vol. Tomus IV (1592-1667). Münster: Libraria Regensbergiana.
- Ritzler, Remigius; Sefrin, Pirminus (1952). Hierarchia catholica medii et recentis aevi (in Latin). Vol. Tomus V (1667-1730). Patavii: Messagero di S. Antonio.
- Ritzler, Remigius; Sefrin, Pirminus (1958). Hierarchia catholica medii et recentis aevi. Vol. Tomus VI (1730-1799). Patavii: Messagero di S. Antonio.
- Ritzler, Remigius; Sefrin, Pirminus (1968). Hierarchia Catholica medii et recentioris aevi (in Latin). Vol. VII (1800–1846). Monasterii: Libreria Regensburgiana.
- Remigius Ritzler; Pirminus Sefrin (1978). Hierarchia catholica Medii et recentioris aevi (in Latin). Vol. VIII (1846–1903). Il Messaggero di S. Antonio.
- Pięta, Zenon (2002). Hierarchia catholica medii et recentioris aevi (in Latin). Vol. IX (1903–1922). Padua: Messagero di San Antonio. ISBN 978-88-250-1000-8.

=== Studies ===
- Amidei, Gaspero (1864). Delle istorie volterrane libri due: aggiunte le biografie di molti fra i piu illustri cittadini di Volterra (in Italian). Volterra: B. Sborgi.
- Ammirato, Scipione (1637). Vescovi di Fiesole di Volterra e d'Arezzo (in Italian). Firenze: Amadore Massi.
- Cappelletti, Giuseppe (1864). Le chiese d'Italia (in Italian). Vol. decimotto (18). Venezia: G. Antonelli. pp. 181–265.
- Ceccarelli Lemut, Maria Luisa (1991). Cronotassi dei vescovi di Volterra dalle origini all' inizio del 13. secolo (in Italian). Pisa.
- Giachi, Anton Filippo (1887). Saggio di ricerche storiche sopra lo stato antico e moderno di Volterra: salla sua origine fino al tempi nostri (in Italian) (seconda ed.). Firenze-Volterra-Cecina: Sborgi. pp. 183–253. [with many documents]
- Kehr, Paul Fridolin (1908). Italia pontificia. vol. III. Berlin 1908. pp. 279–315. (in Latin)
- Lancini, Gaetano (1869). Illustrazione sulla cattedrale di Volterra. Siena: Sordo-Muti. (in Italian)
- Lanzoni, Francesco (1927), Le diocesi d'Italia dalle origini al principio del secolo VII (an. 604), Faenza 1927, pp. 559–564. (in Italian)
- Paganelli, Jacopo (2015). «Episcopus vulterranus est dominus». Il principato dei vescovi di Volterra fino a Federico II. Dissertation: University of Pisa. 2015. (in Italian)
- Paganelli, Jacopo (2015). "«Infra nostrum episcopatum et comitatum». Alcuni caratteri del principato vescovile di Volterra (IX-XIII sec.)". 2015, Rassegna Volterrana.
- Schwartz, Gerhard (1913), Die Besetzung der Bistümer Reichsitaliens unter den sächsischen und salischen Kaisern : mit den Listen der Bischöfe, 951-1122, Leipzig-Berlin 1913, pp. 223–224. (in German)
- Schneider, Fedor (1907). Regestum volaterranum: Regesten der Urkunden von Volterra (778-1303). Roma: Loescher. (in Italian)
- Ughelli, Ferdinando; Coleti, Nicolò (1717). Italia sacra: sive De episcopis Italiae et insularum adjacentium, rebusque abiis praeclare gestis... (in Latin). Vol. Tomus primus (secunda ed.). Venice: apud Sebastianum Coleti. pp. 1425–1463.
- Volpe, Gioacchino (1923). Volterra: storia di Vescovi signori, di istituti comunali, di rapporti tra stato e chiesa nelle città italiane, secoli XI-XV (in Italian). Firenze: Soc. An. Editrice "La Voce".
- Volpe, G. (1964). "Vescovi e Comune di Volterra," in: Toscana Medievale (Firenze: Sansoni 1964), pp. 143–311. (in Italian)
