= Morean War =

Conflict between the Republic of Venice and the Ottoman Empire (1684–1698)

- Part of the Great Turkish War and the Ottoman–Venetian wars
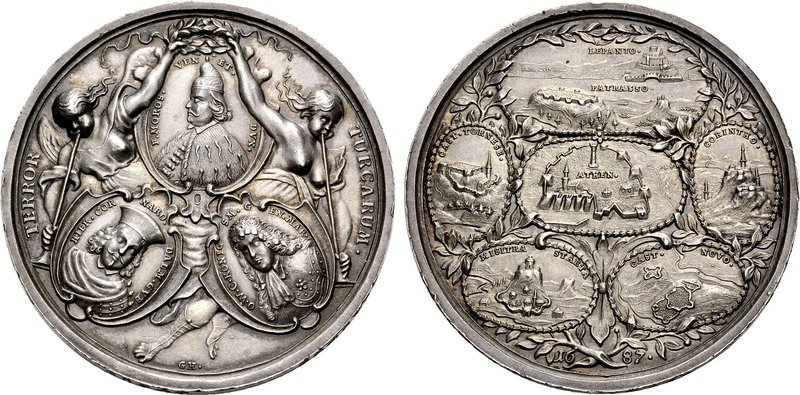
- Medal commemorating the Venetian victories in the Morean War, struck by Georg Hautsch in Nuremberg in 1687. It shows the main Venetian commanders (Francesco Morosini, Otto Wilhelm Königsmarck, Girolamo Cornaro) on the obverse, and the main fortresses captured by the Venetians on the reverse.
Date	25 April 1684 – 26 January 1699 (14 years, 9 months and 1 day)
Location	Peloponnese, southern Epirus, Central Greece, Aegean Sea, Montenegro
Result	Venetian victory
Territorial changes	Morea ceded to Venice; Venetian gains in inland Dalmatia

Belligerents
Republic of Venice Holy Roman Empire: (Duchy of Savoy) Piedmont-Savoy; Tuscany; Knights of St. Stephen; (Sovereign Military Order of Malta) Knights of Malta; Papal States; Greek rebels; Montenegrin volunteers; Mani; Morlachs	Ottoman Empire and vassals: Eyalet of Egypt; Eyalet of Tripolitania; Regency of Algiers

Commanders and leaders
(Republic of Venice) Francesco Morosini; (Republic of Venice) Girolamo Cornaro; (Republic of Venice) Hannibal von Degenfeld; (Republic of Venice) Otto Wilhelm Königsmarck; (Republic of Venice) Stojan Janković †; Bajo Pivljanin †; Pavlos Makris; Limberakis Gerakaris (early 1696 until late 1696)	(Ottoman Empire) Mehmed IV; (Ottoman Empire) Suleiman II; (Ottoman Empire) Ahmed II; (Ottoman Empire) Ismail Pasha; (Ottoman Empire) Mahmud Pasha; Mezzo Morto; Limberakis Gerakaris (1688 until early 1696)

The Morean war (Italian: Guerra di Morea), also known as the Sixth Ottoman–Venetian War, was fought between 1684–1699 as part of the wider conflict known as the "Great Turkish War", between the Republic of Venice and the Ottoman Empire. Military operations ranged from Dalmatia to the Aegean Sea, but the war's major campaign was the Venetian conquest of the Morea (Peloponnese) peninsula in Southern Greece.

On the Venetian side, the war was fought to avenge the loss of Crete in the Cretan War (1645–1669). It happened while the Ottomans were entangled in their northern struggle against the Habsburgs – beginning with the failed Ottoman attempt to conquer Vienna and ending with the Habsburgs gaining Buda and the whole of Hungary, leaving the Ottoman Empire unable to concentrate its forces against the Venetians. As such, the Morean War was the only Ottoman–Venetian conflict from which Venice emerged victorious, gaining significant territory. Venice's expansionist revival would be short-lived, as its gains would be reversed by the Ottomans in 1718.

== Background ==
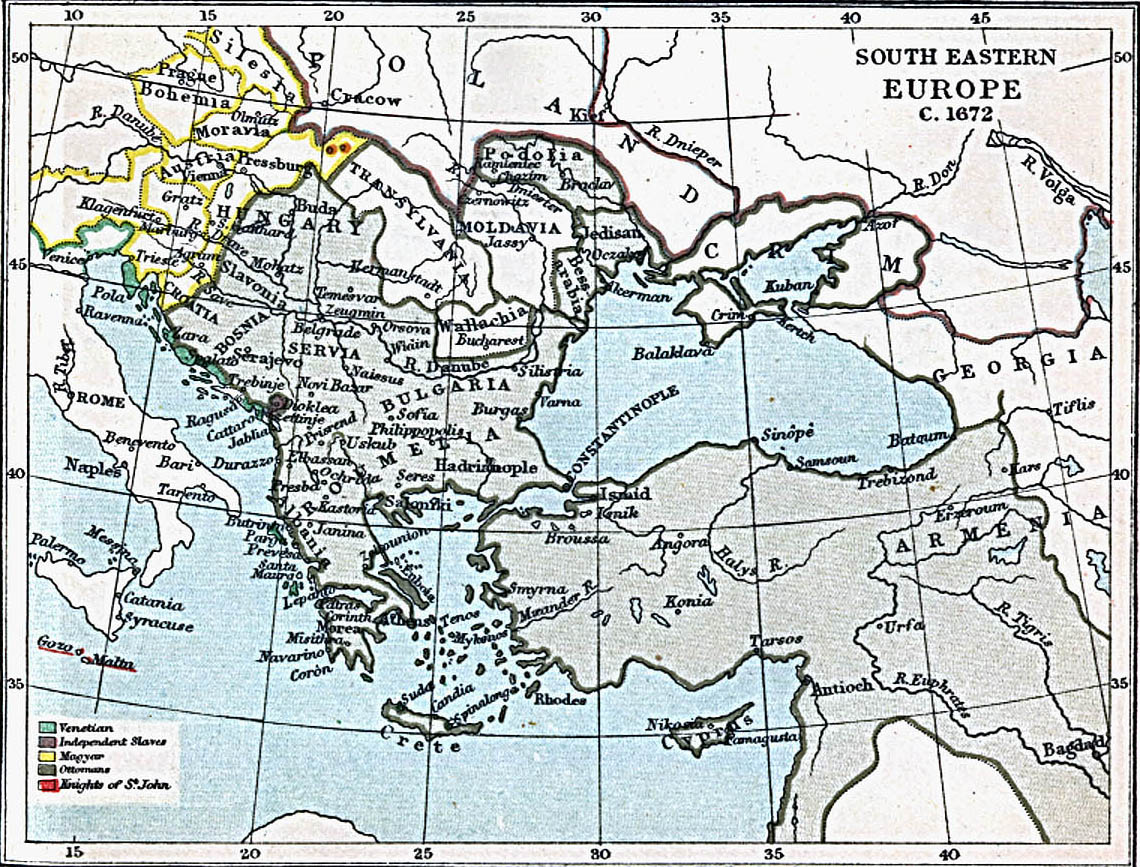
Map of south-eastern Europe c. 1670.

Venice had held several islands in the Aegean and the Ionian seas, together with strategically positioned forts along the coast of the Greek mainland since the carving up of the Byzantine Empire after the Fourth Crusade. With the rise of the Ottomans, during the 16th and early 17th centuries, the Venetians lost most of these, including Cyprus and Euboea (Negropont) to the Turks. Between 1645 and 1669, the Venetians and the Ottomans fought a long and costly war over the last major Venetian possession in the Aegean, Crete. During this war, the Venetian commander, Francesco Morosini, made contact with the rebellious Maniots. They agreed to conduct a joint campaign in the Morea. In 1659, Morosini landed in the Morea, and together with the Maniots, he took Kalamata. He was soon after forced to return to Crete, and the Peloponnesian venture failed.

During the 17th century, the Ottomans remained the premier political and military power in Europe, but signs of decline were evident: the Ottoman economy suffered from the influx of gold and silver from the Americas, an increasingly unbalanced budget and repeated devaluations of the currency, while the traditional timariot cavalry system and the Janissaries, who formed the core of the Ottoman armies, declined in quality and were increasingly replaced by irregular forces that were inferior to the regular European armies. The reform efforts of Sultan Murad IV (r. 1623–1640), and the able administration of the Köprülü dynasty of Grand Viziers, whose members governed the Empire from 1656 to 1683, managed to sustain Ottoman power and even enabled it to conquer Crete, but the long and drawn-out war there exhausted Ottoman resources.

As a result of the Polish–Ottoman War (1672–76), the Ottomans secured their last territorial expansion in Europe with the conquest of Podolia, and then tried to expand into Ukrainian territory on the right bank of the Dnieper River, but were held back by the Russians. The Treaty of Bakhchisarai made the river Dnieper the boundary between the Ottoman Empire and Russia.

In 1683, a new war broke out between Austria and the Ottomans, with a large Ottoman army advancing towards Vienna. The Ottoman siege was broken in the Battle of Vienna by the King of Poland, Jan Sobieski. As a result, an anti-Ottoman Holy League was formed at Linz on 5 March 1684 between Emperor Leopold I, Sobieski, and the Doge of Venice, Marcantonio Giustinian. Over the next few years, the Austrians recovered Hungary from Ottoman control, and even captured Belgrade in 1688 and reached as far as Niš and Vidin in the next year. The Austrians were now overextended, as well as being embroiled in the Nine Years' War (1688–97) against France. The Ottomans, under another Köprülü Grand Vizier, Fazıl Mustafa Pasha, regained the initiative and pushed the Austrians back, recovering Niš and Vidin in 1690 and launching raids across the Danube. After 1696, the tide turned again, with the capture of Azov by the Russians in 1696 followed by a disastrous defeat at the hands of Eugene of Savoy at the battle of Zenta in September 1697. In its aftermath, negotiations began between the warring parties, leading to the signing of the Treaty of Karlowitz in 1699.

== Venice prepares for war ==
The Austrians and Poles considered Venetian participation in the war as a useful adjunct to the main operations in Central Europe, as its navy could impede the Ottomans from concentrating their forces by sea and force them to divert forces away from their own fronts. Other than that, the allies' esteem for Venetian capabilities was low, as the Republic's power was in evident decline; indeed it was precisely the retreat of Venetian influence in Italy and the Adriatic that enabled a rapprochement between Vienna and Venice, hitherto rivals in these areas. On the Venetian side, the debate in the Senate about joining the war was heated, but in the end the war party prevailed, judging the moment as an excellent and unique opportunity for a revanche. As a result, when news arrived in Venice on 25 April 1684 of the signing of the Holy League, for the first and only time in the Ottoman–Venetian Wars, the Most Serene Republic declared war on the Ottomans, rather than the other way around.

Nevertheless, at the outbreak of the war, the military forces of the Republic were meagre. The long Cretan War had exhausted Venetian resources, and Venetian power was in decline in Italy as well as the Adriatic Sea. While the Venetian navy was a well-maintained force, comprising ten galleasses, thirty men-of-war, and thirty galleys, as well as auxiliary vessels, the army comprised 8,000 not very disciplined regular troops. They were complemented by a numerous and well-equipped militia, but the latter could not be used outside Italy. Revenue was also scarce, at little more than two million sequins a year. Venice received considerable subsidies from Pope Innocent XI, who played a leading role in forming the Holy League and, according to the historian Peter Topping, "nearly impoverished the Curia in raising subsidies for the allies".

According to the reports of the English ambassador to the Porte, Lord Chandos, the Ottomans' position was even worse: on land they were reeling from a succession of defeats, so that the Sultan had to double the pay of his troops and resort to forcible conscription. At the same time, the Ottoman navy was described by European observers like Chandos, Luigi Ferdinando Marsili and Paul Rycaut as being in a sore state, both numerically and qualitatively; the Moldavian prince Demetrius Cantemir reports that the fleet scarcely had six men-of-war ready for operations, and was about to bring ten further to the Imperial Arsenal to be fitted out for war. However, the Ottomans could also count on the assistance of the fleets of their vassals, the Barbary states. The Venetians on the other hand mobilized a fleet of 28 galleys, six galeasses, one bastard galley (as the flagship) and 12 men-of-war.

This left the Venetians with an uncontested supremacy at sea, while the Ottomans resorted to using light and fast galleys to evade the Venetian fleet and resupply their fortresses along the coasts. The Ottomans believed that the Venetians would target Crete, and already before the outbreak of hostilities sent their chief admiral, the Kapudan Pasha, to the island with 40 galleys carrying reinforcements and provisions for the island's garrison. In view of its financial weakness, Venice determined to bring the war to Ottoman territory, where they could conscript and extract tribute at will, before the Ottomans could recover from the shock and losses incurred at Vienna and reinforce their positions. Despite some thoughts of directing the Venetian assault against Castelnuovo (Herceg Novi in Montenegro), in the end it was decided to leave the matter to the decision of the commander-in-chief.

Morosini, having a distinguished record and great experience of operations in Greece, was chosen as Captain General of the Sea and commander-in-chief of the expeditionary force. His chief rival, Girolamo Cornaro, was named Provveditore Generale da Mar, Alvise Pasqualigo as provveditore generale in Dalmatia and other senior patricians were appointed to posts in the fleet squadrons. Venice increased her forces by enrolling large numbers of mercenaries from Italy and the German states, and raised funds by selling state offices and titles of nobility. Financial and military aid in men and ships was secured from the Knights of Malta, the Duchy of Savoy, the Papal States and the Knights of St. Stephen of Tuscany, and experienced Austrian officers were seconded to the Venetian army. In addition to the aid supplied by the Knights of St. Stephen, the grand duke of Tuscany also sent to Morea about 3,000 soldiers in four contingents from 1684 to 1688, plus 14 ships and their attendant sailors (8 galleys, 4 galiots, 2 other vessels). In the Venetian-ruled Ionian Islands, similar measures were undertaken; over 2,000 soldiers, apart from sailors and rowers for the fleet, were recruited. On 10 June 1684, Morosini set sail from Venice, and sailed to Corfu, where he was joined by Venice's allies: five Papal galleys under Paolo Emilio Malaspina, four galleys and a man-of-war from Tuscany under Camillo Guidi, and seven galleys and three men-of-war of the Knights of Malta, under Giovanni Battista Brancaccio.

== Venetian offensive ==
=== Operations in western Greece (1684) ===
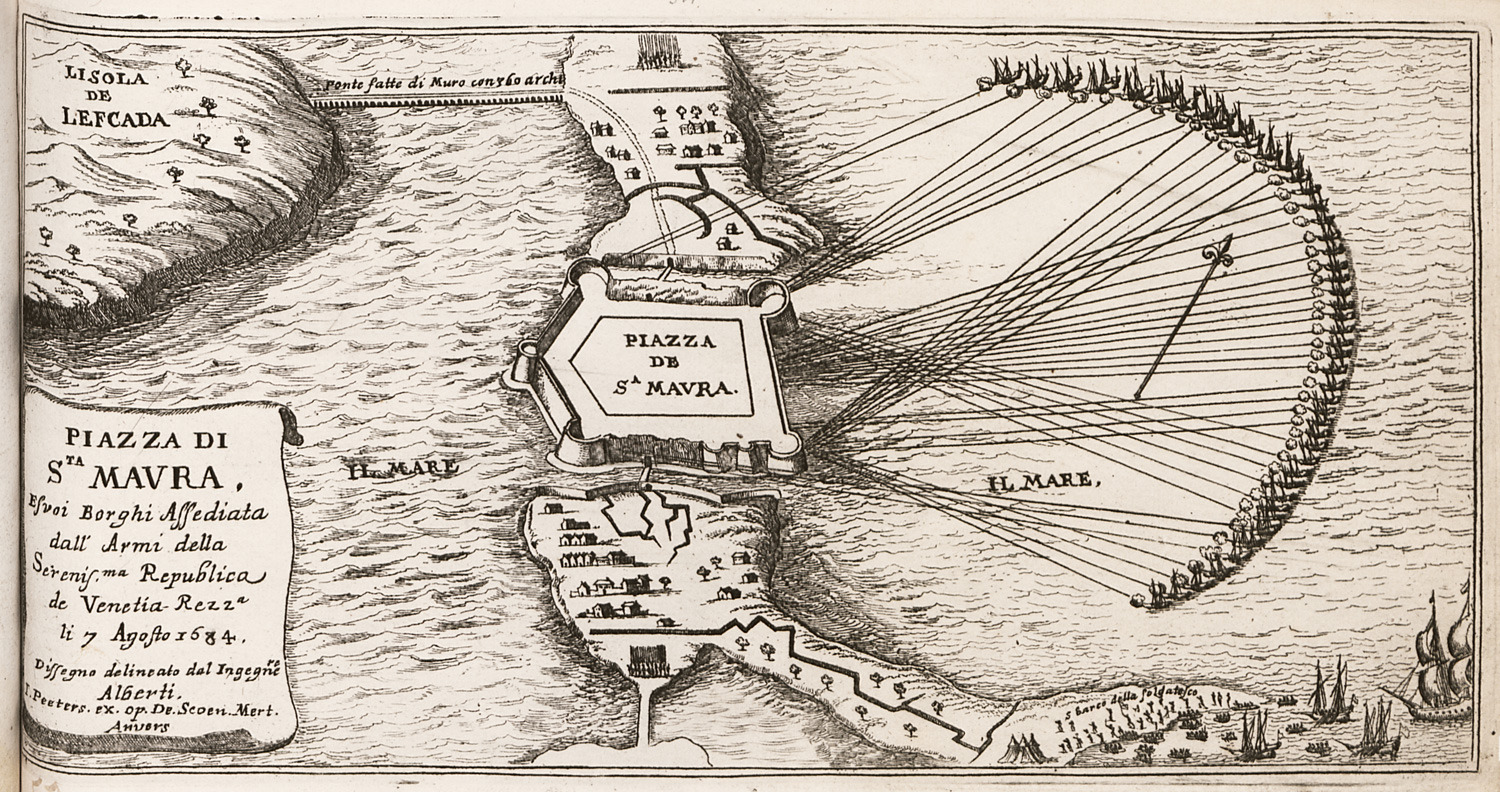
Sketch of the Siege of Santa Maura, by Jacob Peeters

The first target of the Venetian fleet was the island of Lefkada (Santa Maura). Morosini's political rival, Girolamo Cornaro, tried to preempt him and seize the Castle of Santa Maura, which he believed to be lightly defended, before the arrival of the fleet from Venice. With a small force he sailed from Corfu to the island, but finding the fortress strongly garrisoned, he turned back. As a result of this misadventure, Cornaro was sidelined for the first year of the war, during which he served as governor of the Ionian Islands, before he was appointed to command in Dalmatia in late 1685. Once Morosini arrived at Corfu, he and the council of his commanders decided to resume the failed enterprise, so as to at least eliminate the island as a base for piracy. No definite plans were made after that, with Morosini envisaging an assault on Negroponte (Chalkis) with a view towards gaining a base of operations in the Aegean, or alternatively focusing on capturing the coast of Albania. On 18 July 1684, the fleet left Corfu, receiving a papal benediction by the local Catholic bishop, Marcantonio Barbarigo, a rite normally associated with the departure of a crusade. Two days later, the fleet arrived at Santa Maura. After a siege of 16 days, the fortress capitulated on 6 August 1684.

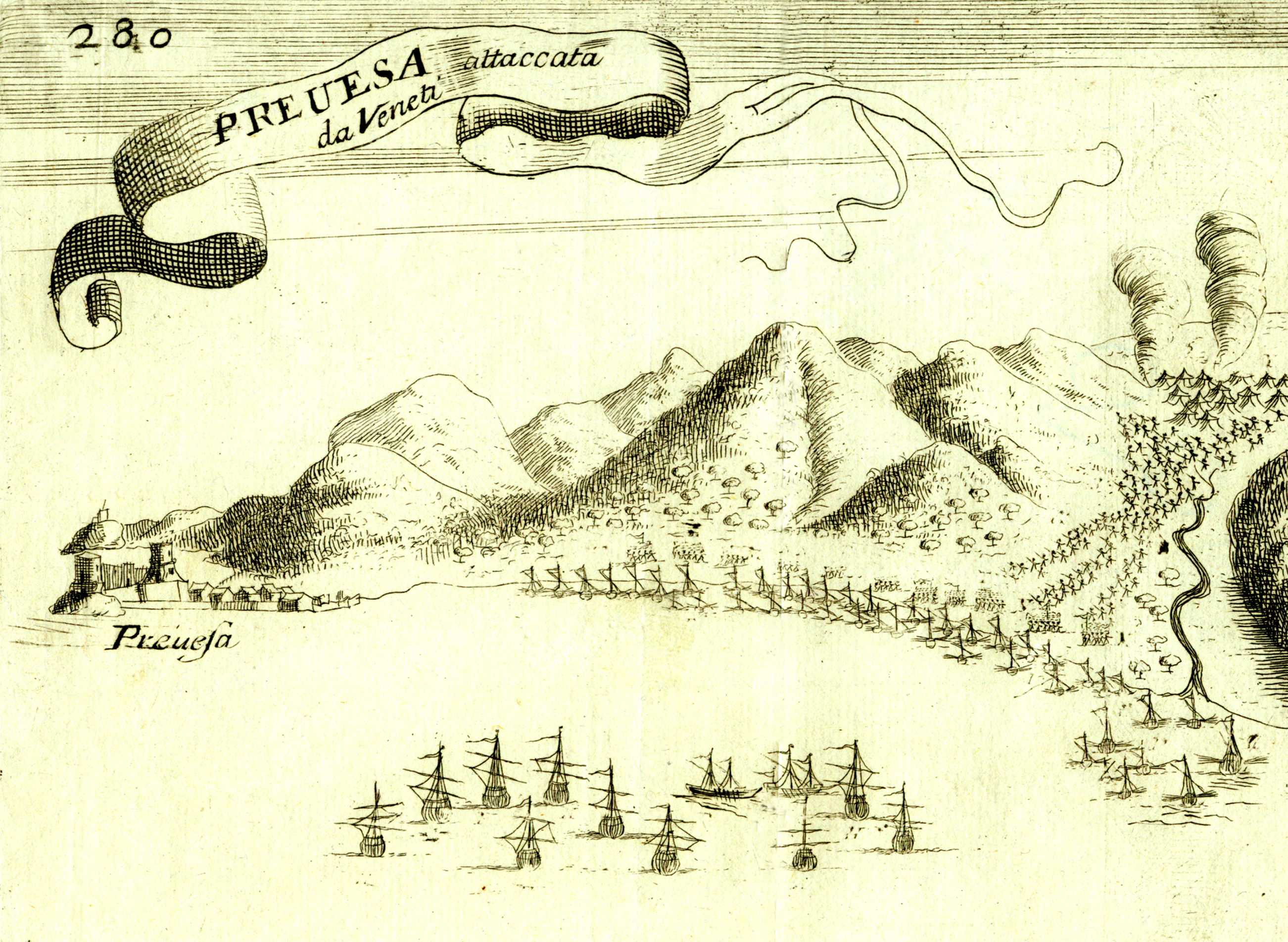
Engraving of the Venetian attack on Preveza, by Vincenzo Coronelli

The Venetians then crossed onto the mainland region of Acarnania. The offshore island of Petalas was occupied on 10 August by Count Niccolo di Strassoldo and Angelo Delladecima. Reinforced with volunteers, mostly from Cephalonia, the Venetians then captured the towns of Aitoliko and Missolonghi. Greek leaders from across Epirus, from Himarra and Souli and the armatoloi captains of Acarnania and Agrafa, had contacted the Venetians with proposals for a common cause; with the Venetian advance, a general rising occurred in the area of Valtos and Xiromero. Muslim villages were attacked, looted, and torched, and Ottoman rule collapsed across western Continental Greece. By the end of the month the Ottomans only held on to the coastal fortresses of Preveza and Vonitsa. The Venetian fleet engaged in raids along the coast of Epirus up to Igoumenitsa and even on the north-western coast of the Peloponnese, near Patras, before launching a concerted effort to capture the castle of Preveza on 21 September. The castle surrendered after eight days, and Vonitsa was captured by Delladecima's men a few days later. At the end of autumn, Morosini appointed Delladecima as military governor of the region stretching from the Gulf of Ambracia to the river Acheloos. Already in this early part of the war, the Venetians began suffering great casualties on account of disease; Count Strassoldo was one of them. These early successes were important for the Venetians because they secured their communications with Venice, denied to the Ottomans the possibility of moving troops through the area, and provided a springboard for possible future conquests on the Greek mainland.

At the same time, Venice set about providing Morosini with more troops, and concluded treaties with the rulers of Saxony and Hannover, who were to provide contingents of 2,400 men each as mercenaries. After the treaty was signed in December 1684, 2,500 Hannoverians joined Morosini in June 1685, while 3,300 Saxons arrived a few months later. In spring and early June 1685, the Venetian forces gathered at Corfu, Preveza, and Dragamesto: 37 galleys (17 of which Tuscan, Papal, or Maltese), 5 galleasses, 19 sailing ships, and 12 galleots, 6,400 Venetian troops (2,400 Hannoverians and 1,000 Dalmatians), 1,000 Maltese troops, 300 Florentines, and 400 Papal soldiers. To them were added a few hundred conscripted and volunteer Greeks from the Ionian Islands and the mainland.

=== Conquest of the Morea (1685–87) ===
==== Coron and Mani (1685) ====
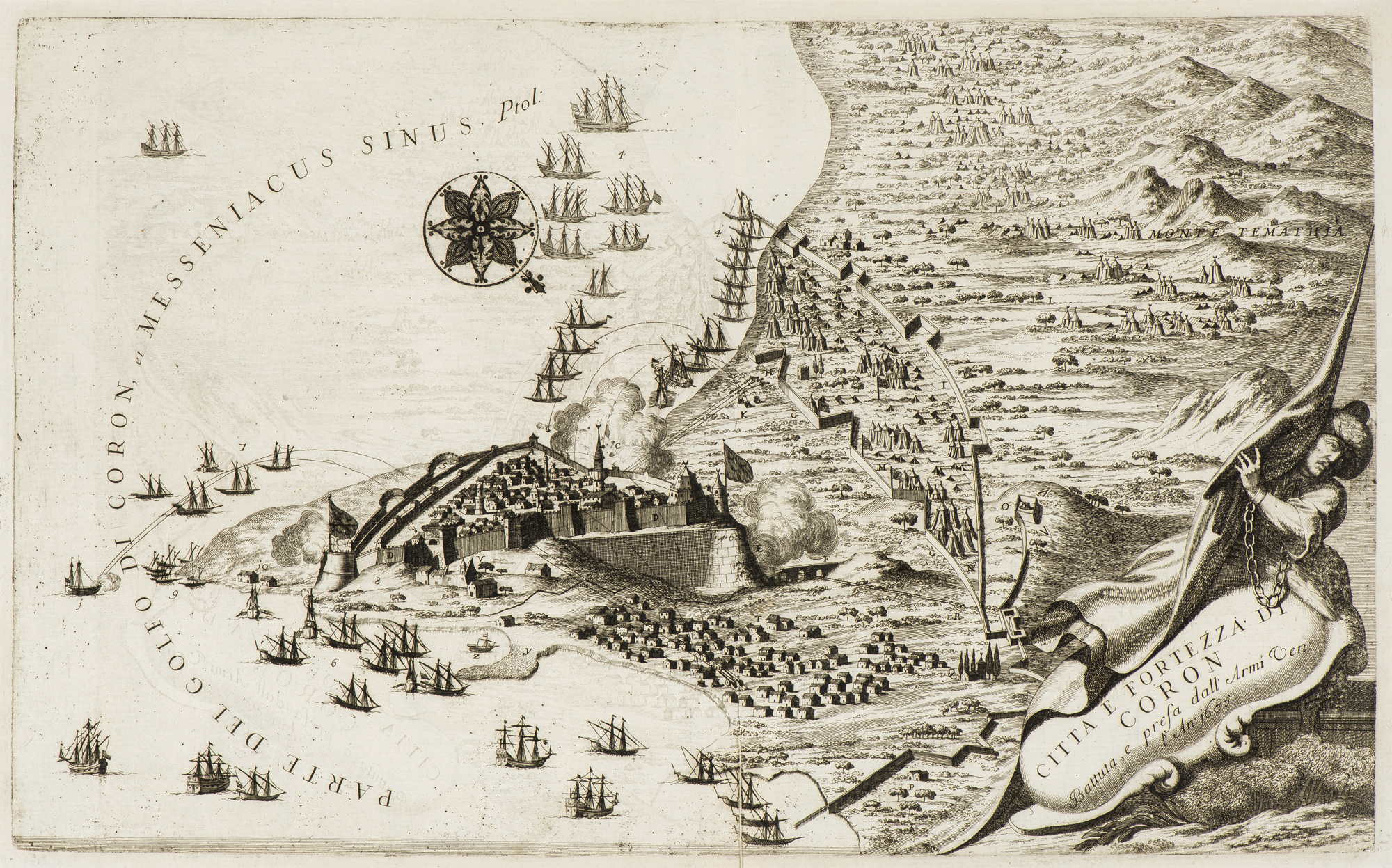
The Siege of Coron, depicted by Vincenzo Coronelli

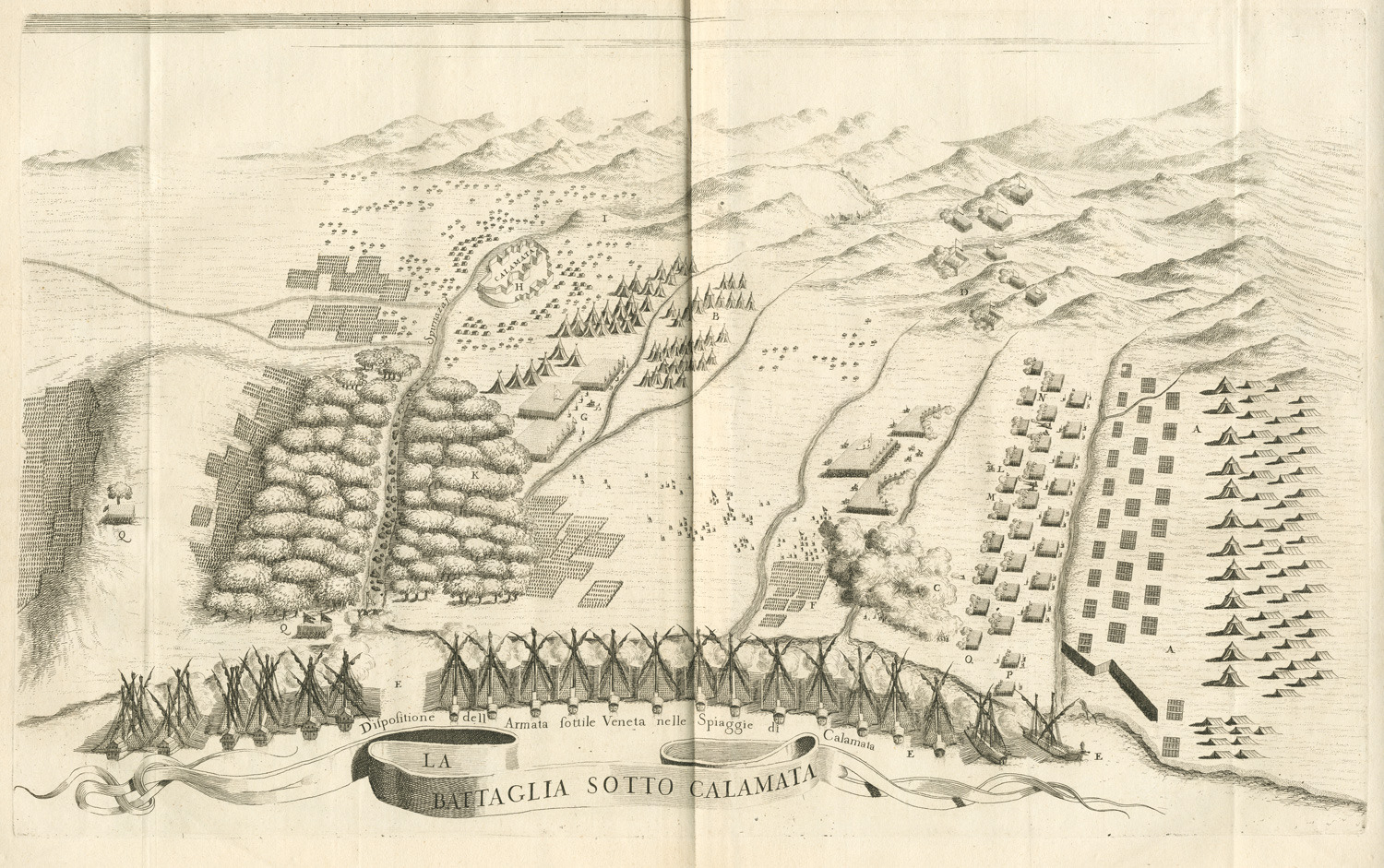
The Battle of Kalamata, by Vincenzo Coronelli

Having secured his rear during the previous year, Morosini set his sights upon the Peloponnese, where the Greeks had begun showing signs of revolt. Already in spring 1684, the Ottoman authorities had arrested and executed the Metropolitan of Corinth, Zacharias, for participating in revolutionary circles. At the same time, insurrectionist movements began among the Maniots, who resented the loss of privileges and autonomy, including the establishment of Ottoman garrisons in the fortresses of Zarnata, Kelefa, and Passavas, that they had suffered due to their collaboration with the Venetians in the Cretan War. In early autumn, an assembly under the presidency of the local bishop, Joachim, decided to approach the Venetians for aid, and on 20 October, a ten-man embassy arrived at Zakynthos to treat with Morosini. The discussions dragged on until February 1685, when at last the Venetian commander-in-chief resolved to supply the Maniots with quantities of guns and ammunition. In the meantime, the Ottoman authorities had not been idle. Already in the preceding months they had reinforced their troops in Laconia, and in February the new serasker (Ottoman commander-in-chief) of the Morea, Ismail Pasha, invaded the Mani peninsula with 10,000 men. The Maniots resisted, but their renewed pleas for aid to the Venetians in early March resulted only in the dispatch of four ships with ammunition under Daniel Dolfin. As a result, the Maniots were forced to submit, and gave up their children as hostages to the serasker.

At long last, on 21 June the Venetian fleet set sail for the Peloponnese, and on 25 June, the Venetian army, over 8,000 men strong, landed outside the former Venetian fort of Coron (Koroni) and laid siege to it. The Maniots remained passive at first, and for a time the position of the besieging Christian troops was threatened by the troops led by the governor of Lepanto, Halil Pasha, and the fresh reinforcements disembarked by the Ottoman fleet under the Kapudan Pasha, both at Nauplia and at Kalamata. The Ottoman efforts to break the siege were defeated, and on 11 August, the fortress surrendered. During the negotiations, the garrison was massacred due to suspicion of treachery.

In the final stage of the siege, 230 Maniots under the Zakynthian noble Pavlos Makris had taken part, and soon the area rose up in revolt again, encouraged by Morosini's presence at Coron. The Venetian commander now targeted Kalamata, where the Kapudan Pasha had landed 6,000 infantry and 2,000 sipahi cavalry, and established an entrenched camp. On 10 September, the Venetians and Maniots obtained the surrender of the fortress of Zarnata, its garrison of 600 being allowed safe passage to Kalamata, but its commander retiring to Venice and a rich pension. After the Kapudan Pasha rejected an offer of Morisini to disperse his army, the Venetian army, reinforced by 3,300 Saxons and under the command of general Hannibal von Degenfeld, attacked the Ottoman camp and defeated them on 14 September. Kalamata surrendered without a fight and its castle was razed, and by the end of September the remaining Ottoman garrisons in Kelefa and Passavas had capitulated and evacuated Mani. Passavas was razed, but the Venetians in turn installed their own garrisons in Kelefa and Zarnata, as well as the offshore island of Marathonisi, to keep an eye on the unruly Maniots, before returning to the Ionian Islands to winter.

The campaigning season was concluded with the capture and razing of Igoumenitsa on 11 November. Once again, disease took its toll among the Venetian army in its winter quarters. Losses were particularly heavy among the German contingents, which complained about the negligence shown to them by the Venetian authorities, and the often spoiled food they were sent: the Hannoverians alone lost 736 men to disease in the period from April 1685 to January 1686, as opposed to 256 in battle.

==== Navarino, Modon, and Nauplia (1686) ====
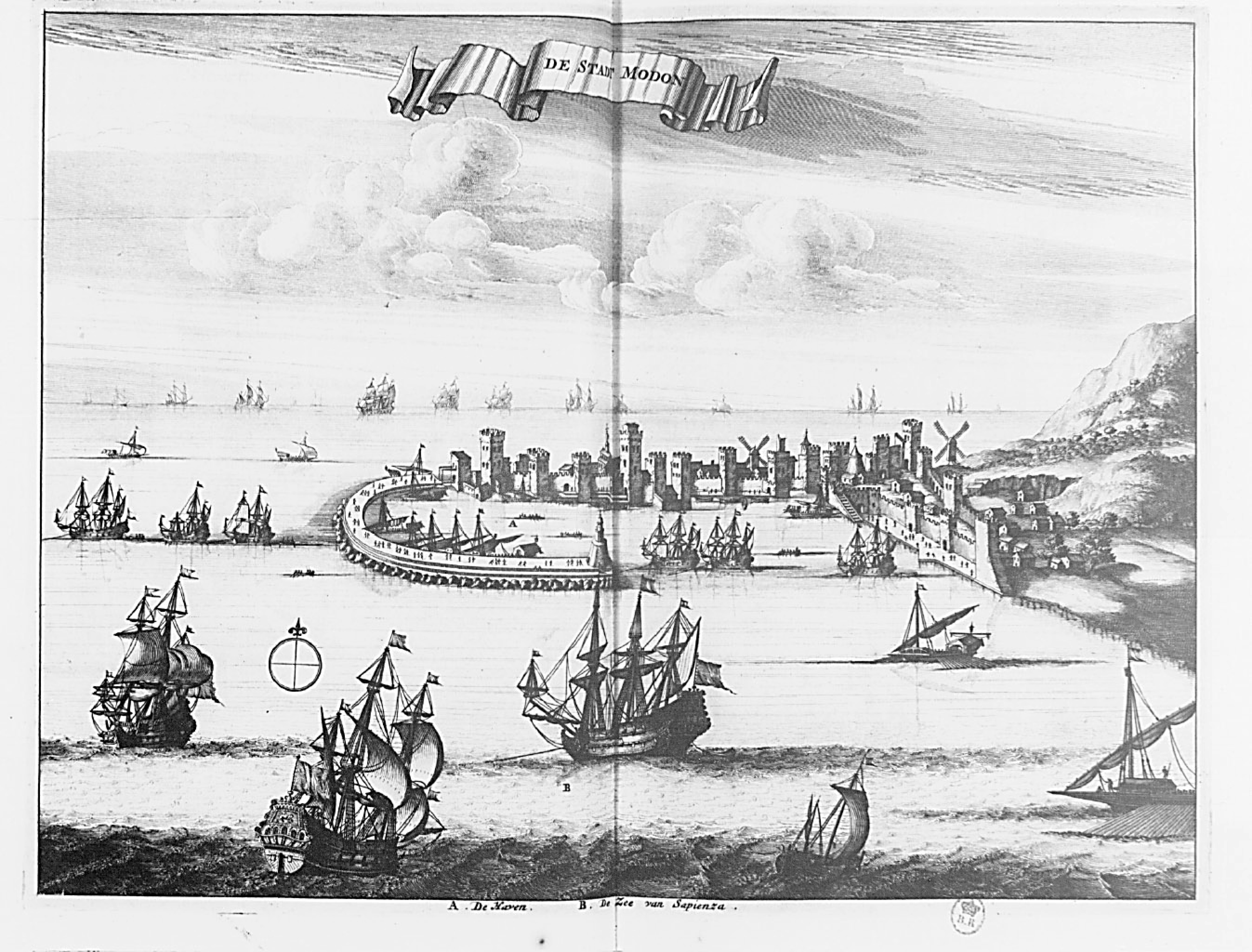
View of the fortress and harbour of Modon in 1688

In the next year, the Ottomans seized the initiative by attacking Kelefa in early March, forcing Morosini to hasten his departure from the Ionian Islands. The Ottomans raised the siege and withdrew at the arrival of a Venetian fleet under Venieri, and on 30 March, Morosini began landing his troops in the Messenian Gulf. The Venetian forces were slow to assemble, and Morosini had to await the arrival of reinforcements in the form of 13 galleys from the Papal States and the Grand Duchy of Tuscany, as well as further mercenaries, which raised his army to some 10,000 foot and 1,000 horse, before commencing his advance in late May. Following a recommendation by Morosini himself, the veteran Swedish marshal Otto Wilhelm Königsmarck was appointed head of the land forces, while Morosini retained command of the fleet. Königsmarck also requested, and was granted, that the Venetians hire several other experienced officers, particularly experts in siege warfare.

On 2 June, Königsmarck landed his army at Pylos, where the Old Navarino castle surrendered the next day, after the aqueduct providing its water supply was cut. Its garrison, comprising black Africans, was transported to Alexandria. The more modern fortress of New Navarino was also besieged and surrendered on 14 June, after one of its magazines exploded, killing its commander, Sefer Pasa, and many of his senior officers. Its garrison, 1,500 soldiers and a like number of civilian dependents, were transported to Tripoli. Attempts by the Ottoman serasker to relieve the fortress or impede the Venetians ended in a defeat in battle, after which the Venetians moved to blockade and besiege another former Venetian stronghold, Modon (Methoni), on 22 June. Although well fortified, supplied, and equipped with a hundred guns and a thousand-strong garrison, the fort surrendered on 7 July, after sustained bombardment and successive Venetian assaults. Its population of 4,000 was likewise transported to Tripoli. At the same time, a Venetian squadron and Dalmatian troops captured the fort of Arkadia (modern Kyparissia) further north.

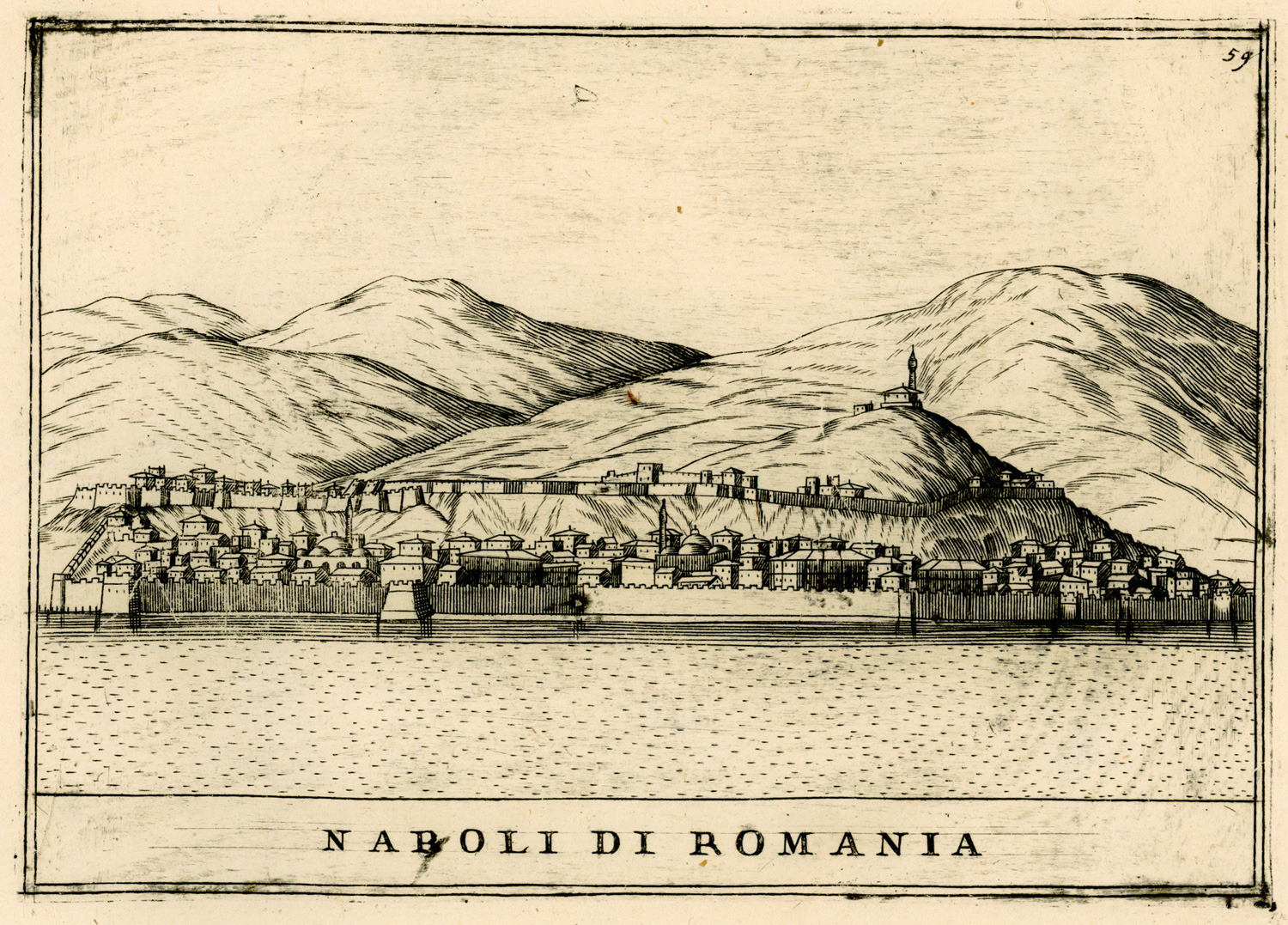
View of Nauplia from the sea, with the heights of Palamidi in the background, by Vincenzo Coronelli

The Venetians then, in a lightning move, retired their field army from Messenia and landed it at Tolo between 30 July and 4 August, within striking distance of the capital of the Peloponnese, Nauplia. On the very first day, Königsmarck led his troops to capture the hill of Palamidi, then only poorly fortified, which overlooked the town. The commander of the city, Mustapha Pasha, moved the civilians to the citadel of Akronauplia, and sent urgent messages to the serasker Ismail Pasha for aid; before the Venetians managed to complete their disembarkation, Ismail Pasha arrived at Argos with 4,000 horse and 3,000 foot, and tried to assist the besieged garrison. The Venetians launched an assault against the relief army on 7 August that succeeded in taking Argos and forcing the pasha to retreat to Corinth, but for two weeks, from 16 August, Königsmarck's forces were forced to continuously repulse attacks from Ismail Pasha's forces, fight off the sorties of the besieged garrison, and cope with a new outbreak of the plague – the Hannoverians counted 1,200 out of 2,750 men as sick and wounded. On 29 August Ismail Pasha launched a large-scale attack against the Venetian camp, but was heavily defeated after Morosini landed 2,000 men from the fleet on his flank. Mustapha Pasha surrendered the city on the same day, and on the next day, Morosini staged a triumphal entry in the city. The city's seven thousand Muslims, including the garrison, were transported to Tenedos. News of this major victory was greeted in Venice with joy and celebration. Nauplia became the Venetians' major base, while Ismail Pasha withdrew to Vostitsa in the northern Peloponnese after strengthening the garrisons at Corinth, which controlled the passage to Central Greece. The Ottoman forces elsewhere fell into disarray when false rumours circulated that the Sultan had ordered the Peloponnese evacuated; thus at Karytaina Ottoman troops killed their commander and dispersed.

The Ottoman fleet, under the Kapudan Pasha, which had arrived in the Saronic Gulf to reinforce the Ottoman positions in Corinth, was forced by these news to turn back to its base in the Dardanelles. In early October, Morosini led his own ships in a vain search for the Ottoman fleet; as part of this expedition, Morosini landed at the Piraeus, where he was met by the Metropolitan of Athens, Jacob, and notables of the town, who offered him 9,000 reales as tribute. After visiting Salamis, Aegina, and Hydra, Morosini returned with the fleet to the bay of Nauplia on 16 October. At about the same time, the dissatisfaction among the German mercenaries, due to their losses to disease and the perceived neglect in the sharing of spoils, reached its peak, and many, including the entire Saxon contingent, returned home. Nevertheless, Venice was able to make up the losses by a new recruitment drive in Hesse, Württemberg, and Hannover. Due to the imminent outbreak of the Nine Years' War and the general demand for mercenaries, most of the new recruits were not veteran soldiers; the recruiters were even forced to recruit French deserters, and over 200 men deserted in turn during the march to Venice. Once again, the need to await reinforcement delayed the start of Venetian operations in 1687 until July.

==== Patras and the completion of the conquest (1687) ====
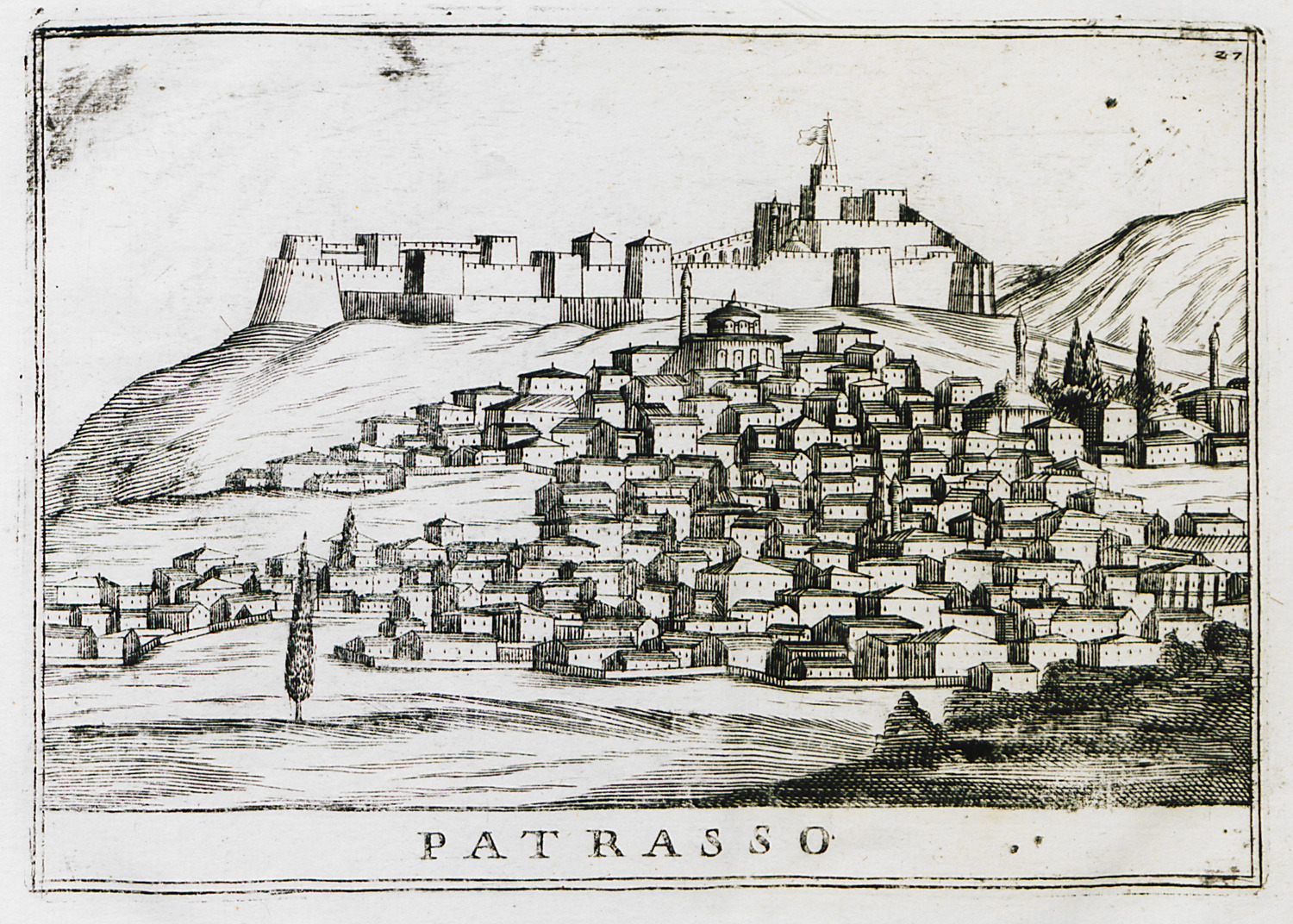
View of Patras in 1708, by Vincenzo Coronelli

In the meantime, the Ottomans had formed a strong entrenched camp at Patras, with 10,000 men under Mehmed Pasha. As the Ottomans were resupplied from across the Corinthian Gulf by small vessels, Morosini's first step was to institute a naval blockade of the northern Peloponnesian coast. Then, on 22 July, Morosini landed the first of his 14,000 troops west of Patras. Two days later, after the bulk of the Venetian forces had landed, Königsmarck led his army to attack the Ottoman camp, choosing a weak spot in its defences. The Ottomans fought valiantly, but by the end of the day, they were forced to retreat, leaving behind over 2,000 dead and wounded, 160 guns and many supplies, 14 ships, and their commander's own flag. The defeat demoralized the Ottoman garrison of Patras Castle, which abandoned it and fled to the fortress of Rio (the "Castle of the Morea"). The next day, with Venetian ships patrolling off the shore, Mehmed and his troops abandoned Rio as well and fled east. The retreat quickly degenerated into a panic, which was often joined by the Greek villagers, and which spread on the same day to the mainland across the Corinthian Gulf as well. Thus within a single day, 25 July, the Venetians were able to capture, without opposition, the twin forts of Rio and Antirrio (the "Little Dardanelles") and the castle of Naupaktos (Lepanto). The Ottomans halted their retreat only at Thebes, where Mehmed Pasha set about regrouping his forces.

The Venetians followed up this success with the reduction of the last Ottoman bastions in the Peloponnese: Chlemoutsi surrendered to Angelo De Negri from Zakynthos on 27 July, while Königsmarck marched east towards Corinth. The Ottoman garrison abandoned the Acrocorinth at his approach after torching the town, which was captured by the Venetians on 7 August. Morosini now gave orders for the preparation of a campaign across the Isthmus of Corinth towards Athens, before going to Mystras, where he persuaded the Ottoman garrison to surrender, and the Maniots occupied Karytaina, abandoned by its Ottoman garrison. The Peloponnese was under complete Venetian control, and only the fort of Monemvasia (Malvasia) in the southeast, which was placed under siege on 3 September, continued to resist, holding out until 1690. These new successes caused great joy in Venice, and honours were heaped on Morosini and his officers. Morosini received the victory title "Peloponnesiacus", and a bronze bust of his was displayed in the Hall of the Great Council of Venice, something never before done for a living citizen. Königsmarck was rewarded with 6,000 ducats in a gold basin and a pay rise to 24,000 ducats a year, Maximilian William of Brunswick-Lüneburg, who commanded the Hannoverian troops, received a jewelled sword valued at 4,000 ducats, and similar gifts were made to many officers in the army.

=== Occupation of Athens (1687–88) ===
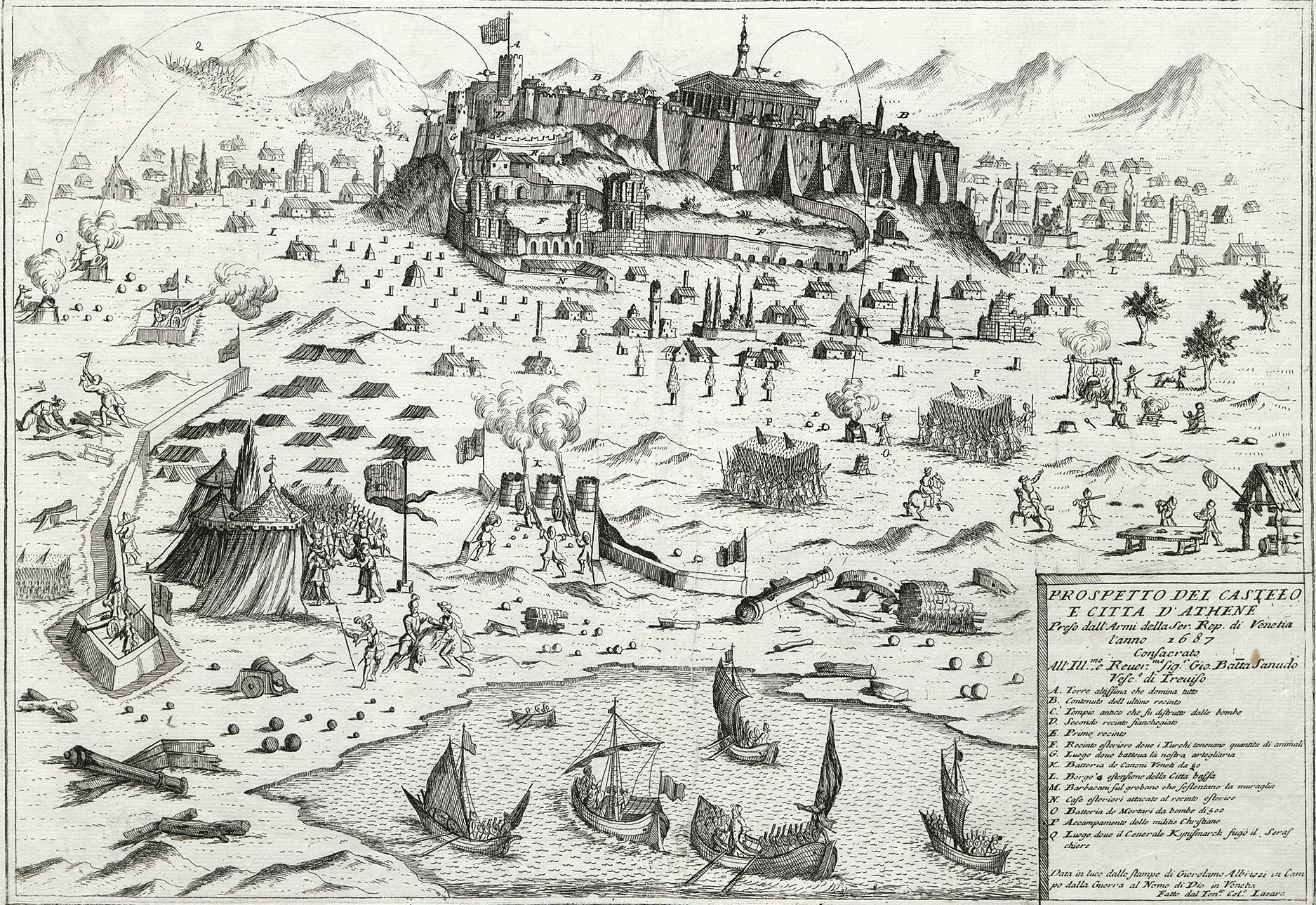
Engraving depicting the Venetian siege of the Acropolis of Athens, September 1687. The trajectory of the shell that hit the Parthenon, causing its explosion, is marked.

The Venetian position in the Peloponnese could not be secure as long as the Ottomans held onto eastern Central Greece, where Thebes and Negroponte (Chalkis) were significant military strongholds. Thus, on 21 September 1687, Königsmarck's army, 10,750 men strong, landed at Eleusis, while the Venetian fleet entered Piraeus. The Turks quickly evacuated the town of Athens, but the garrison and much of the population withdrew to the ancient Acropolis of Athens, determined to hold out until reinforcements arrived from Thebes. The Venetian army set up cannon and mortar batteries on the Pnyx and other heights around the city and began a siege of the Acropolis, which would last six days (23–29 September) and would cause much destruction to the ancient monuments. The Ottomans first demolished the Temple of Athena Nike to erect a cannon battery, and on 25 September, a Venetian cannonball exploded a powder magazine in the Propylaea. The most important damage caused was the destruction of the Parthenon. The Turks used the temple for ammunition storage, and when, on the evening of 26 September 1687, a mortar shell hit the building, the resulting explosion killed 300 people and led to the complete destruction of the temple's roof and most of the walls. Despite the enormous destruction caused by the "miraculous shot", as Morosini called it, the Turks continued to defend the fort until a relief attempt from the Ottoman army from Thebes was repulsed by Königsmarck on 28 September. The garrison then capitulated, on condition of being transported to Smyrna.

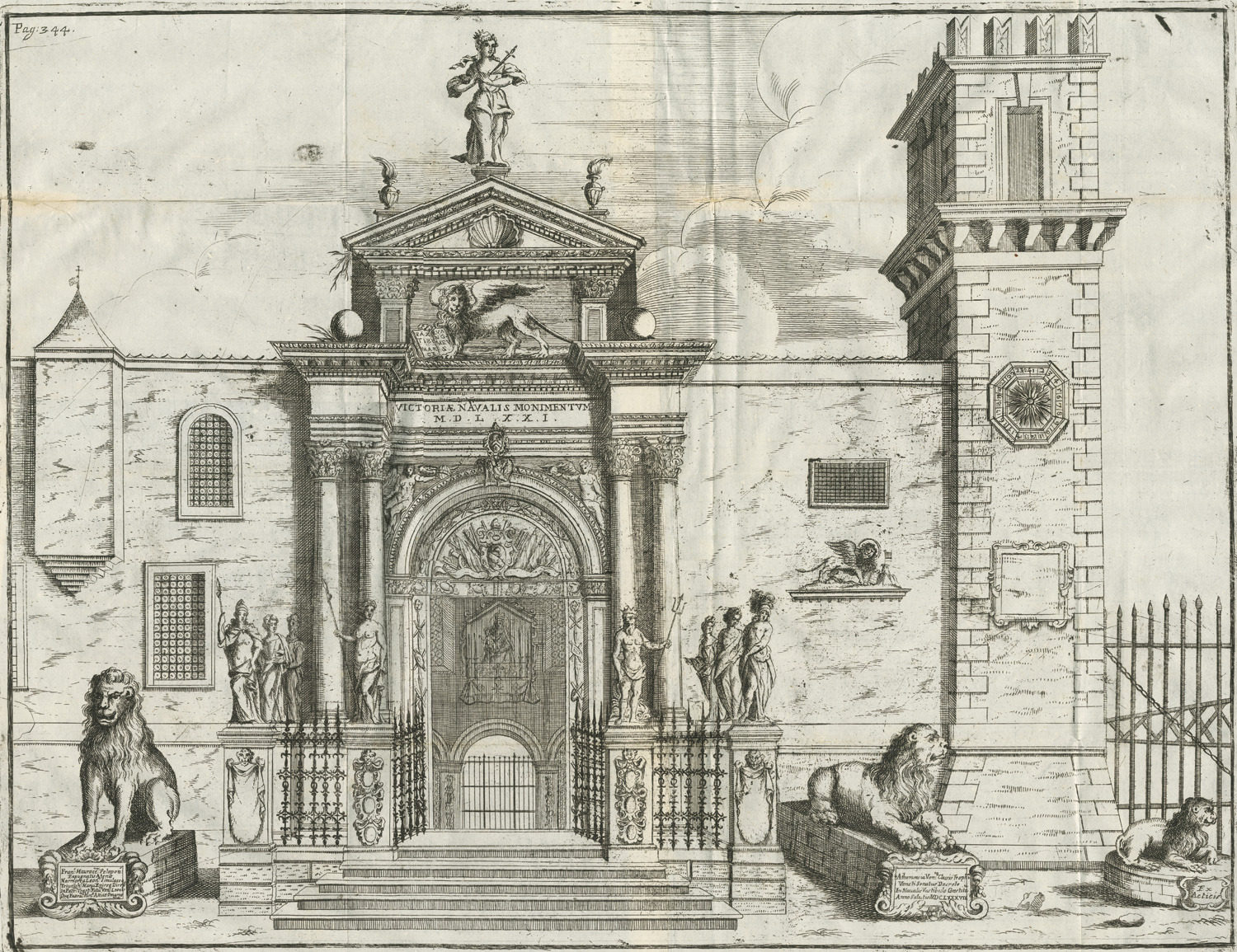
The triumphal entrance to the Arsenal of Venice, built between 1692 and 1694, with the lion statues brought by Morosini from the Piraeus.

Despite the fall of Athens, Morosini's position was not secure. The Ottomans were amassing an army at Thebes, and their 2,000-strong cavalry effectively controlled Attica, limiting the Venetians to the environs of Athens, so that the Venetians had to establish forts to secure the road linking Athens to Piraeus. On 26 December, the 1,400-strong remnant of the Hannoverian contingent departed, and a new outbreak of the plague during the winter further weakened the Venetian forces. The Venetians managed to recruit 500 Arvanites from the rural population of Attica as soldiers, but no other Greeks were willing to join the Venetian army. In a council on 31 December, it was decided to abandon Athens and focus on other projects, such as the conquest of Negroponte. A camp was fortified at the Munychia to cover the evacuation, and it was suggested, but not agreed on, that the walls of the Acropolis should be razed. As the Venetian preparations to leave became evident, many Athenians chose to leave, fearing Ottoman reprisals: 622 families, some 4,000–5,000 people, were evacuated by Venetian ships and settled as colonists in Argolis, Corinthia, Patras, and Aegean islands. Morosini decided to at least take back a few ancient monuments as spoils, but on 19 March the statues of Poseidon and the chariot of Nike fell down and smashed into pieces as they were being removed from the western pediment of the Parthenon. The Venetians abandoned the attempt to remove further sculptures from the temple, and instead took a few marble lions, including the famous Piraeus Lion, which had given the harbour its medieval name "Porto Leone", and which today stands at the entrance of the Venetian Arsenal. On 10 April, the Venetians evacuated Attica for the Peloponnese.

=== Attack on Negroponte (1688) ===
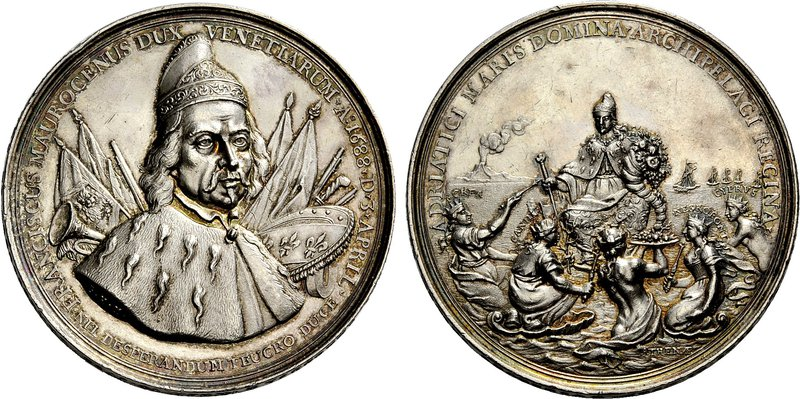
Medal struck in Nuremberg in 1688 in honour of Morosini's conquest of the Morea and his election as Doge of Venice

On 3 April 1688, Morosini was elected as the new Doge of Venice, but retained command of the Venetian forces in Greece. The Senate made great efforts to replenish its forces in Greece, but once again, the need to await the expected reinforcements delayed the start of operations until the end of June. Despite the failure of the Athens expedition, the fortunes of war were still favourable: the Ottomans were reeling from a series of defeats in Hungary and Dalmatia: following the disastrous Battle of Mohács, in November 1687, a mutiny broke out that resulted in the dismissal and execution of the Grand Vizier Sarı Süleyman Pasha and even the deposition of Sultan Mehmed IV (r. 1648–1687), who was replaced by his brother Suleiman II (r. 1687–1691). Several of Morosini's councillors suggested the moment opportune to attempt a reconquest of Crete, but the new Doge refused, and insisted on a campaign against Negroponte.

On 11 July, the first Venetian troops began disembarking at Negroponte, and laid siege to it two days later. The Venetians had assembled a substantial force, 13,000 troops and further 10,000 men in the fleet, against the Ottoman garrison of 6,000 men, which offered determined resistance. The Venetian fleet was unable to fully blockade the city, which allowed Ismail Pasha's forces, across the Euripus Strait, to ferry supplies to the besieged castle. The Venetians and their allies suffered great losses, especially from another outbreak of the plague, including General Königsmarck, who succumbed to the plague on 15 September, while the Knights of Malta and of St. Stephen departed the siege in early autumn. After a last assault on 12 October proved a costly failure, Morosini had to accept defeat. On 22 October, the Venetian army, having lost in total c. 9,000 men, left Negroponte and headed for Argos. with them went the warlord Nikolaos Karystinos, who had launched an uprising in southern Euboea and had tried, without success, to capture the castle of Karystos.

Depleted by the siege and by illness, the remnants of the Hannoverian and Hessian mercenaries departed Greece on 5 November. Morosini attempted an unsuccessful attack on Monemvasia in late 1689, but his failing health forced him to return to Venice soon after. He was replaced as commander-in-chief by Girolamo Cornaro. This marked the end of Venetian ascendancy, and the beginning of a number of successful, although in the end not decisive, Ottoman counteroffensives.

=== Battles in Dalmatia ===
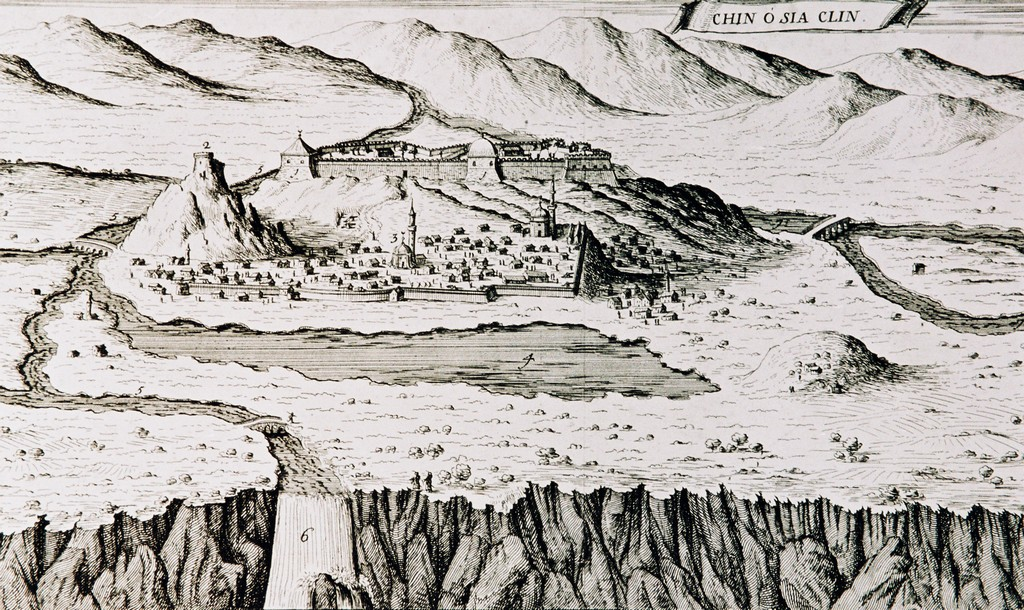
Knin during the Venetian siege of 1687

In the Morean War, the Republic of Venice besieged Sinj in October 1684 and then again March and April 1685, but both times without success. In the 1685 attempt, the Venetian armies were aided by the local militia of the Republic of Poljica, who thereby rebelled against their nominal Ottoman suzerainty that had existed since 1513. In an effort to retaliate to Poljica, in June 1685, the Ottomans attacked Zadvarje, and in July 1686 Dolac and Srijane, but were pushed back, and suffered major casualties. With the help of the local population of Poljica as well as the Morlachs, the fortress of Sinj finally fell to the Venetian army on 30 September 1686. On 1 September 1687 the siege of Castelnuovo started, and ended with a Venetian victory on 30 September. Knin was taken after a twelve-day siege on 11 September 1688. The capture of Knin marked the end of the successful Venetian campaign to expand their territory in inland Dalmatia, and it also determined much of the final border between Dalmatia and Bosnia and Herzegovina that stands today. The Ottomans would besiege Sinj again in the Second Morean War, but would be repelled.

On 26 November 1690, Venice took Vrgorac, which opened the route towards Imotski and Mostar. In 1694 they managed to take areas north of the Republic of Ragusa, namely Čitluk, Gabela, Zažablje, Trebinje, Popovo, Klobuk and Metković. In the final peace treaty, Venice did relinquish the areas of Popovo polje as well as Klek and Sutorina, to maintain the pre-existing demarcation near Ragusa.

== Ottoman resurgence ==
The new Ottoman sultan initially desired a peace settlement, but the outbreak of the Nine Years' War in 1688, and the subsequent diversion of Austrian resources towards fighting France, encouraged the Ottoman leadership to continue the war. Under the capable leadership of the new Grand Vizier, Köprülü Fazıl Mustafa Pasha, the Ottomans went over to the counteroffensive. As the main effort was directed against Austria, the Ottomans were never able to spare enough men to reverse the Venetian gains completely.

=== The rise and fall of Limberakis Gerakaris ===
In late 1688, the Turks turned for help to the Maniot buccaneer Limberakis Gerakaris, who had helped them during their invasion of Mani in the Cretan War, but had since been imprisoned at Constantinople for acts of piracy. He was released, invested as "Bey of Mani", allowed to recruit a force of a few hundreds, and joined the Ottoman army at Thebes. Despite the fact that he never commanded any major army, Gerakaris was to play a major role in the latter stages of the war, since his daring and destructive raids destabilized Venetian control and proved a continuous drain on the Republic's resources. In spring 1689, Gerakaris conducted his first raid against the Venetian positions in western Central Greece, with a mixed force of 2,000 Turks, Albanians, Slavs and Maniots. Gerakaris seized and torched Missolonghi, plundered the regions of Valtos and Xiromero, and launched attacks on the Venetian strongholds in Aitoliko and Vonitsa.

To counter this new threat, the Venetians renewed their attempts to win over local leaders and recruit local and refugee Greeks into militias. In this way, the Republic formed two warbands, one at Karpenisi under the Greek armatoloi captains and Dalmatian officers Spanos, Chormopoulos, Bossinas, Vitos, and Lubozovich, and another at Loidoriki under the captains Kourmas, Meïdanis, and Elias Damianovich. At the same time, the large swathe of no man's land between the Ottoman strongholds in the east and the Venetian-held territories in the west was increasingly a haven for independent warbands, both Christian and Muslim, who were augmented by Albanian and Dalmatian deserters from the Venetian army. The local population was thus at the mercy of the Venetians and their Greek and Dalmatian auxiliaries on the one hand, who extracted protection money, the depredations of marauding warbands, and the Ottomans, who still demanded the payment of regular taxes. The complexity of the conflict is illustrated by the fact that Gerakaris was repulsed in June 1689 in an attack on Salona (Amfissa) by the local inhabitants under Dimitrios Charopolitis and Elias Damianovich, but at about the same time, Gerakaris defended the villages of Agrafa and Karpenisi from marauding Christian warbands. Gerakaris attempted to persuade many of the independent warbands to enter Ottoman service, but without much success. He was more successful in persuading many of the Athenians who had fled the city in 1688 to return to their homes, after the Ottoman serasker guaranteed that there would be no reprisals against them.

In 1690, the reinforced Ottoman forces swept through Central Greece, and although they were repulsed in an attack on Lepanto, they re-established control over the hinterland east of Lepanto. The Venetians too scored a success: Monemvasia fell on 12 August 1690, thus removing the last Ottoman bastion in the Morea.

In 1692, Gerakaris spearheaded an Ottoman invasion of the Peloponnese. He took Corinth, and unsuccessfully besieged the Acrocorinth and Argos, before being forced to withdraw by the arrival of Venetian reinforcements. After renewed invasions into the Peloponnese in 1694 and 1695, Gerakaris went over to the Venetian camp. In 1696, after negotiations and the mediation of Panagiotis Doxaras, Gerakaris officially joined the Venetians with several terms and conditions; for example, he was awarded with the Order of Saint Mark. Gerakaris's defection to the Venetians was a plight to the Ottoman war effort causing them to go on the defensive, in order to prevent Greek lands from being captured. However, his brutal and savage treatment of the civilian population and his intriguing for the position of Bey of Mani could not be tolerated for long by Venice, and after the brutal sack of Arta in 27 August 1696, Gerakaris was arrested and imprisoned at Brescia.

=== Operations in Montenegro ===
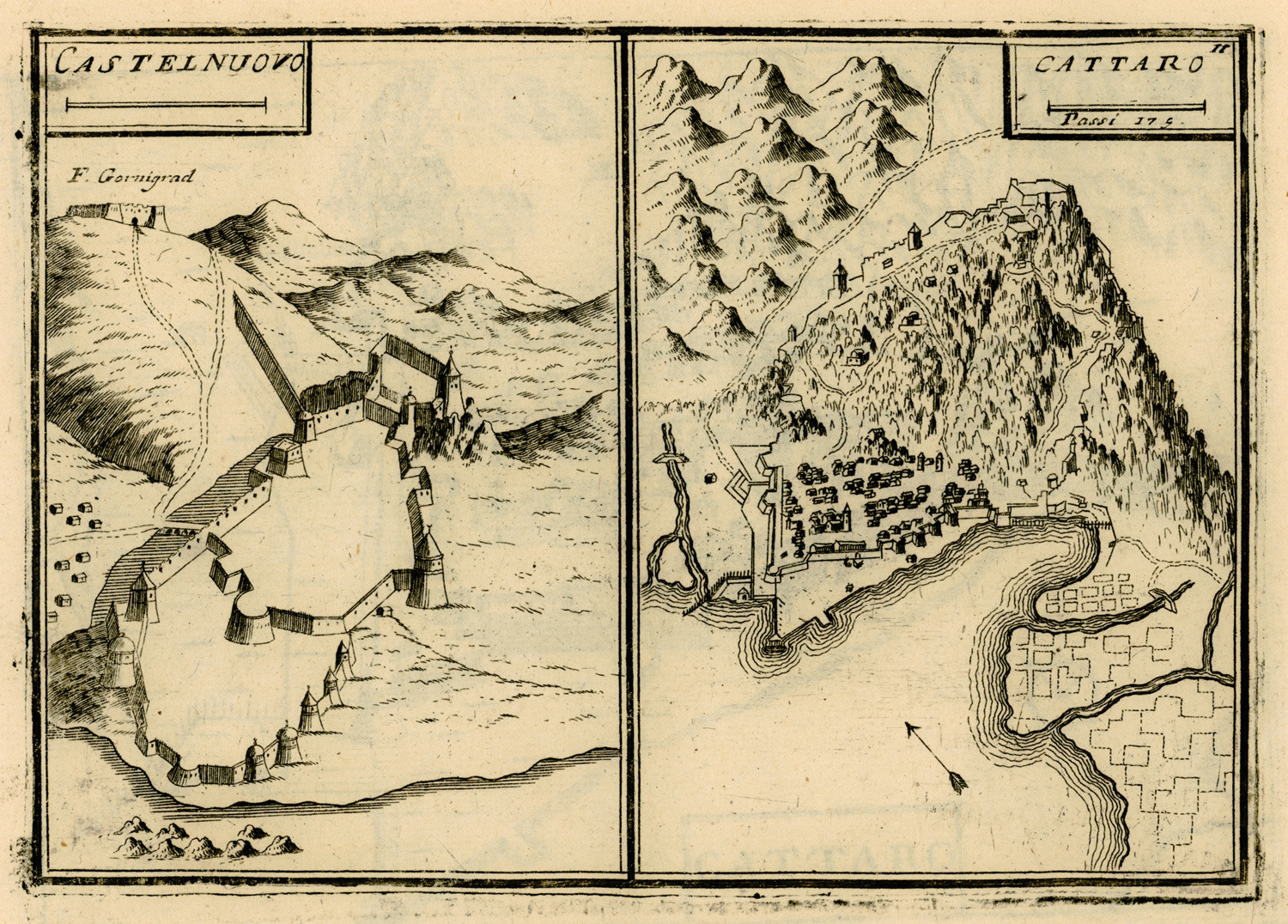
The fortresses of Castelnuovo (Herceg Novi) and Cattaro (Kotor), by Vincenzo Coronelli

Venetians had important ties and considerable support among the Montenegrins, with solid ground established previously during the Cretan war. Venice strongly considered placing Montenegro under its own protection. In 1685, Montenegrin Metropolitan Rufim Boljević had died."The most loyal friend of Venice" at the time, as said by the Venetians themselves, after a brief tenure of Vasilije Veljekrajski was replaced by Visarion Borilović Bajica. Borilović ascended to the throne as a protege of his relative Patriarch of Peć Arsenije III Čarnojević. Previously a great supporter of Venice, after establishment of contact with Emperor's representatives in 1688, Arsenije became an important ally of the Habsburgs in the Balkans. Venetians were worried that under Arsenije's influence, who himself was of Montenegrin origin, the Montenegrins would lean more towards the Austrians, and thus kept at distance Visarion as well. The course of the Great Turkish War did not always coincide with Venetian interests, and thus this two-sided politics resulted in indecisive and irregular shape of the war in Montenegro. In their effort to win over Montenegrins at their side, Venice sent a detachment of Hajduks, led by their compatriot Bajo Pivljanin to Cetinje to raise the population against the Ottomans in 1685. The detachment was composed mainly of Montenegrins from Grbalj and Boka Kotorska. Previously, they demonstrated their intents during a short night attack on Herceg Novi on 22 August 1684. The Vizier of Skhoder, Suleyman Bushati, after threatening and pacifying the tribes of Kuči and Kelmendi, gathered an army and marched towards Cetinje, when Pivljanin and his hajduks, accompanied by Venetian detachment and joined by some Montenegrins decided to make a last stand. The confrontation resulted in Battle of Vrtijeljka, where the Ottoman forces annihilated the hajduks and penetrated to Cetinje. After plundering Cetinje, Bushati retreated. Undetermined, with result in low rate of mobilisation, Montenegrin attitude towards the war quickly changed, and despite the fact that handful of them were forcibly mobilised during Bushati's attack on Budva in 1686 they were now in favor of Venice.

Visarion Borilović, who was elected in the meantime, devised a closer war plan with the Venetians, and sent 1500 Montenegrins under Duke Vučeta Bogdanović from Njeguši in the aid of Girolamo Cornaro during his attack on Herceg Novi. Venetian fleet set sails from Hvar and in a couple of days reached Castelnuovo on 2 September. Venetians commenced a siege, followed by heavy bombardment on a daily basis. Ottomans tried to break the blockade by sending reinforcements commanded by Topal Hussein Pasha of Bosnia on 15 September. They were ultimately defeated by Montenegrins on Kameno. Herceg Novi surrendered to the Venetians on 31 September ending almost a century and a half rule of the Ottomans established in 1540. The Ottomans tried to retaliate in March and May 1688. Suleyman Pasha Bushati attacked Montenegrin Highland tribe Kuči, only to suffer a devastating defeat twice, with 1500 casualties and lost Medun to them. In the summer of the same year, at the tribal assembly in Gradac in Lješanska nahija, Montenegro officially recognised Venetian suzerainty.

Metropolitan Visarion thus invited nobleman from Kotor Ivan "Zane" Grbičić to Cetinje the following year, who was then elected the first Montenegrin Guvernadur. Venetians established a garrison in Cetinje, and fortified themselves in Cetinje Monastery. In July 1691 Suleyman was defeated yet again during his expeditions of punishment by Piperi and Bjelopavlići. In 1692 Visarion Borilović Bajica died under mysterious circumstances. The popular conspiracy theory has it that he was poisoned by the Venetians. In September of the same year, Suleyman launched another large campaign against Montenegro. The Venetian forces had no intent of facing him like the hajduks did seven years earlier and in turn retreated to the sanctuary of Cetinje monastery. Ottoman army reached Cetinje almost without a fight, with handful of Montenegrins giving only resistance. After negotiations, Venetian army was allowed to retreat from Cetinje. Before their departure, they time-mined the monastery, destroying it permanently. This move was quite unpopular among the local population and resulted in Montenegro turning its back on Venice. The strong ties remained, with guvernadur title being passed to the House of Vukotić, and then after, to the House of Radonjić. Ottoman army retreated from Cetinje shortly after.

=== Capture of Kanina and Valona (1690) ===
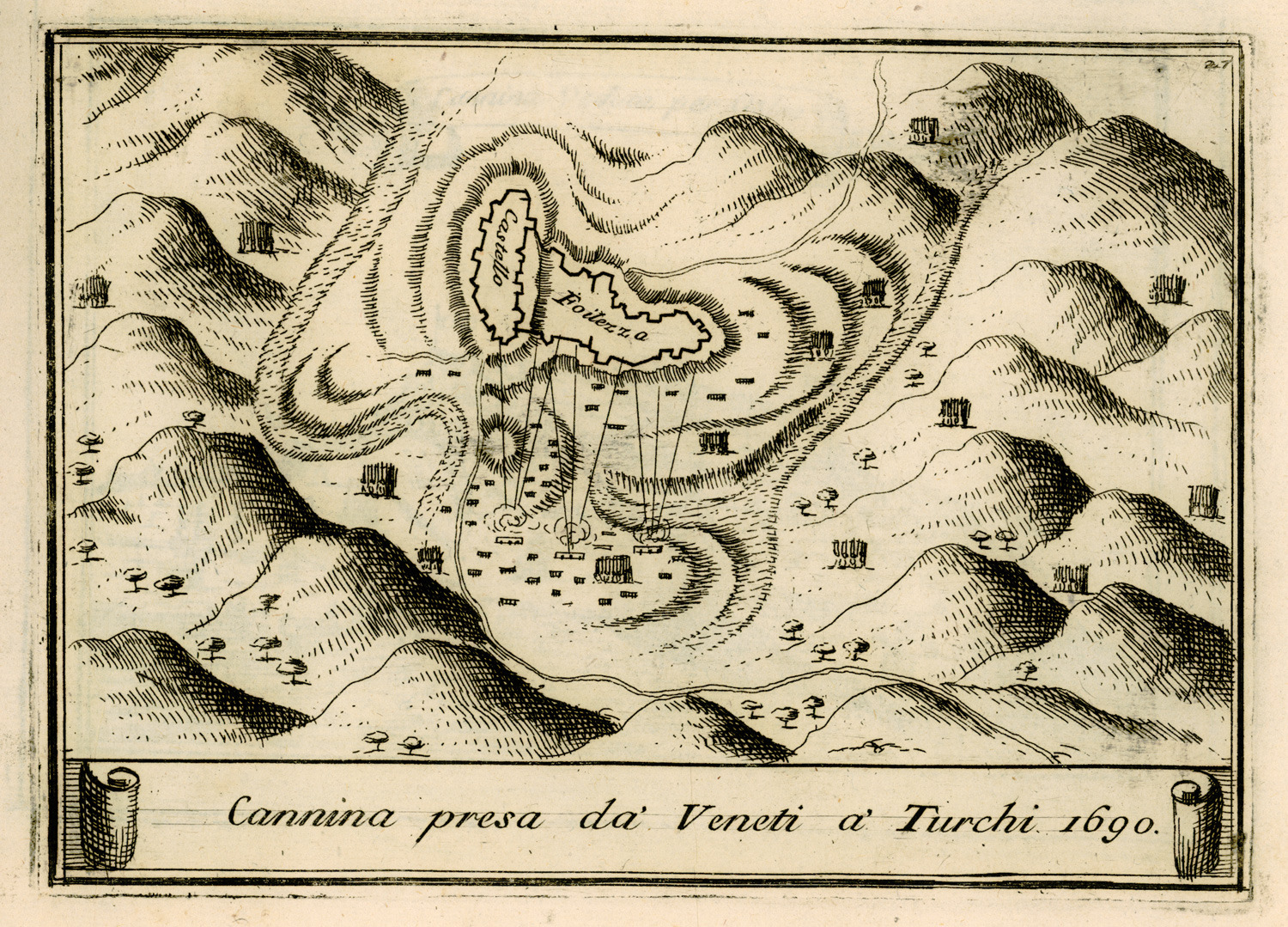
The Siege of Kanina, by Vincenzo Coronelli

In an effort to aid the Greeks of Himara, who had rebelled against the Turks, and after some successes in northern Albania and Montenegro, the Venetian fleet launched an attack against the Ottoman port and fortress of Valona. The Venetians landed troops on 11 September 1690, but instead of confronting them, the Ottomans withdrew and divided their 7,000 troops in the area between the Valona and the inland fortress of Kanina. The Venetians forced Kanina to surrender on 17 September, and Valona was captured on the next day, after its garrison evacuated it. This success allowed the Venetians to expand the area under their control along the coasts and interior of Epirus to Argyrokastron, Himara, Souli, and even the vicinity of Arta.

The Ottoman reaction was not long delayed: in early 1691, Grand Vizier Fazıl Mustafa Pasha sent reinforcements under Kaplan Pasha and Djafer Pasha, the new serasker of the Morea, Hoca Halil Pasha, and Suleiman Pasha of Shkoder, to regain the lost territories in the western Balkans. By 14 March, the Ottomans had recovered Valona and regained control of northern Epirus. For the next two years, the local inhabitants, particularly in Himara, were subject to brutal reprisals, which led many to flee to Corfu, and others to convert to Islam to save themselves.

=== Attack on Crete (1692) ===
After ensuring the defense of the Isthmus of Corinth, with 2,000 foot soldiers, 4,000 cavalry and 250 Greeks, the Venetians turned their attention to Crete. In 1692, a Venetian fleet comprising 34 galleons and 27 other vessels under Domenico Mocenigo attacked Crete and laid siege to its capital Candia, while at the same time the Greeks of the island rose up against the Ottomans. Despite this, the attempt to retake Crete failed due to several factors, such as Mocenigo's reluctance and Christian desertions, among others. Mocenigo ended the siege, took with him 2,000 Cretans who worked with him against the Ottomans, and left to the Peloponnese.

=== Final years of the war ===
Hoping to reinvigorate the Venetian cause, Morosini himself returned to the Morea in 1693. His advanced age denied him the chance to prove his abilities again, and on 16 January 1694, he died at Nauplia. His successor, Antonio Zeno, against the advice of his officers, led an expedition against the rich island of Chios, off the coast of Asia Minor. The island was taken easily, but the Turkish response was swift and massive. A double naval battle near the Oinousses Islands in February 1695 resulted in a Venetian defeat, and forced a humiliating Venetian withdrawal from Chios.

The Ottomans were encouraged to invade the Morea again, but were defeated by General Steinau and driven back to their base at Thebes. At the same time, Steinau succeeded in bringing Gerakaris to come over to the Venetian side (see above).

=== Naval operations in the Aegean ===
There were several naval clashes between the opposing fleets, such as at Lesbos in 1690, at Andros in 1696 and also in September 1697, at Lemnos in July 1697, and at Samothrace in 1698, but they were generally indecisive and failed to shift the balance of forces.

== Aftermath ==
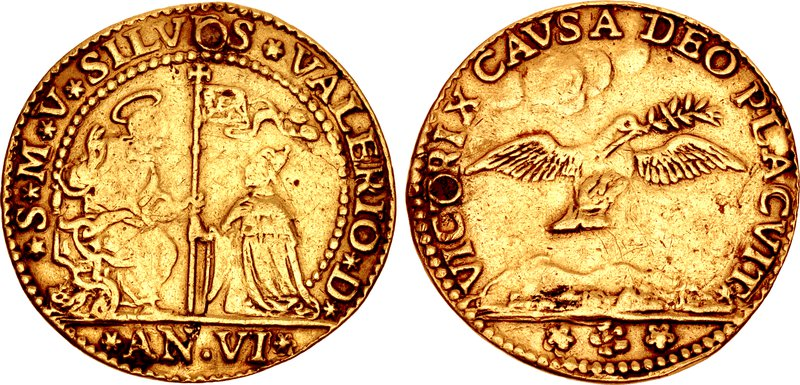
Venetian four-zecchino coin celebrating the Treaty of Karlowitz

The Treaty of Karlowitz, signed in January 1699, confirmed the Venetian possession of Kephalonia, and the Morea with the island of Aigina, which became organized as the "Kingdom of the Morea" (Italian: Regno di Morea), divided into four provinces: Romania, with seat at Nafplion (Napoli di Romania), Laconia, with seat at Monemvasia (Malvasia), Messenia, with seat at Navarino, and Achaea, with seat at Patras (Patrasso). The war had created a demographic and economic crisis in the Peloponnese. According to the first census conducted by the Venetians, there were 86,468 people in the peninsula compared to a pre-war population of around 200,000. Although the Venetians managed to restore some prosperity – the population allegedly rose to some 250,000 by 1708, probably driven by immigration – they failed to win the trust of their Greek Orthodox subjects, who were used to a relative autonomy under the Turks and resented the Venetian bureaucracy. The Venetians also launched a great fortification project throughout the Morea, whose results can still be seen today. Nevertheless, Venice itself was too weakened to effectively assert its authority, and in 1715 a swift Ottoman campaign (in what was often termed the Second Morean War) reclaimed the Morea.

== General references ==
- Anderson, R. C. (1952). Naval Wars in the Levant 1559–1853. Princeton: Princeton University Press.
- Candiani, Guido (2001). "L'evoluzione della flotta veneziana durante la prima guerra di Morea" (PDF) (Paper presented at Venezia e il Mediterraneo. La guerra di Morea seminar, held by the Fondazione Querini Stampalia – Dipartimento di Studi Storici, Venice, 25 May 2001) (in Italian).
- Candiani, Guido (2003). "Lo sviluppo dell'Armata grossa nell'emergenza della guerra marittima" (PDF). Storia di Venezia – Rivista (in Italian). I. ISSN 1724-7446.
- Chatziaslani, Kornilia. "Morosini in Athens". Archaeology of the city of Athens.
- Dokos, Konstantinos (1975). Ἡ Στερεά Ἐλλάς κατά τον ἐνετοτουρκικόν πόλεμον (1684–1699) και ὁ Σαλώνων Φιλόθεος [Continental Greece during the Venetian–Turkish War (1684–1699) and Philotheos of Salona] (in Greek). Athens.
- Mayhew, Tea (2008). Dalmatia Between Ottoman and Venetian Rule: Contado di Zara 1645–1718. Viella. ISBN 9788883343346.
- Locatelli, Alessandro (1691). Racconto Historico Della Guerra in Levante. Venice: Girolamo Albrizi.
- Vakalopoulos, Apostolos E. (1973). Ιστορία του νέου ελληνισμού, Τόμος Δ′: Τουρκοκρατία 1669–1812 – Η οικονομική άνοδος και ο φωτισμός του γένους (Έκδοση Β′) [History of modern Hellenism, Volume IV: Turkish rule 1669–1812 – Economic upturn and enlightenment of the nation] (in Greek) (2nd ed.). Thessaloniki: Emm. Sfakianakis & Sons.
