= Borak =

Borak may refer to:

- Borak, Bosnia and Herzegovina, a village near Kneževo
- Borak necropolis, a medieval graveyard near Rogatica, Bosnia and Herzegovina
- Borak, Croatia, a village near Omiš
- Borak, Iran (disambiguation)
- Laraki Borak, a Moroccan sportscar made by Laraki
- Borak rocket, an Iraqi 122mm nerve agent rocket
- Borak (cosmetic), a facial cosmetic paste used by the Sama-Bajau people of Southeast Asia

== See also ==
- El Borak, a fictional character created by Robert E. Howard
- Buraq, a creature in Islamic tradition
- Burak (name), a Turkish given name
