= Podašpilje =

Settlement in Split-Dalmatia County, Croatia

- Settlement
- Interactive map of Podašpilje
- Location of Podašpilje in Croatia
- Coordinates: 43°25′57″N 16°45′18″E
- Country: Croatia
- County: Split-Dalmatia
- City: Omiš

Area
  - Total: 5.2 km^{2} (2.0 sq mi)

Population (2021)
  - Total: 20
  - Density: 3.8/km^{2} (10/sq mi)
- Time zone: UTC+1 (CET)
  - Summer (DST): UTC+2 (CEST)
- Postal code: 21310 Omiš
- Area code: +385 (0)21

Podašpilje is a settlement in the City of Omiš in Croatia. In 2021, its population was 20.

== Demographics ==
Podašpilje: Population trends 1857–2021
v

population	79		111	163	221	214			220	225	219	85	25	13	6	20	20
	1857	1869	1880	1890	1900	1910	1921	1931	1948	1953	1961	1971	1981	1991	2001	2011	2021

Sources: Croatian Bureau of Statistics publications
