= Naklice =

Settlement in Split-Dalmatia County, Croatia

- Settlement
- Interactive map of Naklice
- Location of Naklice in Croatia
- Coordinates: 43°27′18″N 16°40′37″E
- Country: Croatia
- County: Split-Dalmatia
- City: Omiš

Area
  - Total: 2.4 km^{2} (0.93 sq mi)

Population (2021)
  - Total: 237
  - Density: 99/km^{2} (260/sq mi)
- Time zone: UTC+1 (CET)
  - Summer (DST): UTC+2 (CEST)
- Postal code: 21310 Omiš
- Area code: +385 (0)21

Naklice is a settlement in the City of Omiš in Croatia. In 2021, its population was 237.

== Demographics ==
Naklice: Population trends 1857–2021
v

population	65		128	142	163	178			202	214	247	210	189	187	224	236	237
	1857	1869	1880	1890	1900	1910	1921	1931	1948	1953	1961	1971	1981	1991	2001	2011	2021

Sources: Croatian Bureau of Statistics publications
