= Marušići =

- Village
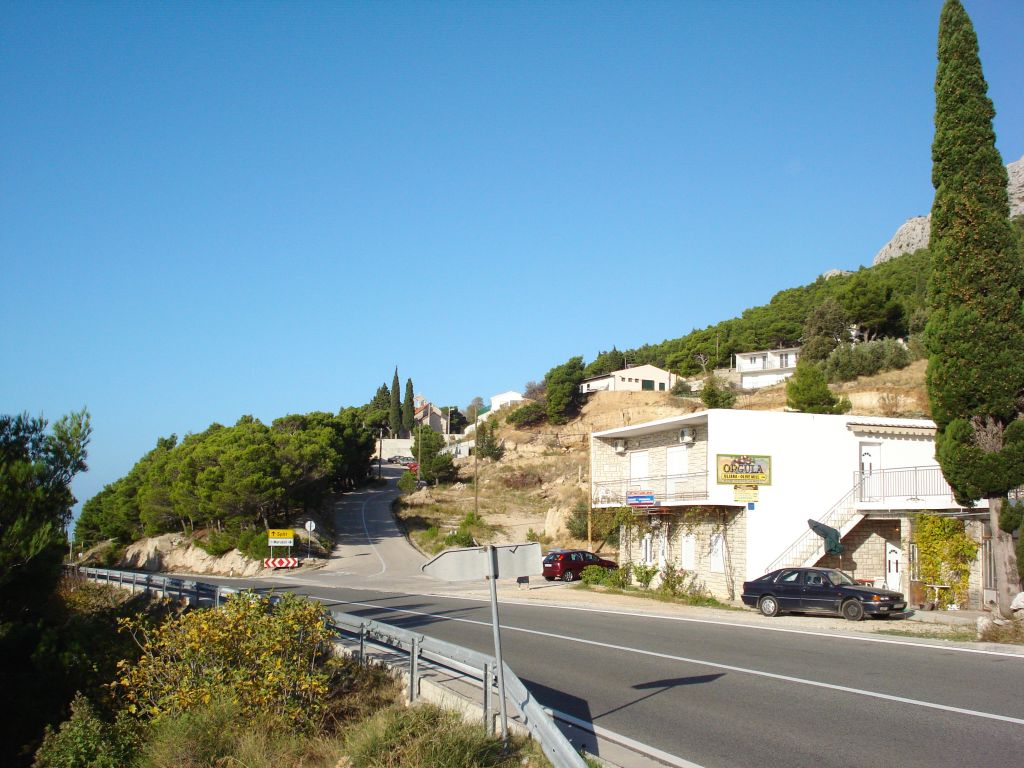
- Marušići

- Location of Marušići within Croatia
- Coordinates: 43°24′09″N 16°49′24″E
- Country: Croatia
- County: Split-Dalmatia
- Municipality: Omiš

Area
  - Total: 2.5 km^{2} (0.97 sq mi)

Population (2021)
  - Total: 141
  - Density: 56/km^{2} (150/sq mi)
- Time zone: UTC+1 (CET)
  - Summer (DST): UTC+2 (CEST)
- Postal code: 21318
- Area code: 021

Marušići is a small Croatian village located on the slopes of Dinara mountain, in the east part of the Omiš Riviera of the Adriatic Sea, as well as the village of Šestanovac north of Omiš, 36 kilometres (22 mi) from Split, and 18 kilometres (11 mi) from Makarska.

According to the 2001 census, Marušići had 203 residents. The main economic activities of the village are tourism, wine, olive and fruit. The village has a church, an olive mill, a store, and several restaurants.

Marusic is a known royal family dating back to the 13th century. Which the settlement is named after.

== Bibliography ==
=== Biology ===
- Šašić, Martina; Nahirnić, Ana; Tarmann, Gerhard M. (2016-12-31). "Zygaenidae (Lepidoptera) in the Lepidoptera collections of the Croatian Natural History Museum". Natura Croatica: Periodicum Musei Historiae Naturalis Croatici. 25 (2): 233–248. doi:10.20302/NC.2016.25.19. eISSN 1848-7386.
