= Kučiće =

Settlement in Split-Dalmatia County, Croatia

- Settlement
- Interactive map of Kučiće
- Location of Kučiće in Croatia
- Coordinates: 43°30′N 16°36′E
- Country: Croatia
- County: Split-Dalmatia
- City: Omiš

Area
  - Total: 8.6 km^{2} (3.3 sq mi)

Population (2021)
  - Total: 634
  - Density: 74/km^{2} (190/sq mi)
- Time zone: UTC+1 (CET)
  - Summer (DST): UTC+2 (CEST)
- Postal code: 21310 Omiš
- Area code: +385 (0)21

Kučiće is a settlement in the City of Omiš in Croatia. In 2021, its population was 634.

== Demographics ==
Kučiće: Population trends 1857–2021
v

population	443	509	557	684	830	903	905	1017	982	957	928	884	878	944	697	607	634
	1857	1869	1880	1890	1900	1910	1921	1931	1948	1953	1961	1971	1981	1991	2001	2011	2021

Sources: Croatian Bureau of Statistics publications
