= Čelina, Croatia =

Settlement in Split-Dalmatia County, Croatia

Čelina
- Settlement
- Interactive map of Čelina
- Location of Čelina in Croatia
- Coordinates: 43°24′43″N 16°44′23″E
- Country: Croatia
- County: Split-Dalmatia
- City: Omiš

Area
  - Total: 1.3 km^{2} (0.50 sq mi)

Population (2021)
  - Total: 206
  - Density: 160/km^{2} (410/sq mi)
- Time zone: UTC+1 (CET)
  - Summer (DST): UTC+2 (CEST)
- Postal code: 21310 Omiš
- Area code: +385 (0)21

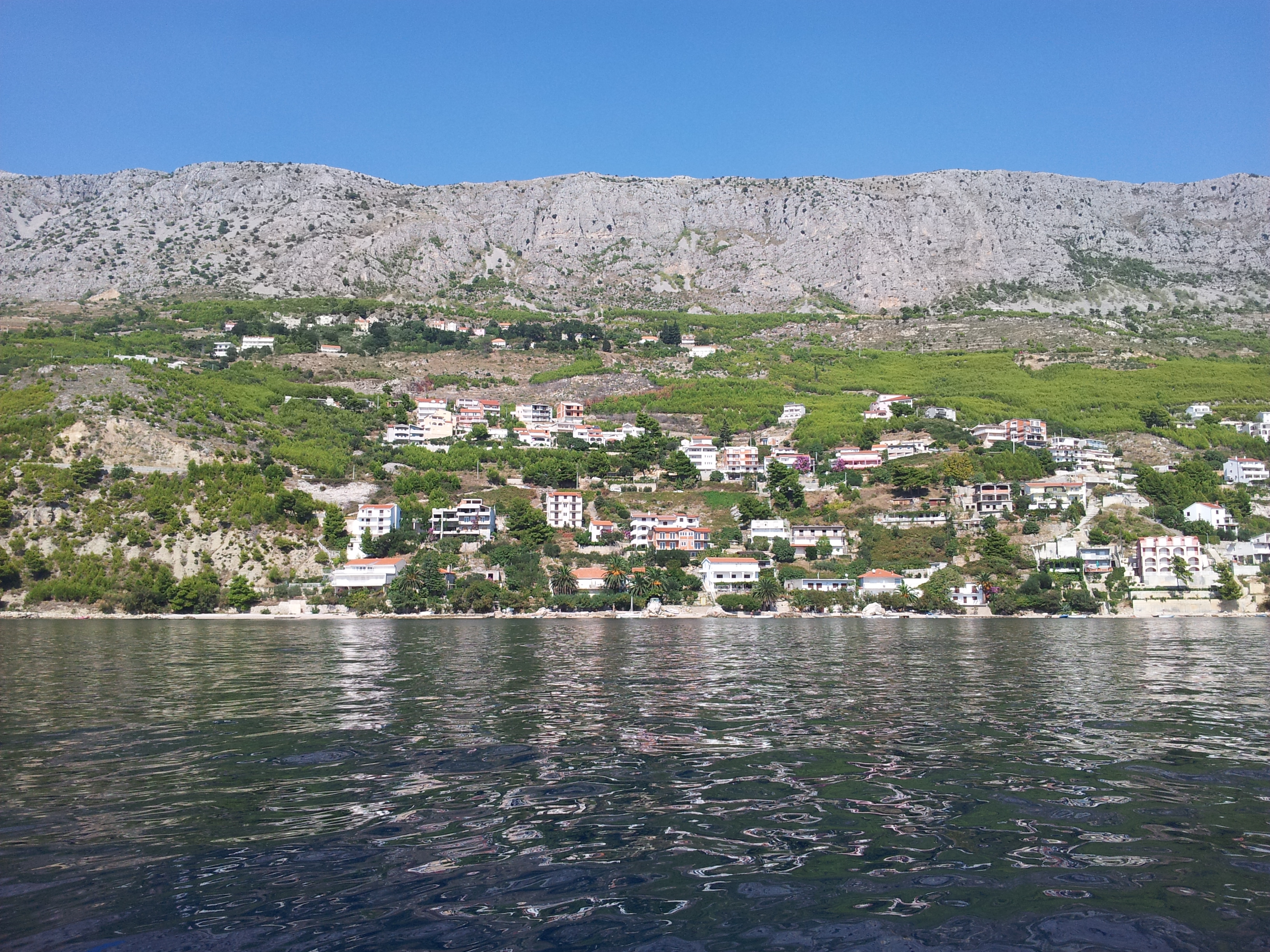
Čelina, Zavode

Čelina is a settlement in the City of Omiš in Croatia. In 2021, its population was 206.

== Demographics ==
Čelina: Population trends 1857–2021
v

population	50		75	106	124	138			145	160	159	109	96	116	182	222	206
	1857	1869	1880	1890	1900	1910	1921	1931	1948	1953	1961	1971	1981	1991	2001	2011	2021

Sources: Croatian Bureau of Statistics publications
