= Dubrava, Split-Dalmatia County =

Village in Croatia

Dubrava
- settlement
- Interactive map of Dubrava
- Location within Croatia
- Coordinates: 43°29′52″N 16°38′59″E
- Country: Croatia
- County: Split-Dalmatia
- City: Omiš

Area
  - Total: 16.7 km^{2} (6.4 sq mi)

Population (2021)
  - Total: 305
  - Density: 18.3/km^{2} (47.3/sq mi)
- Time zone: UTC+1 (CET)
  - Summer (DST): UTC+2 (CEST)
- Postal code: 21310 Omiš
- Area code: 021

Dubrava is a settlement in the Town of Omiš in Croatia. In 2021, its population was 305.

== Demographics ==
Village Dubrava: Population trends 1857–2021
v

population	272	280	304	343	354	393	400	446	425	405	421	383	322	317	301	300	305
	1857	1869	1880	1890	1900	1910	1921	1931	1948	1953	1961	1971	1981	1991	2001	2011	2021

Sources: Croatian Bureau of Statistics publications
