= Omiš =

Town in Split-Dalmatia, Croatia

- Town
- Grad Omiš; Town of Omiš
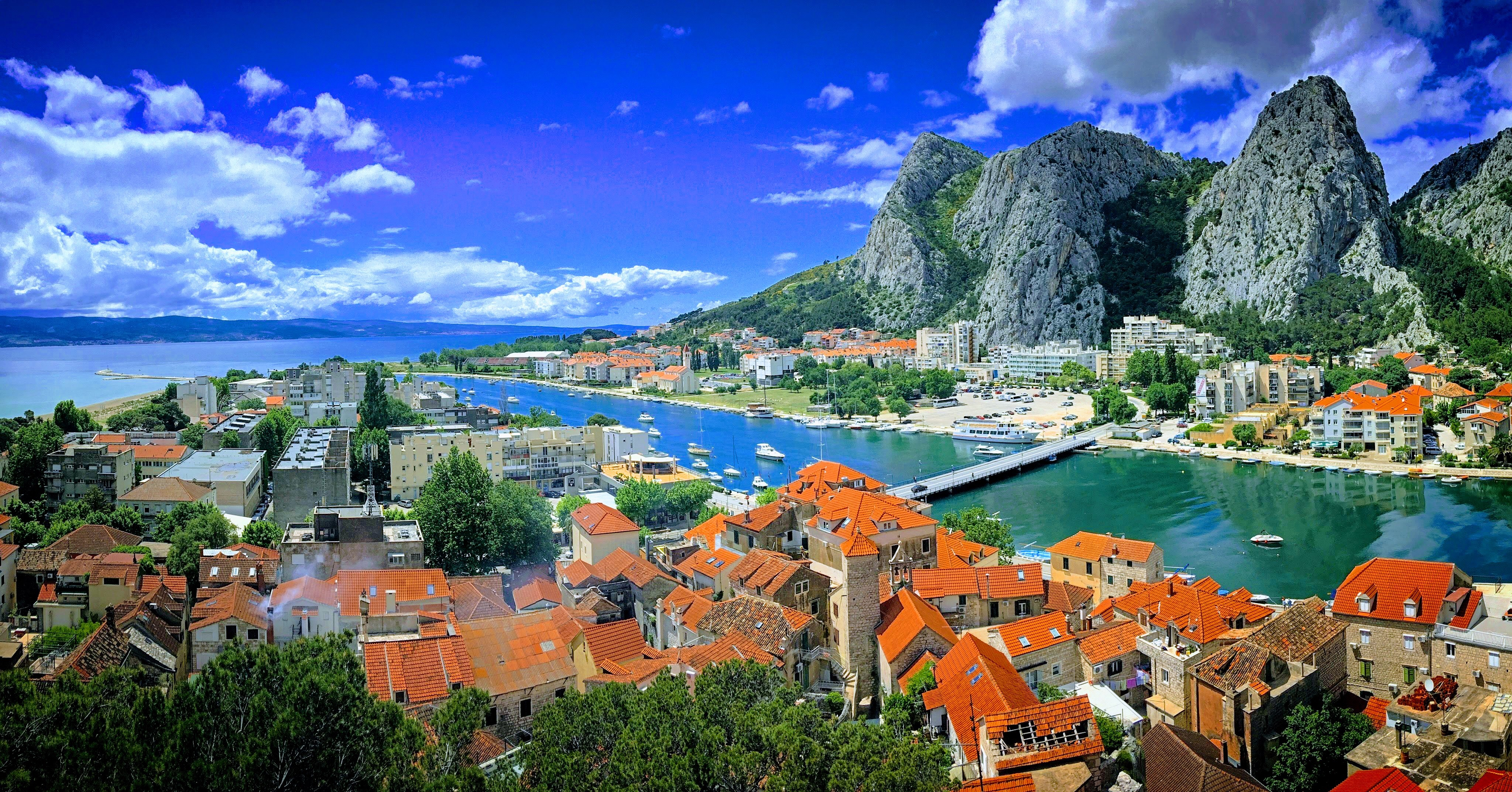
- View of Omiš
- Interactive map of Omiš
- Location within Croatia
- Coordinates: 43°26′N 16°41′E
- Country: Croatia
- Region: Dalmatia
- County: Split-Dalmatia County

Government
  - Type: Mayor-Council
  - Mayor: Zvonko Močić

Area
  - Town: 266.2 km^{2} (102.8 sq mi)
  - Urban: 3.4 km^{2} (1.3 sq mi)

Population (2021)
  - Town: 14,139
  - Density: 53.11/km^{2} (137.6/sq mi)
  - Urban: 5,985
  - Urban density: 1,800/km^{2} (4,600/sq mi)
- Time zone: UTC+1 (CET)
  - Summer (DST): UTC+2 (CEST)
- Website: omis.hr

Mountains above Omiš, east of Cetina river

Fortica mountain above Omiš town

Omiš (pronounced [ɔ̌miːʃ]) is a town and port in the Dalmatia region of Croatia, and a municipality in the Split-Dalmatia County. The town is approximately 25 kilometres (16 miles) south-east of Croatia's second largest city, Split, where the Cetina River meets the Adriatic Sea. In 2021, the municipality had a population of 14,139.

== Name ==
It is supposed that the name of this city, Omiš, developed from the Slavic Holm, Hum as a translation from the Illyrian - Greek word Onaion, Oneon, meaning "hill" or "place on the hill", or from Greek onos (όνος) meaning donkey, perhaps from the shape of the rocky promontory by the city (naming a city after a natural form was common practice then, as it is now); there is also the possibility that the name of the settlement Onaeum was derived from the name of the river which was called Nestos by the Greek colonists in its lower flow, during Antiquity. According to Petar Šimunović, Omiš is derived from Proto-Indo-European *almissa ("rock", "cliff").

Latin names during Ancient Rome were Onaeum, Oeneum, Alminium, and Almissum. During medieval times the name was recorded as Olmissium, Almiyssium and from the end of the 15th century, when the city fell to the authority of Venetian Republic, its name was the Italian Almissa.

== History ==
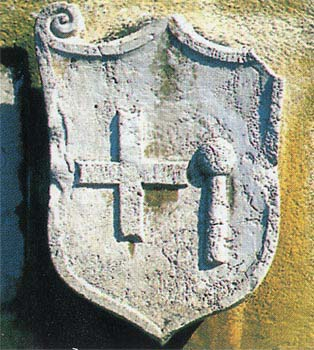
Omiš Historical Coat of Arms from year 1541.

Omiš was well known in the past by the Corsairs of Almissa (Omiški gusari) whose Sagittas (ships) (Genitive case: Sagittae, translated as The Arrow), brought fame to them because they were built for attack and fast retrieval into the mouth of the Cetina River, protecting the town from foreign invaders. At a very early date, neighbours of the Corsairs of Almissa, the highlanders of the Poljica Principality (Poljička Republika), became their friends and allies. This allowed them to harass the seaborne trade, without fear of a sudden attack from inland.

- Historical monuments:
  - Church of St Euphemia by the coast on Brzet, from the early 6th century
  - Mirabella Fortress (Peovica) from the 13th century
  - Starigrad Fortress (Fortica) from the 15th century
  - Renaissance church of the Holy Spirit from the 15th century
  - Old cemetery, the 16th century or 17th century
  - Parochial church from the 17th century
  - Franciscan Monastery on Skalice from the 18th century

In the Priko neighborhood, on the right bank of the Cetina River, stands the site with the most historic significance: the pre-Romanesque Church of St. Peter (Crkva Sv. Petra) from the tenth century A.D. This single-naved edifice, with a cupola and apse, was used in the 18th century as a Glagolithic seminary for novice priests.

== Economy ==
Today, Omiš's economy is based on farming, fishing, textile and food-processing industries and tourism.

== Settlements ==
In 2021, the town had 14139 residents in the following 31 settlements:

- Blato na Cetini, population 462
- Borak, population 199
- Čelina, population 206
- Čisla, population 310
- Donji Dolac, population 284
- Dubrava, population 305
- Gata, population 599
- Gornji Dolac, population 107
- Kostanje, population 572
- Kučiće, population 634
- Lokva Rogoznica, population 334
- Marušići, population 141
- Mimice, population 241
- Naklice, population 237
- Nova Sela, population 152
- Omiš, population 5,985
- Ostrvica, population 191
- Pisak, population 150
- Podašpilje, population 20
- Podgrađe, population 289
- Putišići, population 37
- Seoca, population 132
- Slime, population 271
- Smolonje, population 75
- Srijane, population 223
- Stanići, population 482
- Svinišće, population 87
- Trnbusi, population 176
- Tugare, population 875
- Zakučac, population 156
- Zvečanje, population 207
Town of Omiš: Population trends 1857–2021
v

population	8153	9255	10038	11212	12788	13791	14283	15344	15122	15094	17637	15880	15056	15630	15472	14936	14139
	1857	1869	1880	1890	1900	1910	1921	1931	1948	1953	1961	1971	1981	1991	2001	2011	2021

Sources: Croatian Bureau of Statistics publications

== Culture ==
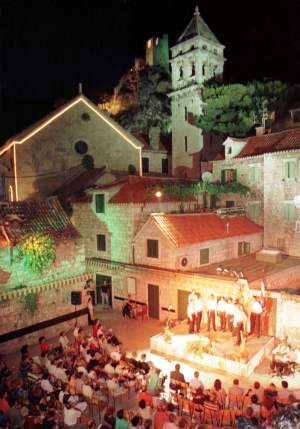
Klapa festival in Omiš

Omiš is best known for the traditional festival of the Dalmatian a cappella singing groups. This festival is the highlight of Omiš's summer, the expression of the town's beauty. Omiš's Summer Festival - during which various concerts and recitals are performed - takes place at the plazas and in churches.

- Omiš as a town has eight churches:
  - church of Saint Michael
  - church of Holy Ghost
  - church of Saint Rock
  - church of Saint Peter
  - church of Saint Luca
  - church of Saint Mary
  - Franciscan Monastery with church of Our Lady of Carmel
  - church of Saint Stephan and
  - remains of church of Saint John in Borak.

== Sports ==
The local chapter of the HPS is HPD "Dinara". Membership was at 54 in 1936 under the Slavko Recelj presidency, and the chapter had to be liquidated on 20 April 1938.

== International relations ==
=== Twin towns — Sister cities ===
Omiš is twinned with:

- Bol, Croatia
- Havířov, Czech Republic
- Nepomuk, Czech Republic
- Zagorje ob Savi, Slovenia
- San Felice del Molise, Italy
- (Russia) Ryazan, Russian Federation
- Krupina, Slovakia
- Poprad, Slovakia

== Image gallery ==
Church of St. Peter

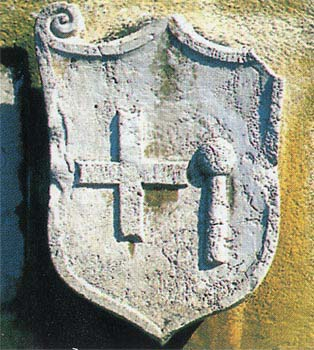
Coat of arms of Omiš

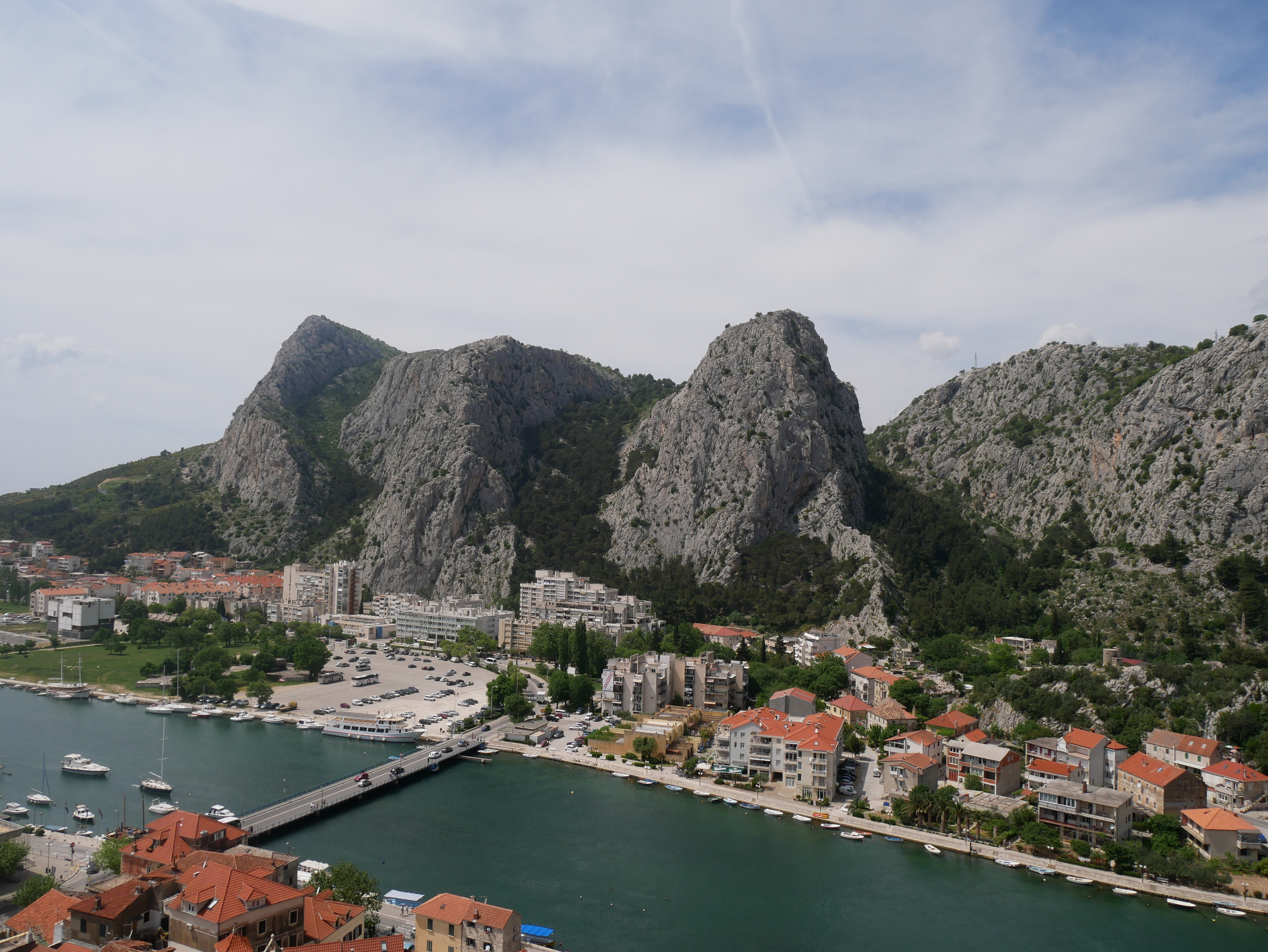
Omis bridge

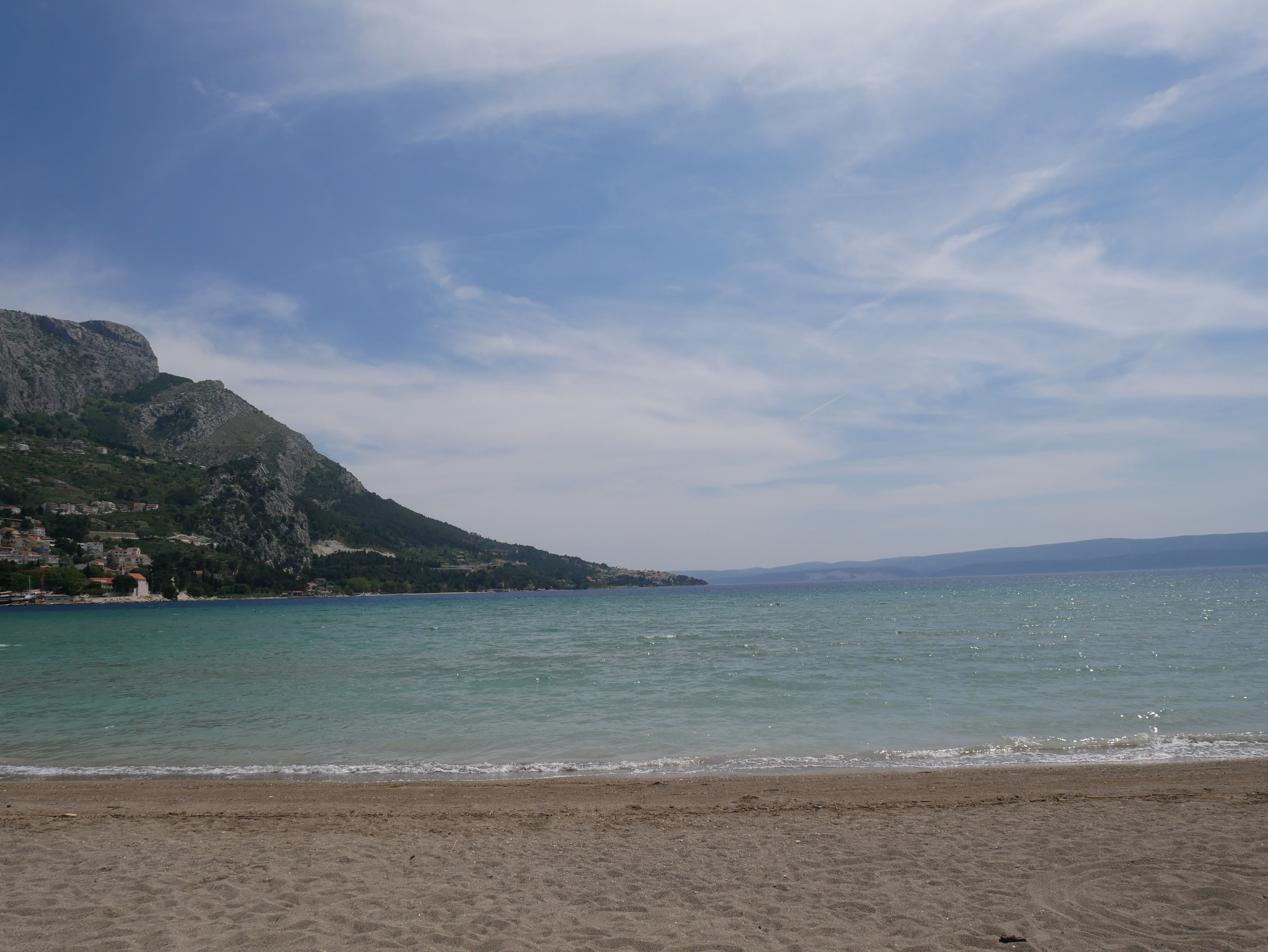
city beach Punta

Old city street

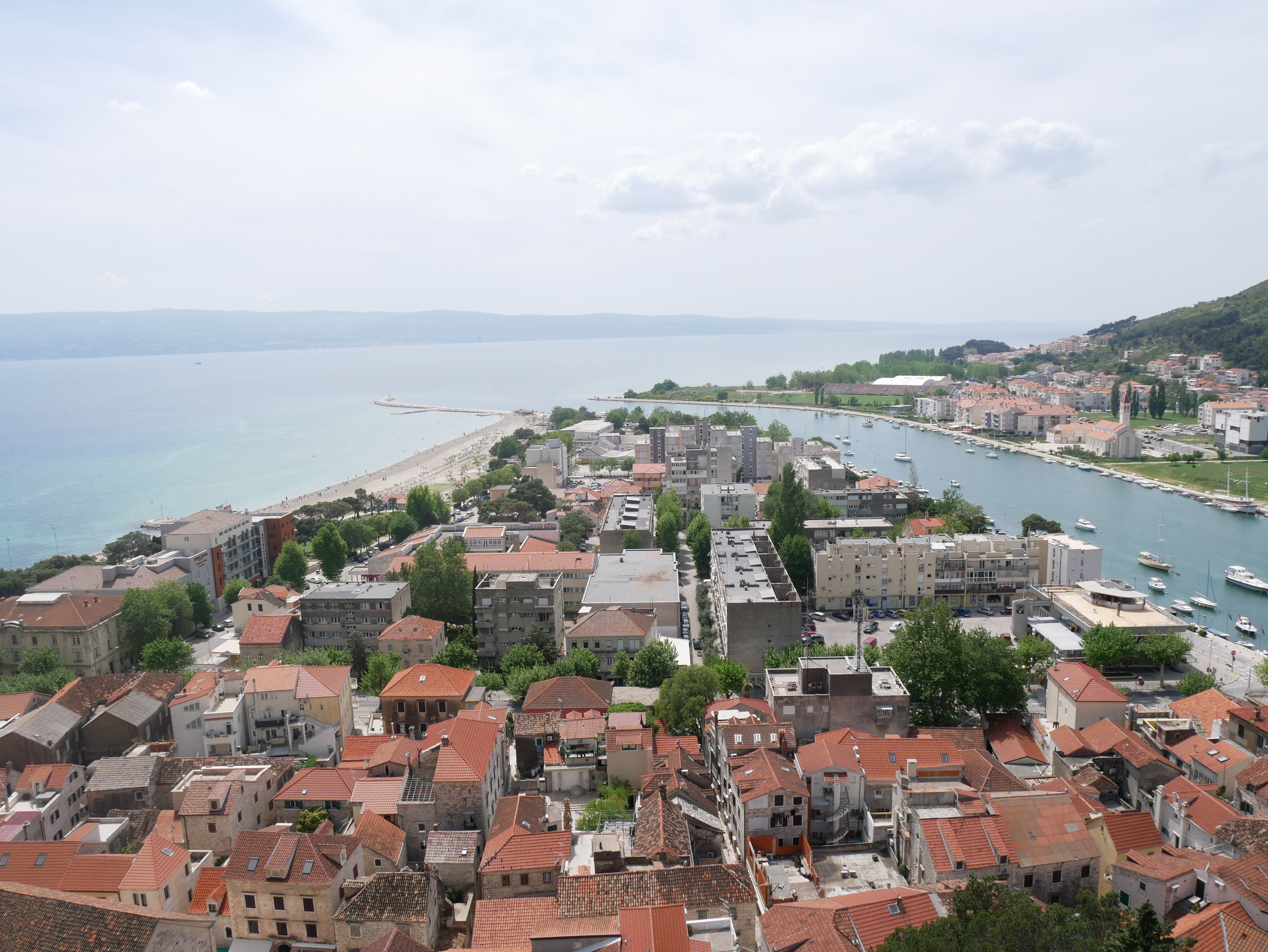
View of Omis from fortress Peovica

Cetina Canyon

== Bibliography ==
- Cresswell, Peterjon; Atkins, Ismay; Dunn, Lily (10 July 2006). Time Out Croatia (First ed.). London, Berkeley & Toronto: Time Out Group Ltd & Ebury Publishing, Random House Ltd. 20 Vauxhall Bridge Road, London SV1V 2SA. ISBN 978-1-904978-70-1.
- Šimunović, Petar (March 2013). "Predantički toponimi u današnjoj (i povijesnoj) Hrvatskoj" [Pre-Roman placenames in present-day (and historical) Croatia] (PDF). Folia onomastica Croatica (in Croatian) (22). Zagreb: Croatian Academy of Sciences and Arts: 147–214.
