= Trnbusi =

Settlement in Split-Dalmatia County, Croatia

- Settlement
- Interactive map of Trnbusi
- Location of Trnbusi in Croatia
- Coordinates: 43°29′46″N 16°47′11″E
- Country: Croatia
- County: Split-Dalmatia
- City: Omiš

Area
  - Total: 19.4 km^{2} (7.5 sq mi)

Population (2021)
  - Total: 176
  - Density: 9.07/km^{2} (23.5/sq mi)
- Time zone: UTC+1 (CET)
  - Summer (DST): UTC+2 (CEST)
- Postal code: 21256 Cista Provo
- Area code: +385 (0)21

Trnbusi is a settlement in the City of Omiš in Croatia. In 2021, its population was 176.

== Demographics ==
Trnbusi: Population trends 1857–2021
v

population	303	367	378	437	488	494	426	449	487	461	406	406	330	277	189	162	176
	1857	1869	1880	1890	1900	1910	1921	1931	1948	1953	1961	1971	1981	1991	2001	2011	2021

Sources: Croatian Bureau of Statistics publications
