= Tugare =

Settlement in Split-Dalmatia County, Croatia

- Settlement
- Interactive map of Tugare
- Location of Tugare in Croatia
- Coordinates: 43°28′01″N 16°40′01″E
- Country: Croatia
- County: Split-Dalmatia
- City: Omiš

Area
  - Total: 12.9 km^{2} (5.0 sq mi)

Population (2021)
  - Total: 875
  - Density: 67.8/km^{2} (176/sq mi)
- Time zone: UTC+1 (CET)
  - Summer (DST): UTC+2 (CEST)
- Postal code: 21000 Split
- Area code: +385 (0)21

Tugare is a settlement in the City of Omiš in Croatia. In 2021, its population was 875.

== Demographics ==
Tugare: Population trends 1857–2021
v

population	411	551	690	743	856	913	814	927	993	747	743	757	713	771	781	885	875
	1857	1869	1880	1890	1900	1910	1921	1931	1948	1953	1961	1971	1981	1991	2001	2011	2021

Sources: Croatian Bureau of Statistics publications
