= Pisak =

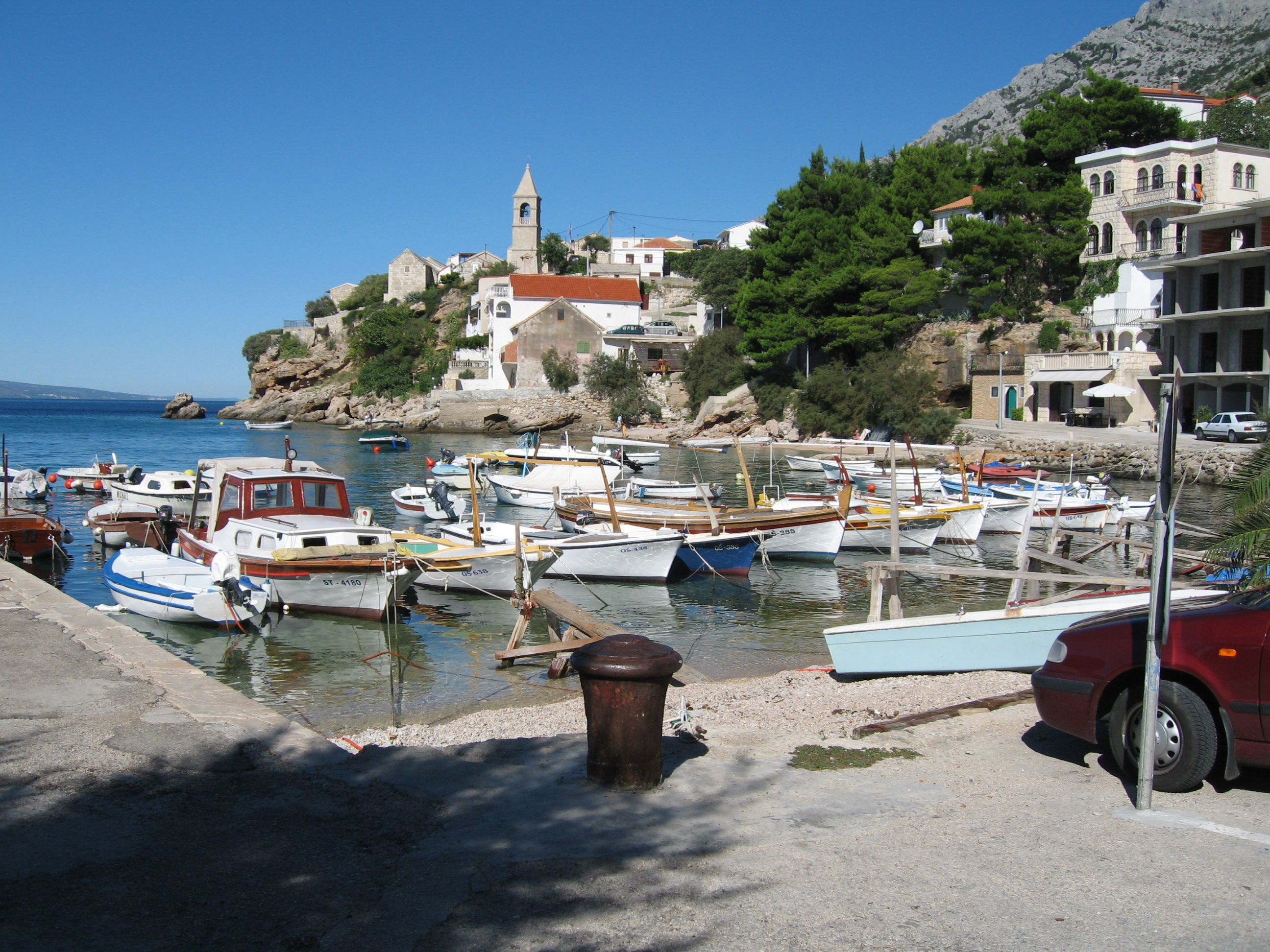

- Location within Croatia
- Coordinates: 43°23′59.09″N 16°51′32.02″E
- Country: Croatia
- Region: Dalmatia
- County: Split-Dalmatia County
- Municipality: Omiš

Area
  - Total: 3.9 km^{2} (1.5 sq mi)

Population (2021)
  - Total: 150
  - Density: 38/km^{2} (100/sq mi)
- Time zone: UTC+1

Pisak is a small tourist settlement within the city of Omiš, Croatia, in Split-Dalmatia County.

The settlement had a population of 202 in 2011. The majority of the population are Croats. Inhabitants are mostly involved in renting accommodation facilities in the tourist season. The actual number of residents is higher because the village has many summer residences, whose owners have permanent residence elsewhere. Pisak is located south of the Adriatic Highway on the Dalmatia coast, approximately 18 km from central Omiš, and 40 km from Split. Pisak is a small and peaceful settlement, once a fishermen's port and now a modern tourist destination. Vrulja under-sea springs are located southeast of Pisak.

The beaches consist mainly of cliffs, rocks and pebble.
