= Slime, Croatia =

Settlement in Split-Dalmatia County, Croatia

Slime
- Settlement
- Interactive map of Slime
- Location of Slime in Croatia
- Coordinates: 43°25′26″N 16°52′06″E
- Country: Croatia
- County: Split-Dalmatia
- City: Omiš

Area
  - Total: 8.9 km^{2} (3.4 sq mi)

Population (2021)
  - Total: 271
  - Density: 30/km^{2} (79/sq mi)
- Time zone: UTC+1 (CET)
  - Summer (DST): UTC+2 (CEST)
- Postal code: 21310 Omiš
- Area code: +385 (0)21

Slime (pronounced [slîme]) is a settlement in the City of Omiš in Croatia. In 2021, its population was 271.

== Demographics ==
Slime: Population trends 1857–2021
v

population	217	213	233	289	337	355	430	493	483	471	478	480	365	361	304	270	271
	1857	1869	1880	1890	1900	1910	1921	1931	1948	1953	1961	1971	1981	1991	2001	2011	2021

Sources: Croatian Bureau of Statistics publications
