= Stanići, Split-Dalmatia County =

Settlement in Split-Dalmatia County, Croatia

Stanići
- Settlement
- Interactive map of Stanići
- Location of Stanići in Croatia
- Coordinates: 43°24′53″N 16°43′40″E
- Country: Croatia
- County: Split-Dalmatia
- City: Omiš

Area
  - Total: 2.2 km^{2} (0.85 sq mi)

Population (2021)
  - Total: 482
  - Density: 220/km^{2} (570/sq mi)
- Time zone: UTC+1 (CET)
  - Summer (DST): UTC+2 (CEST)
- Postal code: 21310 Omiš
- Area code: +385 (0)21

Stanići is a settlement in the City of Omiš in Croatia. In 2021, its population was 482.

== Demographics ==
Stanići: Population trends 1857–2021
v

population			41	43	66	84			117	114	100	88	154	307	502	534	482
	1857	1869	1880	1890	1900	1910	1921	1931	1948	1953	1961	1971	1981	1991	2001	2011	2021

Sources: Croatian Bureau of Statistics publications
