= Mimice =

Settlement in Split-Dalmatia County, Croatia

- Settlement
- Interactive map of Mimice
- Location of Mimice in Croatia
- Coordinates: 43°24′14″N 16°48′47″E
- Country: Croatia
- County: Split-Dalmatia
- City: Omiš

Area
  - Total: 2.5 km^{2} (0.97 sq mi)

Population (2021)
  - Total: 241
  - Density: 96/km^{2} (250/sq mi)
- Time zone: UTC+1 (CET)
  - Summer (DST): UTC+2 (CEST)
- Postal code: 21310 Omiš
- Area code: +385 (0)21

Mimice is a settlement in the City of Omiš in Croatia. In 2021, its population was 241.

== Demographics ==
Mimice: Population trends 1857–2021
v

population				24	39	39			319	306	267	255	198	236	250	216	241
	1857	1869	1880	1890	1900	1910	1921	1931	1948	1953	1961	1971	1981	1991	2001	2011	2021

Sources: Croatian Bureau of Statistics publications
