= Seoca, Croatia =

Settlement in Split-Dalmatia County, Croatia

Seoca
- Settlement
- Interactive map of Seoca
- Location of Seoca in Croatia
- Coordinates: 43°27′49″N 16°48′48″E
- Country: Croatia
- County: Split-Dalmatia
- City: Omiš

Area
  - Total: 6.0 km^{2} (2.3 sq mi)

Population (2021)
  - Total: 132
  - Density: 22/km^{2} (57/sq mi)
- Time zone: UTC+1 (CET)
  - Summer (DST): UTC+2 (CEST)
- Postal code: 21256 Cista Provo
- Area code: +385 (0)21

Seoca is a settlement in the City of Omiš in Croatia. In 2021, its population was 132.

== Demographics ==
Seoca: Population trends 1857–2021
v

population	139		158	228	229	271	264	263	272	257	276	258	195	173	158	140	132
	1857	1869	1880	1890	1900	1910	1921	1931	1948	1953	1961	1971	1981	1991	2001	2011	2021

Sources: Croatian Bureau of Statistics publications
