= Ostrvica, Split-Dalmatia County =

Settlement in Split-Dalmatia County, Croatia

Ostrvica
- Settlement
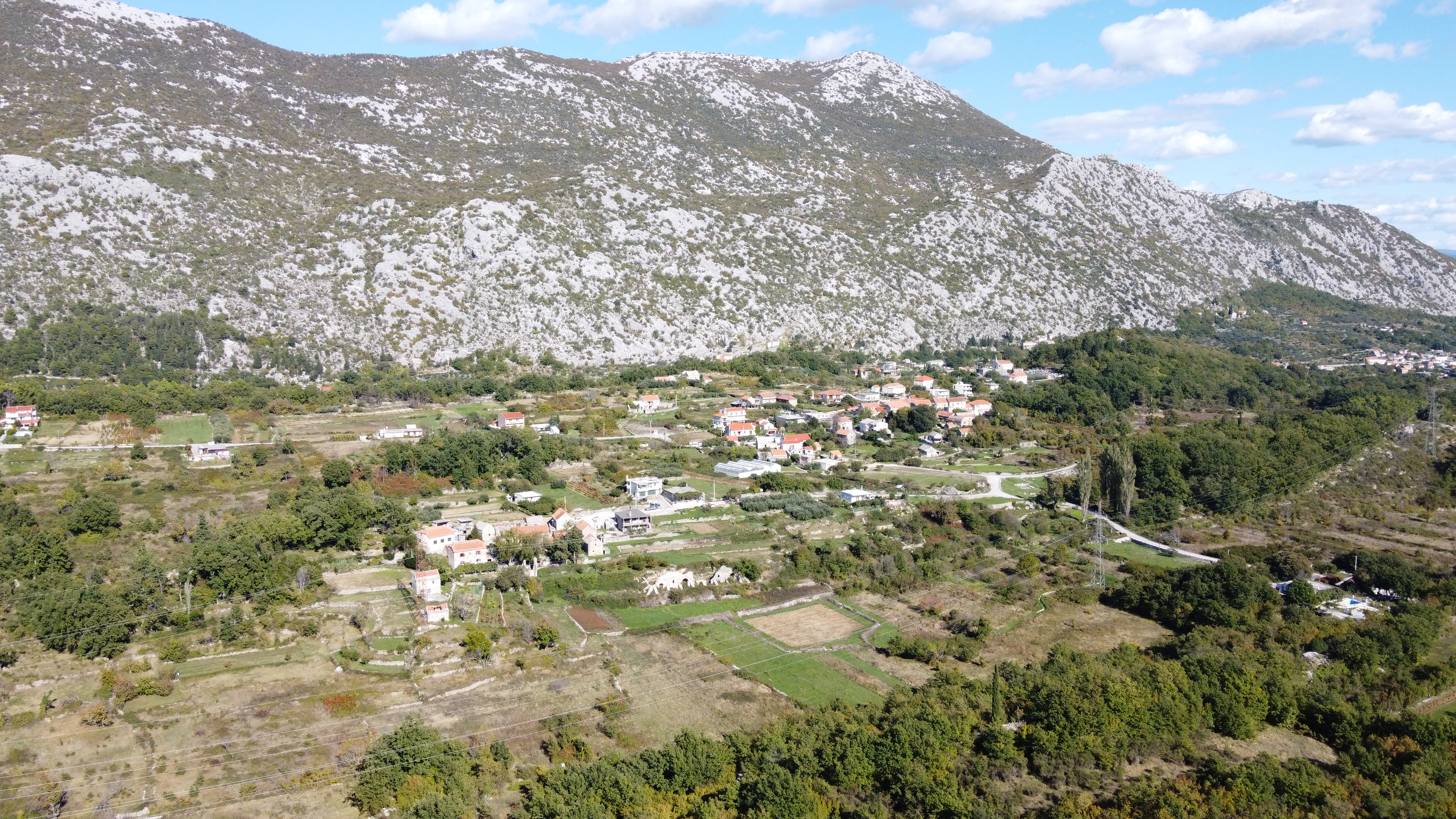
- Ostrvica
- Interactive map of Ostrvica
- Location of Ostrvica in Croatia
- Coordinates: 43°27′28″N 16°44′59″E
- Country: Croatia
- County: Split-Dalmatia
- City: Omiš

Area
  - Total: 3.5 km^{2} (1.4 sq mi)

Population (2021)
  - Total: 191
  - Density: 55/km^{2} (140/sq mi)
- Time zone: UTC+1 (CET)
  - Summer (DST): UTC+2 (CEST)
- Postal code: 21310 Omiš
- Area code: +385 (0)21

Ostrvica is a settlement in the City of Omiš in Croatia. In 2021, its population was 191.

== Demographics ==
Ostrvica: Population trends 1857–2021
v

population	297		149	161	173	182	400	248	191	283	278	245	232	215	210	196	191
	1857	1869	1880	1890	1900	1910	1921	1931	1948	1953	1961	1971	1981	1991	2001	2011	2021

Sources: Croatian Bureau of Statistics publications
