= Nova Sela, Omiš =

Settlement in Split-Dalmatia County, Croatia

Nova Sela
- Settlement
- Interactive map of Nova Sela
- Location of Nova Sela in Croatia
- Coordinates: 43°31′09″N 16°46′59″E
- Country: Croatia
- County: Split-Dalmatia
- City: Omiš

Area
  - Total: 12.3 km^{2} (4.7 sq mi)

Population (2021)
  - Total: 152
  - Density: 12.4/km^{2} (32.0/sq mi)
- Time zone: UTC+1 (CET)
  - Summer (DST): UTC+2 (CEST)
- Postal code: 21256 Cista Provo
- Area code: +385 (0)21

Nova Sela is a settlement in the City of Omiš in Croatia. In 2021, its population was 152.

== Demographics ==
Nova Sela: Population trends 1857–2021
v

population	355	389	414	459	498	569	630	615	723	752	705	728	655	471	286	224	152
	1857	1869	1880	1890	1900	1910	1921	1931	1948	1953	1961	1971	1981	1991	2001	2011	2021

Sources: Croatian Bureau of Statistics publications
