= Čisla =

Settlement in Split-Dalmatia County, Croatia

- Settlement
- Interactive map of Čisla
- Location of Čisla in Croatia
- Coordinates: 43°27′00″N 16°43′59″E
- Country: Croatia
- County: Split-Dalmatia
- City: Omiš

Area
  - Total: 5.2 km^{2} (2.0 sq mi)

Population (2021)
  - Total: 310
  - Density: 60/km^{2} (150/sq mi)
- Time zone: UTC+1 (CET)
  - Summer (DST): UTC+2 (CEST)
- Postal code: 21310 Omiš
- Area code: +385 (0)21

Čisla is a settlement in the City of Omiš in Croatia. In 2021, its population was 310.

== Demographics ==
Čisla: Population trends 1857–2021
v

population	74	407	228	274	304	311	184	286	362	291	276	261	255	268	290	302	310
	1857	1869	1880	1890	1900	1910	1921	1931	1948	1953	1961	1971	1981	1991	2001	2011	2021

Sources: Croatian Bureau of Statistics publications
