= Putišići =

Settlement in Split-Dalmatia County, Croatia

- Settlement
- Interactive map of Putišići
- Location of Putišići in Croatia
- Coordinates: 43°30′43″N 16°42′24″E
- Country: Croatia
- County: Split-Dalmatia
- City: Omiš

Area
  - Total: 3.4 km^{2} (1.3 sq mi)

Population (2021)
  - Total: 37
  - Density: 11/km^{2} (28/sq mi)
- Time zone: UTC+1 (CET)
  - Summer (DST): UTC+2 (CEST)
- Postal code: 21204 Dugopolje
- Area code: +385 (0)21

Putišići is a settlement in the City of Omiš in Croatia. In 2021, its population was 37.

== Demographics ==
Putišići: Population trends 1857–2021
v

population	91		147	104	108	108	184	185	153	167	155	132	120	69	56	46	37
	1857	1869	1880	1890	1900	1910	1921	1931	1948	1953	1961	1971	1981	1991	2001	2011	2021

Sources: Croatian Bureau of Statistics publications
