= Smolonje =

Settlement in Split-Dalmatia County, Croatia

- Settlement
- Interactive map of Smolonje
- Location of Smolonje in Croatia
- Coordinates: 43°26′52″N 16°46′38″E
- Country: Croatia
- County: Split-Dalmatia
- City: Omiš

Area
  - Total: 3.9 km^{2} (1.5 sq mi)

Population (2021)
  - Total: 75
  - Density: 19/km^{2} (50/sq mi)
- Time zone: UTC+1 (CET)
  - Summer (DST): UTC+2 (CEST)
- Postal code: 21310 Omiš
- Area code: +385 (0)21

Smolonje is a settlement in the City of Omiš in Croatia. In 2021, its population was 75.

== Demographics ==
Smolonje: Population trends 1857–2021
v

population	87		115	155	166	164	160	183	178	168	162	150	147	105	68	79	75
	1857	1869	1880	1890	1900	1910	1921	1931	1948	1953	1961	1971	1981	1991	2001	2011	2021

Sources: Croatian Bureau of Statistics publications
