= Svinišće =

Settlement in Split-Dalmatia County, Croatia

- Settlement
- Interactive map of Svinišće
- Location of Svinišće in Croatia
- Coordinates: 43°25′32″N 16°46′58″E
- Country: Croatia
- County: Split-Dalmatia
- City: Omiš

Area
  - Total: 6.8 km^{2} (2.6 sq mi)

Population (2021)
  - Total: 87
  - Density: 13/km^{2} (33/sq mi)
- Time zone: UTC+1 (CET)
  - Summer (DST): UTC+2 (CEST)
- Postal code: 21310 Omiš
- Area code: +385 (0)21

Svinišće is a settlement in the City of Omiš in Croatia. In 2021, its population was 87.

== Demographics ==
Svinišće: Population trends 1857–2021
v

population	234	450	385	370	458	486	707	845	608	612	629	495	266	180	126	98	87
	1857	1869	1880	1890	1900	1910	1921	1931	1948	1953	1961	1971	1981	1991	2001	2011	2021

Sources: Croatian Bureau of Statistics publications
