= Gornji Dolac =

Settlement in Split-Dalmatia County, Croatia

- Settlement
- Interactive map of Gornji Dolac
- Location of Gornji Dolac in Croatia
- Coordinates: 43°29′46″N 16°43′58″E
- Country: Croatia
- County: Split-Dalmatia
- City: Omiš

Area
  - Total: 14.9 km^{2} (5.8 sq mi)

Population (2021)
  - Total: 107
  - Density: 7.18/km^{2} (18.6/sq mi)
- Time zone: UTC+1 (CET)
  - Summer (DST): UTC+2 (CEST)
- Postal code: 21204 Dugopolje
- Area code: +385 (0)21

Gornji Dolac is a settlement in the City of Omiš in Croatia. In 2021, its population was 107.

== Demographics ==
Gornji Dolac: Population trends 1857–2021
v

population	401	374	328	474	502	504	587	569	507	530	476	379	234	196	156	119	107
	1857	1869	1880	1890	1900	1910	1921	1931	1948	1953	1961	1971	1981	1991	2001	2011	2021

Sources: Croatian Bureau of Statistics publications
