= Srijane =

Settlement in Split-Dalmatia County, Croatia

- Settlement
- Interactive map of Srijane
- Location of Srijane in Croatia
- Coordinates: 43°31′05″N 16°43′41″E
- Country: Croatia
- County: Split-Dalmatia
- City: Omiš

Area
  - Total: 16.2 km^{2} (6.3 sq mi)

Population (2021)
  - Total: 223
  - Density: 13.8/km^{2} (35.7/sq mi)
- Time zone: UTC+1 (CET)
  - Summer (DST): UTC+2 (CEST)
- Postal code: 21204 Dugopolje
- Area code: +385 (0)21

Srijane is a settlement in the City of Omiš in Croatia. In 2021, its population was 223.

== Demographics ==
Srijane: Population trends 1857–2021
v

population	430	561	541	531	595	666	693	674	790	763	1438	630	464	325	263	270	223
	1857	1869	1880	1890	1900	1910	1921	1931	1948	1953	1961	1971	1981	1991	2001	2011	2021

Sources: Croatian Bureau of Statistics publications
