= Borak, Croatia =

Settlement in Split-Dalmatia County, Croatia

Borak
- Settlement
- Interactive map of Borak
- Location of Borak in Croatia
- Coordinates: 43°26′42″N 16°41′35″E
- Country: Croatia
- County: Split-Dalmatia
- City: Omiš

Area
  - Total: 4.1 km^{2} (1.6 sq mi)

Population (2021)
  - Total: 199
  - Density: 49/km^{2} (130/sq mi)
- Time zone: UTC+1 (CET)
  - Summer (DST): UTC+2 (CEST)
- Postal code: 21310 Omiš
- Area code: +385 (0)21

Borak is a settlement in the City of Omiš in Croatia. In 2021, its population was 199.

== Demographics ==
Borak: Population trends 1857–2021
v

| population | | | 133 | 144 | 141 | 150 | | | 175 | 153 | 193 | 138 | 178 | 135 | 145 | 158 | 199 |
| | 1857 | 1869 | 1880 | 1890 | 1900 | 1910 | 1921 | 1931 | 1948 | 1953 | 1961 | 1971 | 1981 | 1991 | 2001 | 2011 | 2021 |

Sources: Croatian Bureau of Statistics publications
