= List of lighthouses in Greece =

This is a list of lighthouses in Greece.

== Lighthouses ==
| Name | Image | Water body | Region | Coordinates | Year built | Tower height | Focal height | Range | Notes |
|---|---|---|---|---|---|---|---|---|---|
| Agion Theodoron Lighthouse | | Mediterranean Sea | Cephalonia | Argostoli 38°11′29″N 20°28′04″E | 1828 | 8 m | 11 m | | Lighthouse was built in 1828 by the English under command of Charles Napier. It was destroyed by the earthquakes of 1953 and rebuilt according to the original architectural plan of 1828. It joined the Greek lighthouse network in 1863 with the annexation of the Ionian Islands. |
| Agios Nikolaos Lighthouse | | Aegean Sea | Rhodes | Agios Nikolaos Fortress 36°27′04″N 28°13′40″E | 1863 | 6 m | 25 m | 11 nmi (20 km) | Built by the French, this lighthouse is situated atop St. Elmo tower in St. Nicholas Fortress in Mandraki Harbor. Its flashing, white light was able to be seen 14 miles (23 kilometres) away. The tower, made of masonry, was rebuilt in 2007. The lantern was also refitted and restored. It now contains a 300mm optic (produced by the Tideland company). |
| Armenistis Lighthouse | | Aegean Sea | Mykonos | Cyclades | 1891 | 19 m | ? m | | |
| Cape Akrotiri Lighthouse | | Aegean Sea | Santorini | Akrotiri 36°21′27″N 25°21′25″E | 1892 | 10 m | 100 m | 24 nmi (44 km) | This lighthouse was built in 1892 by the French Lighthouse Company. The lighthouse initially operated with oil and radiation around 23 nmi (43 km). It was extinguished during World War II and resumed operation in 1945. In 1983 it was electrified and became fully automated in 1988. |
| Cape Lefkada Lighthouse | | Ionian Sea | Lefkada | Cape Doukato 38°33′48″N 20°32′33″E | 1890 | 14 m | 70 m | | Lighthouse was inactive during World War II and reopened after 1945. It has been electrified since 1982. Tower height is 14 meters, focal height is 70 meters. |
| Lighthouse of Lefkada Fortress | | Ionian Sea | Lefkada | Castle of Santa Maura 38°50′43″N 20°43′11″E | 1861 | 6.5 m | 17 m | | Lighthouse is located on the walls of the Castle of Santa Maura at the edge of the bridge of the canal of Lefkada. |
| Chania Lighthouse | | Mediterranean Sea | Crete | Chania | 1864/2006 | 26 metres (85 feet) | 26 metres (85 feet) | | This is an active lighthouse. It has cylindrical shape and is made of stone. Atop is a lantern and gallery. The structure is mounted on a stone base that is much older. It flashes red each 2.5 seconds. In 2006, it was restored. |
| Fiskardo Lighthouse | | Ionian Sea | Cephalonia | Fiskardo 38°27′39″N 20°34′55″E | 1892 | 14.2 m | 27 m | | Lighthouse was built near the old Venetian lighthouse and essentially replaced it. The original building was severely damaged during the 1953 earthquakes and was almost completely rebuilt. |
| Kastri Lighthouse | | Ionian Sea | Ionian Islands | Othonoi 39°51′53″N 19°25′45″E | 1872 | 10 m | 13.4 m | 21 nmi (39 km) | |
| Patras Lighthouse | | Gulf of Patras | Western Greece | Patras | 1999 | 13 m | | Inactive | Replica of lighthouse at Saint Nickolas Pier demolished in 1972. It was rebuilt near Saint Andrew's church as a tourist attraction. |
| Prasonisi Lighthouse | | Mediterranean Sea | Rhodes | Prasonisi 35.878453°N 27.750848°E | 1890/1996 | 14 m | 65 m | | First built by French Lighthouse Company it joined the Greek Lighthouse Network in 1947. |
| Rethymno Lighthouse | | Mediterranean Sea | Crete | Rethymno 35°22′13″N 24°28′39″E | 1864 | ? m | ? m | | This lighthouse is located at the tip of a stone fortification. It consists of a lantern and gallery atop a stone column resting on a square base of stone. The top third of the column round, the bottom two-thirds being octagonal. The structure is unpained. The Venetian lighthouse of the Port of Rethymnon is the second largest Egyptian Lighthouse of Crete, after the lighthouse of Chania. |
| Sidero (Corfu) Lighthouse | | Ionian Sea | Ionian Islands | Corfu | 1828 | 8 metres (26 feet) | 78 metres (256 feet) | | Also known as Corfu Lighthouse It emits two, white flashes every 6 seconds. The structure consists of a round, stone tower with a lantern and gallery atop. Attached is a single storey, lightkeepers cottage also made of stone. This lighthouse is not painted, except for the roof, which is green. It was built by the British to help them navigate to the Ionian Islands, the location of their main naval base at the time. |

== See also ==
- Lists of lighthouses and lightvessels
