= Marcantonio Giustinian =

Doge of Venice from 1684 to 1688

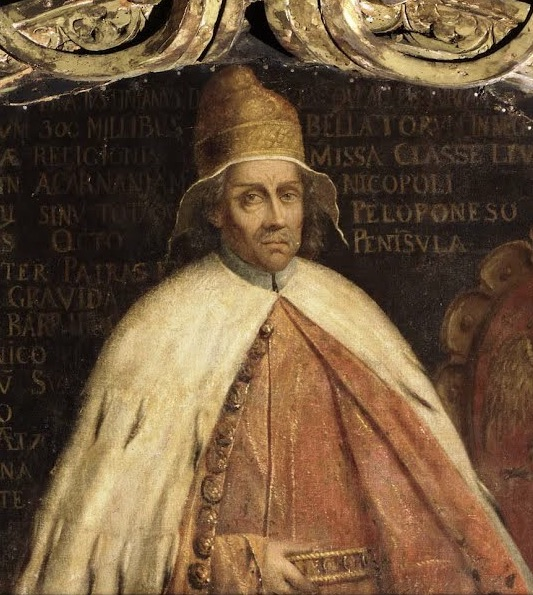

Doge of Venice
- In office 1684–1688
- Preceded by: Alvise Contarini
- Succeeded by: Francesco Morosini

Personal details
- Born: 2 March 1619 Venice, Republic of Venice
- Died: 23 March 1688 (aged 69) Venice

Marcantonio Giustinian (2 March 1619 – 23 March 1688) was the 107th Doge of Venice, reigning from his election on 26 January 1684 until his death. Giustiniani was the quintessential Doge of the Republic of Venice, taking little interest in affairs of state. He had a little role in the conduct of the Morean War (1684-1699), which was raging during his time as Doge, though a number of military victories were secured by provveditore Francesco Morosini, who would later be Giustinian's successor as Doge.

== Background, 1619–1684 ==
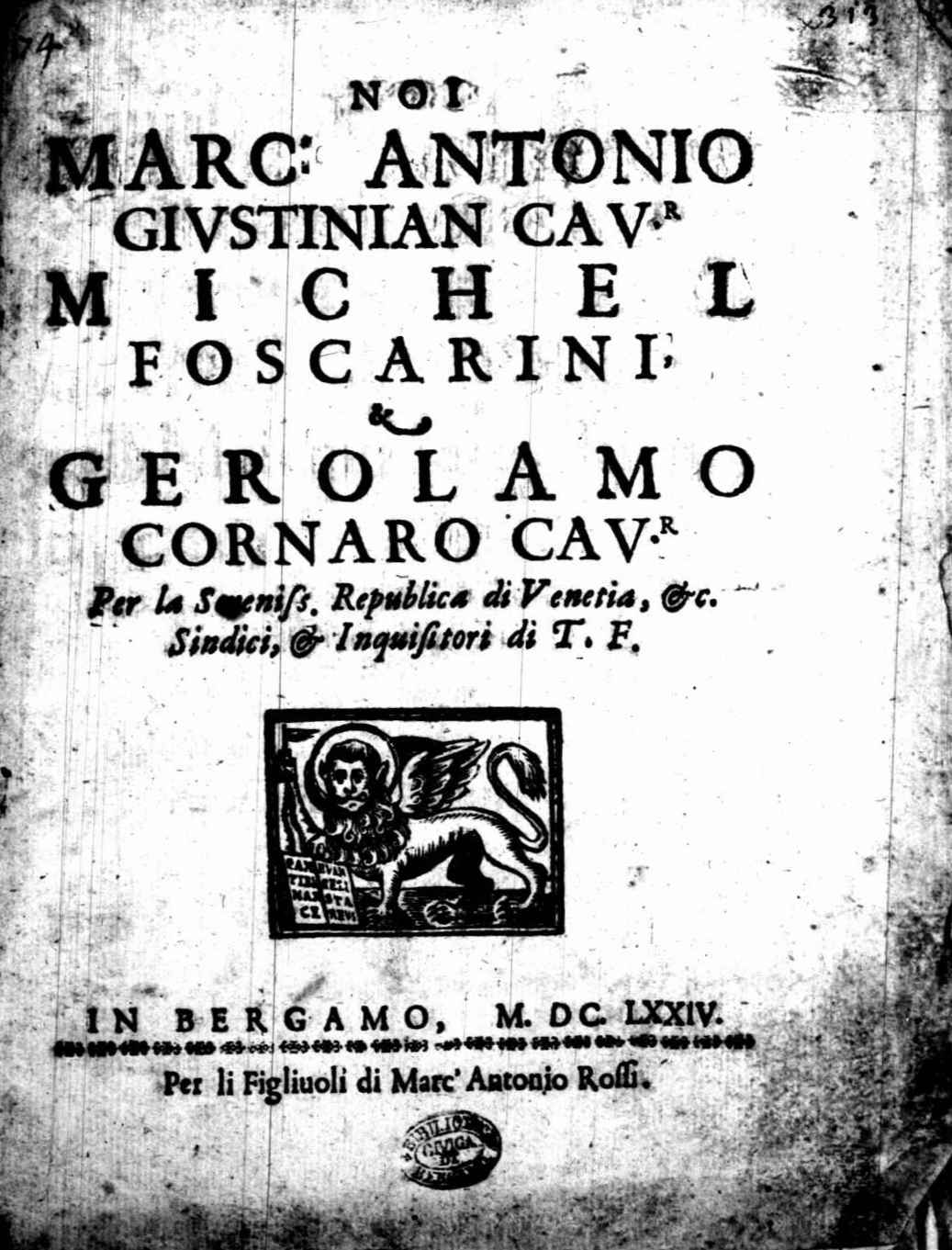
Marcantonio Giustinian, Michele Foscarini and Gerolamo Cornaro, Ordini relativi alle paghe delle genti d'arme, 1674

Marcantonio Giustinian was born in Venice, the son of Pietro Giustinian and his wife Marina. From a rich family, in his youth he was given the nickname, Budella d'oro. A highly cultured man who spoke several languages, Giustinian served as the Most Serene Republic's Ambassador to the Kingdom of France. While in France, Giustinian used his great oratorical skills to convince France to provide Venice with funds that enabled it to carry on the Cretan War (1645–1669). Giustinian became a member of the Council of Ten, and held various offices, but never served in the most important positions. Giustinian never married, or even had sex with a woman, and he liked to boast that he had thereby avoided sin. He died in Venice.

== Reign as Doge, 1684–1688 ==
Following the death of Doge Alvise Contarini on January 15, 1684, Giustinian was elected as Doge on January 26, 1684. This move surprised some, who believed that Francesco Morosini was elected Doge, but the Council preferred a pliant doge whom they could control, while Morosini was able to lead its military campaigns. This strategy led to Giustinian's reign being a time of military victories for the Republic, which were exciting for Venetians who had spent decades watching their empire decline, suffering military defeats, engaging in prolonged sieges, and generally being forced to agree to onerous terms in peace treaties. In 1686 and 1687, Morosini secured several dramatic victories over the Ottoman Empire, conquering Preveza, Kalamata, Navarino and the island of Santa Maura.

Giustinian was a modest man who could not hope to compete with the martial victories of Morosini. During his reign as Doge, he was content to host banquets and festivals, and he gained a reputation for going to church so often that he was given the nickname of "St. Zuanino" or "the Doge of the Te Deum". In his four-and-a-half-year reign, all major decisions were left to his advisers, a fact which led some Venetians to criticize him.

Giustinian died on March 23, 1688, following a failed surgery. Later, a humorous poem circulated about the two attending physicians, Ton and Dolfin (whose names translate as tuna and dolphin), claiming that the doge had been killed by two fish.

== Works ==
- Ordini e terminationi nel proposito del territorio di Bergamo li 4 aprile 1673 (in Italian). Bergamo: Marc'Antonio Rossi, figli. 1673.
- Ordini et regole fatte per la Comunità de gl'Orzi Nuovi (in Italian). Brescia: Giovanni Giacomo Vignadotti. 1673.
- Ordini, dichiarazioni e limitazioni in proposito di privilegi et esenzioni dai dazi nella città di Bergamo l'anno 1673 (in Italian). 1673.
- Ordini et regole fatte per il territorio di Brescia (in Italian). Brescia: Giovanni Giacomo Vignadotti. 1674.
- Ordini et regole fatte per la Comunità di Lonato (in Italian). Brescia: Giovanni Giacomo Vignadotti. 1674.
- Ordini relativi alle paghe delle genti d'arme (in Italian). Bergamo: Marc'Antonio Rossi, figli. 1674.
- Ordini e terminazioni stabilite in proposito dei notai e coadiutori del Palazzo (in Italian). Bergamo: fratelli Rossi. 1732.

Political offices
Preceded by Alvise Contarini	Doge of Venice; 1684–1688	Succeeded by Francesco Morosini
