= Girolamo Corner =

Venetian politician (1632–1690)

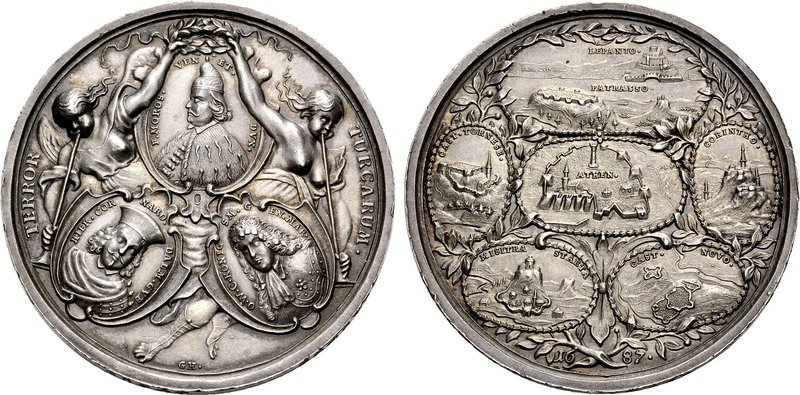
Medal commemorating the Venetian victories in the Morean War, struck by Georg Hautsch in Nuremberg in 1687. Corner is shown as one of the main Venetian commanders in the lower left of the obverse.

Girolamo Corner or Cornaro (25 June 1632 – 1 October 1690) was a Venetian nobleman and statesman. He served in high military posts during the Morean War against the Ottoman Empire, leading the Venetian conquest of Castelnuovo and Knin in Dalmatia, the capture of Monemvasia in Greece and of Valona and Kanina in Albania.

== Life ==
=== Origin and family ===
Girolamo Corner was born in Venice on 25 June 1632, as the third of four surviving sons of Andrea Corner and Morosina Morosini. He belonged to the della Regina branch of the House of Corner, one of the most distinguished families of the Venetian patriciate. As a younger son, he had to seek his own wife, without financial support from his family. He married Cornelia Corner, who brought with her a dowry of 42,000 ducats, and had five sons with her. The affair created a rift with his brothers, which was exacerbated further after the death of their father at the Siege of Rethymno in 1646, and the enormous debts left by him. In 1648, Girolamo and his older brother Giorgio demanded the division of the family inheritance among the brothers, leading to a long series of lawsuits and the complete estrangement of Girolamo and Giorgio from the other two brothers, Caterino and Federico.

=== Political career ===
Girolamo followed a conventional political career, being elected twice as a member of the Savi agli Ordini (in 1657 and 1659), a post typically earmarked for young nobles to gain experience in public affairs. He then served in fiscal magistracies, as member of the Ufficiali alle Cazude in 1659–1660, of the Ufficiali ai Dieci Uffici in 1663–1664, and of the Savi alle Decime in 1665–1666, as well as director in the Banco del Giro and health commissioner (Provveditore alla Sanità) in 1667–1668.

In 1666, Girolamo was elected for the first time to the Venetian Senate, and went on to hold some of the highest offices in the Republic, as member of the Council of Ten in 1668–1669 and again in 1670–1671 and of the Savi di Terraferma in 1669. He also held minor posts as Provveditore sui Beni Comunali, Provveditore sui Feudi, Provveditore all'Armar, and as Savio all'Eresia. In 1669, following the death of his brother Caterino in the Siege of Candia, he was named a Knight of the Order of Saint Mark.

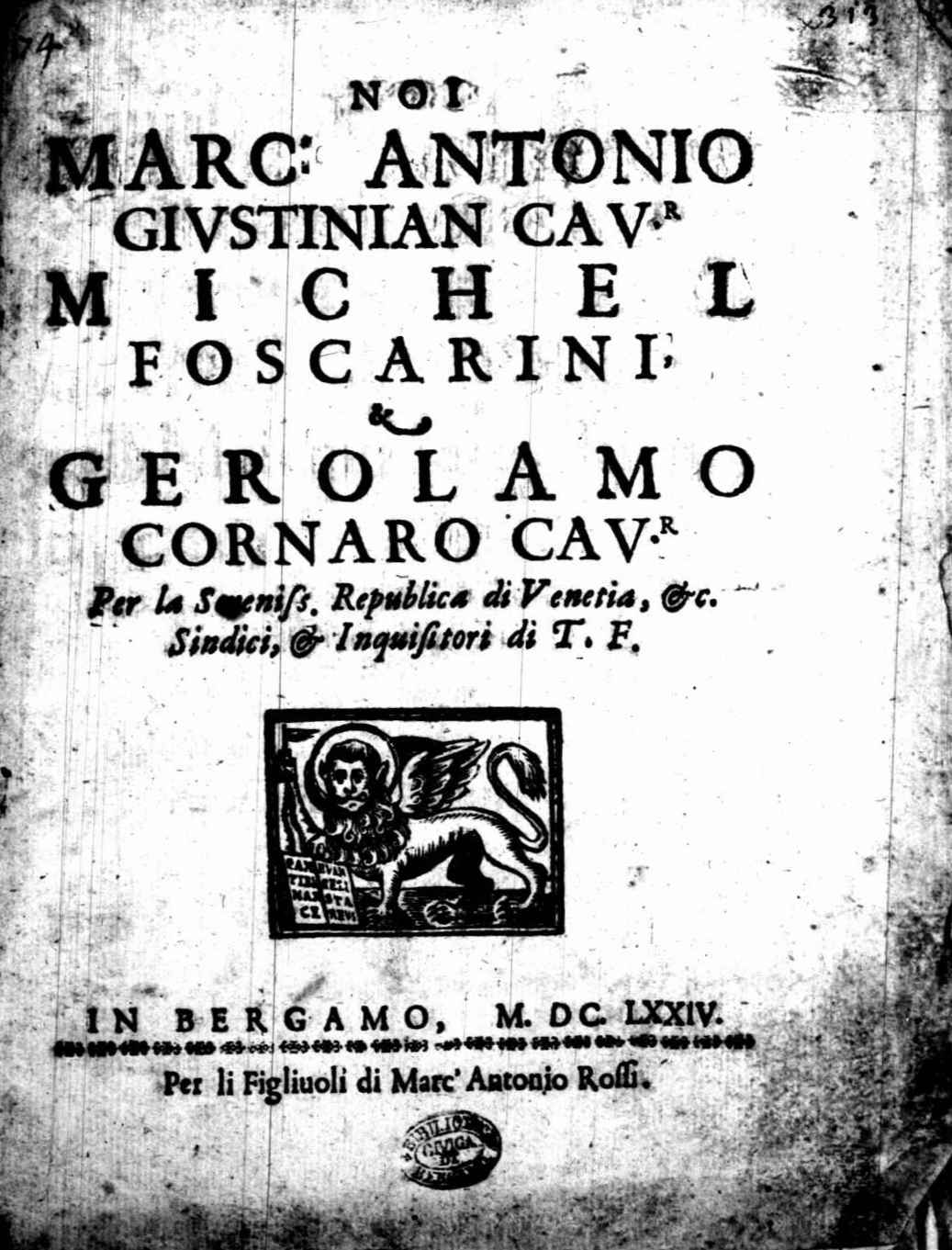
Cover of a regulation about soldiers' wages, published by Girolamo Corner, Marcantonio Giustinian and Michele Foscarini in 1674

In 1672, along with the future doge Marcantonio Giustinian and Michele Foscarini, he was named to the powerful and sensitive post of Sindaco e Inquisitore in Terraferma, an extraordinary commission tasked with reviewing the affairs of the Venetian administration in the Domini di Terraferma, Venice's Italian domains. The administration of the Terraferma had been neglected while the Cretan War commanded the attention of the Republic, and abuses and malpractices had increased dramatically. The three sindici were empowered to review all administrative acts, judicial cases and the conduct of officials for the last ten years. The sindici began their systematic and efficient work in the territories beyond the Mincio River, before moving to Verona in January 1674. The commission continued its work until 1677, but in February 1674 Girolamo was elected as governor-general of the fortress city of Palmanova, and replaced by Antonio Barbarigo.

Girolamo remained at Palmanova for two years, repairing its fortifications and sending memoranda to Venice with proposals on reviving the city and its economy. After his return to Venice, he was elected ducal councillor in 1677, to a second term at the Council of Ten in 1678, while also serving as state inquisitor and Provveditore sopra i Beni Inculti. In 1679, he was sent to a two-year stint as governor-general of Venetian Dalmatia (Provveditore Generale di Dalmazia), during which he busied himself with trying to address the declining population and the endemic economic and social problems of the province. In this post he also had his first direct contact with the Ottoman Empire, taking care not to provide any pretexts for conflict by prohibiting cross-border raids and rigorously applying the peace terms and implementing justice in affairs concerning Ottoman subjects.

=== War against the Turks ===
After the end of his tenure in Dalmatia, in June 1682 Girolamo moved to the pinnacle of the Venetian overseas administration, as Provveditore Generale da Mar. During his tenure he reformed the fiscal administration of Corfu and the tax system in Cephalonia, and tried to address the problems caused by the overproduction of Zante currants on the one hand, and Ottoman competition on the other; when the Morean War broke out during his tenure, he did not hesitate to launch raids on the Ottoman-ruled mainland with no other aim than destroying the rival currant production.

As Provveditore Generale da Mar, Girolamo was the chief Venetian commander present in the theatre before the arrival of the new Captain General of the Sea, Francesco Morosini. Morosini was a political rival of Girolamo, as both men aspired to rise to the dogate. Girolamo tried to preempt Morosini and seize the fortress of Santa Maura (Lefkada), which he believed to be lightly defended, before the arrival of the fleet from Venice. With a small force he sailed from Corfu to the island, but finding the fortress strongly garrisoned, he turned back. As a result of this misadventure, Cornaro was sidelined for the first year of the war. On the end of his tenure in November 1684, he returned to Venice, and was elected as one of the Savi del Consiglio for the first half of 1685, and then as Provveditore all'Armar. The latter assignment was interrupted in December 1685, when he was sent back to Dalmatia to take over once more as Provveditore Generale of Dalmatia, replacing Pietro Valier, who had been dismissed after failing to capture Segna (Senj).

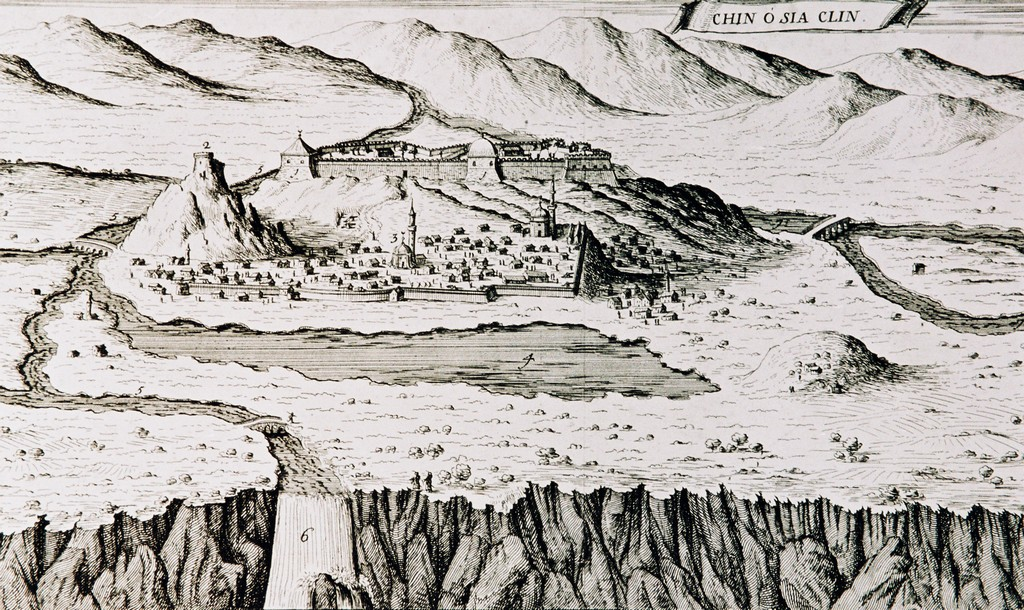
The town of Knin with its fortress around 1688

The situation in Dalmatia was disastrous for Venice, with its military forces in the area depleted, and the Turks raiding almost as far as the capital, Zara (Zadar). Girolamo imposed iron discipline and displayed an "audacity bordering on recklessness", according to Renzo Derosas. First he pushed back the attacks of the Ottoman pashas, before going over to the offensive and capturing Castelnuovo (Herceg Novi) in 1687 and Knin in 1688. In the latter siege, he also captured the pasha of Bosnia, Mehmed Pasha Atlagić. Within three years, Girolamo not only secured Venetian Dalmatia, but added to it a profitable territory 70 miles wide and 300 long; for his success, he was named Procurator of Saint Mark.

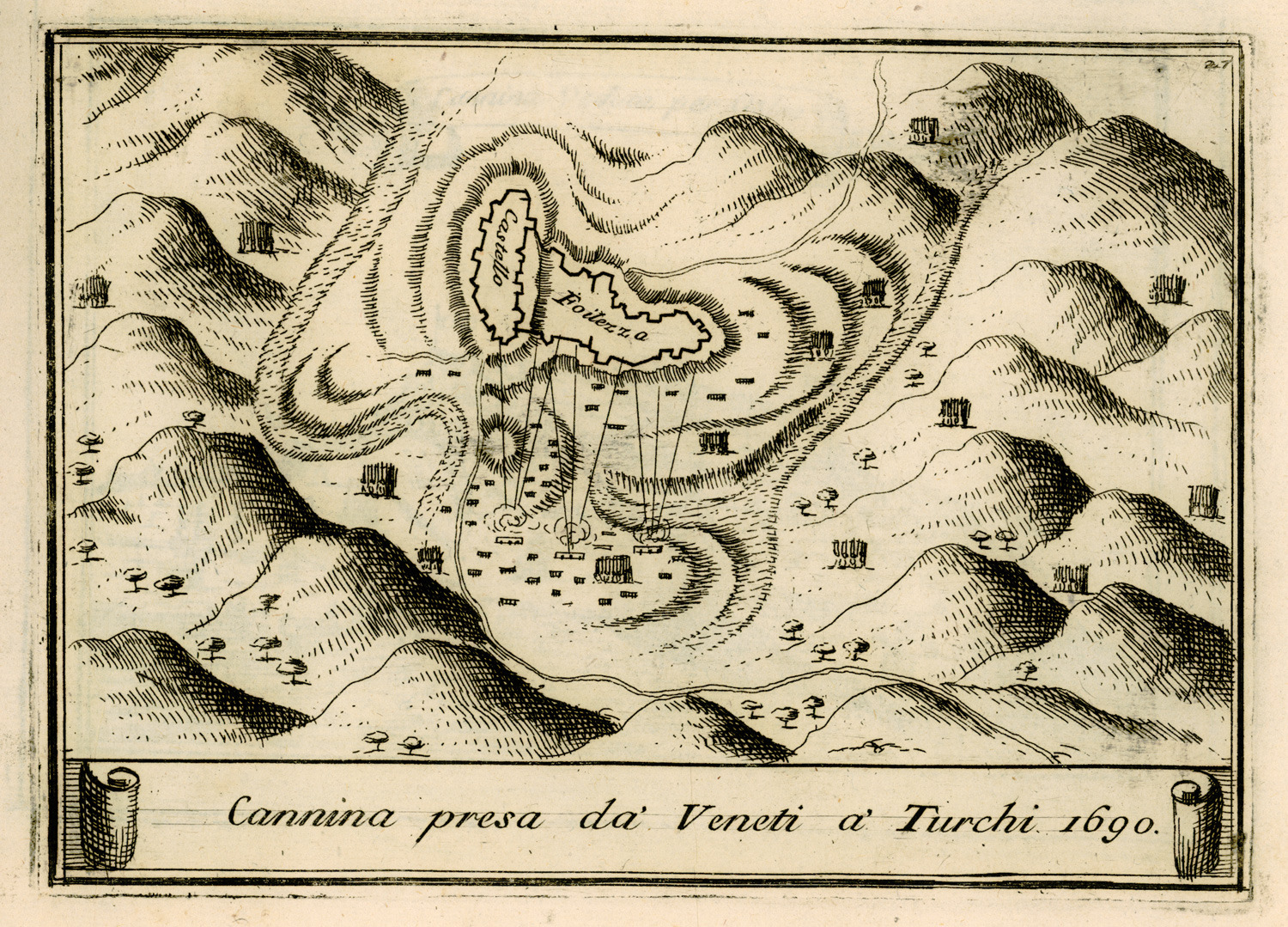
The Siege of Kanina, by Vincenzo Coronelli

In March 1689, Girolamo was elected again as Provveditore Generale da Mar, and joined the Siege of Monemvasia, the last Ottoman stronghold in the Morea. The siege was led by Morosini, who had been elected doge in 1688. Morosini and Corner could not stand each other, and Morosini shortly after left the siege, using an illness as pretext, and returned to Venice. This left Girolamo as the de facto commander-in-chief of the Venetian forces. He continued the siege, culminating in the capture of Monemvasia on 12 August 1690. The Venetian army then moved to the Albanian coast, where the Greeks of Himara had rebelled against the Turks. On 11 September the Venetians landed, and captured the fortress of Kanina on 17 September and the port town of Valona on the next day, after its Ottoman garrison evacuated it. This success allowed the Venetians to expand the area under their control along the coasts and interior of Epirus to Argyrokastron, Himara, Souli, and even the vicinity of Arta, but an attempt to capture the port of Durazzo further north had to be aborted due to adverse weather. Returning to Valona, he fell ill due to an epidemic disease and died on 1 October 1690.

== Works as Sindaco e Inquisitore in Terraferma ==
- Ordini e terminationi nel proposito del territorio di Bergamo li 4 aprile 1673 (in Italian). Bergamo: Marc'Antonio Rossi, figli. 1673.
- Ordini et regole fatte per la Comunità de gl'Orzi Nuovi (in Italian). Brescia: Giovanni Giacomo Vignadotti. 1673.
- Ordini, dichiarazioni e limitazioni in proposito di privilegi et esenzioni dai dazi nella città di Bergamo l'anno 1673 (in Italian). 1673.
- Ordini et regole fatte per il territorio di Brescia (in Italian). Brescia: Giovanni Giacomo Vignadotti. 1674.
- Ordini et regole fatte per la Comunità di Lonato (in Italian). Brescia: Giovanni Giacomo Vignadotti. 1674.
- Ordini relativi alle paghe delle genti d'arme (in Italian). Bergamo: Marc'Antonio Rossi, figli. 1674.
- Ordini e terminazioni stabilite in proposito dei notai e coadiutori del Palazzo (in Italian). Bergamo: fratelli Rossi. 1732.

== Sources ==
- Chasiotis, Ioannis (1975). "Η κάμψη της Οθωμανικής δυνάμεως" [The decline of Ottoman power]. In Christopoulos, Georgios A. & Bastias, Ioannis K. (eds.). Ιστορία του Ελληνικού Έθνους, Τόμος ΙΑ΄: Ο Ελληνισμός υπό ξένη κυριαρχία (περίοδος 1669 - 1821), Τουρκοκρατία - Λατινοκρατία [History of the Greek Nation, Volume XI: Hellenism under Foreign Rule (Period 1669 - 1821), Turkocracy – Latinocracy] (in Greek). Athens: Ekdotiki Athinon. ISBN 978-960-213-100-8.
- Derosas, Renzo (1983). "CORNER, Girolamo". Dizionario Biografico degli Italiani (in Italian). Vol. 29: Cordier–Corvo. Rome: Istituto dell'Enciclopedia Italiana. ISBN 978-88-12-00032-6.
- Paton, James Morton (1940). The Venetians in Athens, 1687–1688, from the Istoria of Cristoforo Ivanovich. Gennadeion Monographs I. Cambridge, Massachusetts: Harvard University Press.
- Setton, Kenneth Meyer (1991). Venice, Austria, and the Turks in the Seventeenth Century. Philadelphia: The American Philosophical Society. ISBN 0-87169-192-2.
