= Siege of Santa Maura =

Siege of Santa Maura can refer to one of the following sieges of the fortress and island of Santa Maura (now Lefkada):

- Siege of Santa Maura (1684) by the Republic of Venice
- Siege of Santa Maura (1810) by the British
