= Francesco Morosini =

Doge of Venice from 1688 to 1694

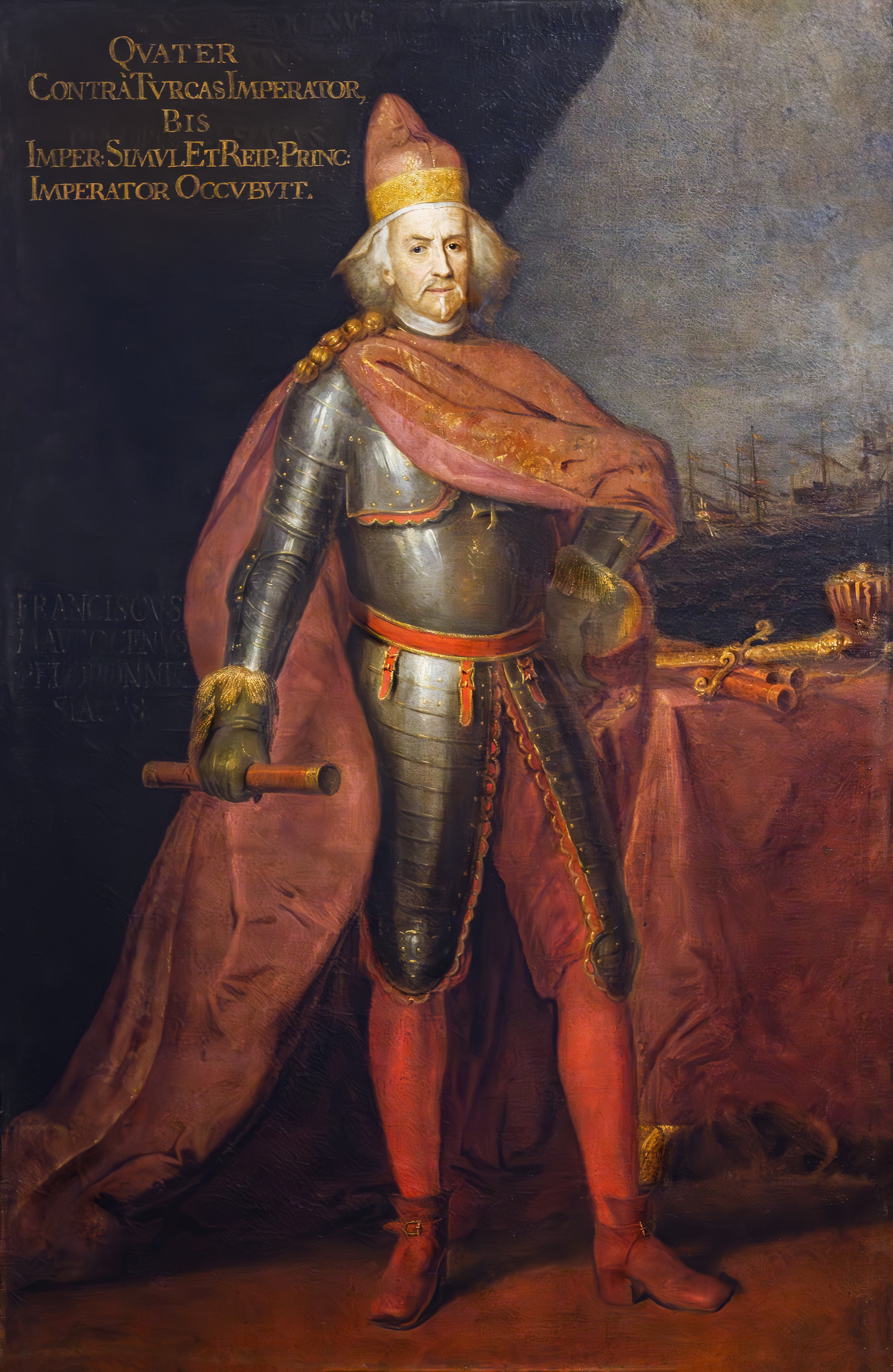
- Bartolomeo Nazari, Portrait of Francesco Morosini, c. 1750, Venice, Museo Correr

Doge of Venice
- In office 1688–1694
- Preceded by: Marcantonio Giustinian
- Succeeded by: Silvestro Valier

Personal details
- Born: 26 February 1619 Venice, Republic of Venice
- Died: 6 January 1694 (aged 74) Nauplia, Republic of Venice
- Resting place: Santo Stefano, Venice

Military service
- Allegiance: Republic of Venice
- Branch/service: Venetian navy
- Years of service: 1638–1694
- Rank: Captain General of the Sea
- Battles/wars: See list: Wars of Castro; Cretan War (1645–1669); Siege of Candia; Siege of Chania (1660); Morean War; Siege of Santa Maura (1684); Conquest of Coron (1685); Siege of the Acropolis (1687); Siege of Negroponte (1688)

Francesco Morosini (26 February 1619 – 16 January 1694) was the Doge of Venice from 1688 to 1694, at the height of the Great Turkish War. His tenacious defense of Crete in 1667–1669 earned him a reputation as a war hero, and his subsequent victories over the Ottomans secured Venetian dominion over the Peloponnese for three decades. Military historian Eric G. L. Pinzelli describes him as "the undisputed master of amphibious warfare in the Eastern Mediterranean".

== Biography ==
=== Early life and career ===
Francesco Morosini was born in Venice on 26 February 1619 to Pietro and Maria Morosini. He belonged to prominent Venetian family which had given several doges and generals to the Republic. Although he received a classical education, he was far more interested in battles and strategy, enlisting in the Venetian army at a young age.

In August 1638, he participated in an expedition against the Bey of Tunis on board a galleass commanded by Pietro Badoer. On 10 June 1640, at the age of 21, he was appointed sopracomito (galley captain) in the Venetian navy. He distinguished himself in the fight against the Barbary corsairs in north-west Africa. In 1643, he took part in the War of Castro, engaging in incursions and bombardments around Cesenatico, Senigallia and Rimini.

On 1 October 1645, he was promoted to the position of Governatore di Galera Grossa, (commander of a large galley). On 7 July 1647, he became the Governatore dei condannati (head of the galley squadron manned by convicts and captives), and on 29 September, he was promoted to Captain of the Gulf.

=== The Siege of Candia ===
The outbreak of the Cretan War allowed Morosini to fulfil his ambitions and prove his abilities. Morosini distinguished himself in battle and succeeded Alvise Mocenigo as Captain-General of the Venetian forces in Crete in 1654. By that time, the island had almost been lost entirely and the capital, Candia (modern Heraklion), was under siege. Having previously commanded Candia’s land forces on two occasions (1646–1661 and 1667–1669), Morosini rallied his troops and was able to resist for twenty-three years.

During the siege, Morosini distinguished himself through his daring exploits. In 1647, he forced his way into the port of Chios, where 80 Ottoman galleys, five Algerian vessels and five merchant ships were moored. Morosini ordered the ships to be bombarded and sent a contingent ashore to destroy the defensive battery. In 1659, he attacked the port of Çeşme, setting fire to an entire fleet of light combat vessels.

Over 21 years of continuous blockades, relentless subterranean mine warfare, and heavy artillery bombardment, Candia was virtually reduced to a pile of rubble. Official Venetian military reports and historical records indicate that approximately 150,000-200,000 Ottoman soldiers and 30,000 Venetian and allied Christian defenders lost their lives trying to take and defend the city. On 6 September 1669, Morosini signed a peace treaty with the enemy and surrendered the city, unable to continue the resistance.

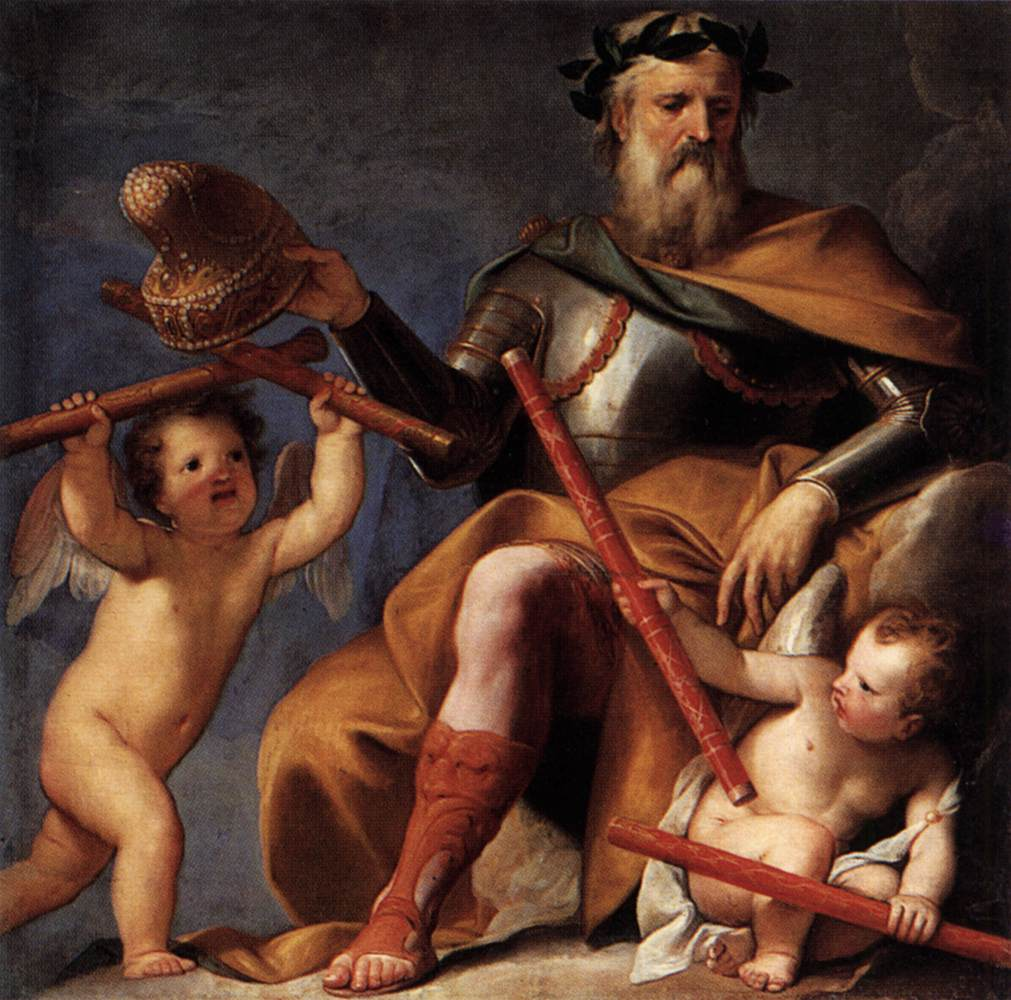
Gregorio Lazzarini, Merit Offers the Command to Doge Morosini, 1694, Venice, Doge's Palace

The capitulation was honourable for the defeated Venetians, who were permitted to remove their artillery and retain the fortresses of Souda, Spinalonga and Gramvousa (or Carabusa) on Crete. In return, the Ottomans returned Klis in Dalmatia. The Ottoman soldiers entered the city twelve days after the surrender and allowed anyone who wished to leave to do so freely. Because Morosini negotiated the terms of the peaceful surrender and evacuation entirely on his own initiative – without the prior authorization of the Venetian Senate – his political enemies, led by Antonio Barbaro, accused him of overstepping his authority and mishandling wartime assets. After an intense investigation led by an inquisitor, Morosini was completely exonerated of all charges. The Venetian authorities recognized that his tactical withdrawal had successfully salvaged what remained of the Venetian army, its administrative archives, and priceless religious artifacts.

=== The Morean War ===
Giuseppe Borsato, Morosini receives the command staff, 1838, Vienna, Kunsthistorisches Museum

Though weakened economically and militarily, the Republic refused to accept the 1669 treaty. When the Great Turkish War broke out in 1683, the Republic seized the opportunity to attack the Ottoman Empire and avenge the affronts it had suffered in Crete. Morosini was immediately appointed Captain General of the Sea and placed in command of the expedition. He led an army of between 10,000 and 15,000 men and a fleet of around 50 ships. Despite the relatively small size of his forces, he achieved several victories and threatened Ottoman bases in the Mediterranean. In 1684, he conquered the island of Lefkada, in the Ionian Sea. The next year he landed on the Peloponnese and, with the support of the local Greek population, swiftly advanced across the region. In 1685, he occupied Koroni and the Mani Peninsula; in 1686, he captured Pylos, Modon, Argos and Nafplio alongside his lieutenant, Otto Wilhelm Königsmarck, a Swedish military commander in the service of the Republic.

By 1687, Morosini had taken the entire Peloponnese, with the exception of the fortress of Monemvasia. The following year, with their control of the country practically complete, the Venetians established the Kingdom of the Morea and appointed Giacomo Corner as governor-general (provveditore generale) of the new province.

On 21 September 1687, the Venetian fleet dropped anchor at Piraeus (then known as Porto Leone), and a large force disembarked. Meanwhile, the mercenary contingents under Königsmarck's command landed at Elefsina. Faced with the massive Venetian force, the Ottomans quickly abandoned the main town of Athens and retreated up to the highly fortified Acropolis, which Morosini besieged. On 26 September 1687, a mortar shell partially destroyed the Parthenon, which the Ottomans were using as a gunpowder magazine. Severely damaged, the Ottoman garrison capitulated three days later. Morosini's army retained control of Athens for nearly six months. However, faced with a spreading plague, logistical difficulties and an approaching Ottoman army, the Venetians had to evacuate the city on 10 April 1688.

Morosini’s victories were widely celebrated across Europe. His fame reached such heights that he was given the victory title Peloponnesiacus by the Senate, and was the first Venetian citizen to have a bronze bust placed during his own lifetime in the Great Hall, with the inscription Francisco Morosini Peloponnesiaco, adhuc viventi, Senatus.

=== Doge ===
Giuseppe Lorenzo Gatteri and Francesco Zanotto, Triumphal return of Francesco Morosini from the battlefields of the Morean War, 1863

On 3 April 1688, Morosini was unanimously elected Doge on the first ballot. At the time of his election, Morosini was absent from the city, still fighting against the Ottomans in the Levant. The Senate sent the ducal seal and the corno ducale (the doge's crown) to him in Aegina on 26 May 1688, asking him to stay at his military post rather than immediately returning home.

On 13 July to 21 October 1688, Venetian and allied troops, numbering around 13,000 men, besieged the city of Negroponte (modern Chalkis, Euboea). Morosini's forces suffered disastrous losses due to an outbreak of plague. Four thousand besiegers, including Königsmarck, succumbed to the plague, and the attempt to conquer Euboea failed.

Morosini fell ill in December 1688 during the siege of the fortress of Monemvasia. He was unable to resume command until March 1689. In the meantime, he handed over command to Girolamo Corner, who occupied the city in 1690. In autumn 1689, Morosini requested permission to return home, having handed over command to Andrea Pisani.

Morosini arrived at Venice Lido on 11 January 1690. He boarded the ceremonial state barge, the Bucentaur, which escorted him toward the Doge's Palace. A massive flotilla of decorated boats, cannon fire salutes, and a specially erected triumphal arch welcomed him into the city. Upon reaching the center, Morosini formally relinquished his command baton as Captain General of the Sea.

=== The last mission ===
In 1692, a Venetian fleet comprising 34 galleons and 27 other vessels under Domenico Mocenigo attacked Crete and laid siege to its capital Candia, while at the same time the Greeks of the island rose up against the Ottomans. However, the attempt to retake Crete failed, and two thousand Cretans who had risen against the Turks were forced to leave their homeland with the departing Venetian fleet.

In the hope of reinvigorating the Venetian cause, the Senate re-elected Morosini as Captain General of the Sea on 25 November. The following year, on 26 May 1693, the Venetian fleet set sail under the command of the seventy-four-year-old Doge. Morosini captured the islands of Salamis, Spetses and Hydra, preventing the Ottomans from conquering Corinth. By then elderly, Morosini could not withstand the physical and mental strain of the military expedition. He fell ill and was taken to Nafplio, where he died on 6 January 1694. His remains were transported to Venice and buried in the Church of Santo Stefano.

== Commemoration ==
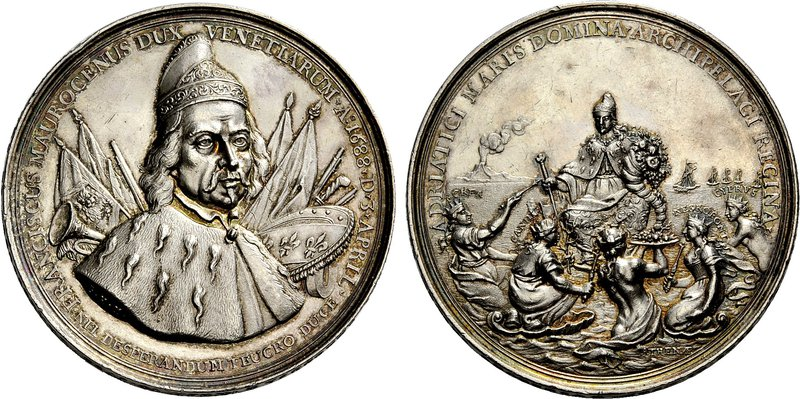
Medal struck in Morosini's honour for his military exploits in the Morean War.

- After his death, the Senate of Venice erected a triumphal arch in his honour in the Sala dello Scrutinio of the Doge's Palace. The arch was designed by the architect Antonio Gaspari, and the canvases decorating it are the work of Gregorio Lazzarini.
- The Scuola Navale Militare Francesco Morosini is named for him.
- The Ruggiero di Lauria-class ironclad Francesco Morosini, launched on 30 July 1885, completed in 1889, and stricken in 1909, was named for him.
- The Francesco Caracciolo-class battleship Francesco Morosini, laid down in 1915 but scrapped in 1921 prior to launching, was named for him.

== See also ==
- Morean War
- Kingdom of the Morea
- Parthenon
- Elgin Marbles

== Bibliography ==
- Chasiotis, Ioannis (1975). "Η κάμψη της Οθωμανικής δυνάμεως" [The decline of Ottoman power]. In Christopoulos, Georgios A. & Bastias, Ioannis K. (eds.). Ιστορία του Ελληνικού Έθνους [History of the Greek Nation] (in Greek). Vol. ΙΑ: Ο Ελληνισμός υπό ξένη κυριαρχία (περίοδος 1669 - 1821), Τουρκοκρατία - Λατινοκρατία [Hellenism under Foreign Rule (Period 1669 - 1821), Turkocracy – Latinocracy]. Athens: Ekdotiki Athinon. ISBN 978-960-213-100-8.
- Topping, Peter (1976). "Venice's Last Imperial Venture". Proceedings of the American Philosophical Society. 120 (3): 159–65. JSTOR 986555.
- Setton, Kenneth Meyer (1991). Venice, Austria, and the Turks in the Seventeenth Century. Philadelphia: The American Philosophical Society. ISBN 0-87169-192-2.
- Gullino, Giuseppe (2012). "MOROSINI, Francesco". Dizionario Biografico degli Italiani (in Italian). Vol. 77: Morlini–Natolini. Rome: Istituto dell'Enciclopedia Italiana. ISBN 978-88-12-00032-6.
- Dalègre, Joëlle (2019). Venise en Crète: Civitas venetiarum apud Levantem (in French). Paris: Presses de l’Inalco. ISBN 978-2858313020.
- Pinzelli, Eric G. L. (2022). Masters of Warfare: Fifty Underrated Military Commanders from Classical Antiquity to the Cold War. Yorkshire: Pen and Sword Military. pp. 167–174. ISBN 978-1399070157.

Political offices
Preceded by Marcantonio Giustinian	Doge of Venice; 1688–1694	Succeeded by Silvestro Valiero
