= Siege of Santa Maura (1684) =

1684 siege between the forces of the Republic of Venice and the Ottoman Empire

- Part of the Sixth Ottoman–Venetian War and the War of the Holy League
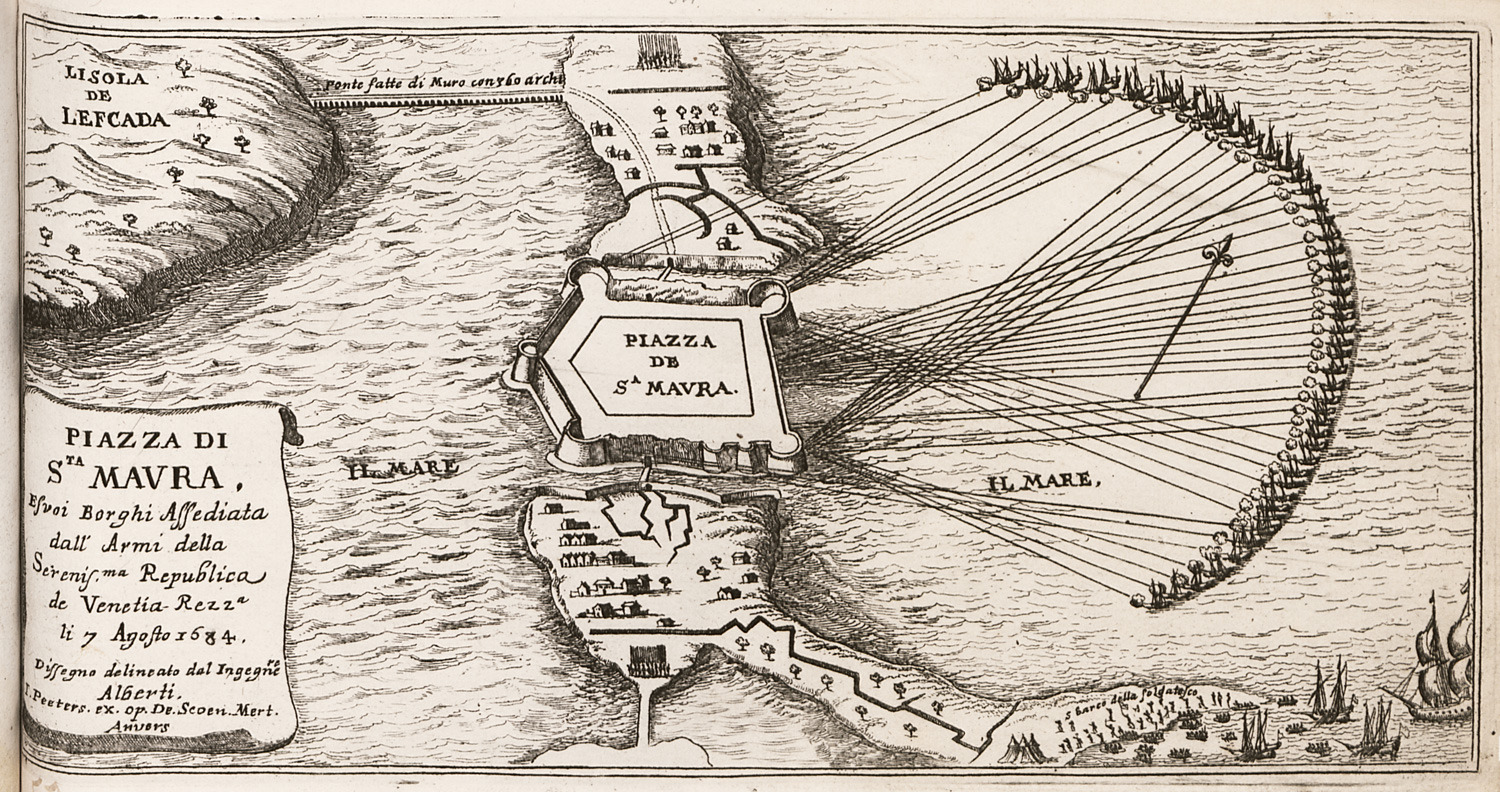
- Engraving of the castle's bombardment by the Venetian fleet (Jacob Peeters, 1686)
Date	July 21 – August 6, 1684
Location	Lefkada, Ottoman Empire 38.717778°N 20.643889°E
Result	Venetian victory

Belligerents
Republic of Venice	Ottoman Empire

Commanders and leaders
Francesco Morosini	Bekir Agha

Strength
38 galleys 8 galleasses 22 sailing ships	700 men

Casualties and losses
127 dead 128 wounded 1,750 sick	Unknown

The siege of Santa Maura took place on 21 July – 6 August 1684 between the forces of the Republic of Venice and the Ottoman Empire, and was the opening battle of the Sixth Ottoman–Venetian War. From his base at Corfu the Venetian commander-in-chief, Francesco Morosini, led a fleet of 38 galleys, 8 galleasses and several auxiliary vessels to besiege the Fortress of Santa Maura on the island of Lefkada (also known as Santa Maura), that was under Ottoman rule. The besieging forces were swelled by Greek levies and volunteers from the Ionian Islands. The siege lasted until 6 August, when the commander Bekir Agha, bowing to pressure from the 500 Albanians and 200 Greeks in the fortress garrison, surrendered to the Venetians.

== Background ==
The island of Lefkada, located close to the mainland coast of Epirus, was originally accorded to the Republic of Venice in the treaty of partition of the Byzantine Empire in 1204, but this never materialized, as the island became part of the Despotate of Epirus, and later of the county palatine of Cephalonia and Zakynthos. From the late 13th century on, the island and its principal fortified settlement were known by the name Santa Maura (Αγία Μαύρα). Lefkada fell under the domination of the Ottoman Empire in 1479, in the immediate aftermath of the First Ottoman–Venetian War, when the Ottoman admiral Gedik Ahmed Pasha captured the last possessions of the Tocco family, which along with the county palatine had ruled much of Epirus. The Venetians briefly occupied the island in 1502–03, during the Second Ottoman–Venetian War, but returned it to the Ottomans in the final peace settlement. In the aftermath of the Ottoman defeat at the Battle of Lepanto, the castle was unsuccessfully besieged by the forces of the Holy League. As a result, it was completely rebuilt and enlarged by the Kapudan Pasha Kılıç Ali Pasha in 1572–1574. The new fortress was in the shape of an irregular hexagon, some 220 metres (720 ft) to 150 metres (490 ft) at its widest, and featured nine large round cannon bastions. The original medieval fortress was retained as a citadel on the northeastern corner of the fortress.

Upon the outbreak of the Morean War in 1684, the Venetians held the initiative, as the Ottomans were preoccupied against the Habsburg forces in Central Europe and their fleet was in a poor state, but the Venetians also did not have a clear strategy, with the Venetian government leaving the choice to its commander-in-chief, the Captain General of the Sea, Francesco Morosini, and his war council. Lefkada became the first target of the Venetian fleet by accident: Morosini's main political rival, Girolamo Cornaro, had been appointed as Provveditore Generale da Mar, and tried to pre-empt the arrival of Morosini and his expeditionary fleet at Corfu with a spectacular feat of his own. Encouraged by letters from the local Greek population, he intended to seize the castle of Santa Maura, which he believed to be lightly defended. With a small force he sailed from Corfu to the island, but finding the fortress strongly garrisoned, he turned back without attempting a landing. As a result of this misadventure, Cornaro was sidelined for the first year of the war, during which he served as governor of the Ionian Islands, before he was appointed to command in Dalmatia in late 1685.

== Siege ==
Despite Cornaro's failure, Morosini and his war council decided to repeat the attempt, given that the season was already too advanced for anything more ambitious, and that at least use of Lefkada would be thus denied to the Barbary corsairs allied with the Ottomans. The fleet, comprising 38 galleys, six galleasses, and 22 sailing men-of-war, departed Corfu on 18 July, arriving at Lefkada two days later and disembarking troops on the mainland across from the fortress. Located on a long and narrow spit projecting towards the nearby mainland, and protected to the south by marshes, the fortress was separated from the mainland and the island itself by a wide moat, and accessible only over wooden bridges leading to the western and eastern gates. There was also a 3 kilometres (1.9 mi) long aqueduct that brought water from island's interior to the town that grew up in and around the fortress, built in 1564.

As a result of its location, an assault on the fortress had thus to be carried out from both the mainland (eastern) and island (western) sides simultaneously. Accordingly, Morosini divided his forces: on the mainland he deployed the Maron, Mirabaldo, and Bianchi regiments, along with the Maltese and Papal allies and the Albanian auxiliaries, and on the island the Gabrielu, Catti, and Tasson regiments, along with the Tuscan troops and the Croat auxiliaries. On the 21st, the Greek pirate Stathis Manetas arrived with 150 of his men, as well as Colonel Giovanni-Battista Metaxa with 2,000 Greeks from the Venetian-ruled Ionian Islands. On the same day, the Ottoman garrison commander, Bekir Agha, rejected terms for surrender. Morosini ordered the fleet to bombard the fortress, but contrary winds made this difficult. One galley was almost sunk and several others were damaged. From the land side, only a small number of guns and siege mortars had been landed, which also faced difficulties on account of the marshy terrain. However, the small size of the fortress, and the fact that the intramural settlement was largely made of wood, made the effect of the bombardment devastating, assisted during the night by Manetas and his men, who threw flaming brands over the walls. A bastion of the fortress was heavily damaged on the 27th, and collapsed on the 31st. By this time, the garrison was also running out of munitions.

In the meantime, Morosini was concerned about news of a relief action from the Ottoman garrison at Preveza. As a result, on 2 August, the fleet conducted a demonstration and bombarded the Castle of Bouka, while Manetas with 500 of his men was sent to raid its environs. On 6 August, the Venetians launched their main attack on the breach opened in the wall, but were repulsed, leaving 40 dead and many wounded. Nevertheless, in the same evening the garrison offered to surrender, on guarantee of safe passage for themselves and their families. The garrison and its civilian adherents, some 700 and 3,000, respectively, left the fortress on the next day, leaving behind 126 pieces of artillery. Some 137 Christian slaves were set free, but Morosini obliged them to serve a year in the Venetian fleet or army in exchange. Of the 42 Black slaves, some men were also sent to the galleys, while the others were distributed among the officers. The conquest of Santa Maura cost the Venetians 127 dead and 128 wounded, while an even greater toll was exacted by disease: 1,740 soldiers had to be sent back to Corfu for treatment.

== Aftermath ==
After the surrender of the Ottoman garrison, the crews of the fleet to repair the fortifications and erase the siege lines. A garrison of a thousand men from the Saxon and Corsican regiments was quartered in the fortress, and Lorenzo Venier and Filippo Paruta named governors of the island. The intramural settlement was evacuated and demolished, along with the two suburbs directly outside the walls, turning them into the castle's glacis. The island's capital moved to the remaining suburb, at the site of the modern city of Lefkada. Morosini and his war council prevaricated as to their next steps, launching raids into Acarnania and the Gulf of Patras, but in the end the decision was made to seize Preveza, in order to secure Santa Maura. After a brief siege, the Ottoman garrison there surrendered on the same terms as Santa Maura.

The Venetians modernized the castle over the next years, removing the remains of the medieval citadel, strengthening the ramparts and adding outworks. During the Seventh Ottoman–Venetian War, following the rapid Ottoman reconquest of the Morea in 1715, the Venetians initially abandoned Lefkada to focus their resources on the defence of Corfu. The castle was abandoned and partly demolished, but after the Siege of Corfu ended in a Venetian victory, the island was reoccupied and the fortifications restored. After that, the island followed the fate of the other Ionian Islands. The fortress remained in use as a military installation until 1922.

== Sources ==
- Anderson, R. C. (1952). Naval Wars in the Levant 1559–1853. Princeton: Princeton University Press.
- Brooks, Allan (2013). Castles of Northwest Greece: From the Early Byzantine Period to the Eve of the First World War. Huddersfield: Aetos Press. ISBN 978-0-9575846-0-0.
- Chasiotis, Ioannis (1975). "Η κάμψη της Οθωμανικής δυνάμεως" [The decline of Ottoman power]. In Christopoulos, Georgios A. & Bastias, Ioannis K. (eds.). Ιστορία του Ελληνικού Έθνους [History of the Greek Nation] (in Greek). Vol. ΙΑ: Ο Ελληνισμός υπό ξένη κυριαρχία (περίοδος 1669 - 1821), Τουρκοκρατία - Λατινοκρατία [Hellenism under Foreign Rule (Period 1669 - 1821), Turkocracy – Latinocracy]. Athens: Ekdotiki Athinon. ISBN 978-960-213-100-8.
- Kiel, M. (1986). "Levkas". In Bosworth, C. E.; van Donzel, E.; Lewis, B. & Pellat, Ch. (eds.). The Encyclopaedia of Islam, Second Edition. Volume V: Khe–Mahi. Leiden: E. J. Brill. pp. 725–728. doi:10.1163/1573-3912_islam_SIM_4663. ISBN 978-90-04-07819-2.
- Paton, James Morton (1940). The Venetians in Athens, 1687–1688, from the Istoria of Cristoforo Ivanovich. Cambridge, Massachusetts: Harvard University Press.
- Pinzelli, Eric (2003). Venise et la Morée: du triomphe a la désillusion (1684–1718) (PhD thesis) (in French). Université de Provence.
- Setton, Kenneth Meyer (1991). Venice, Austria, and the Turks in the Seventeenth Century. Philadelphia: The American Philosophical Society. ISBN 0-87169-192-2.
- Soustal, Peter; Koder, Johannes (1981). Tabula Imperii Byzantini, Band 3: Nikopolis und Kephallēnia (in German). Vienna: Verlag der Österreichischen Akademie der Wissenschaften. ISBN 978-3-7001-0399-8.
