= Michele Foscarini =

Venetian historian

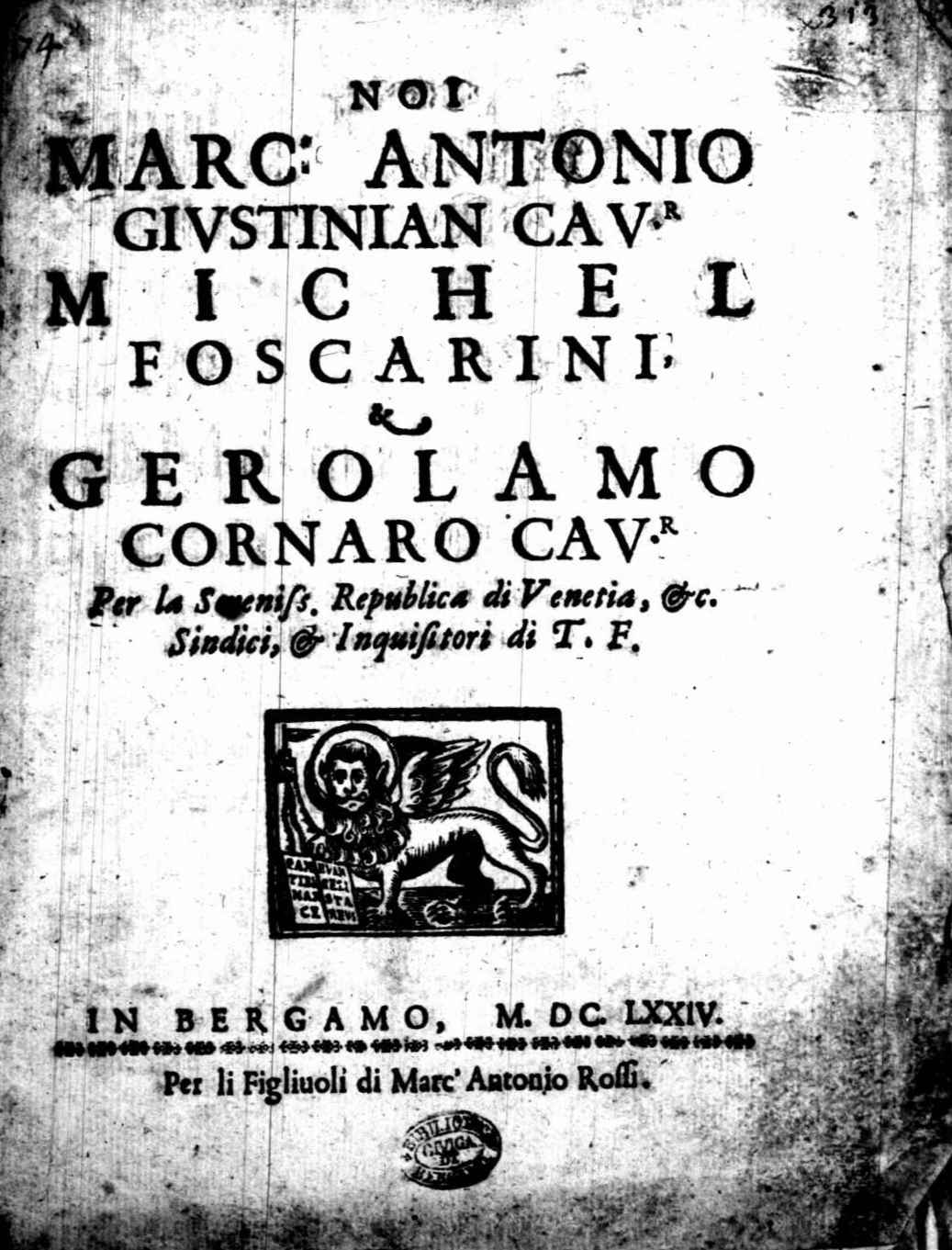
Marcantonio Giustinian, Michele Foscarini and Gerolamo Cornaro, Ordini relativi alle paghe delle genti d'arme, 1674

Michele Foscarini (1632 – 1692) was a Venetian historian. He is most notable for his continuation of the History of Venice by Giovan Battista Nani.
