= Siege of Chania (1660) =

- Part of the Cretan War (Fifth Ottoman–Venetian War)
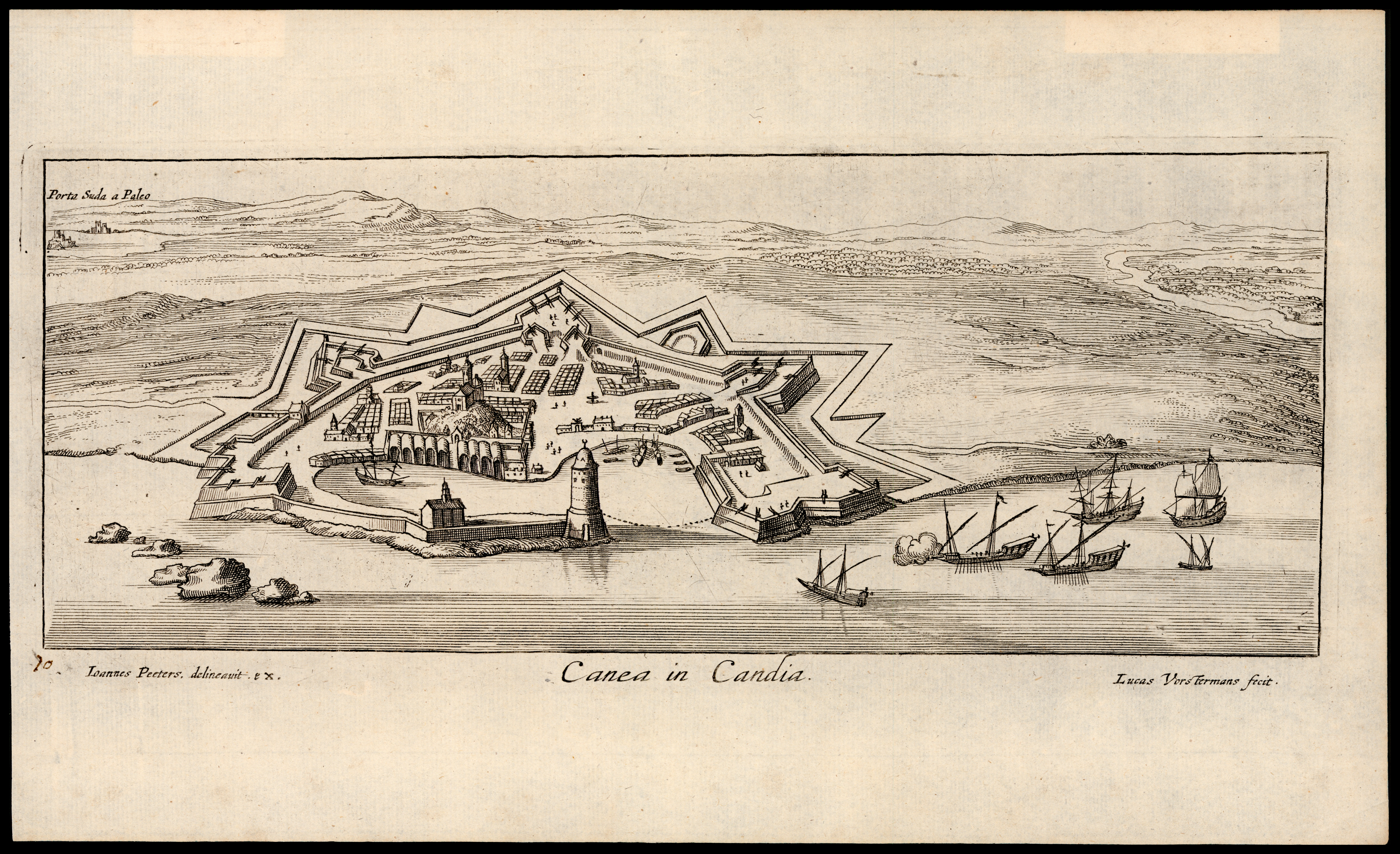
- Map of Chania, Ottoman drawing
Date	25 August – 15 September 1660
Location	Chania
Result	Ottoman victory

Belligerents
Ottoman Empire	Republic of Venice; France; Knights of Malta; Papal States; Duchy of Tuscany

Commanders and leaders
Unknown	Francesco Morosini; Almerigo d'Este; Chevalier Paul; Fabrizio Ruffo

Strength
Unknown; Reinforcements: 4,200 men	8,000 men 35 galleys 6 galleasses 35 ships 30 small crafts

Casualties and losses
Heavy	Heavy

The siege of Chania in 1660 was an attempt by the Christian forces to recapture the city from the Ottoman hold. The Ottoman managed to thwart the Christian attempt to capture the city.

== Background ==
In 1660, the Venetian general, Francesco Morosini, began his naval campaign by attacking Negroponte. The attack failed. Morosini then headed towards Kythira to meet the Allied forces in late April. On May 8, 7 Maltese galleys led by Fabrizio Ruffo. On June 28, The Venetians and Maltese were joined by 4 Papal and 3 Tuscan galleys. The next day, they were joined by a French fleet of 17 ships under Chevalier Paul consisting of 4,000 men. On August 2, the French commander, Almerigo d'Este, arrived. Disputes between the Christian commanders delayed the campaign but on the 22nd, they were able to sail for Crete with a total ships of 35 galleys, 6 galleasses, 35 ships, and 30 small crafts.

== Siege ==
On the 25th, the Christian forces arrived in Souda bay. The Christians entered the bay under heavy Ottoman artillery fire. The troops landed 8,000 men. The Christians led by Morosini and d'Este attacked the fort of S. Veneranda, and despite its capture, the Christians sustained heavy losses. The French then moved to besiege the city of Chania, while the Venetians assaulted the minor forts of Calogero, Calami, and Castello dell'Apricorno. The Ottomans at Candia learned of the attack and dispatched a force of 4,000 men during which the Christian forces were heavily pressing on Chania. However, only 3,000 were able to enter the city, had the Venetian forces acted more seriously, they could have prevented them from entering. Later on, the Ottomans were able to reinforce the castle with 1,200 men, despite Christian efforts to stop them. With Chania being reinforced, the Christians abandoned the attack and reembarked on 15 September.

== Sources ==
- Kenneth Meyer Setton (1991), Venice, Austria, and the Turks in the seventeenth century.
- Anderson, R.C (1952), Naval wars in the Levant, 1559–1853.
- Joseph von Hammer (1840), Histoire de l'Empire ottoman, Vol 11.
- Sir Paul Rycaut (1680), The History of the Turkish Empire: From the Year 1623 to the Year 1677; Containing the Reigns of the Three Last Emperours.
