= Sopracomito =

A sopracomito (plural sopracomiti) was the captain of a galley in the Venetian navy. (Note: The equivalent title for the captains of a heavy galeass, or later a sailing ship of the line was governatore.) Elected from among those among the Venetian patriciate who already had some naval experience, the sopracomito was an important position and stepping-stone in the naval cursus honorum of the Republic of Venice. It entailed considerable responsibilities for crewing and maintaining a galley as well as great expenses, which made it increasingly the province of the wealthier patricians.

== Eligibility and selection ==
Like all officers in the Venetian navy, sopracomiti were always members of the Venetian nobility; while the right to appoint some naval officers passed to the Venetian Senate in the 18th century, sopracomiti continued to be appointed by the Great Council of Venice. However, in the case of the galleys that were used as flagships by squadrons commanders (Capi di Mare), the commanders chose who would serve as captain of the galley (governatore or direttore). Galleys fitted out in the Stato da Màr, territories subject to Venetian control, were commanded by local noblemen, which often led to friction with the Venetian nobility.

Appointment to the rank of sopracomito required a minimum of four years' prior service as a nobile on a galley. To avoid nepotism, sons of sopracomiti were prohibited from serving on the same ship as their father. Apart from rare exceptions, no-one was appointed to the rank before the age of 20. (Note: For the Venetian navy's galleasses, the terms were even stricter: a nobile had to be 25 years old and have served as a provveditore in the Stato da Màr.) In turn, the rank of sopracomito served as a stepping-stone for higher commands; to be eligible for them, sopracomiti had to have actively served at least four years as the captain of a galley.

== Duties and responsibilities ==
The appointment typically lasted from 3 to 5 years. However, election as a sopracomito did not automatically mean command of a galley; years might pass before a sopracomito was appointed to command, allowing a galley from the Venetian Arsenal to be put at his disposal, and for money for hiring a crew made available. The responsibility of recruiting a crew was in the hands of the sopracomito, who with his paymaster set up a bench on the Molo in front of the Doges' Palace to attract crewmen (galeotti). In order to recruit a good crew, a sopracomito eager to distinguish himself often had to provide bonuses from his own pocket, hoping to be reimbursed by the government later.

Furthermore, while the government provided allotments of hardtack, all other expenses for feeding the crew and maintaining the ship had to be paid by the sopracomito, to be later—often with considerable delay, up to a few years—reimbursed by the government. A monthly stipend (sovenzion) (Note: This varied according to the period in question and the needs of the moment: from 300 ducats in 1466, it reached 2,500 ducats in 1581.) was provided by the government, but often this could only be claimed at the end of the campaign season, after the galley had returned to its home port to be demobilized. As a result, only the wealthier patricians could afford to become sopracomiti, and sometimes wealthy families were deliberately selected by the government for that purpose, (Note: Frederic C. Lane draws the analogy with the trierarchy in ancient Athens, which was one of the liturgies entrusted to the wealthier citizens.) although cases are known where sopracomiti tried to use the post for their own financial gain, by imposing loans on their crews and pocketing government money while claiming inflated expenses for their ship. Originally, selection for the post could not be refused by the candidate, particularly at wartime, but the exorbitant expenses made it an onerous duty that many tried to avoid. By 1686, refusal to serve was accepted against a fine of 500 Venetian ducats. In 1696, the penalty for refusal during wartime was sharpened further by deprivation of the right to sit in the Great Council for the duration of the conflict. Because the crew represented a considerable investment, captains were sometimes reluctant to risk them in battle; after the defeat at the Battle of the Oinousses Islands in 1695, a special commission considered that reluctance, as well as the scarcity of wages for crews, as the main reasons for the defeat. Because of this, the last centuries of the Republic increasingly saw the phenomenon of patricians (as well as foreigners) serving as "mercenaries" (venturieri) in various positions, including that of sopracomito.

When in active service, the sopracomito was obliged to always remain on board his ship, and was prohibited from bringing along his family or even having an accommodation on land. Likewise, severe restrictions were placed on the luxuries permitted a sopracomito, such as a ban on gilding, engravings, or silk furnishings on the ship. Nevertheless, the frequency with which the Venetian Senate issued instructions on the matter points to widespread violation of these regulations in practice. On the return, the sopracomito had to report to the board of the Provveditori all'Armar, officials responsible for the supply of the fleet, to account for the number of his crew, and claim the sovenzione due; if he failed to do this within fifteen days, he was barred from participating in the deliberations of the Great Council.

== Sources ==
- Lane, Frederic C. (1973). "Naval actions and fleet organization, 1499–1502". In Hale, John R. (ed.). Renaissance Venice. London: Faber & Faber. pp. 146–173.
- Lane, Frederic C. (1982). "Wages and Recruitment of Venetian Galeotti, 1470-1580". Studi Veneziani. VI: 15–43.
- Mocenigo, Mario Nani (1935). Storia della marina veneziana: da Lepanto alla caduta della Repubblica [History of the Venetian navy: from Lepanto to the fall of the Republic] (in Italian). Rome: Tipo lit. Ministero della Marina - Uff. Gabinetto.
