= Patras Lighthouse =

Lighthouse in Greece

Patras Lighthouse (replica)
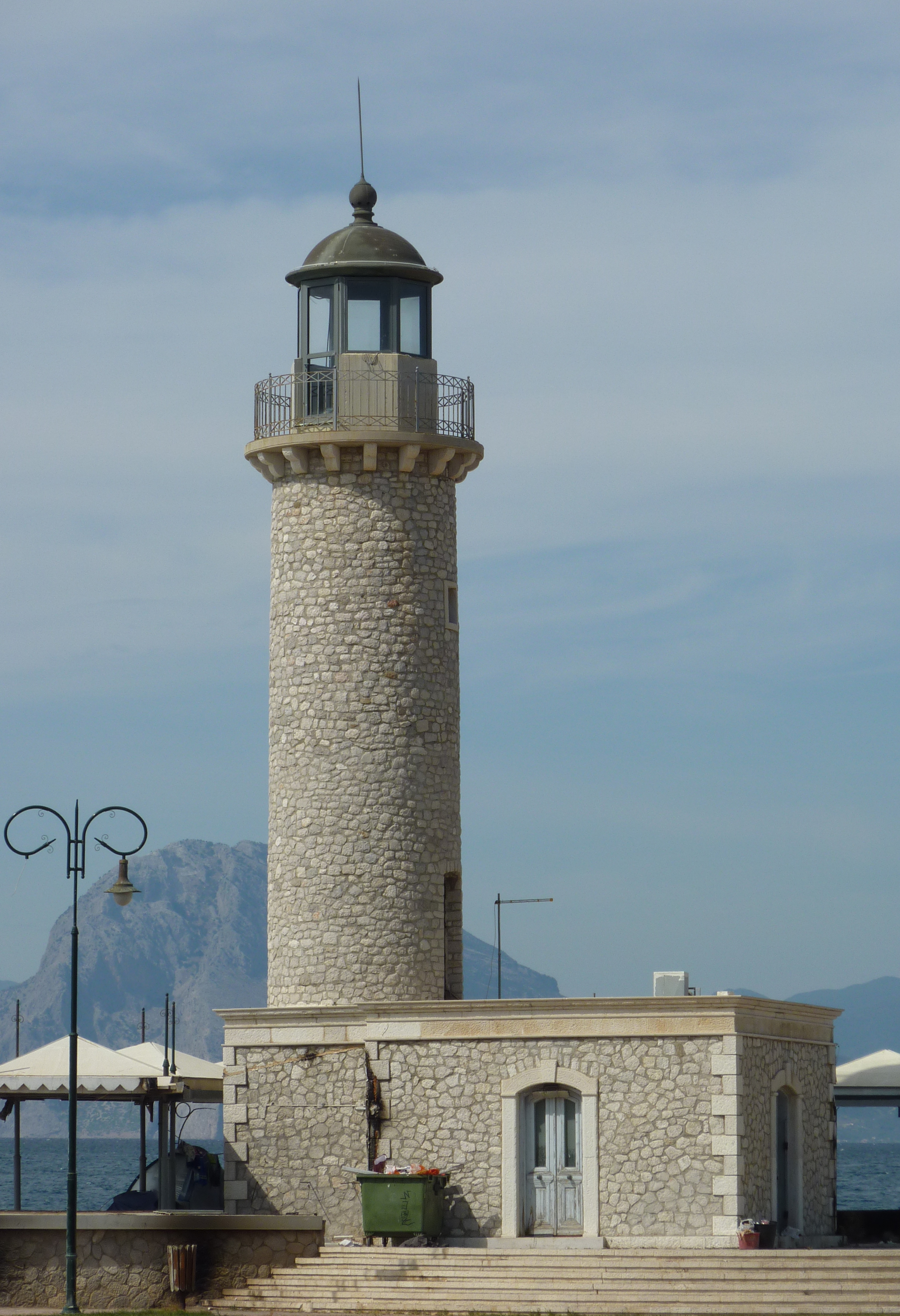
- Patras Lighthouse, 2010
- Location: Agios Andreas, Patras, Municipality of Patras, Greece
- Coordinates: 38.245078°N 21.725590°E

Tower
- Constructed: 1880 (original)
- Construction: stone tower
- Height: 13 metres (43 ft)
- Shape: cylindrical tower with balcony and lantern rising from 1-story keeper's house
- Markings: unpainted white stone tower

Light
- First lit: 1999 (replica)
- Deactivated: 1972 (original demolished)
- Characteristic: decorative light

Patras Lighthouse (Greek: Φάρος της Πάτρας) is a lighthouse and landmark of the Greek city of Patras. It is situated on the seafront (at the beginning of Trion Navarchon street), opposite the temple of Saint Andrew.

== History ==
The first wooden lighthouse of Patras was built in the dock of Agios Nikolaos in 1858 and was destroyed by a storm in 1865. The old stone lighthouse was built in 1878. It covered a surface of 4-5 square meters, while its height was 17 meters. It was demolished in 1972 in the period of the military junta during the port's modernization.

In 1999 the coastal zone council decided to rebuild the lighthouse in a southern location near Saint Andrew's cathedral. The reconstructed Patras lighthouse does not have a maritime usage but is one of the city's symbols and main sights. In the ground level there is a café – bar – restaurant, while in the surrounding area there is a seaside park, as well as free parking space.

== Gallery ==
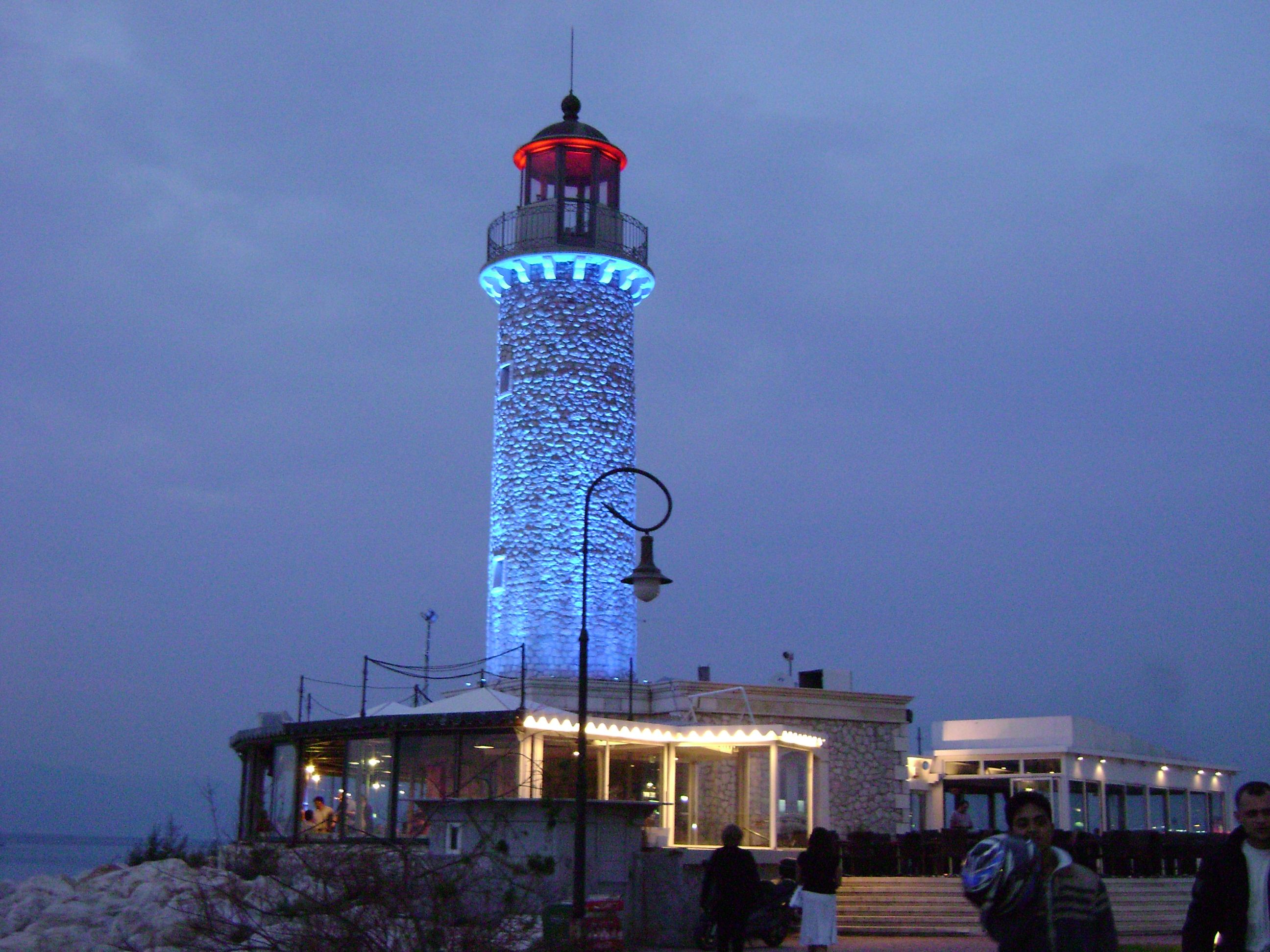
Lighthouse of Patras illuminated at night.

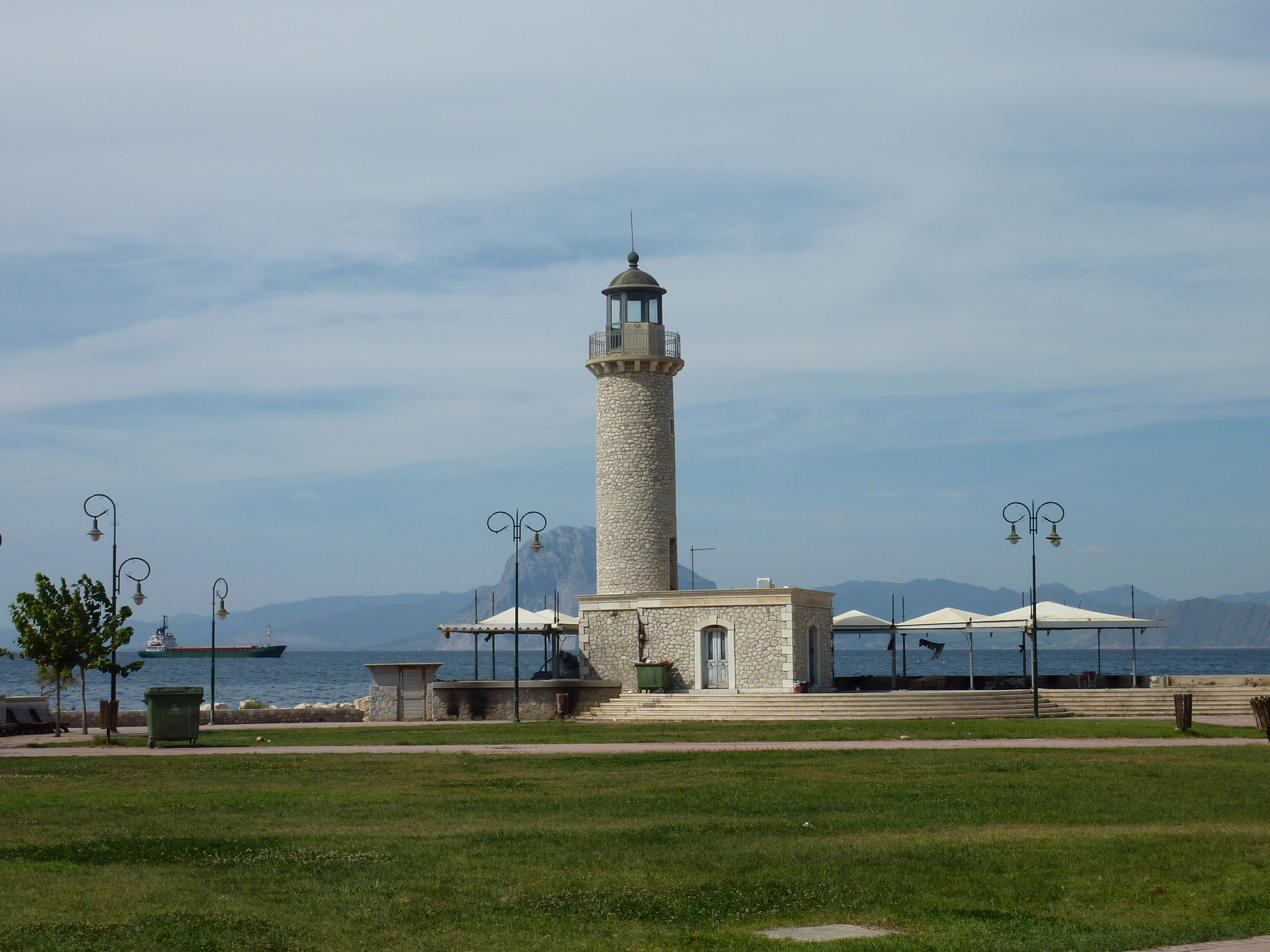
Patras Lighthouse.

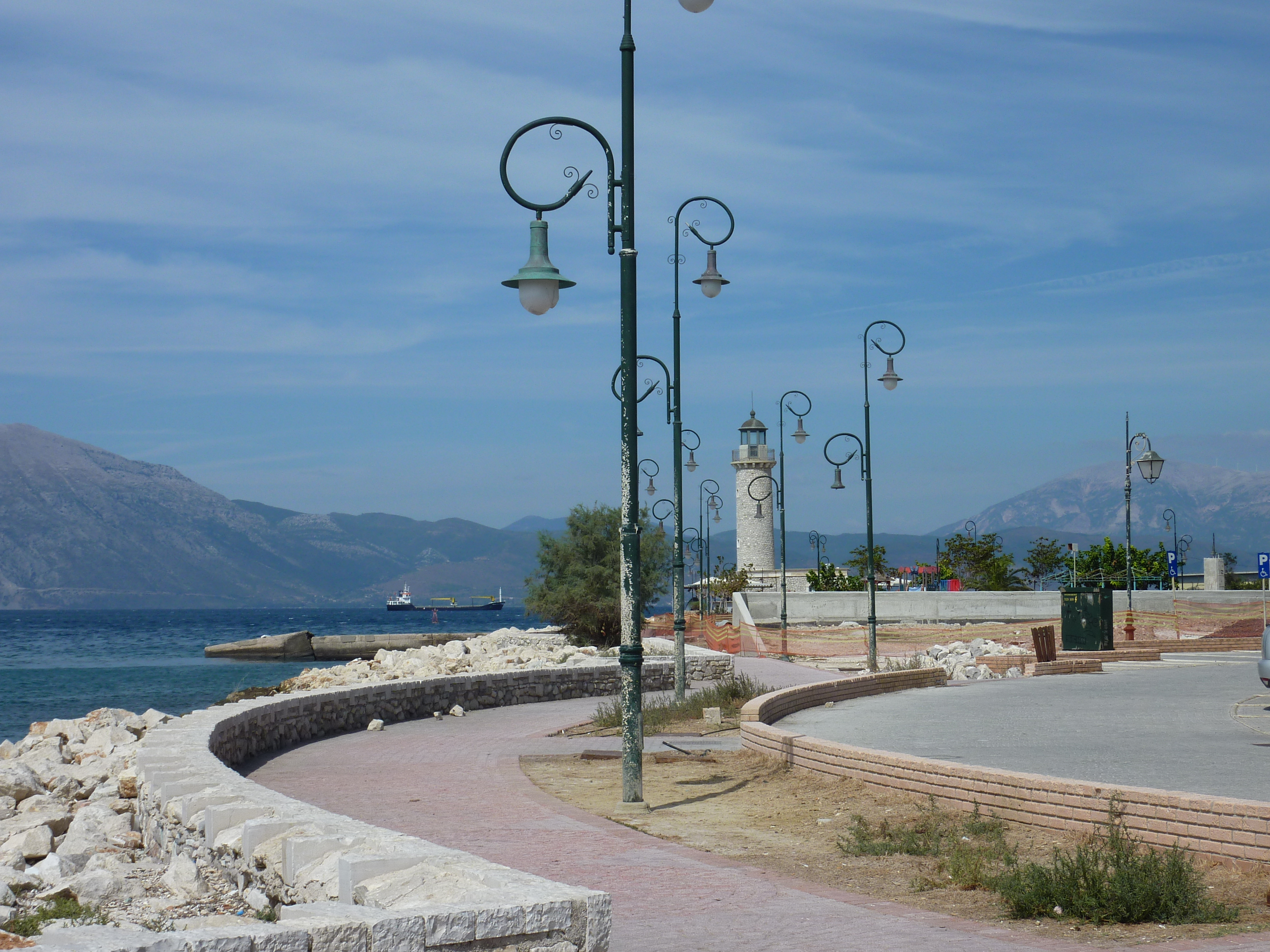
Patras Lighthouse park.

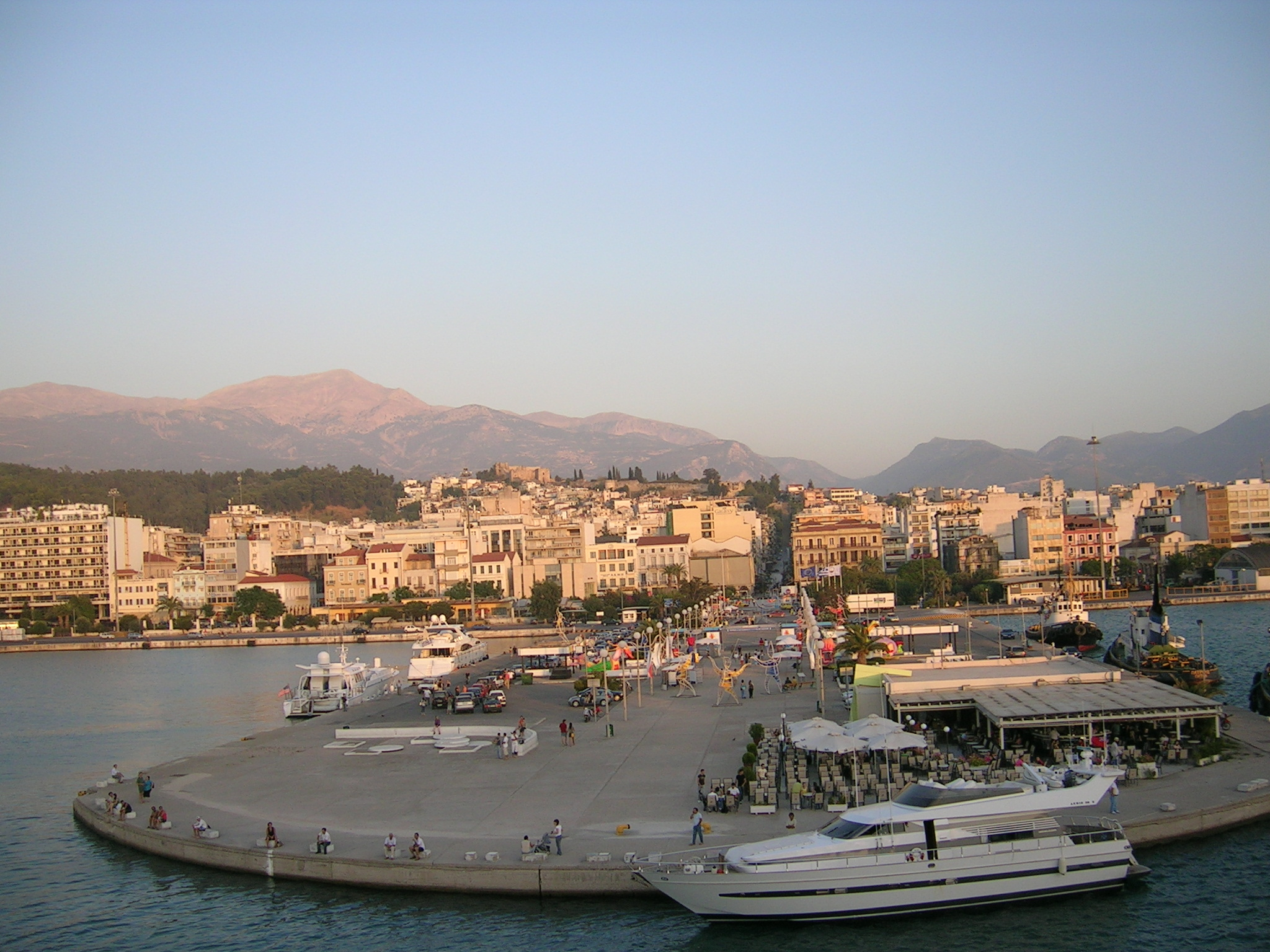
The original site of the lighthouse, Agios Nikolaos Pier.

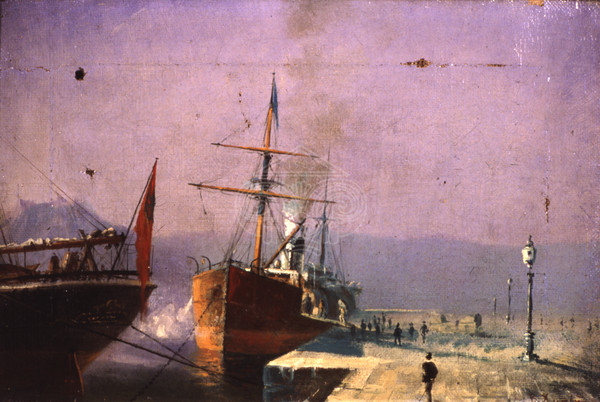
Agios Nikolaos Pier by Vasileios Hatzis.

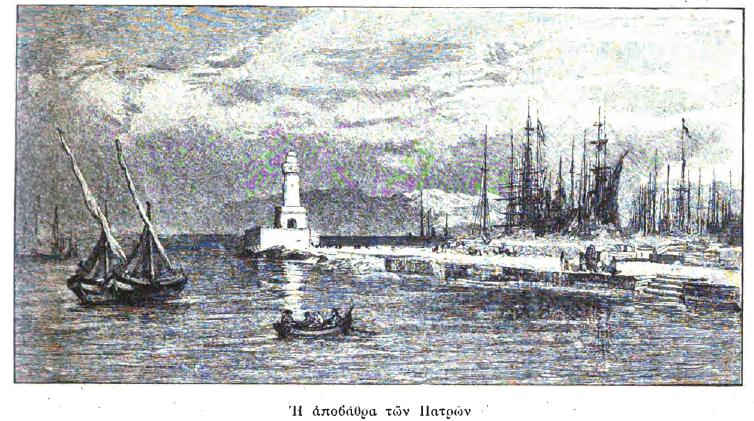
Agios Nikolaos Pier in 1876.

== See also ==
- List of lighthouses in Greece
- Saint Andrew of Patras
- Archaeological Museum of Patras
