= Nicolò Sagredo =

Doge of Venice from 1675 to 1676

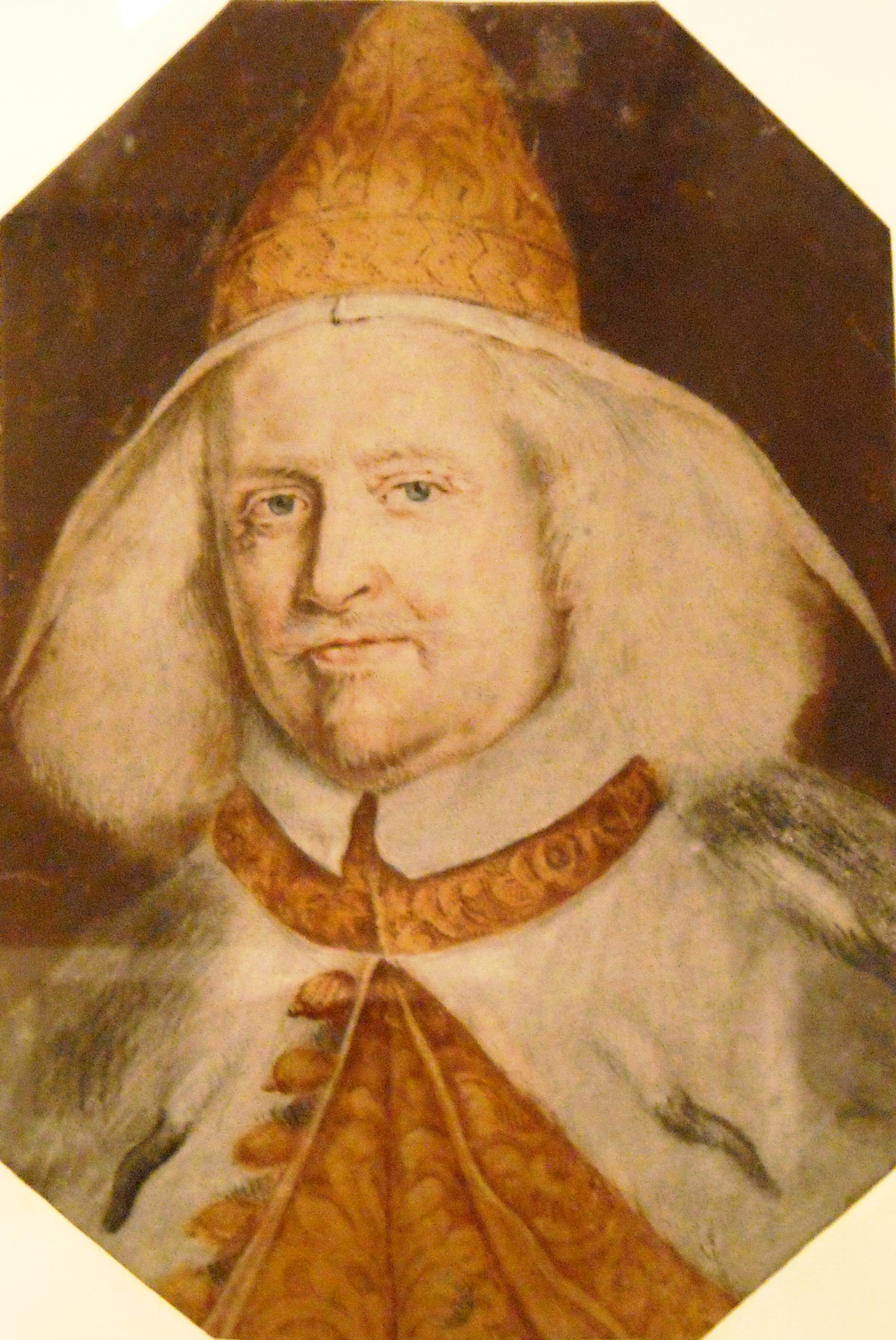

Doge of Venice
- In office 1675–1676
- Preceded by: Domenico II Contarini
- Succeeded by: Alvise Contarini

Personal details
- Born: 18 December 1606 Venice, Republic of Venice
- Died: 15 August 1676 (aged 69) Venice

Nicolò Sagredo (18 December 1606 – 15 August 1676) was the 105th Doge of Venice, reigning from 6 February 1675 until his death less than two years later. Little of note occurred during his reign as Venice was still recovering from the Cretan War (1645–1669), which had ended during the reign of his predecessor.

== Biography ==
He was born in Venice, the son of Zaccaria Sagredo and Paola Foscari. Nicolò's career was initially hampered by his father's reputation as a coward. In May 1630, at the Battle of Valeggio, a part of the War of the Mantuan Succession, the elder Sagredo had deserted in the midst of a battle that saw Venetian forces thoroughly trounced. His family disgraced, Nicolò was unable to embark on the life of politics he might otherwise have begun at this time.

The Sagredo family managed to redeem itself through providing Venice with several heroic deaths during the course of the Cretan War, and meanwhile the family had grown quite rich. Sagredo was able to parlay his wealth and new-found respect into a series of embassies on behalf of the Most Serene Republic, before eventually becoming a Procurator of St Mark's.

Doge Domenico II Contarini died on 26 January 1675. On 6 February 1675 Sagredo was easily elected as Doge. He celebrated his election as Doge with festivities and gifts. Such ceremony was the only notable characteristic of his reign as Doge: in 1675, he celebrated the traditional marriage of Venice with the sea with a level of pomp and ceremony that was long remembered by Venice for its splendor.

Sagredo died in Venice on 14 August 1676, after three days in a coma.

Political offices
Preceded by Domenico II Contarini	Doge of Venice; 1675–1676	Succeeded by Alvise Contarini
