= Siege of Knin (1688) =

Part of the Great Turkish War

- Part of Croatian-Slavonian-Dalmatian theater in Great Turkish War
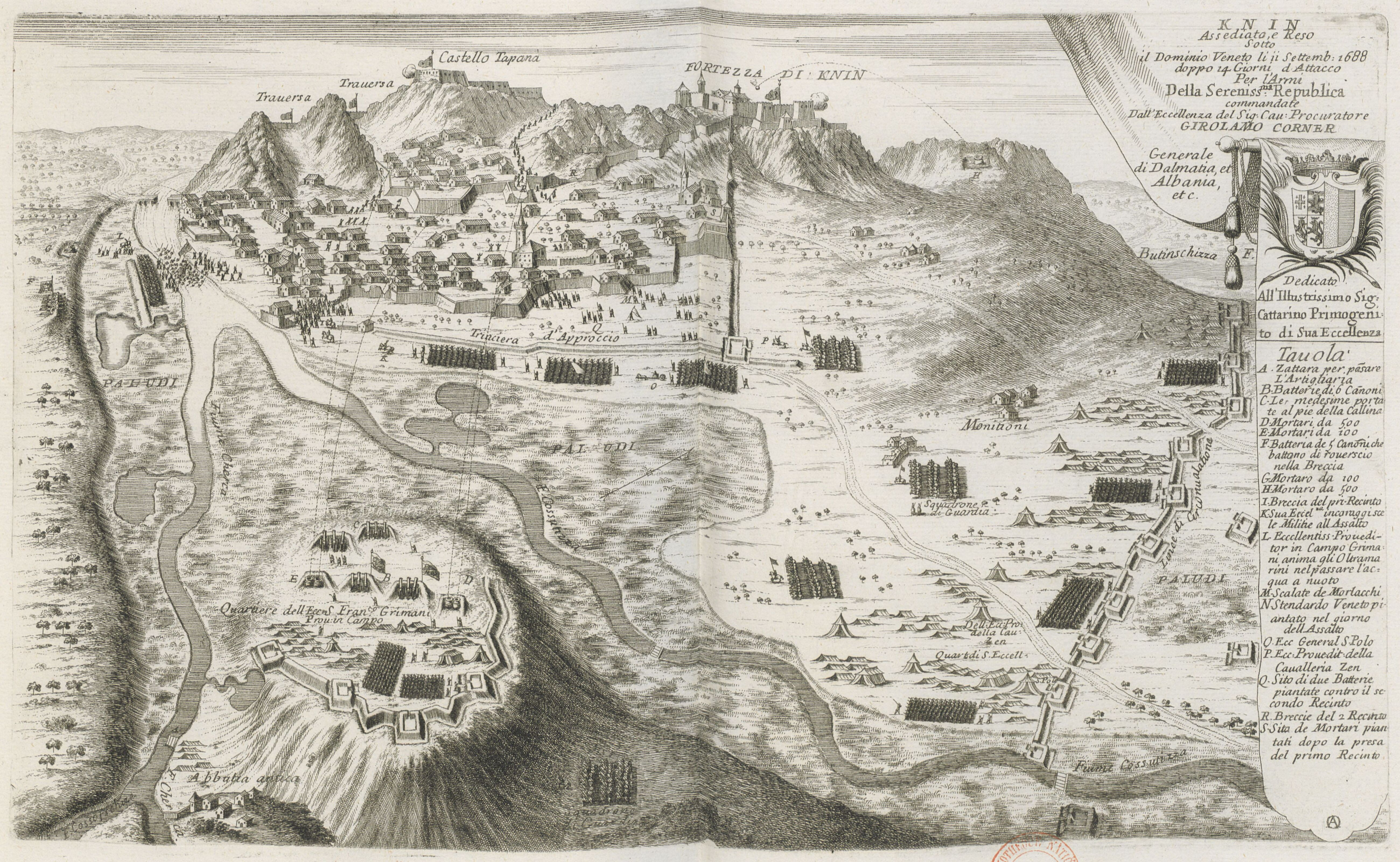
- Depiction of the siege
Date	August 29 – September 11, 1688
Location	Sanjak of Klis, modern day Croatia
Result	Venetian victory
Territorial changes	Venetian forces capture Knin

Belligerents
Republic of Venice	Ottoman Empire

Commanders and leaders
Girolamo Cornaro; Andrija Resnica	Mehmed-pasha Atlagić (surrendered); Mehmed-bey Atlagić (POW); Muhamed-bey Crnčić (POW); Ali-bey Firduzović (POW) dizdaragha Mahmud-bey (POW)

Units involved
Venetian army Local hajduks	

The siege of Knin was a siege undertaken in 1688 by the Venetian governor of Dalmatia, Girolamo Cornaro, and his local allies during the course of Great Turkish War in late August and early September 1688. The siege ended in Ottoman surrender and Venetian takeover of Knin.

== Background ==
In 1683, the twenty-year-long peace, concluded by the Vasvar peace treaty ended, and Ottoman Porte decided to renew its hostilities against the Habsburg Empire. The large Ottoman Army, attempted to capture Habsburg capital of Vienna in 1683, but suffered a crushing defeat, which also ended with the formation of anti-Ottoman alliance, The Holy League, and the beginning of the Great Turkish War. The Holy League brought together several European states such as Habsburg Monarchy, Russia, Polish–Lithuanian Commonwealth and Republic of Venice and united them against the Ottoman Empire.

By the year 1688, the Great Turkish War went on for almost five years. In June 1688, local hajduk leader Zaviša Janković conducted a raid on local Turks around Knin, killing 15 of them. He also stole their horses and burnt down their crops.

== Siege ==
On August 29, 1688, Dalmatian governor Giorlamo Cornaro gathered all available forces, and besieged the town of Knin. The well-aimed Venetian cannon fire damaged the town walls and caused casualties among Ottoman troops defending it. After losing all hope in successful defence of the town, beglerbey Mehmed-pasha decided to surrender town on 11 September 1688, to Venetians. His son Mehmed-bey and other prominent local Turks had also falen into captivity.

== Aftermath ==
After taking control of Knin, Cornaro had the most prominent Ottoman captives taken to Venice. He also loaded the remaining captives on Venetian ships and deported them eastwards, after he accused them of being "hardline plunderers".
