= Kastri Lighthouse =

Lighthouse in Othonoi, Greece

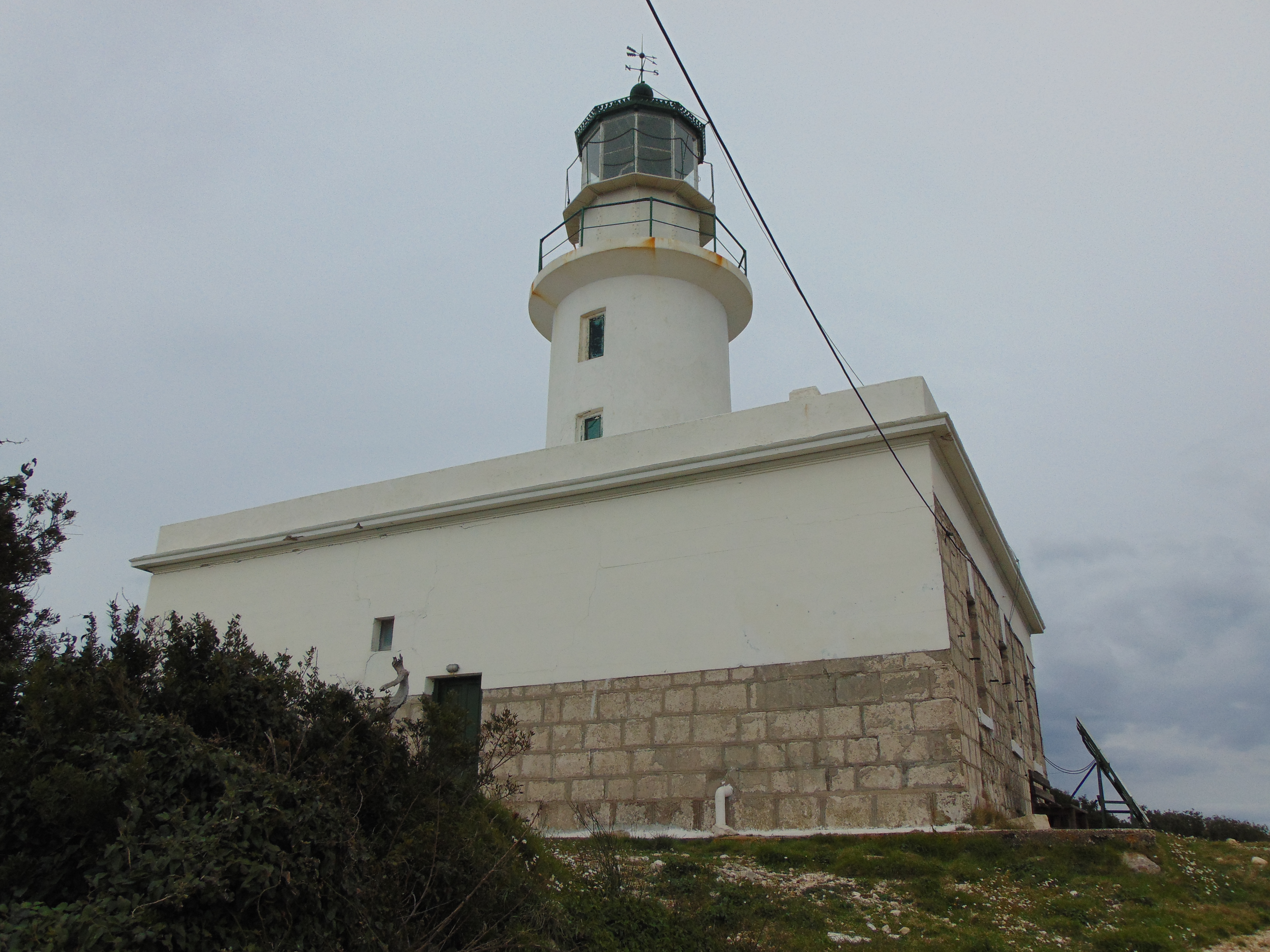
- Kastri Lighthouse, Othoni island
- Location: Othonoi, Greece
- Coordinates: 39.8649°N 19.4292°E

Tower
- Construction: white brick tower
- Height: 13 metres (43 ft)
- Shape: cylindrical tower with balcony and lantern
- Markings: white tower
- Operator: Hellenic Navy Hydrographic Service

Light
- First lit: 1872
- Focal height: 103 metres (338 ft)
- Light source: electricity
- Range: 18 nautical miles (33 km; 21 mi)
- Characteristic: Fl (1) W 10s.

The Kastri Lighthouse also known as the Lighthouse of Othonoi is an active 19th-century lighthouse which marks the approaches to Othonoi the most northerly island of the Ionian archipelago.

Established in 1872, the lighthouse was built on Cape Kastri, at the northeastern tip of the island. A road links the site to Ammos the main settlement on Othonoi.

The light, which has a characteristic of one flash of white light every ten seconds, is shown from a lantern room at the top of a 13-metre-high (43 ft) tower. The masonry tower stands above the seaward side of a single-story keeper's house. With a focal height of 103 m above sea level, the light can be seen for 18 nautical miles.

According to The Lighthouses of Greece: "It was damaged during World War II by bombs and looters and was unlit from 1941 until 1954. The kerosene beacon was then restored and served until 1985 when it was electrified."

Along with other Greek lighthouses, it is maintained and operated by the Hellenic Navy Hydrographic Service.

== See also ==
- List of lighthouses in Greece
