= Alvise Contarini =

Doge of Venice from 1676 to 1684

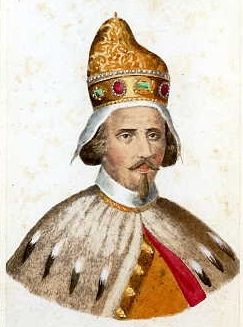
- Hand-tinted popular engraving, photographed by Carlo Ponti.

Doge of Venice
- Reign: 26 August 1676 – 15 January 1684
- Predecessor: Nicolò Sagredo
- Successor: Marcantonio Giustinian
- Born: 24 October 1601; Venice, Republic of Venice
- Died: 15 January 1684 (aged 82); Venice, Republic of Venice
- Burial: San Francesco della Vigna, Venice
- House: Contarini

Alvise Contarini (24 October 1601 – 15 January 1684) was the 106th Doge of Venice from his election on 26 August 1676 until his death in 1684. He was the eighth and final member of the House of Contarini to serve as Doge of Venice (with the first being Domenico I Contarini, who became Doge in 1043).

His reign was largely peaceful, as the Republic of Venice was still recovering from the defeat to the Ottoman Empire in the 1645–69 Cretan War. However, in the last days of Contarini's reign, hostilities with the Ottoman Empire were rekindled once again, and Venice soon entered the Sixth Ottoman-Venetian War, better known as the Morean War (1684–99).

== Biography ==
Contarini was born in Venice as the third son of Nicolò Contarini and Elena Michiel; he was a nephew of Francesco Contarini, the 95th Doge of Venice, who had a one-year reign from 1623 to 1624. Alvise Contarini never married, dedicating his whole life to public service. He served as Venice's ambassador to the Ottoman Empire, Kingdom of France, Spain, the Dutch Republic, and to the Papal court. The King of France granted Contarini the title of chevalier.

During his time as savio, Contarini supported the party in the Great Council that called for a continuation of the war with the Ottoman Empire.

Upon the death of Nicolò Sagredo on 14 August 1676, it seemed a foregone conclusion that he would be succeeded as Doge by his popular brother Giovanni Sagredo. Giovanni Sagredo quickly secured the votes of thirty of the forty electors. His opponents, however, believed he had used fraudulent means to do so, and they therefore rioted. Alarmed, the Great Council chose forty new electors, and when these electors met on 26 August 1676, they decided on Alvise Contarini as a compromise candidate.

Most of Contarini's reign as Doge was occupied with festivities and fun, and he made little attempt to exercise strong dogal powers. Contarini did, however, oversee a major judicial reform in the early part of his reign. Also, many new relics were brought in from Crete (now under Ottoman control) and installed in Venetian churches during Contarini's reign.

Several notable firsts occurred in Contarini's reign. On 25 June 1678, Venetian mathematician Elena Cornaro Piscopia became the first woman in the world to receive a Doctor of Philosophy degree, from the University of Padua. In a first of a very different sort, Venice's first coffeehouse opened in 1683, and drinking coffee soon became immensely popular.

In terms of foreign policy, these were anxious years for Venice. Venetians watched the progress of the Great Turkish War closely, as Venice's enemy, the Ottoman Empire, made territorial gains in the lands of the Habsburg monarchy (including all of the Balkans by 1682) before finally being halted by the forces of John III Sobieski at the Battle of Vienna on 12 September 1683. In Venice, debates about entering the war on the side of the Habsburgs dominated throughout 1683. Contarini died on 15 January 1684, shortly before Venice decided to enter the war in mid-1684, thus beginning the Morean War (1684–99).

Alvise Contarini was buried in the Contarini family chapel in the church of San Francesco della Vigna. There is a bust of Alvise Contarini on his tomb.

Political offices
| Preceded by Nicolò Sagredo | Doge of Venice; 1676–1684 | Succeeded by Marcantonio Giustinian |
