= Castle of Santa Maura =

Fortress on the Greek island of Lefkada

- Κάστρο της Αγίας Μαύρας
- Lefkada, Ionian Islands Region
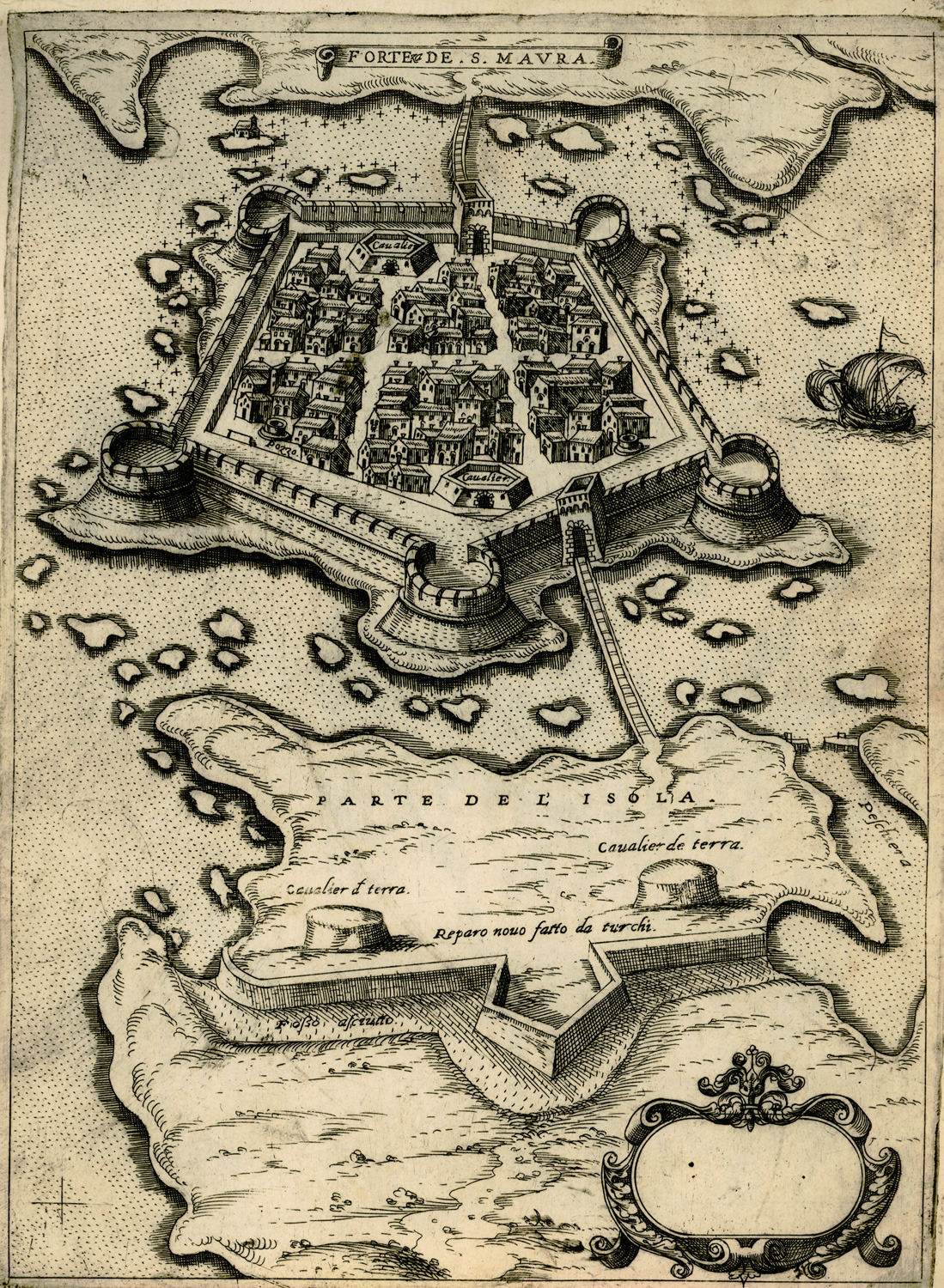
- Sketch of the fortress by the Italian cartographer Giovanni Camocio (1574), seen from the mainland approach

Site information
- Type: walled town, later fortress
- Controlled by: County palatine of Cephalonia and Zakynthos c. 1300–1331, 1360/62–1479; Walter VI of Brienne 1331–1360; Ottoman Empire 1479–1502, 1503–1684; Republic of Venice 1684–1797; French First Republic 1797–1799; Septinsular Republic 1800–1807; First French Empire 1807–1810; United Kingdom 1810–1864; Greece since 1864
- Open to the public: Yes
- Condition: Preserved

Location
- Location within Greece
- Coordinates: 38°50′40″N 20°43′13″E

Site history
- Built: c. 1300, rebuilt 1572–1574, c. 1713
- Built by: County palatine of Cephalonia and Zakynthos, Ottoman Empire, Republic of Venice
- Materials: hewn stone (ashlar)

The Castle of Santa Maura (Greek: Κάστρο της Αγίας Μαύρας) is a fortress on the northeastern tip of the Greek island of Lefkada. The castle began as a small fortification in c. 1300 to control access to the island, before it was expanded to become a walled town and the island's capital by the early 15th century. The Ottoman Empire took possession in 1479, and a century later rebuilt and enlarged it, giving it largely its present shape. A sizeable town grew outside the castle walls by the 1670s.

The fortress was captured by the Republic of Venice in 1684 after a brief siege. Under the Venetians, the castle was converted into a purely military installation; the walled town and the outskirts adjoining the walls were razed to improve its defences, and the capital moved onto the island itself, at the site of the present city of Lefkada. The fortress was modernized in the early 18th century, but was briefly abandoned by the overstretched Venetians in 1715–1716, during the Republic's last war with the Ottomans. The fortress, like the island, changed hands between France, the Russians, the Septinsular Republic, and the French again in 1797–1810, before being captured by the British, who controlled it until the cession of the Ionian Islands to Greece in 1864.

== History ==
=== Middle Ages ===
Located on a long and narrow spit projecting towards the nearby mainland coast of Epirus, the castle is strategically situated to guard the approaches to the island from the mainland. The first castle was probably erected at this location around 1300 by John I Orsini, the Count palatine of Cephalonia and Zakynthos, who received possession of Lefkada (then known as Santa Maura) in 1295 from his father-in-law, the Despot of Epirus Nikephoros I Komnenos Doukas. This first fortification was probably in the northeastern corner of the current castle. The Orsini family lost Lefkada in 1331 to Walter VI of Brienne, who in 1343 ceded the castrum Sancte Maure and the island to the Venetian Graziano Giorgio. In 1360/62, Leonardo I Tocco seized Lefkada, assuming the title of duke. Carlo I Tocco (r. 1376–1429) made the castle the capital of his domains, which apart from the County palatine of Cephalonia and Zakynthos also included much of the Epirote mainland, and enlarged the fortified town. Nevertheless, the settlement appears to have extended beyond the walls on both sides of the castle.

In 1413, the Prince of Achaea, Centurione II Zaccaria, launched an attack on Lefkada and its castle with Albanian mercenaries, but it was defeated with help from the Republic of Venice. The Ottomans raided the island in 1430, leading the Tocci to consider ceding it to the Venetians, but in the event the island remained under Tocco rule until captured by the Ottomans in 1479.

=== Ottoman period ===
The Venetians briefly occupied the island in 1502–03, during the Second Ottoman–Venetian War, but returned it to the Ottomans in the final peace settlement. Under Ottoman rule, the town inside the castle (known as Aya Mavra, ايامورة, from Greek Αγία Μαύρα) was the capital of the island. A register compiled in 1523–1536 mentions that the town comprised 194 households, i.e., around 1,000 inhabitants, all of them Greek Christians, and that the garrison numbered 111 soldiers and 9 artillerymen. A lack of water led to the construction of a 3 kilometres (1.9 mi) long aqueduct from the island's interior to the town in 1564. Bringing water to the walled town as well as to the much larger—some 700–800 houses—open town that had grown around it, this was of the most important works of Ottoman civil architecture in the western Balkans. On top of the aqueduct was a footpath that was the only access to the island, other than by the sea.

In the aftermath of the Ottoman defeat at the Battle of Lepanto, the castle was unsuccessfully besieged by the forces of the Holy League. As a result, it was completely rebuilt and enlarged by the Kapudan Pasha Kılıç Ali Pasha in 1572–1574. The new castle resembles the earlier Castle of the Morea at Rio. The new fortress was in the shape of an irregular hexagon, some 220 metres (720 ft) to 150 metres (490 ft) at its widest; and featured nine large round cannon bastions. The medieval fortress was retained as a citadel on the northeastern corner. By the time Evliya Çelebi visited the castle in 1670/71, only Muslims lived in its c. 200 stone houses, with the Christians in two adjoining suburbs to the east and west and one on the island itself. In contrast to the walled town, all buildings in the suburbs had purposely been built of wood. Evliya writes that the garrison comprised 1,085 men, but an Ottoman budget document from the same year lists just 285.

=== Venetian period ===
The castle was conquered by the Venetians following a sixteen-day siege in 1684, during the Morean War. The Venetian commander, Francesco Morosini, evacuated the walled town and demolished both it and the two suburbs directly outside the walls, turning them into the castle's glacis. The island's capital moved to the remaining suburb, at the site of the modern city of Lefkada. The Venetians modernized the castle by 1713, removing the remains of the medieval citadel; the eastern ramparts, facing the Ottoman-held mainland, were thickened and improved with the addition of two bastions, a ravelin and couvreface; and additional outworks were built on the flanks of the fortress.

During the Seventh Ottoman–Venetian War, following the rapid Ottoman reconquest of the Morea in 1715, the Venetians initially abandoned Lefkada to focus their resources on the defence of Corfu. The castle was abandoned and partly demolished, but after the Siege of Corfu ended in a Venetian victory, the island was reoccupied and the fortifications restored. After a rebellion of the local Greek populace in 1769, the fortifications were repaired.

=== Modern period ===
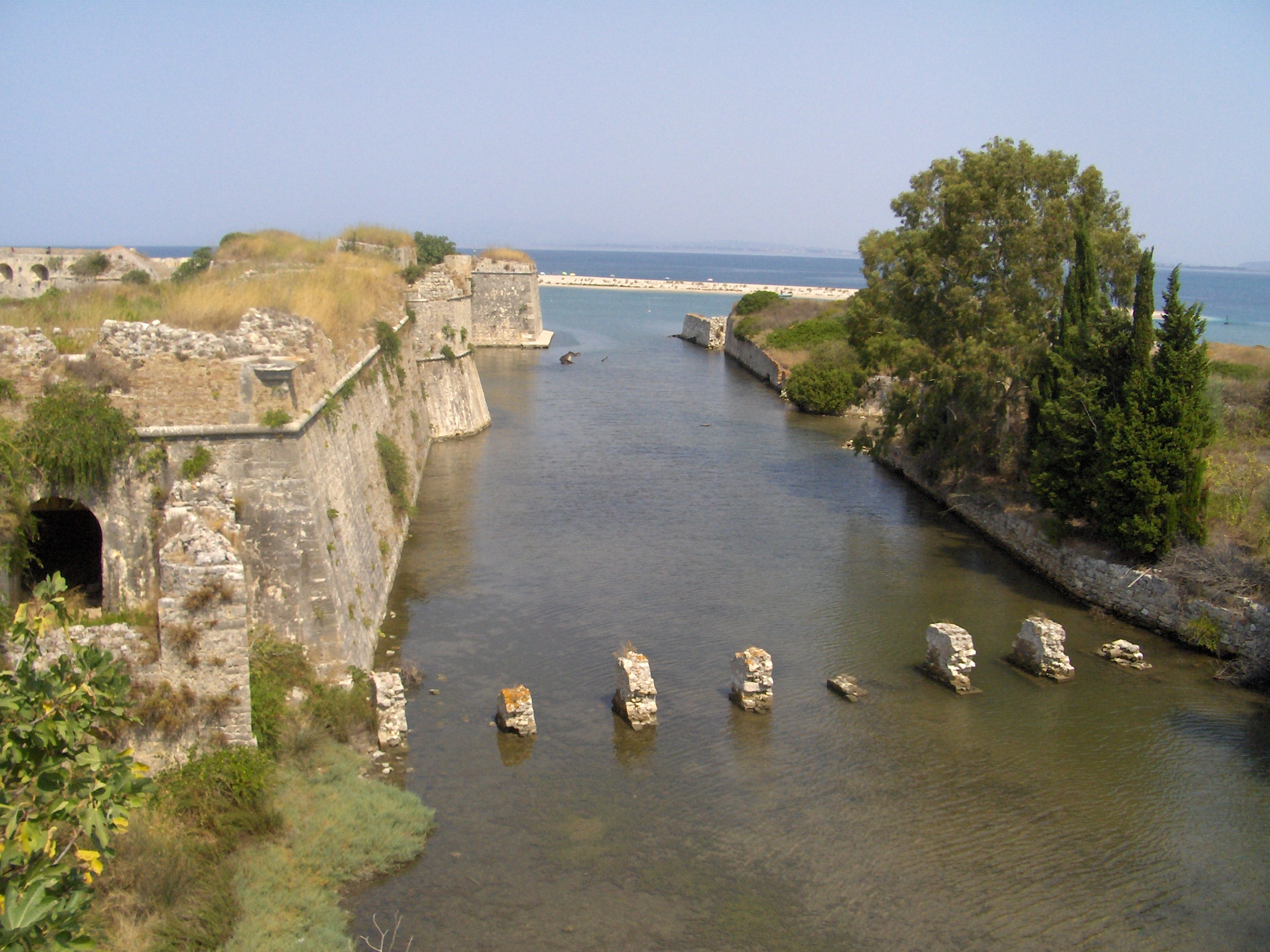
The eastern (mainland-oriented) moat of the castle today (2014), with the ruined piers of the wooden access bridge visible

Following the Fall of the Republic of Venice in 1797, Lefkada, like the other Venetian Ionian Islands, was occupied by the French, who held it until a Russo-Turkish expedition under Ushakov captured it in 1799. Ali Pasha of Ioannina, who coveted possession of the Ionian Islands, besieged Lefkada in 1807, but the local Russian and Greek forces of the Septinsular Republic successfully defended the fortress. French rule was restored in 1807, after the Treaty of Tilsit, but in 1810, the British captured the island.

During the subsequent period of the British protectorate, the castle was garrisoned by British troops, who undertook some modernization of its facilities. Following the Union of the Ionian Islands with Greece in 1864, the castle was garrisoned by the Greek army until 1922, when Asia Minor refugees were housed there. The fortress was eventually abandoned, and in 1938 most of the buildings with its walls were demolished.

== Sources ==
- Brooks, Allan (2013). Castles of Northwest Greece: From the Early Byzantine Period to the Eve of the First World War. Huddersfield: Aetos Press. ISBN 978-0-9575846-0-0.
- Kiel, M. (1986). "Levkas". In Bosworth, C. E.; van Donzel, E.; Lewis, B. & Pellat, Ch. (eds.). The Encyclopaedia of Islam, Second Edition. Volume V: Khe–Mahi. Leiden: E. J. Brill. pp. 725–728. doi:10.1163/1573-3912_islam_SIM_4663. ISBN 978-90-04-07819-2.
- Moschonas, Nikolaos (1975). "Τα Ιόνια Νησιά κατά την περίοδο 1797-1821" [The Ionian Islands in the period 1797-1821]. In Christopoulos, Georgios A. & Bastias, Ioannis K. (eds.). Ιστορία του Ελληνικού Έθνους [History of the Greek Nation] (in Greek). Vol. ΙΑ: Ο Ελληνισμός υπό ξένη κυριαρχία (περίοδος 1669 - 1821), Τουρκοκρατία - Λατινοκρατία [Hellenism under Foreign Rule (Period 1669 - 1821), Turkocracy – Latinocracy]. Athens: Ekdotiki Athinon. pp. 382–402. ISBN 978-960-213-100-8.
- Soustal, Peter; Koder, Johannes (1981). Tabula Imperii Byzantini, Band 3: Nikopolis und Kephallēnia (in German). Vienna: Verlag der Österreichischen Akademie der Wissenschaften. ISBN 978-3-7001-0399-8.
