= Provveditori all'Armar =

Venetian officials responsible for provisioning naval equipment

The Provveditori all'Armar (lit. 'superintendents on armament') were officials of the Republic of Venice responsible for the provisioning and equipment of the ships and crews of the Venetian navy.

== History ==
Up to the mid-16th century, naval matters were supervised by the five-member board of the Savi agli Ordini, but gradually a more complex and professional administration was built up.

As part of this process, already in 1497, two patricians were entrusted with supervising naval affairs, as the Provveditori ed esecutori alle cose marittime, whose number was raised to three in 1499. In 1545, two Provveditori all'Armar were established, raised in 1644 to three, to supervise the provisioning, equipment and clothing of the fleet and its crews. They had the right to appoint any officer other than patricians, and to try disputes between officers, sailors, and convict crewmen. As such, they formed part of the Venetian admiralty, the Collegio della Milizia da Mar, along with the Provveditori of the Venetian Arsenal and other officials.

The Provveditori all'Armar had to be kept abreast of the location and role of all naval personnel at all times, so that anyone required for a particular task might be mobilized at once. This lasted until the end of the 16th century. With the onset of a longer period of peace after that, the rolls of eligible personnel, supposed to be renewed every ten years, were neglected.

The Provveditori all'Armar were also responsible for supervising the outfitting and decommissioning of every warship in person, checking the presence of the assigned crews and material and the accounting books, and of handing over to the captains their written instructions. All senior naval commanders (Capi da Mare) had to file reports every two months to the Provveditori all'Armar on wages and other expenses, while the Provveditori themselves were obliged to perform monthly inspections. Galley captains (Sopracomiti) were obliged to report the number of their hired crewmen and the money owed to the Provveditori upon the decommissioning of their ship within 15 days.

== Sources ==
- Da Mosto, Andrea (1937). L'Archivio di Stato di Venezia. Indice Generale, Storico, Descrittivo ed Analitico. Tomo I: Archivi dell' Amministrazione Centrale della Repubblica Veneta e Archivi Notarili (in Italian). Rome: Biblioteca d'arte editrice. OCLC 772861816.
- Nani Mocenigo, Mario (1935). Storia della marina veneziana: da Lepanto alla caduta della Repubblica [History of the Venetian navy: from Lepanto to the fall of the Republic] (in Italian). Rome: Tipo lit. Ministero della Marina – Uff. Gabinetto.
