= Chania Lighthouse =

Venetian lighthouse in Chania, Greece

Chania Lighthouse Φάρος Χανίων
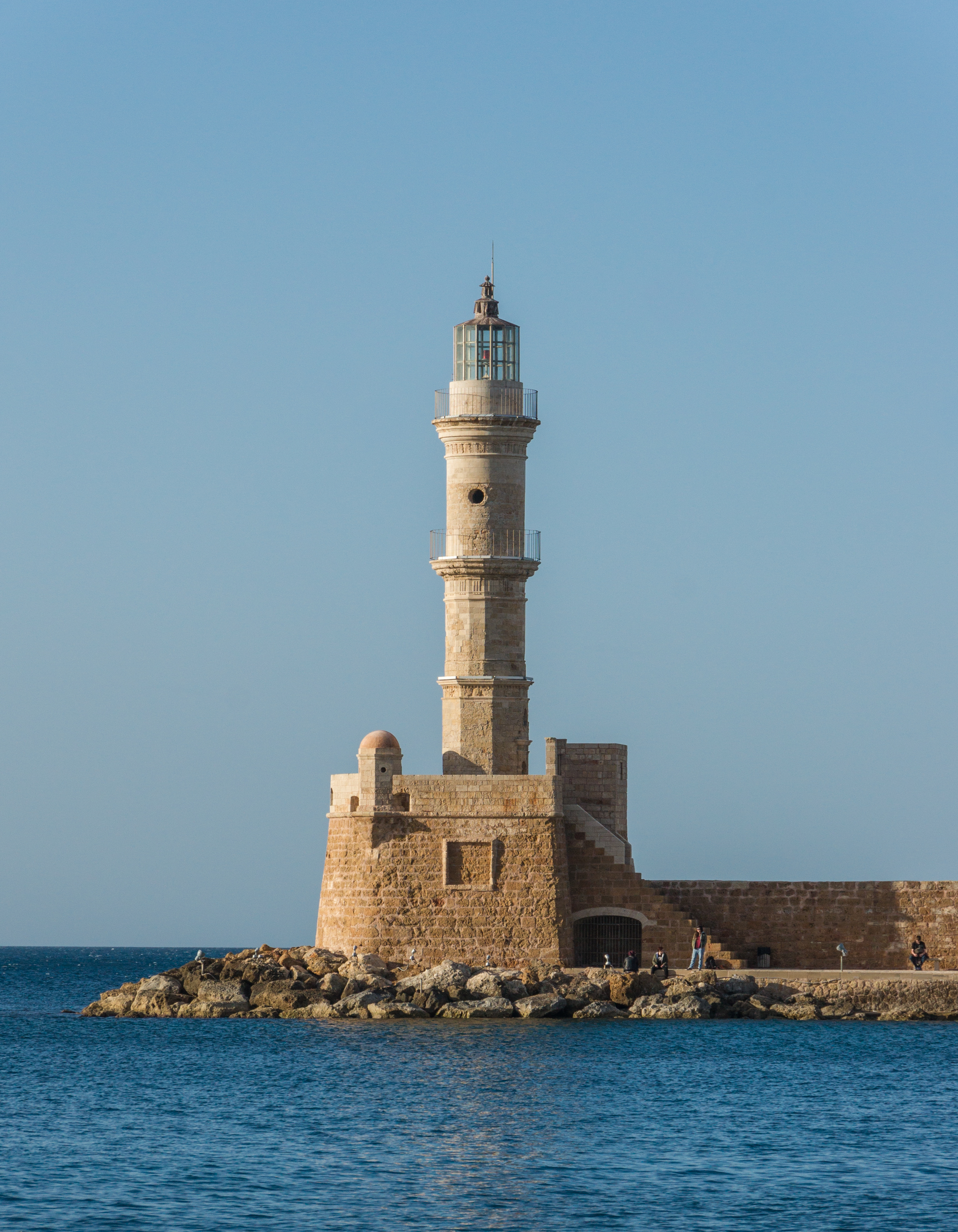
- Chania Lighthouse pictured in 2015
- Location: Chania Municipality, Greece
- Coordinates: 35°31′10″N 24°01′00″E

Tower
- Constructed: 1839
- Construction: stone (foundation)
- Height: 26 m (85 ft)
- Shape: cylinder
- Markings: unpainted (tower), white (lantern)
- Operator: Chania Municipality
- Heritage: archaeological site

Light
- Focal height: 26 m (85 ft)
- Range: 7 nmi (13 km; 8.1 mi)
- Characteristic: Fl R 2.5s

Chania Lighthouse (Greek: Φάρος Χανίων), is a lighthouse located at the entrance of the port of Chania, on the island of Crete, Greece. It was built in 1864 on the site of the original lighthouse by the Venetians. It has been a listed archeological site in Greece since 1962.

== History ==
Chania Lighthouse was originally a naval post created by the Venetians that would protect the city from oncoming Turks or pirates. In 1645, the Turks took control of the city, during which the lighthouse was left to ruins. Egyptian troops, who were aiding the Ottoman Empire in protecting Crete, rebuilt the lighthouse in 1864: only the base of the original lighthouse remains. In May 1915 a fixed white light was installed, marking it is an official lighthouse in Greece's network. The lighthouse suffered damage in World War II, and was refurbished in 2006.

== Characteristics ==
The lighthouse is a stone masonry tower rising 26 metres (85 ft) above the bay below. At the top there is a gallery and light that flashes red each 2.5 seconds.
