= Provveditore =

Italian-language title

The Italian title provveditore (pl. provveditori; also known in Greek: προνοητής, προβλεπτής; Serbo-Croatian: providur), "he who sees to things" (overseer), was the style of various (but not all) local district governors in the extensive, mainly maritime empire of the Republic of Venice. Like many political appointments, it was often held by noblemen as a stage in their career, usually for a few years.

== Adriatic home territory ==
- In the Stato di Terraferma, the continental part of northern Italy acquired by Venice, mainly in the 15th century, they were appointed in considerable number as part of a complex hierarchical structure, including territories (the upper level), podesterias, capitanatos, vicariatos, ecclesiastical and private jurisdictions etc.

== Overseas territories (Stato da Mar) ==
Some were Venetian possessions much earlier, but no data on the style of their governors exist; most were lost to the Ottoman Empire.

=== Eastern Adriatic ===
- On the Istria peninsula, a further territorio (now partly in Slovenia), e.g. Pola (Pula)
- Further south, in Dalmatia - cfr. infra
- Cattaro (Kotor), see List of Venetian governors of Kotor

=== Individual Ionian Islands ===
- Cephalonia, 1700−1799
- Cerigo (Kythera), full style castellano e provveditore, the first part referring to the citadel, cf. infra, 1698−1799
- Santa Maura (Leucada/Lefkada), 1700−1797
- Zante (Zakynthos), 1698−1807

=== Venetian coastal fortresses in continental Greece ===
- Coron, 1693−1715
- Modon (Methoni), 1697−1715
- Patrasso (Patras), 1687−1715
- Preveza, 1721−1791
- Vonitsa, 1719−1797

== Provveditore generale ==
The provveditore generale, or governor-general, was the style of Venetian state officials supervising a whole region of the dogal sway:

- Venetian Dalmatia (1409−1797)
- Morea (1688−1715), seat at Nauplion
- Provveditore generale da Mar, seat at Corfu
- Provveditore generale di Candia, seat at Candia (Heraklion)

== Special local titles ==
- On the Ionian island of Corfu, the equivalent Venetian governorship was styled Baili ('Baillif')
- Cerigotto (Antikythera) maintained its own feudal rulers, styled Moite, accepting Venetian suzerainty since 1309
- Style not known for the Venetian fortresses in present Greece at Parga, nor for Aegina island
- In Cyprus, the governorship was split between a civilian luogotenente and a military capitano

== Later Napoleonic use ==
Under French rule, Dalmatia was styled a provveditorate generale, or in French inspection générale in 1808, when it was integrated in the Napoleonic Italian kingdom, with three military subdivisions, Zara (Zadar), Spalato (Split, Spalatro), Bouches-du-Cattaro ('mouths of the river Kotor'), soon joined be the absorbed Ragusa (Dubrovnik), but on 14 October 1809 abolished and annexed into France's Illyrian provinces.

== See also ==
- Provveditori all'Armar
- Provveditori sopra Banchi
