= Battle of Kalamata (1685) =

Part of the Morean War

- Part of the Morean War
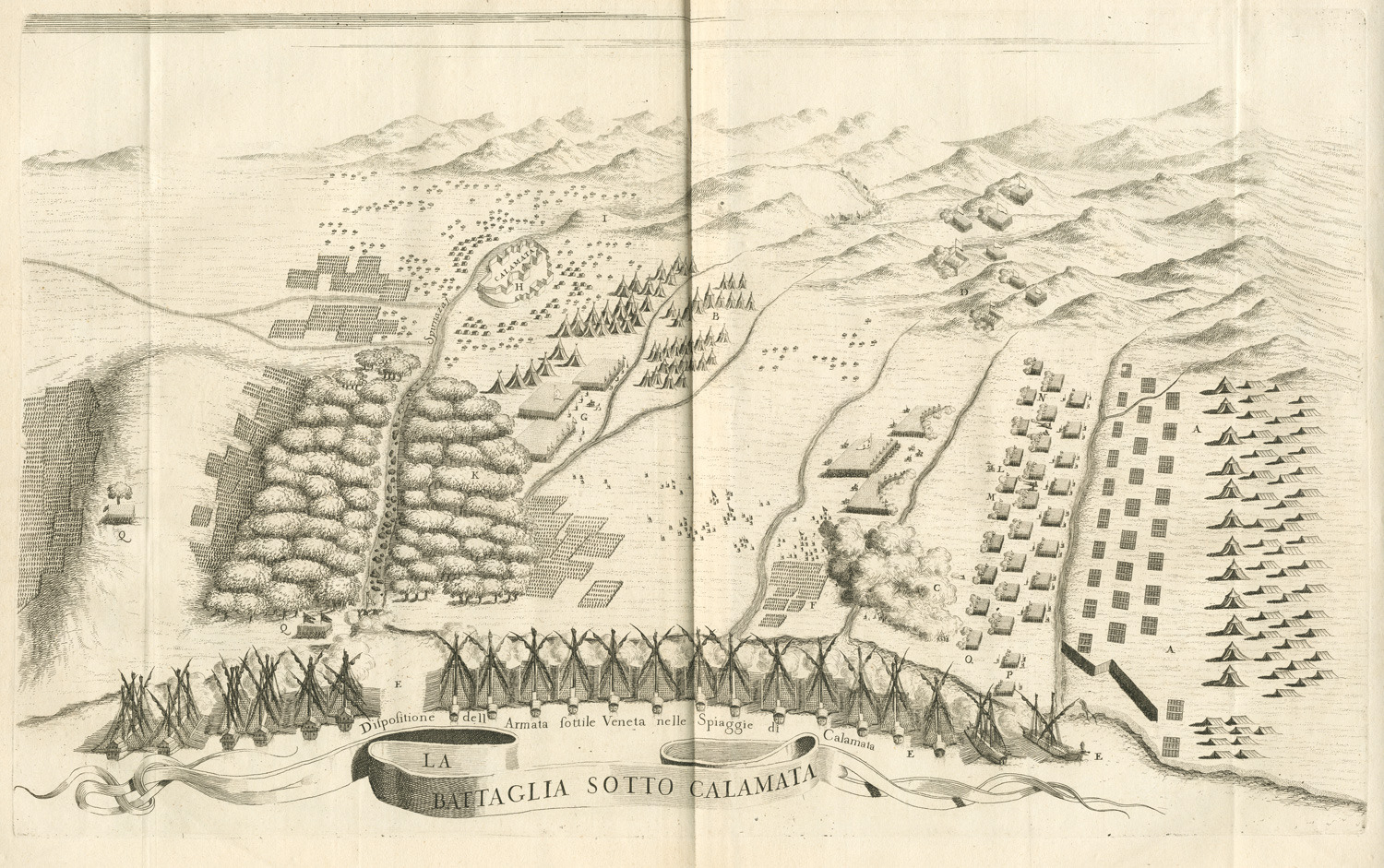
- The Battle of Kalamata, contemporary engraving by Vincenzo Coronelli
Date	14 September 1685
Location	Kalamata, Morea 37°02′00″N 22°07′20″E
Result	Venetian victory

Belligerents
Ottoman Empire	Republic of Venice

Commanders and leaders
Kapudan Pasha	Hannibal von Degenfeld
- Location within modern Greece

The Battle of Kalamata took place on 14 September 1685 between the expeditionary army of the Republic of Venice in the Morea, led by Hannibal von Degenfeld, and the forces of the Ottoman Empire, led by the Kapudan Pasha. The battle ended in a Venetian victory, which allowed the Venetians to complete the conquest of the Mani Peninsula, solidifying their foothold in the southern Morea. It was part of the Morean War of 1684 – 1699.

== Background ==
Kalamata is attested since the 12th century and had a castle, which became the seat of a major barony of the Frankish Principality of Achaea after 1205. During the Ottoman conquest of the Morea in 1458–1460, Kalamata passed under Venetian rule, but was lost to the Ottomans during the First Ottoman–Venetian War of 1463–1479. In 1659, during the Ottoman–Venetian war over Crete, in an attempt to distract Ottoman attention away from the Siege of Candia, the Venetian commander Francesco Morosini landed in Kalamata, and was joined by the restive local population, the Maniots and Arvanites. The Ottomans withdrew without offering much resistance: the castle was sacked and the town's inhabitants carried off by the Venetian fleet to serve as rowers in its galleys, but the venture, as with all similar raids instigated by Morosini at this time, did not have any major repercussions as the Venetians could not hold onto the isolated and exposed areas they captured.

In March 1684, with the Ottoman Empire smarting from its defeat at the Battle of Vienna and its military forces embroiled in a costly war with the Habsburg empire and Poland, Venice joined the anti-Ottoman Holy League with the aim of conducting a parallel campaign in Greece, and thus exact revenge for the recent loss of Crete. The opening actions of the conflict in Greece saw the capture of Santa Maura (Lefkada) and the mainland fortress of Preveza in 1684, but the main aim of Francesco Morosini, newly appointed as the Venetian commander-in-chief, was to capture the entire Morea as recompense for the loss of Crete. Based on his experiences from 1659, he hoped for assistance from the native population, which was showing signs of revolutionary stirrings. This was especially the case for the Maniots, who resented the loss of privileges and autonomy, including the establishment of Ottoman garrisons in local fortresses, that they had suffered due to their collaboration with the Venetians during the Cretan War. The Maniots entered into negotiations with the Venetians but the Ottomans pre-empted them: in spring 1685 the serasker (Ottoman commander-in-chief) of the Morea, Ismail Pasha, invaded the Mani Peninsula and forced the local population to submit, giving up their children as hostages. As a result, when Morosini's fleet approached the Morea in June 1685, Maniot envoys had met Morosini and asked him not to land at Mani, warning that the Maniots would not rise up until the Venetians had taken hold of a major fortress as a base of operations and refuge for their local allies. Morosini chose the fortress of Coron (Koroni) as his first target, lying across the Messenian Gulf from Mani. After defeating the Ottoman relief efforts and a 49-day siege, Coron was captured on 11 August and its garrison massacred.

== Battle ==
In the final stage of the siege, 230 Maniots under the Zakynthian noble Pavlos Makris had taken part, and soon Mani rose up in revolt, encouraged by the Venetian presence at Coron, and besieged the Ottoman garrisons in the castles of Zarnata and Kelefa. The Maniots, divided by mutual jealousies and rivalries, proved ineffective, and Morosini was forced to send ships and men to assist and rally them to a more determined pursuit of the sieges, and stop the garrisons' resupply over the sea. Zarnata surrendered on 10 September, its garrison of 600 being allowed safe passage to Kalamata, where the Kapudan Pasha had landed an army of six thousand infantry and two thousand sipahi cavalry, and established an entrenched camp between the Kalamata Castle and the mouth of the Nedon River. Morosini called upon the Kapudan Pasha to surrender Kalamata, but the latter refused. In the meantime, the original Venetian army in the Morea, some 8,200 men strong—3,100 Venetian mercenaries and 1,000 Schiavoni, 2,400 soldiers hired from the Duchy of Brunswick-Lüneburg, 1,000 men provided by the Knights Hospitaller of Malta, 400 Papal troops, and 300 men from the Grand Duchy of Tuscany—was reinforced with the arrival of 3,300 Saxons and placed under the command of general Hannibal von Degenfeld.

When Degenfeld held a council of war, he and most of his commanders held that the Ottoman camp was too strong to be assailed, and that an opinion advising against an attack was to be sent to Morosini. However, Duke Maximilian William of Brunswick-Lüneburg, who commanded the Hanoverian contingent, opposed this view, urging the council to simply implement Morosini's orders to attack the Ottoman army. This swayed Degenfeld, who gave the order to attack. The Venetian army was drawn up in a line east of the Ottoman camp, with the Schiavoni as the vanguard, the Hanoverians on the right, the Venetians in the centre, and the Saxons on the left. The Venetian army was supported by two field batteries, while the galleys Venetian fleet, arranged along the coast between the Venetian camp and the olive groves at the mouth of the Nedon, provided additional artillery support. In addition, the fleet was to feign a landing on the coast further west, to distract the Ottomans.

The battle began at dawn on 14 September, with both sides advancing. On the Venetian right, the Ottoman sipahis moved into the hills to await the Hanoverians, but the heights were captured by the Venetians' Maniot allies. On the left, the sipahis were repulsed by the Saxons, and the Venetians advanced along the whole line of the front, causing the Ottomans to fall back through the town, with the Maniots in close pursuit. Wary of a possible trap, the Venetian commanders climbed a hill that overlooked the castle and town to verify the Ottoman retreat, which became evident when the Ottomans put fire to their supply and ammunition stores.

After the battle, the Venetians demolished the castle, which was judged obsolete in an age of artillery warfare, and had already suffered considerable damage from the exploding Ottoman munitions. Its guns were removed, the houses of the garrison inside its walls were torched, and its gates and bastions blown up.

== Sources ==
- Andrews, Kevin (1978) [1953]. Castles of the Morea. Amsterdam: Adolf M. Hakkert. ISBN 90-256-0794-2.
- Chasiotis, Ioannis (1975). "Η κάμψη της Οθωμανικής δυνάμεως" [The decline of Ottoman power]. In Christopoulos, Georgios A. & Bastias, Ioannis K. (eds.). Ιστορία του Ελληνικού Έθνους [History of the Greek Nation] (in Greek). Vol. ΙΑ: Ο Ελληνισμός υπό ξένη κυριαρχία (περίοδος 1669 - 1821), Τουρκοκρατία - Λατινοκρατία [Hellenism under Foreign Rule (Period 1669 - 1821), Turkocracy – Latinocracy]. Athens: Ekdotiki Athinon. ISBN 978-960-213-100-8.
- Finlay, George (1877). A History of Greece from its Conquest by the Romans to the Present Time, B.C. 146 to A.D. 1864, Vol. V: Greece under Othoman and Venetian Domination A.D. 1453–1821. Oxford: Clarendon Press.
- Setton, Kenneth Meyer (1991). Venice, Austria, and the Turks in the Seventeenth Century. Philadelphia: The American Philosophical Society. ISBN 0-87169-192-2.
- Topping, Peter (1976). "Venice's Last Imperial Venture". Proceedings of the American Philosophical Society. 120 (3): 159–165. JSTOR 986555.

== Primary accounts ==
- Locatelli, Alessandro (1691). Racconto historico della Veneta guerra in Levante diretta dal valore del Serenissimo Principe Francesco Morosini (in Italian). Cologne. pp. 153–169.
- The History of the Venetian Conquests, from the Year 1684 to this Present Year 1688. Translated Out of French by J. M. London: John Newton. 1688. pp. 53–55.
