= Christoph Martin von Degenfeld =

German military commander (1599–1653)

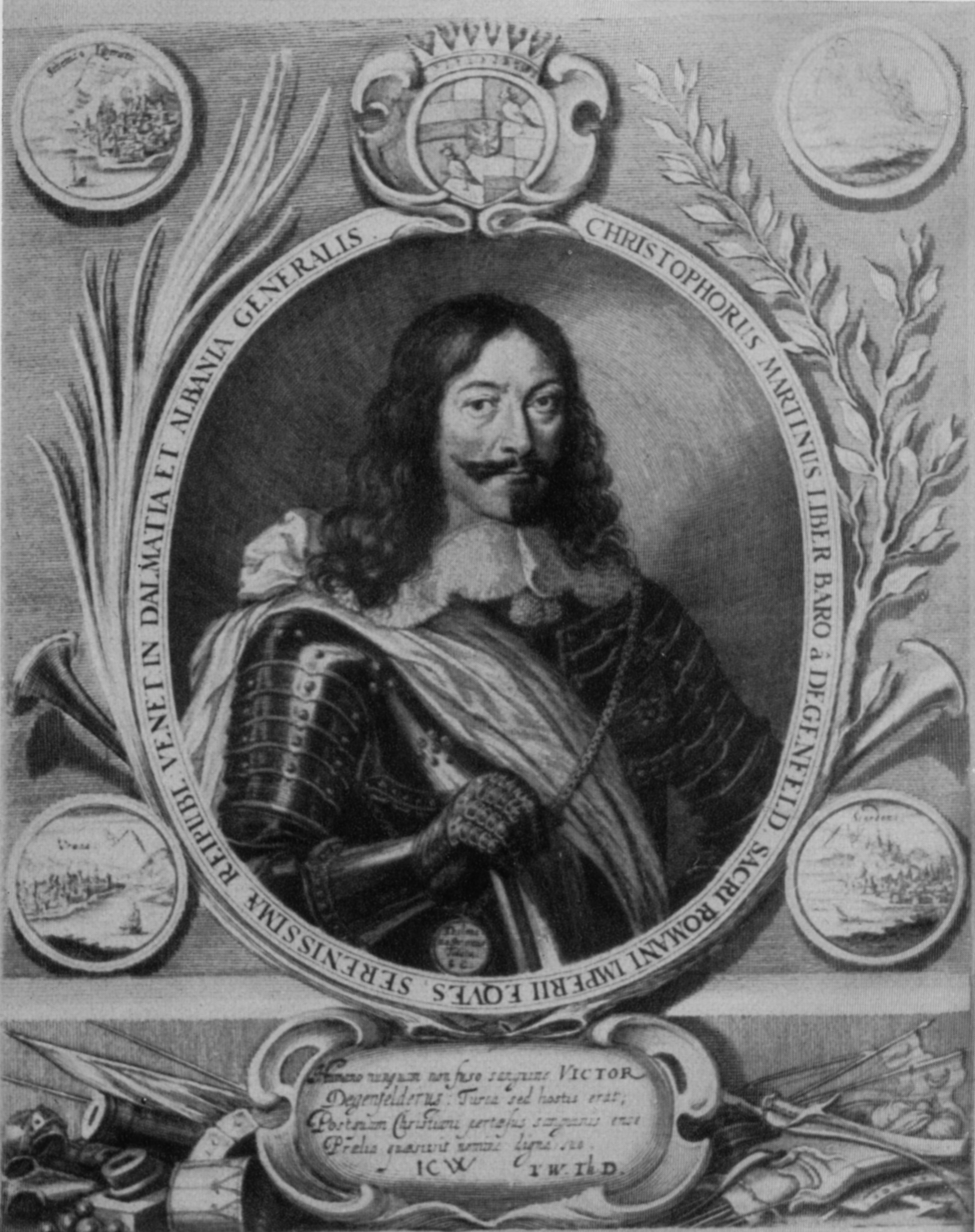
- Engraving of Christoph Martin von Degenfeld as the Venetian commander-in-chief in Dalmatia, by Bartholomäus Kilian
- Born: 1599
- Died: 1653 (aged 53–54)
- Children: Hannibal (son), Loysa (daughter)
- Military career
- Allegiance: Habsburg monarchy (1621–1630); Sweden (1632–1634); France (1634–1642); Republic of Venice (1642–1649)
- Conflicts: Battle of Wimpfen, Battle of Höchst, Siege of Bergen op Zoom (1622), Battle of Lutter, Siege of Nuremberg, Battle of Lützen (1632)

Christoph Martin Freiherr von Degenfeld (1599–1653) was a German military commander who served the Habsburgs, Sweden and France (1634–1640) during the Thirty Years War, and the Republic of Venice during the Cretan War against the Ottoman Empire. The descendant of an old Swabian noble family, he was orphaned at a young age but received an excellent education at German universities, before beginning his military career in 1621 in the Habsburg army. As a cavalry commander he distinguished himself in Habsburg service under Wallenstein and Tilly, being promoted, knighted, and restored to his family's old title of Freiherr. With his regiment disbanded and his older brothers dying without offspring, Degenfeld left military service in 1630 to devote himself to his family estates. In 1632 he entered Swedish service and raised two cavalry regiments, serving with distinction but falling out with the Swedes before the Battle of Nördlingen, after which he lost all his estates to the victorious Habsburg forces. Degenfeld left with his family for France, where he was soon appointed as commander-in-chief of all foreign cavalry regiments. Again he served with distinction, before court intrigues forced him to abandon French service in 1642. He then entered Venetian service, and fought in Dalmatia against the Ottoman Empire. His six sons also followed a military or courtly career, while his daughter Loysa was the morganatic second wife of Charles I Louis, Elector Palatine.

== Life ==
Christoph Martin von Degenfeld was born in 1599 at his family's Hoheneybach Castle near Geislingen an der Steige in the Duchy of Württemberg. Christoph Martin was the third son of Konrad von Degenfeld and his wife, Margaretha von Byllenhart. The family hailed originally from Switzerland, before they acquired Hoheneybach in the mid-15th century; the heads of the family entered the service of the Dukes of Württemberg thereafter. Konrad was killed in an accident in 1600, and as Konrad's father Christoph also died in 1604, Christoph Martin and his two older brothers were taken into guardianship. Their guardians mismanaged the family's estates, but ensured that the brothers received an excellent education at various universities and through extensive travels. Christoph Martin thus studied at the universities of Strasbourg, Tübingen, and Jena, and undertook a Grand Tour in Switzerland, France, England, and the Netherlands.

=== In Habsburg service ===
Although the Degenfeld family had been Protestant since the mid-16th century, Christoph Martin and his brother Christoph Wolfgang entered service with the Habsburg Imperial Army in 1621, during the ongoing Thirty Years' War. Christoph Martin served as Rittmeister (cavalry captain) in the cuirassier regiment of Julius Henry, Duke of Saxe-Lauenburg under the Imperial general Albrecht von Wallenstein against the Prince of Transylvania, Gabriel Bethlen, and then under Tilly against the Protestant-aligned military commander Ernst von Mansfeld. Degenfeld particularly distinguished himself for his bravery at the battles of Wimpfen and Höchst in 1622, during which he captured the army kettle drums of Christian the Younger of Brunswick. For this he was promoted on the battlefield to the rank of Obristwachtmeister (major) and received the privilege of bringing news of the victory to Archduke Leopold Wilhelm of Austria. In addition, Degenfeld received from Emperor Ferdinand II the restoration of his family's ancient, but in the meantime lost, title of Freiherr. His subsequent career in Habsburg service saw Degenfeld fighting against the Dutch Republic under Ambrogio Spinola at the Siege of Bergen op Zoom in 1622), and in Jutland under Tilly against Christian IV of Denmark at the Battle of Lutter in 1626.

=== In Swedish service ===
As both of his brothers died without offspring—the oldest, Christoph Wilhelm, died in 1624, while Christoph Woflgang was killed at the Siege of Mantua in 1630—and his regiment was disbanded, in 1630 Degenfeld withdrew to his family's estates, whose sole heir he now was. On his dismissal from Imperial service, Degenfeld was knighted by the Emperor, and received permission to carry a white eagle as a charge on his coat of arms. He did not rest for long, however: when the Swedish king Gustavus Adolphus invaded southern Germany in 1632, Degenfeld raised two regiments of cavalry, and entered Swedish service as their colonel. Fighting now for the Protestant cause, he distinguished himself at the Siege of Nuremberg, the Battle of Lützen, the siege of Villingen, and independent operations across Swabia. For his services he was granted large estates that the Swedes had confiscated in Swabia—Kapfenburg, Straßberg, Lautlingen, mediatised ecclesiastical domains near Schwäbisch Gmünd and of Schussenried Abbey—but these, and even the previous family possessions, were lost after the crushing Habsburg victory at the Battle of Nördlingen in September 1634.

=== In French service ===
Degenfeld abandoned the Swedish camp before Nördlingen, after having come into conflict with senior Swedish generals over the conduct of the war and the Swedes' dismissive attitude towards the Germans. Having made enemies of both sides in the war, Degenfeld and his family were forced to flee to Strasbourg, where he received proposals to enter French service. On 5 December 1634 he signed a contract to that effect, and raised two cavalry regiments, mostly recruited from his former German soldiers. In 1635 he was promoted to colonel général de la cavallerie étrangère (colonel-general of the foreign cavalry) and thus commander-in-chief over 16 cavalry regiments, being the last person to actually hold this position. He carried out his duties with distinction, serving under several French marshals: the Duke of Châtillon, the Duke of La Force, the Marquis of Brézé, and the Duke of La Meilleraye. At the Battle of Raon in 1636 Degenfeld took the Imperial general Hieronymus von Colloredo-Waldsee prisoner along with the latter's entire regiment. His success aroused envy, and after court intrigues and friction between him and Cardinal Richelieu, who had initially supported him but later suspected him due to his friendship with Louis, Count of Soissons, Degenfeld left French service in 1642. Degenfeld and his family left for Geneva, from where he tried to use his connections to reconcile himself with the Habsburg Emperor in the hopes to recover his ancestral estates. At Geneva, Degenfeld accepted a lucrative offer from the Republic of Venice to enter its service for seven years.

=== In Venetian service ===
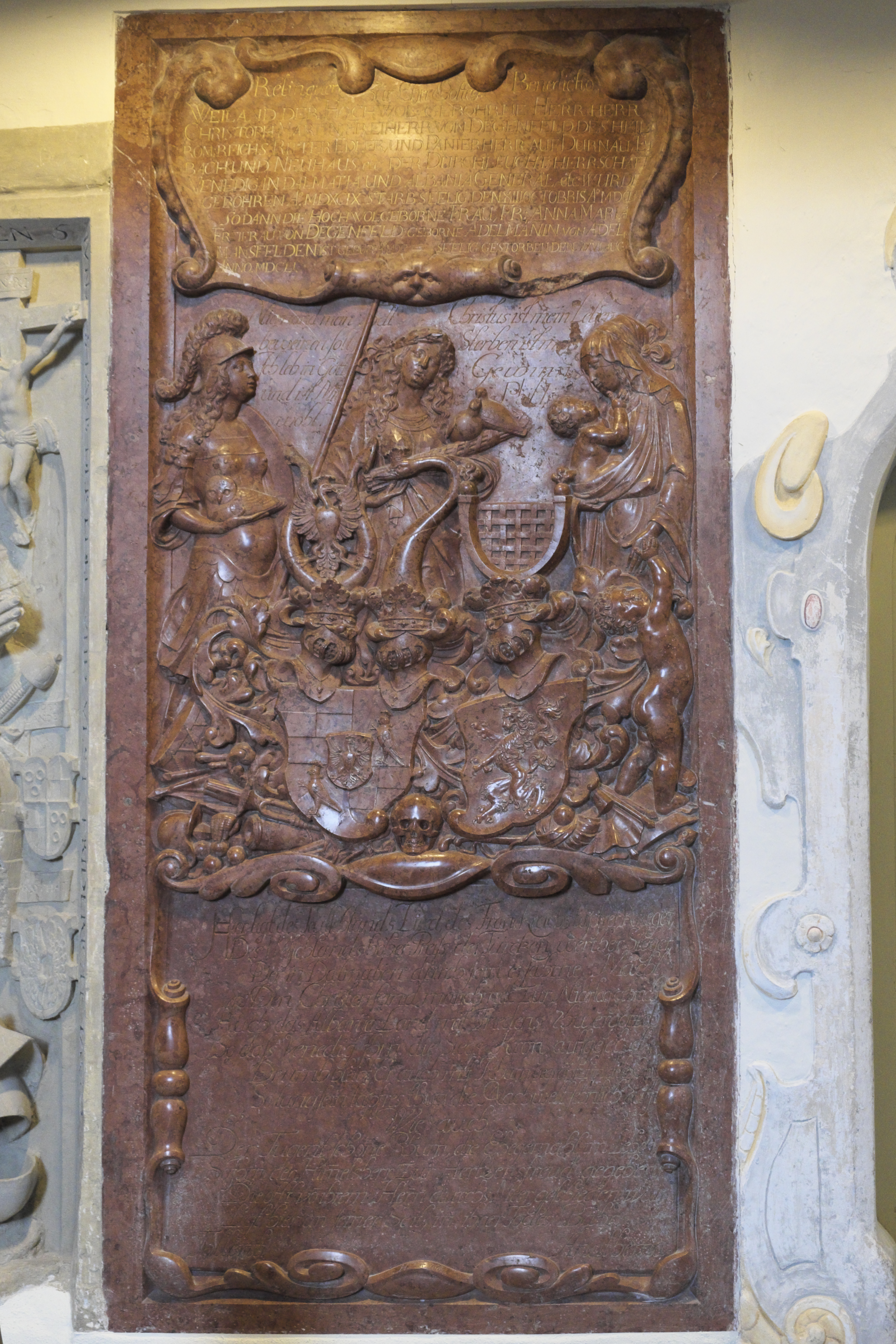
Christoph Martin von Degenfeld's tombstone at the Church of St. Cyriakus, Dürnau

Degenfeld arrived at Venice on 14 December 1642. At the time, Venice was embroiled in the conflict around possession of the Duchy of Castro, supporting the claims of Odoardo Farnese, Duke of Parma, against Pope Urban VIII. Degenfeld assumed the post of general of the cavalry in the Venetian army led by the provveditore generale Giovanni Pesaro. The war was not especially resolutely pursued by either side, and the Venetian army was not involved in major combat before the conflict was finally ended with French mediation in 1644, whereupon the Venetians quickly disbanded their forces. After the war concluded, Degenfeld was sent both Imperial and French offers to return to their employ; given that his contract with Venice ran until 1649, Degenfeld refused.

Shortly after, in June 1645, the war with the Ottoman Empire broke out, which allowed Degenfeld to show his skill and cement his military reputation. The Venetian Leonardo Foscolo was sent as provveditore generale for Dalmatia and Venetian Albania, with Degenfeld as a professional soldier at his side. Although starved of resources and men and confounded by the suspicious and parsimonious Venetian administration, the two men would prove to be capable and resolute, and exploited the geography of the region to its advantage: the coastal towns and fortresses were linked into a network of strongpoints, that could be reinforced at any time with troops and heavy artillery by sea to counter any Ottoman attacks, thanks to Venice's undisputed mastery of the Adriatic.

Accompanied by his eldest son, Ferdinand, Degenfeld landed at Zara (Zadar) in August 1645. He relieved the Ottoman pressure on Zara and Sebenico (Šibenik), captured the fortresses of Vrana—where Ferdinand suffered a wound to his eyes that left him blind—Zemonico (Zemunik Donji) and Scardona (Skradin), and repulsed an attack on Sebenico. The capture of the pirate nests of Macarsca (Makarska), Duare (Zadvarje) and Primorgi secured the sea lanes and the territorial cohesion of the Venetian possessions, while a campaign in summer 1647 impressed the Morlachs, who had hitherto raided Venetian shipping, to switch to the Republic's side. Degenfeld returned to Venice in 1648 amidst much acclamation, but the unfamiliar climate and hardships had taken their toll; when his contract ran out in the next year, he asked to be dismissed, and returned to tend to tend to his war-torn Swabian estates. There he died at Eybach on 13 October 1653.

== Family ==
Christoph Martin von Degenfeld married his cousin, Anna Maria Adelmann von Adelmannsfelden (died 26 August 1651), at Dürnau on 22 April 1628. They had ten children, six boys and four girls:

- Ferdinand (1629–1710), who despite his blindness became the head and custodian of the family after his father's death.
- Gustav, entered Swedish service, reached the rank of colonel and was killed at the Assault on Copenhagen in 1659.
- Adolf, entered Venetian service, reached the rank of colonel and died of his wounds during the Siege of Candia in 1668.
- Christoph, entered Venetian service and succeeded Adolf in command at Candia, later served in the Saxon and Palatinate armies.
- Maximilian (1645–1697), entered Palatinate service and became colonel and ambassador.
- Hannibal, served in the Venetian, Dutch and Danish armies, organized the standing Bavarian Army and led it during the Battle of Vienna, died as Venetian commander-in-chief in the Morean War in 1691.
- Loysa, married Charles I Louis, Elector Palatine and received the title of Raugravine.

Loysa's granddaughter Maria von Schomburg (1692–1762) married in 1717 her cousin, Maximilian's grandson, Christoph Martin Count von Degenfeld (1689–1762), giving rise to the Degenfeld-Schonburg line.

== Sources ==
- Eickhoff, Ekkehard (2009). Venedig, Wien und die Osmanen: Umbruch in Südosteuropa 1645–1700 (in German) (Fifth ed.). Klett-Cotta. ISBN 978-3-608-94511-9.
- Fuchs, Peter (1957). "Degenfeld, Loysa Freifrau von". Neue Deutsche Biographie. Vol. 3. pp. 559–560.
- Pfister, Albert; von Landmann, Carl (1877). "Degenfeld, Christoph Martin Freiherr von". Allgemeine Deutsche Biographie, herausgegeben von der Historischen Kommission bei der Bayerischen Akademie der Wissenschaften. Allgemeine Deutsche Biographie (in German). Vol. 5. pp. 23–26.
- Setton, Kenneth Meyer (1991). Venice, Austria, and the Turks in the Seventeenth Century. Philadelphia: The American Philosophical Society. ISBN 0-87169-192-2.
- Thürheim, Andreas (1881). Christoph Martin, Freiherr von Degenfeld, General der Venezianer, General-Gouverneur von Dalmazien und Albanien, und dessen Söhne (1600—1733) (in German). Vienna: Wilhelm Braumüller.
- Uhland, Robert (1957). "Degenfeld, Christoph Martin Freiherr von". Neue Deutsche Biographie (in German). Vol. 3. pp. 558–559.
