= Kalamata Castle =

Ruined castle in Kalamata, Greece

- Κάστρο της Καλαμάτας
- Kalamata, Peloponnese, Greece
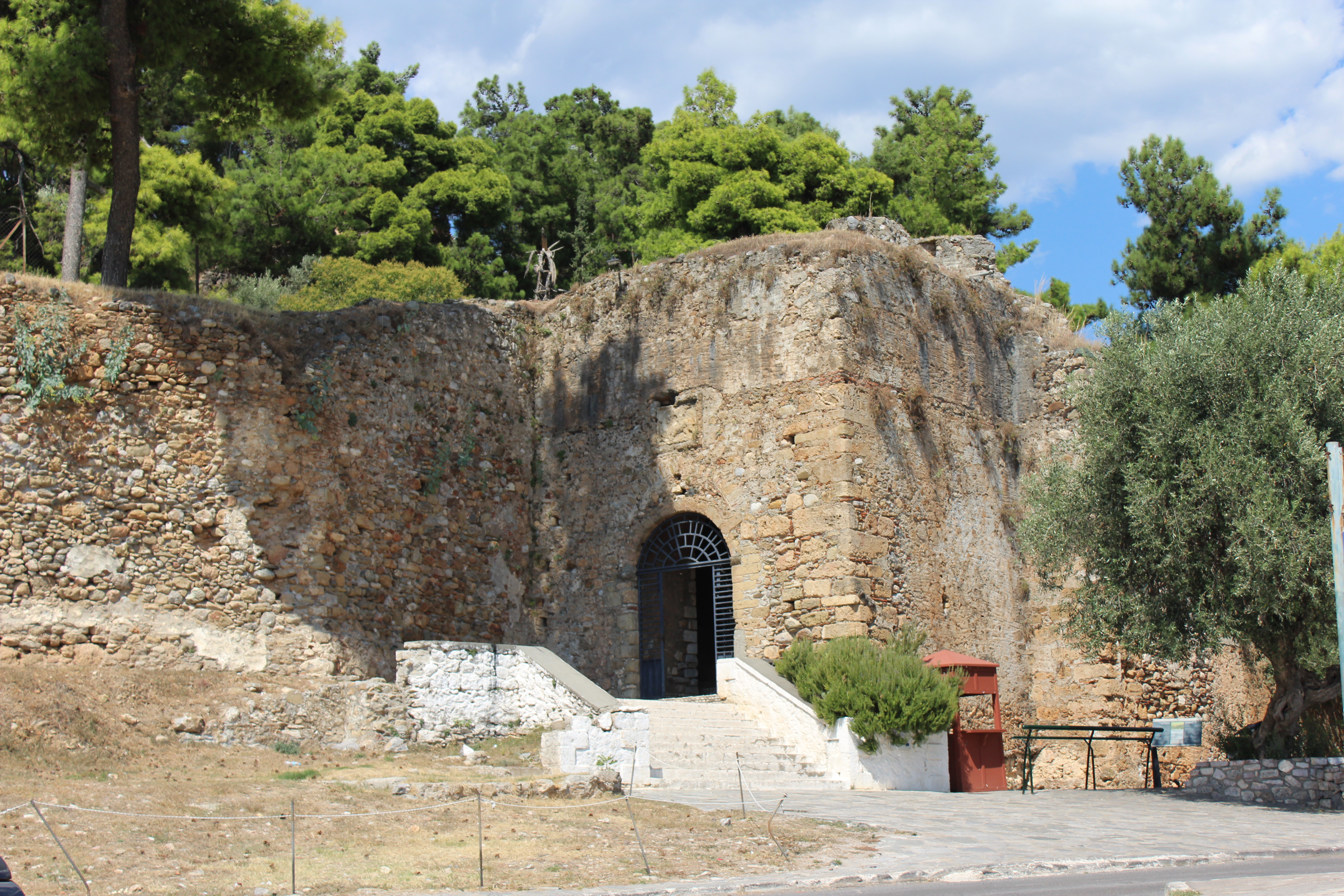
- Entrance to the castle, 2018

Site information
- Type: citadel
- Owner: Hellenic Ministry of Culture
- Controlled by: Principality of Achaea 13th century–1685
- Open to the public: Yes
- Condition: Ruin

Location
- Coordinates: 37°02′45″N 22°07′00″E

Site history
- Built: 13th Century
- Built by: Principality of Achaea
- In use: 13th century–1685
- Materials: Limestone

The Castle of Kalamata (Greek: Κάστρο της Καλαμάτας) is a ruined medieval fortress in Kalamata, the capital of Messenia in southern Greece. The present structure dates to the 13th century, being built by the Crusaders who founded the Principality of Achaea. It replaced (while incorporating some parts) an earlier Byzantine castle, that was in turn built on the site of the acropolis of ancient Pharae. The castle was largely razed in 1685, after being captured by the Venetians.

== History ==
Attested since the 10th century, Kalamata occupies the site of the ancient city of Pharae, on whose acropolis the medieval castle was built. The original castle was built by the Byzantine Empire, but by the time of the arrival of the Frankish Crusaders in 1205, it was in poor condition and had been transformed into a monastery, which was able to offer only brief resistance to the conquerors. Kalamata became one of the twelve baronies of the Principality of Achaea, and was assigned as the patrimony of the princely family, the Villehardouins. The repaired castle became the centre of the barony and a favourite residence; Prince William II of Villehardouin was born and died there. After his death, the castellany of Kalamata passed to his widow, Anna Komnene Doukaina, but its strategic importance meant that it was recovered by the princely domain in 1282.

The castle was briefly captured in 1293 or 1295 by local Slavs living in the nearby district of Gianitsa. One of the Slavs, while prisoner in the donjon, had measured the height of the wall to his cell window with a rope. When he was released, he built a ladder of the same height, and during a night he and fifty companions entered the tower. On the next day, assisted by a six hundred further Slavs, the Franks were driven away from the castle. The Slavic occupation was brief, as the Franks recovered it with assistance from a local Greek chieftain. In the aftermath of this episode, the Franks increased the height of the castle's walls. Kalamata remained in Frankish hands almost until the end of the Principality of Achaea, being captured by the Byzantines of the Despotate of the Morea only in 1428.

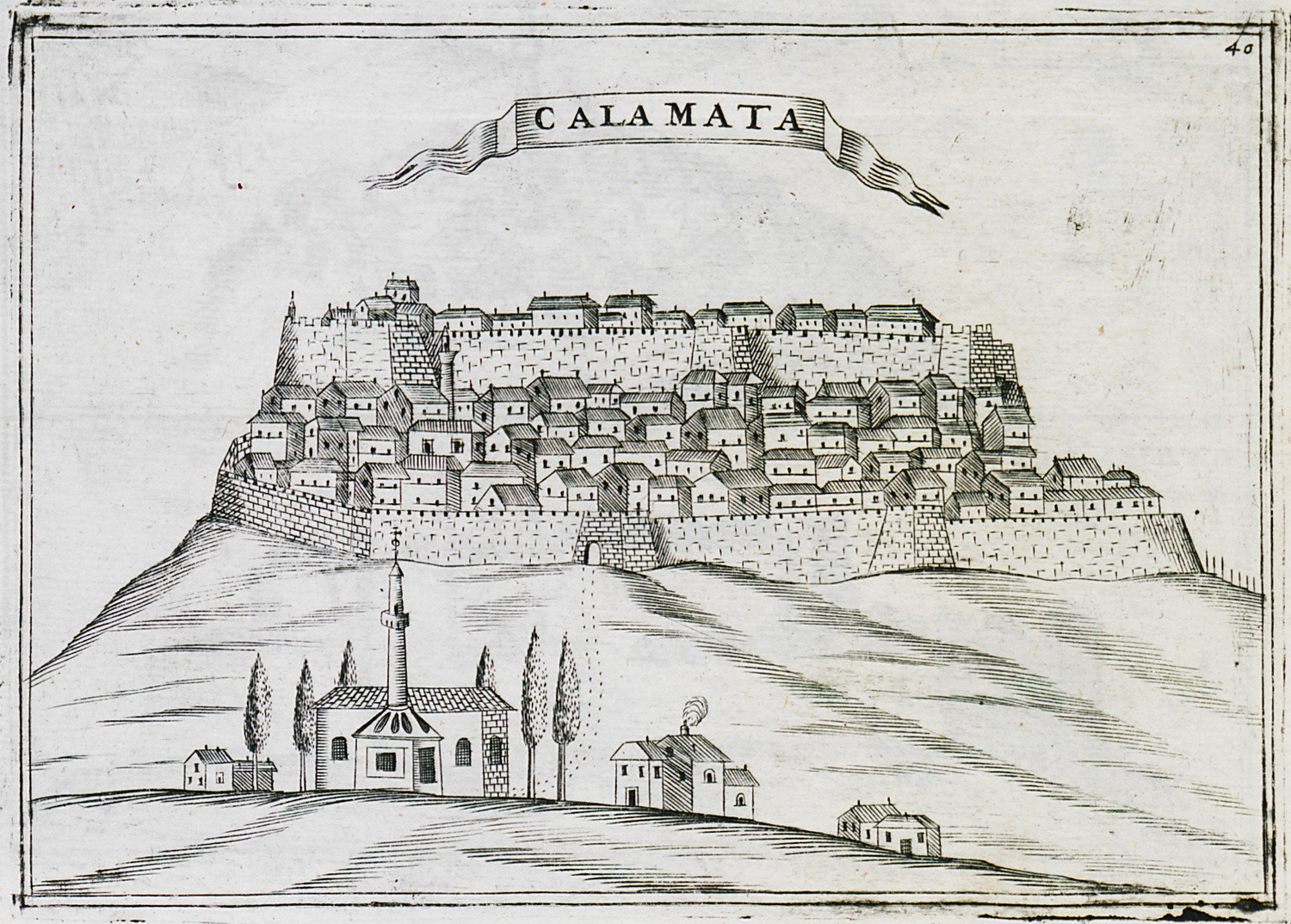
View of the castle and the settlement within at the time of the Venetian conquest in 1685, by Vincenzo Coronelli

After the Ottoman conquest of the Morea in 1458–1460, Kalamata was held by the Republic of Venice, along with several other Moreot fortresses, but was lost during the First Ottoman–Venetian War in 1463–1479. In 1659, in an attempt to divert Ottoman attention away from the ongoing Siege of Candia, the Venetians under Francesco Morosini raided Kalamata and sacked the castle, but did not occupy it. Morosini returned in 1685, at the start of the Morean War: on 14 September 1685 the Venetians defeated an Ottoman army before Kalamata. The retreating Ottomans set fire to their ammunition stores, which inflicted great damage to the castle. Judging it obsolete in an age of ever evolving siege artillery, the Venetians dismantled it. Nevertheless, the presence of a Lion of Saint Mark over the main gate, as well as some other architectural traces show that the Venetians rebuilt at least the outer circuit wall of the castle during the second period of Venetian rule, sometime shortly after 1701.

During the 18th century, the castle lost its military significance and was abandoned. It suffered further extensive damage in 1825, during the Greek War of Independence, by the forces of Ibrahim Pasha of Egypt. In the early 20th century it was transformed into a park by the writer Zacharias Papantoniou, who at the time served as prefect of Messenia. The castle is a protected monument under the auspices of the Messenia Ephorate of Antiquities, and is open to visits from the public.

== Description ==
The castle lies on a hilltop on the northern part of the modern city, at the point where the Nedon river exits a gorge in Mount Taygetos and turns south across the coastal plain towards the Messenian Gulf; The river passes just to the west of the hill on which the castle is located.

The Byzantine castle, being in poor state in 1205, was heavily rebuilt by the Crusaders. The castle is in ruined state and very poorly preserved, but what is visible today appears to be substantially the same as the 13th-century Frankish castle; there is little evidence of the prior structure or any subsequent alterations. According to the historian Kevin Andrews, the lack of space and its "eminent, but not pre-eminent position", contributed to the castle never being modernized as an artillery fortress. As a result, it retains the features of a "typical early medieval castle, with donjon, inner redoubt, and outer enclosure".

The inner enceinte lies on an oblong terrace with rough north–south orientation. The inner circuit wall has been razed to the level of the ground behind them. The donjon at the northernmost corner and a small square tower on the eastern side, and a bastion in the southeast, protecting the only gate (with some Byzantine-era stonework), survive. The donjon survives only in part, as a result of the demolitions of 1685. It is a rectangular structure of 40 by 60 feet (12 m × 18 m), with a rectangular addition to the west, some 34 by 16 feet (10.4 m × 4.9 m), which houses a cistern. The ashlar blocks of the latter may be remnants of the ancient fortifications of Pharae. Inside the donjon are remains of the katholikon church of the Byzantine-era monastery attested in 1205. The outer circuit wall covers only the eastern flank of the hill. It begins from the outer wall of the donjon, and proceeds northeast and then sharply southeast, again with a small square tower and a gate with a redan (apparently built after 1701 and replacing a gate that directly pierced the outer wall), before rejoining the inner circuit wall on its southern tip.

== Sources ==
- Andrews, Kevin (1978) [1953]. Castles of the Morea. Amsterdam: Adolf M. Hakkert. ISBN 90-256-0794-2.
- Bon, Antoine (1969). La Morée franque. Recherches historiques, topographiques et archéologiques sur la principauté d'Achaïe [The Frankish Morea. Historical, Topographic and Archaeological Studies on the Principality of Achaea] (in French). Paris: De Boccard.
- Gregory, Timothy E. (1991). "Kalamata". In Kazhdan, Alexander (ed.). The Oxford Dictionary of Byzantium. Oxford and New York: Oxford University Press. p. 1091. ISBN 0-19-504652-8.
