= Battle of the Alte Veste =

1632 battle of the Thirty Years' War

Coordinates: 49°27′11.5″N 10°57′54″E

Battle of Alte Veste
- Part of the siege of Nuremberg; Swedish intervention in the Thirty Years' War
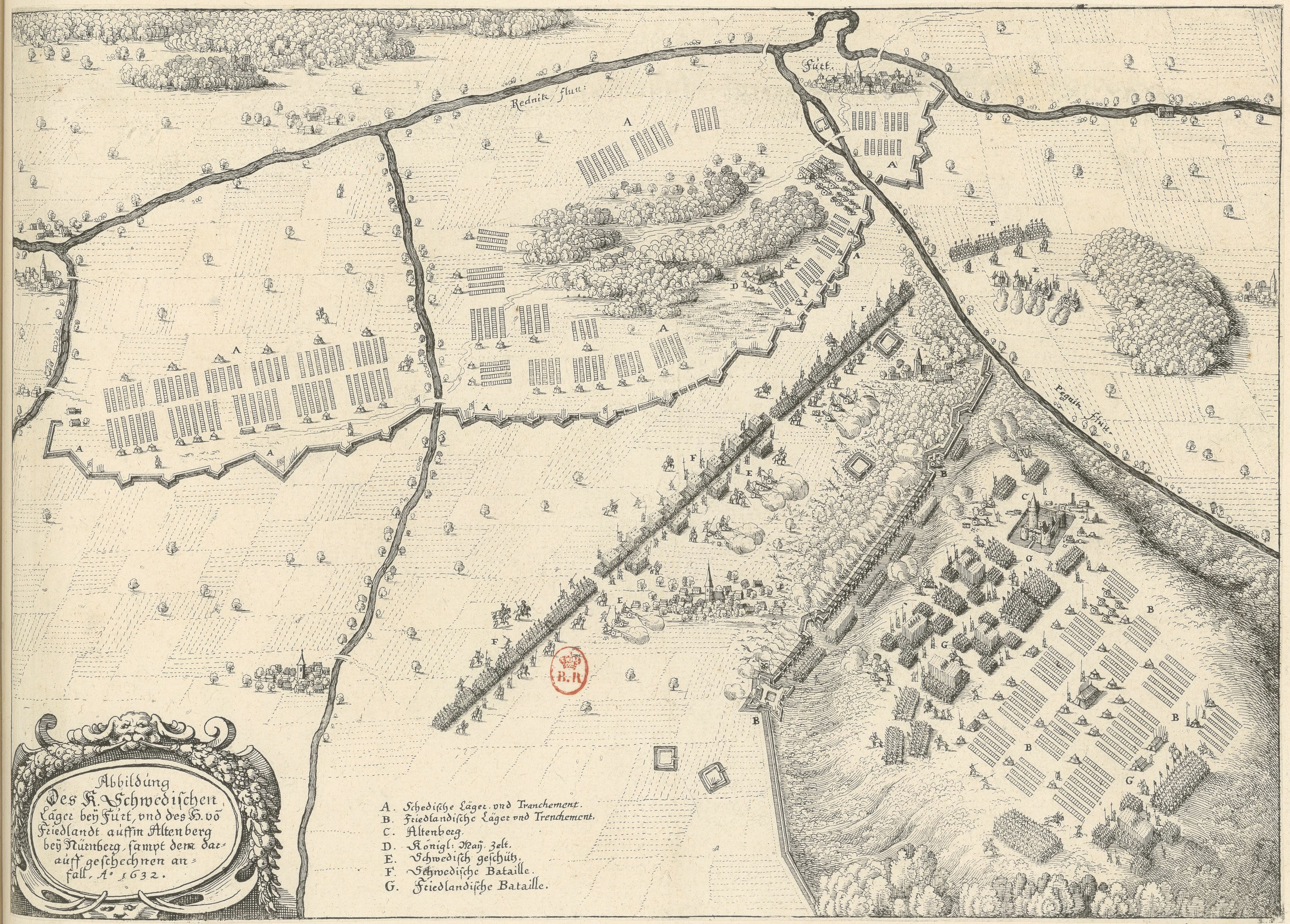
- A map of the Battle
Date	3–4 September 1632 (N.S.)
Location	Alte Veste, southwest of Nürnberg, Franconian Circle, Holy Roman Empire (present-day Bavaria, Germany)
Result	Imperial victory

Belligerents
Holy Roman Empire; Catholic League	Swedish Empire

Commanders and leaders
(Holy Roman Empire) Albrecht von Wallenstein; Johann von Aldringen	(Swedish Empire) Gustavus Adolphus (Swedish Empire) Wilhelm of Weimar (Swedish Empire) Bernard of Saxe-Weimar (Swedish Empire) Lennart Torstensson (POW) (Swedish Empire) Johan Banér (WIA)

Strength
43,500 men	45,430 men: • 30,011 infantry; • 15,419 cavalry

Casualties and losses
900	2,500

The Battle of the Alte Veste or Battle of Fürth was a significant battle of the Thirty Years' War in which Gustavus Adolphus' attacking forces were defeated by Wallenstein's entrenched troops. It was fought on 3 September 1632 (in the process of the siege of Nuremberg) between the Catholic forces of Holy Roman Emperor Ferdinand II and the Protestant forces of King Gustavus II Adolphus of Sweden during the period of Swedish intervention in the Thirty Years War.

The tactical victory by the Catholic forces allowed the Imperial army to quickly advance into Saxony, while the Swedish forces were forced into retreat.

== Background ==
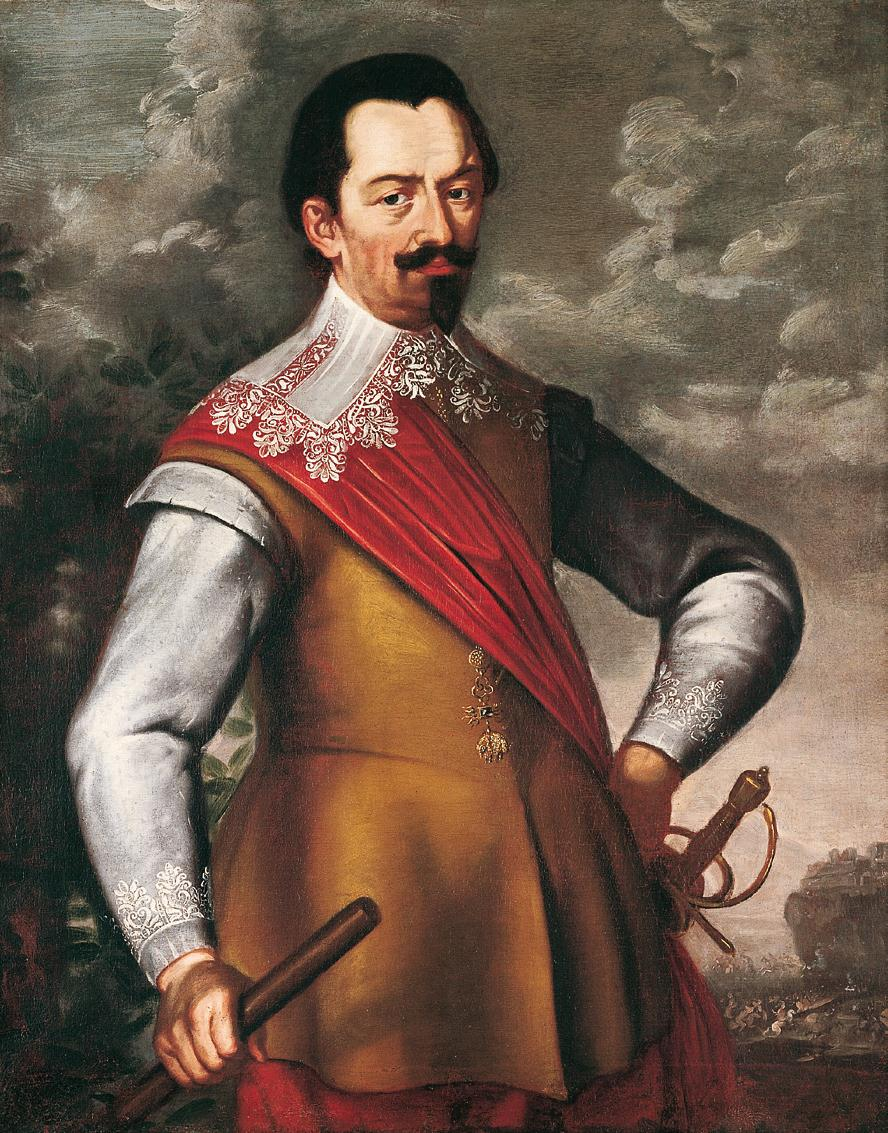
Leader of the Catholic forces, General Albrecht von Wallenstein

In the late summer of 1632 the army of Swedish King Gustavus Adolphus met Albrecht von Wallenstein near Nürnberg. The earlier successes of Gustavus Adolphus over General Tilly, particularly at Breitenfeld, followed by Tilly's death during the Battle of Rain, forced Holy Roman Emperor Ferdinand II to recall Albrecht von Wallenstein into military service from retirement. Wallenstein was unmatched in his ability to raise troops, and within a few weeks he took to the field with a fresh army.

The Imperial Army's ranks swelled as Wallenstein moved to stop the Swedes' advance at Nuremberg. Repeatedly, Gustavus formed for battle and challenged Wallenstein to come out of his fortified camp, but was refused. As the supply situation continued to worsen, the impetuous King grew desperate.

Fürth was a market town, whose marketing license had been suspended under Holy Roman Emperor Heinrich III, losing the privilege and all that went with it, to nearby Nürnberg (English: Nuremberg) shortly after its founding. This situation changed after Heinrich's death, and in 1062 Fürth was once again permitted to have its own market. However, Fürth could not readily compete with Nuremberg, which had steadily grown and prospered in the ensuing years. In the following centuries, the City of Nuremberg became the most important town in the region, even making Fürth subservient to it at one point, despite Fürth's strategic importance. The character of the settlement of Fürth remained afterward largely agricultural. Consequently, in 1600 the population was probably still only 1,000–2,000.

The town of Fürth is situated to the east and south of the rivers Rednitz and Pegnitz, which join to form the Regnitz to the northwest of the town center. The ford across the Regnitz, the reason for the original founding of the settlement, is the feature which gave Fürth its strategic importance as an access point to Nuremberg during the Protestant champion's, King Gustavus Adolphus of Sweden, campaign through Bavaria.

In spring of 1632, Gustavus Adolphus had handed the Habsburg Emperor, Ferdinand II, a major defeat at Rain, where the head of the Catholic army, Count Tilly, had fallen. Subsequently, he had taken the Free Imperial City of Augsburg without struggle, and on 17 May had marched into Munich unmolested. He subsequently occupied Nuremberg, encamping his army outside of the city.

== Build-up ==
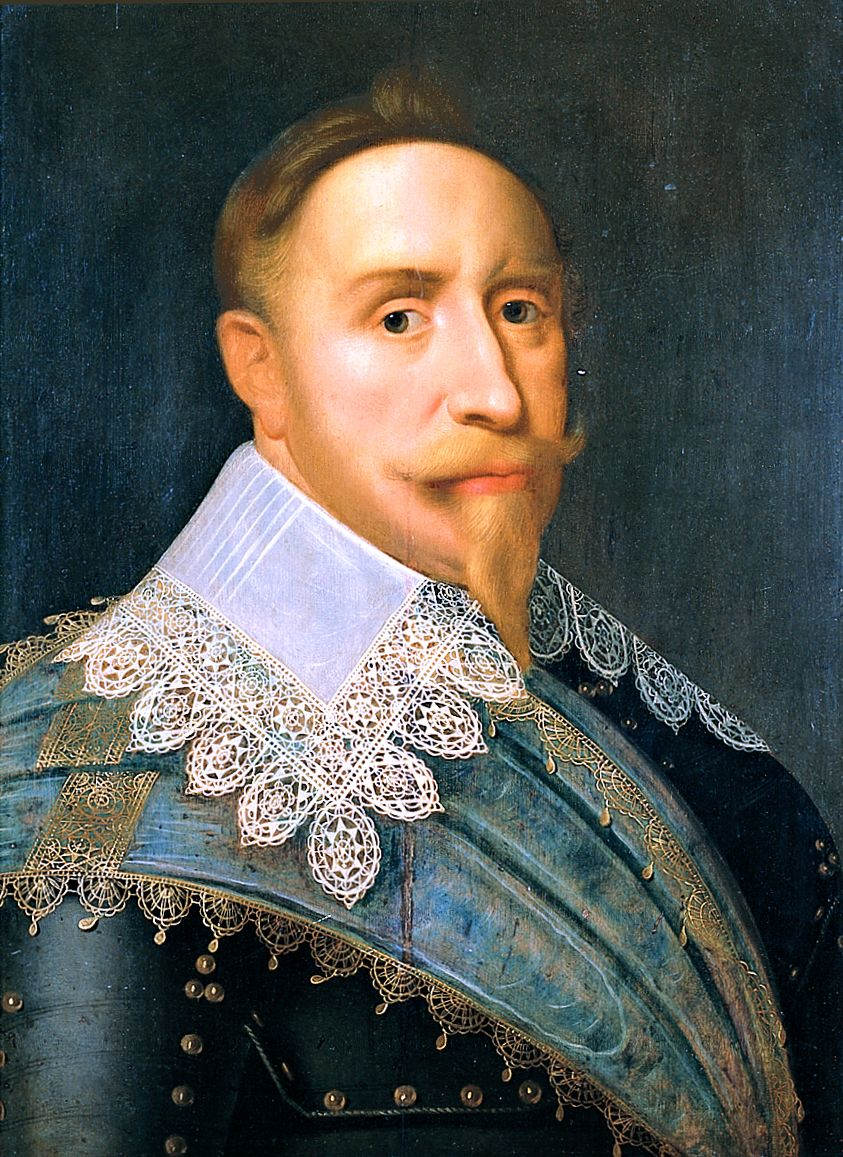
King Gustavus II Adolph

When Gustavus Adolphus marched on Fürth in late August 1632, it was arguably the greatest blunder in his German campaign. His opponent in the battle, and Tilley's successor, was General Albrecht von Wallenstein, who had been recalled by the Emperor. In the spring of 1632, Wallenstein had raised a fresh army within just a few weeks and had taken to the field. He had quickly driven the Saxon army from Bohemia, and then advanced northwestward (aiming to campaign into Protestant-aligned Saxony). Wallenstein set camp and built defensive earthworks at Fürth. There he encountered Gustavus Adolphus, who had previously fired the town of Fürth in June, and who had come back up from the south and taken Nuremberg in order to oppose Wallenstein's designs on Saxony. Gustavus Adolphus soon tested Wallenstein's strength at the Battle of the Alte Veste (the "old fort") in late August, which resulted in a nominal Catholic victory, and forced the Protestant forces to quickly encamp in a defensive position, being nearly cut off from additional help. Gustavus Adolphus, the experienced besieger, now found himself besieged by Wallenstein's much larger force.

== Battle ==
Gustavus Adolphus was finally reinforced on 1 September (N.S.). There followed the disastrous 3 September (N.S.) attempt on Wallenstein's well-entrenched forces; where the Protestant's offensive force suffered 2,500 casualties. Gustavus Adolphus could not thereafter successfully persuade Wallenstein to take to battle on an open field. Wallenstein's post-battle tactic of maintaining a strictly defensive, well-fortified position paid off when, running short on provisions, Gustavus Adolphus was forced to withdraw southward on 19 September (N.S.). This left the two major opposing armies in the region in a stalemate which was not to be resolved until November's Battle of Lützen, which resulted in a very costly victory for the Protestant forces.

Gustavus Adolphus attacked the Imperial camp at the Alte Veste (or "Old Fortress")—a derelict castle situated atop a wooded hill. Its ownership would then allow the Swedish guns to dominate the Imperial camp. The Imperials were prepared with trenches and an abatis that stymied the Swedish advance. When the vaunted brigades faltered, much of the cavalry was sent in dismounted. Wallenstein saw an opportunity to strike a blow and sallied his cavalry and cut down many of the exhausted troops. Only the final introduction of the Swedish cavalry reserve averted a complete disaster.

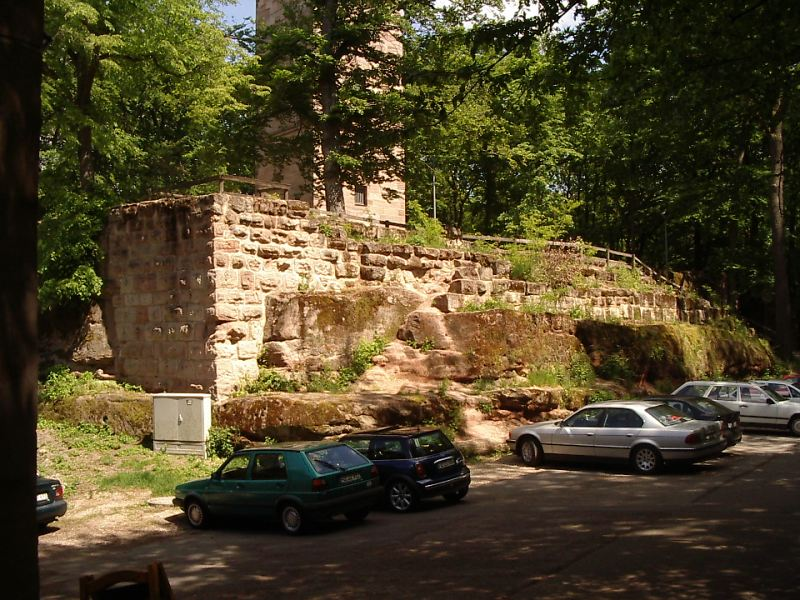
Alte Veste ruins from southwest in 2004

== Result ==
The Swedes had been defeated. The Commander of the Swedish artillery, Lennart Torstenson, was taken prisoner and locked up for nearly a year at Ingolstadt. Several weeks later, lack of supplies led Wallenstein to break camp and move north, allowing the Swedes out of Nuremberg. The two armies met again two months later at the Battle of Lützen, where Gustavus was killed.

The immediate result of the Nuremberg campaign allowed the Habsburgs to advance into Saxony. Fürth had been almost completely destroyed by fire prior to the siege (on 18–19 June), and was largely abandoned. Gustavus Adolphus died in the Battle of Lützen, a devastating battle (for both sides) which took place six weeks later. In the next couple of years, Wallenstein's overcautious battlefield conduct and military errors led to his falling out of favor with the Emperor. Combined with his growing ambition and political intrigue, Wallenstein fell victim to an assassin in 1634 with the Emperor's approval.
