= Siege of Coron (1533–1534) =

Sieges during Ottoman–Habsburg wars

- Part of Ottoman–Habsburg wars
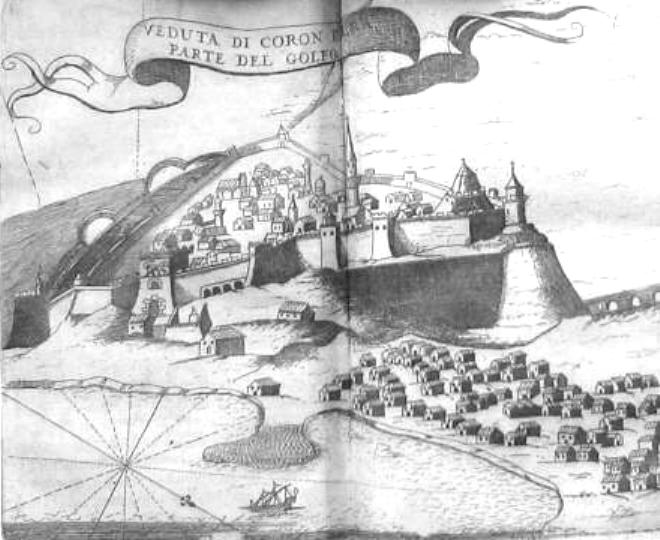
- The fortress of Coron (Koroni) in 1692
Date	1533–1534
Location	Koroni
Result	First siege: Imperial victory Second siege: Ottoman victory

Belligerents
Ottoman Empire; Republic of Venice (first siege)	(Spain) Spanish Empire; Holy Roman Empire; Order of Knights Hospitaller; Papal States; Republic of Genoa; Greek rebels

Commanders and leaders
First siege: Lütfi Pasha; Hassan the Moor; Suleyman of Albania; Second siege: Acomer †	First siege: (Republic of Genoa) Andrea Doria; Bernardo Salviati (Spain) Rodrigo de Machicao (Spain) Jerónimo de Mendoza; Second siege: (Spain) Rodrigo de Machicao †

Strength
First siege: 60 galleys 2 galiots 40 carracks 10 fustas 10,000 soldiers Second siege: 10,000 soldiers	First siege: 27 galleys 30 carracks and galleons 1 brigantine 2,500 soldiers (in fleet); 2,500 soldiers (in Coron); Second siege: 2,500 soldiers

Casualties and losses
1 galley sunk 1 carrack captured 3 ships captured Many ships damaged 400 soldiers killed 300 soldiers captured	1 brigantine sunk 1 carrack damaged Part of two crews captured or killed

The siege of Coron in 1533–1534 was a two-part attempt by the Ottoman Empire the recapture of the fortress of Koroni (Coron) in Messenia, Greece, by the Ottoman Empire, after the fortress was occupied by Emperor Charles V's army in 1532.

The first of the sieges was unsuccessful, with an imperial armada under Andrea Doria routing the Ottoman armada under Lütfi Pasha. The event highlighted the weakness of the Ottoman Navy at that time. Admiral and historian Edmond Jurien de La Gravière considered it one of the most skillful naval operations of the 16th century. After the battle, however, the imperial court saw the place too costly to defend and did not reinforce it, and during a second siege the following year, it was abandoned.

== Background ==
Coron had been a possession of Venice since 1209, but Sultan Bayezid II captured it in 1500. In 1532, the Habsburg emperor Charles V ordered the Genoese admiral Andrea Doria to attack it as a diversion to the campaigns of the Little War in Hungary. Doria conquered the city. Suleyman was especially incensed by the loss of Coron and demanded it back to the Imperial ambassador in Constantinople, Cornelis de Schepper, threatening with demolishing the Church of the Holy Sepulchre of Jerusalem to erect a mosque in its place, offering to hand Algiers back to Spain in exchange. After not receiving an answer, he resolved tried to reconquer it.

The Sultan launched the campaign upon returning to Constantinople in May 1533, ordering sanjakbey Lütfi Pasha to besiege the city by sea with the Ottoman armada while armors from Morea and Negroponte did the same from land.

== First siege ==
=== Arrival of the Ottoman fleet ===
On April 23, Coron was surrounded by sea and land by Lütfi, commanding 60 galleys and fustas. In the city, maestre maestre de campo Jerónimo Mendoza sent a messenger to Viceroy of Naples Pedro de Toledo. In response, Andrea Doria, who had also found out about and had previously promised to relief the city even from his own pocket, started gathering a fleet in Messina. On 27 May, Doria sent his adoptive nephew Cristoforo Pallavicino in the galley Marquesota, carrying supplies and 10.000 écus in payments.

The siege of Coron had lasted enough for the city to almost run out of food, to the point Mendoza and the citizens had to eat their horses and mules. Lütfi sent a messenger to offer an honorable surrender, but Mendoza answered stating that "he and his men would perish before soiling their glory with such a vile cowardice." Some local Greeks deserted from Coron to the Turkish camp, only for ten among them to be skinned and burned to intimidate the defenders, which only had the effect to galvanize their resistance and prevent more desertions. Pallavicino snuck through the Ottoman blockade by putting an awning over his galley and audaciously pretending it to be a Turkish galley. His cargo and news elevated the garrison's morale.

Pallavicino, accompanied now by captain Pedro de Silva, decided to cross the blockade again and return to Messina as a sign of challenge. He would come in his galley every day and maneuvered feigning attacks and escapes he never realized, until the Ottoman ships stopped trying to catch him. On July 4, after feinting an attack on a Turkish cargo ship, he rammed the blockade and escaped into open sea, leaving behind 23 galleys which chased him.

=== Arrival of the relief fleet ===
Meanwhile, Doria gathered in Messina 27 galleys from Genoa, Sicily, Naples, Malta and the Papal States, along with 30 carracks, waiting for Álvaro de Bazán the Elder rendezvoused with other 12 galleys built by him. The Papal galleys were commanded by Bernardo Salviati. In Naples they received 2,500 men from the Tercio de Machicao, captained by Rodrigo de Machicao with Francisco Sarmiento among his lieutenants. It was expected that Alfonso d'Avalos came in command of the land troops, but he was ill with gout and stayed in Naples, being substituted by the viceroy's son Fadrique. Some believed d'Ávalos was abstaining from the mission in protest for having been replaced by Antonio de Leyva in the imperial court in Bologna. Toledo's other son García also joined in the galley squad of Andrea Doria's cousin Antonio.

In early August, Doria sailed off, deciding not to wait more for Bazán due to reports that the Ottomans concentrated ships every day in Coron. Bazán might have been diverted under orders to guard Sicily against any possible attack from the French fleet, by then stationed in Marseille. Leading the fleet in two sections, captained respectively by himself and his other cousin Franco Doria, he captured in route a large Venetian carrack and two cargo ships also from Venice, which turned out to be supplying the Ottoman armada, after which they landed in Zante. From there, Pallavicino found out the Ottoman fleet was located at the other side of Cape Galo, doubled in size compared to the first time he saw it and prepared to ambush the Christian relief fleet. Ottoman reinforcements included a squad under Alexandrian corsair Hassan the Moor, several under Suleyman of Albania and two Venetian galleys.

Learning the Ottoman fleet was waiting for them at the other side of Cape Gallo, Doria formed his fleet in three sections. The first was a spearhead formed by two heavy 60-gun galleons, one belonging to the Doria family and the other to Sicilian corsair Guglielmo Bellomo. Behind them, in the center, Franco Doria would lead the carracks carrying troops from the flagship San Rafael. At the rear guard, the galleys would form a line, with Andrea Doria in the center, Antonio in the left wing and Salviati in the right wing.

=== Naval battle ===
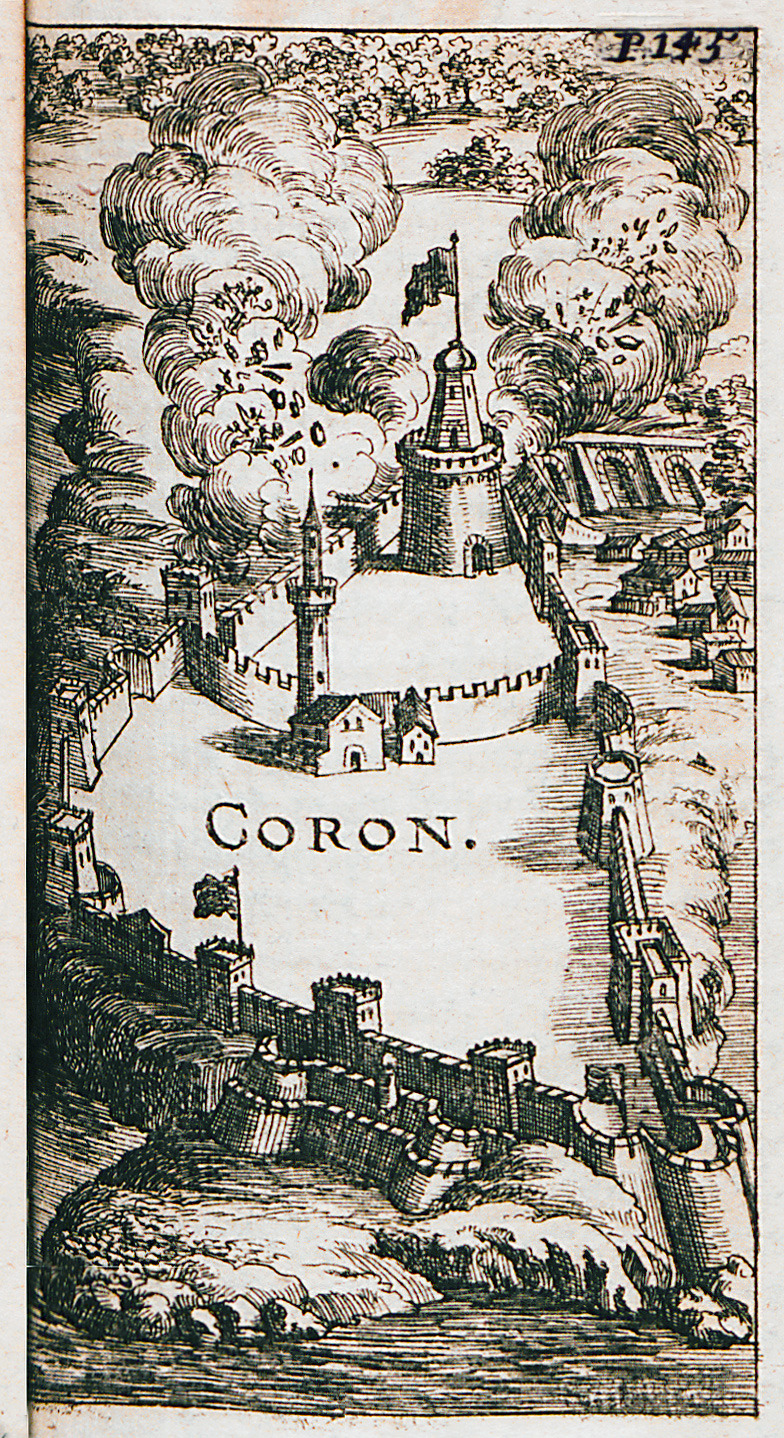
Citadel of Coron.

When the allied fleet turned the cape on August 8, the Ottoman fleet immediately weighed anchor and attacked, causing a first exchange of artillery with the first two galleons. Doria had originally planned for the two vessels to anchor here and overpower the Ottomans with their heavy weaponry, acting as a shield for the rest of the Christian ships to continue the travel behind them. However, his strategy become momentarily undone, as the galleons did not stop the required time and instead continued towards Coron, while the galleys panicked at the enemy fire and became disordered trying to take refuge between the carracks, despite the fact that Ottoman guns were not yet in position to cause them much damage.

Responding to the problem, Franco Doria substituted for the galleons with the San Rafael, shielding the Christians and inflicting heavy damage with its own heavy guns, while Andrea reordered the galleys capitalizing on Lütfi's wariness to attack. When the Ottoman fleet identified the San Rafael as the Imperial flagship, they focused most of their gunfire on her, but the large carrack endured the damage and continued firing from her position, containing the enemy armada as Andrea Doria reformed their convoy behind. When Franco made sure all the Christian ships were out of immediate danger, he ordered to set sail and join the fleet.

Two miles from Coron, a pair of carracks became entangled by their yards and were rendered immobile, falling behind the Christian fleet, which advanced slowly due to unfavorable wind. Part of the embarked contingents, unaccustomed to naval warfare, abandoned them hurriedly, not hearing Doria's orders to bring a rope to tow them, and thus became easy prey for the pursuing Ottoman galleys. Eight galleys surrounded the ships and assaulted them from all angles. One of the carracks, belonging to Sarmiento's company, was taken and most of its crew was killed or captured, while in the other, Alonso de Hermosilla and his tercio company resisted the assault from the aftercastle. Hermosilla, who had brought his concubine to the expedition only for her to be captured in a skiff, fought in the front lines, wielding a montante and taking down numerous enemies.

Meanwhile, Doria, in order to prevent similar accidents, ordered the galleys to tow the rest of the sailing ships and keep them well apart until landing them in Coron. Once done, he returned with the galleys to launch a timely attack on the pursuers, showering the Ottomans with artillery fire and making them withdraw from the two carracks in confusion. Antonio Doria led the recapture of the two ships, killing 400 and capturing 300 Ottoman Janissaries, among them their captain-general Yusuf Aga, in exchange for 90 Christian soldiers and several sailors killed. The two carracks were then towed to safety.

A short exchange between the two armadas happened later that day, which ended when Lütfi, aware of the damage already suffered by the Ottoman fleet, called to withdraw towards Modon. An Ottoman galley was sunk, while the Christians lost a hit brigantine whose crew abandoned it in time. During the battle, Christian slaves mutinied in one of the Turkish ships, captured it and headed for Coron, where they were welcomed.

=== The siege is lifted ===
Meanwhile, the Ottoman land contingent, which numbered by 10,000, had been harassed by Mendoza while the naval combats happened. After watching their outcome, the Turks ultimately abandoned their camp with their supplies and part of his artillery and retreated to Androusa. In the Ottoman armada, Hassan and Suleyman had harsh words for Lütfi, which defended his inaction by stating to have orders to preserve the Ottoman fleet at all costs.

After the battle, Doria allowed Mendoza to return and put Machicao in his place. He freed Aga with gifts in exchange for rescuing thirteen prisoners from the carracks he specified, but the deal was not honored, even after he sent an embassy reiterating it. In his way back, Doria sailed repeatedly around Modon, but not being able to draw the Ottomans out of their fortified harbor, he continued journey, making a stopover in Corfu before returning to Messina. He took with him the 2,800 poorest citizens of Corone to settle in Naples, giving birth to a small Greek community called the Coroneos. Many of them were military men, which Viceroy Pedro de Toledo enlisted.

== Second siege ==
The experience caused deliberations about the strategical importance of Coron, too far away from allied territory and into Ottoman land to defend easily. As in the Ottoman side, some believed Doria had lost a chance to finish the Ottoman armada by attacking directly, even although others noted he had done enough by forcing it to retreat with half of the Turkish ships. Representants of the Papal States, Malta and Venice saw it necessary to keep Coron, as long as the emperor defended itself. Charles attempted to hand it to any of these factions or even France. He also negotiated with Suleyman his desired devolution in exchange for the Peñón of Algiers, which he planned to rebuild, but there was no agreement.

In spring 1544, a new Ottoman attack was launched on the city. Machicao performed a raid on the Turkish camp in Androussa, throwing it into disarray at the cost of being killed. Ottoman general Acomer attempted to return the favor and was also killed. After returning to the city, the Spanish received news that the emperor had decided to abandon Coron and were ordered to evacuate it. The Spanish, along with all the local Greek allies who chose to go, sailed off in five ships, leaving the city to the Ottomans in 1 April 1534.
