= Hannibal von Degenfeld =

German military officer and nobleman (1647/8–1691)

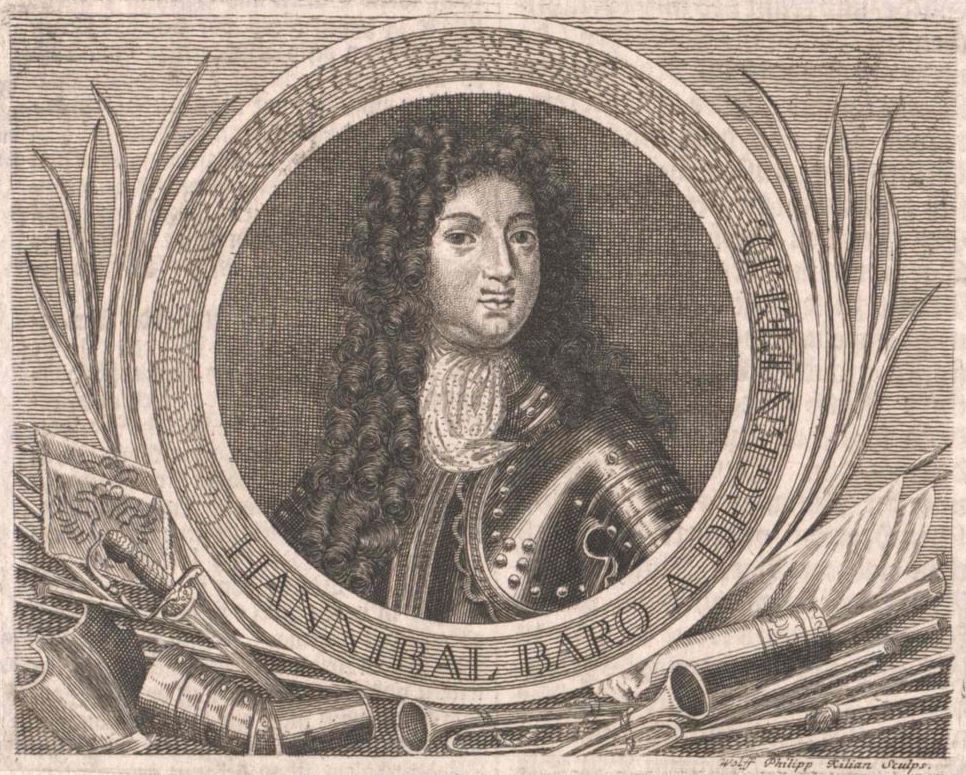
- Engraving of Hannibal von Degenfeld at the time of the Battle of Vienna
- Born: 1647 or 1648
- Died: 12 October 1691; Nauplia
- Burial place: Nauplia
- Relatives: Christoph Martin von Degenfeld (father)
- Military career
- Allegiance: Republic of Venice (1666–1669, 1684–1685, 1691); Dutch Republic (1672–1674); Denmark–Norway (1674–1678); Electorate of Bavaria (1681–1683)
- Conflicts: Siege of Candia, Siege of Groningen (1672), Siege of Wismar (1675), Siege of Marstrand, Battle of Vienna, Battle of Kalamata (1685)

Hannibal Freiherr von Degenfeld (1647/8 – 12 October 1691) was a German military officer and nobleman who served the Venetian army, Bavarian Army, Dutch States Army and Royal Danish Army. He fought in Venetian service during the siege of Candia and the Morean War, and helped to establish the Bavarian army and commanded it during the battle of Vienna. Von Degenfeld also served in the Dutch army during the Franco-Dutch War and the Dano-Norwegian army in the Scanian War.

== Early life and family ==
Born in 1647 or 1648, Hannibal von Degenfeld was the youngest son of Christoph Martin von Degenfeld and Anna Maria Adelmann von Adelmannsfelden. His father was a Protestant military commander from Swabia who served both the Habsburgs and their enemies, the Swedes and French, during the Thirty Years War, and in 1642–1649 was in Venetian service in Dalmatia during the Cretan War against the Ottoman Empire. Hannibal's five brothers followed their father's military career, two of them dying on the battlefield; three of them also entered the service of Venice in the Cretan War. Of his sisters, the most notable was Luise, who married the Raugrave Charles I Louis, Elector Palatine.

== Education and the Siege of Candia ==
After his father's death, like his other siblings, Hannibal von Degenfeld came under the guardianship of his eldest brother, Ferdinand. Degenfeld was sent to the care of a certain Wolfstehl in Heilbronn, who took in and educated many sons of the nobility. There Degenfeld learned French, exercised in knightly manner, and visited the local school. In 1666, having reached adulthood, he was sent to Crete, where his brothers Adolf and Christoph were commanding a Venetian regiment during the Siege of Candia. Degenfeld distinguished himself through bravery and ability, coming to command a company and the rank of major in his brothers' regiment. At the end of the war in 1669, the Venetian Senate awarded him a yearly pension of 500 ducats with the request to return to Venetian service whenever the Republic would call upon him.

== Dutch and Danish service ==
As was usual at the time, Degenfeld often switched service from one master to another, in pursuit of opportunities for swifter advancement. He entered the service of John Frederick, Duke of Brunswick, with the rank of lieutenant colonel, but went over to the Dutch Republic when John Frederick allied himself with France. In the subsequent Franco-Dutch War, Degenfeld participated in the defence of Groningen. In 1674 Degenfeld entered the service of the King of Denmark, Christian V, and formed a new regiment, the Hereditary Prince Frederik's Life Regiment, partly from existing independent companies and partly from new recruits. In 1675 a court-martial condemned him for the regiment's indiscipline, but the king pardoned and restored him to his command.

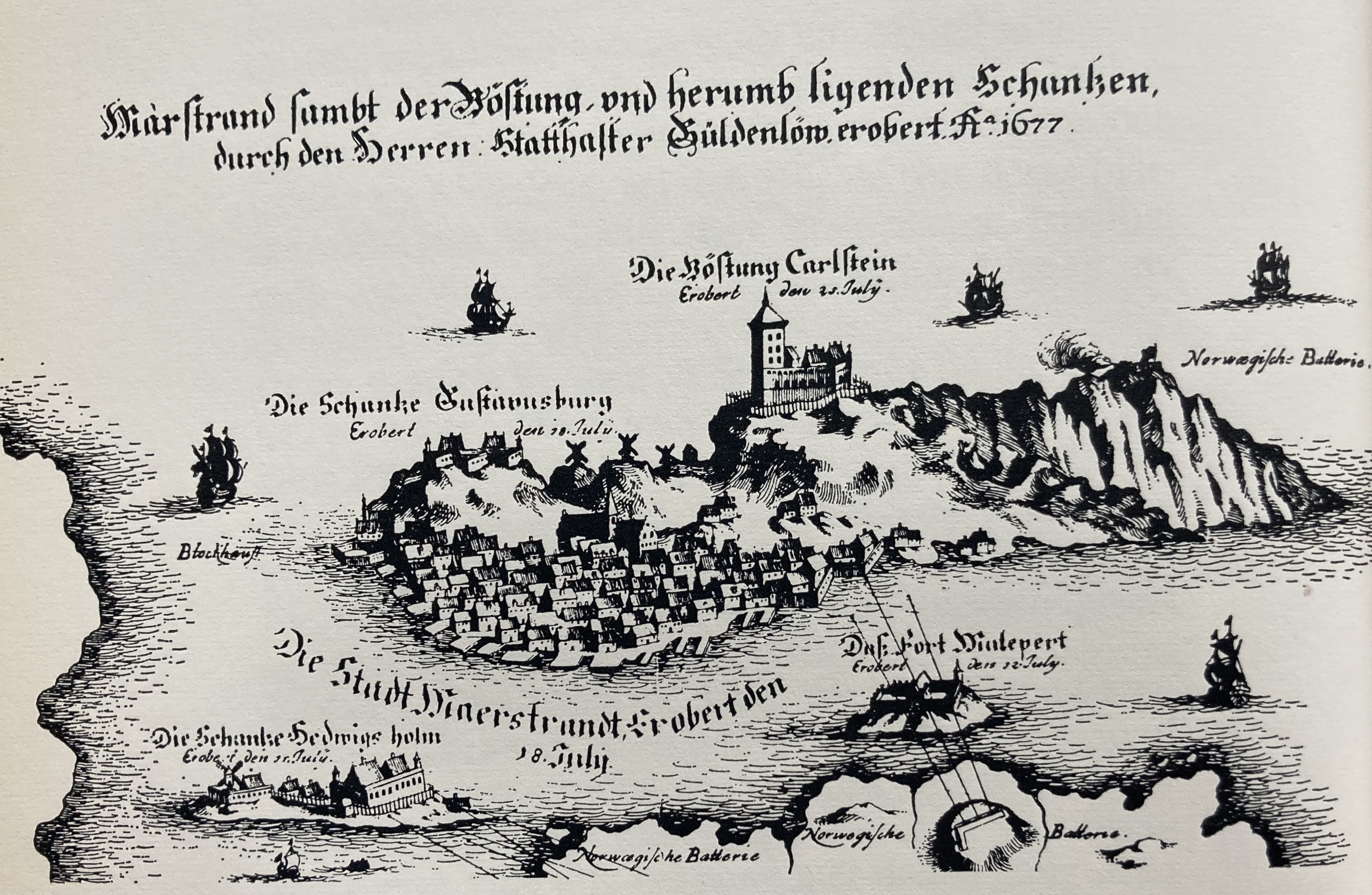
View of the siege of Marstrand in 1677

In the Scanian War he participated in the capture of Wismar and served as commandant of Rostock. Dismissed in 1676, he was restored to service with the rank of major general, conditional on recruiting a regiment. In this Degenfeld was unsuccessful, but was confirmed in his rank and sent with the Norwegian forces under Ulrik Frederik Gyldenløve to Norway. His conduct during the capture of Marstrand was praised, but he soon fell out with Gyldenløve and the other commanders, resigning from the Norwegian army in March 1678. On 19 January 1678, he married Anna Maria Gersdorff (her second of three marriages), with whom he had a daughter, Maria Antonia. Degenfeld returned to Denmark, where he was appointed commandant of the infantry and fortresses in Jutland, as well as governor of Vejle County. He nevertheless applied to resign his commission with the Danish army in the same year, which was granted on New Year's Day 1679, with his simultaneous promotion to the rank of lieutenant general.

== Bavarian service ==
In 1681 Degenfeld entered the service of the Electorate of Bavaria, rising quickly to the rank of field marshal lieutenant and president of the Aulic War Council by 1682. He played a crucial role in the reforms that resulted in the establishment of a standing Bavarian Army under Elector Maximilian II Emanuel. The official Bavarian Army history describes Degenfeld as the reforms' "spiritual father", Maximilian Emanuel's "first counselor and aide", and the "founder of the new army".

Degenfeld took command of a training camp established near Schwabing in 1682, where the Bavarian troops exercised in various forms of warfare. 12 October 1682, the day when the army drew up for the first time in combat formation under Degenfeld's command, was later celebrated as the founding day of the Bavarian Army. During his tenure, Degenfeld formed the artillery as a separate corps and introduced modern six-pounder regimental guns, improved the army's logistical train, and introduced hand grenades and grenadiers. Degenfeld also commanded one of the four Bavarian regiments of foot that were constituted at that time, the "Regiment Degenfeld", the future Royal Bavarian 2nd Infantry Regiment "Crown Prince".

In 1683 Degenfeld commanded the Bavarian forces sent to the relief of the Ottoman siege of Vienna, though nominally headed by Elector Maximilian Emanuel himself. After the relief of Vienna, and as a result of perceived slights from the elector, who now viewed himself as a war leader on his own account, Degenfeld requested to be released from Bavarian service, which was granted on 12 October.

== Venetian service in the Morea ==
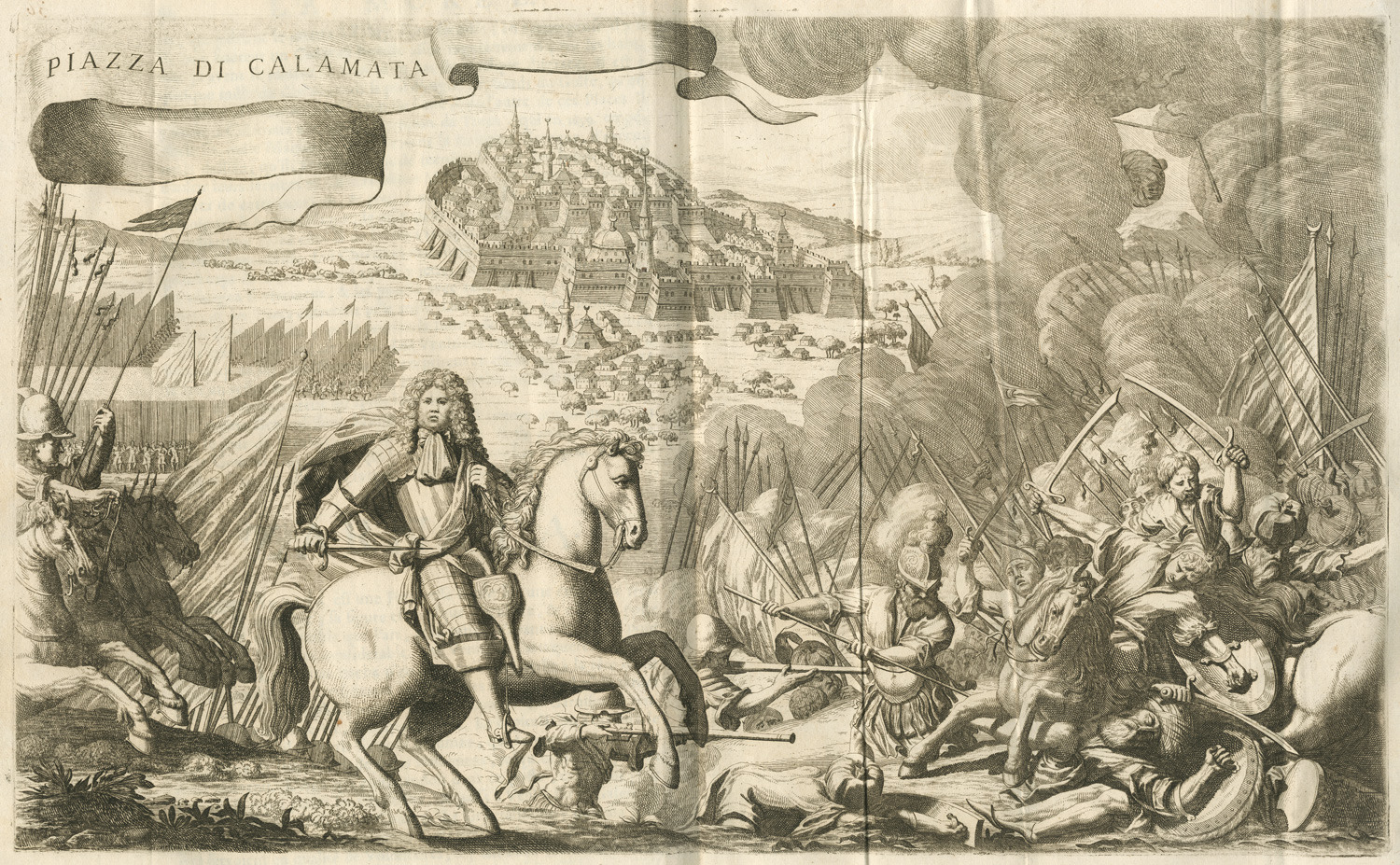
Engraving commemorating the victory at Kalamata, by Vincenzo Coronelli

In 1684 Degenfeld accepted a request from the Republic of Venice to re-enter its service. He was given command of the ground forces being assembled for a campaign against the Ottomans in Greece, under the overall command of the Venetian Francesco Morosini as Captain General of the Sea. Degenfeld arrived in Greece in 1685, in time for the first operations in the Morea, with some 3,000 Saxon troops sent to reinforce the Venetian army. He assumed command of the Venetian forces in the Morea and led them in the capture of the castle of Zarnata and in the subsequent Battle of Kalamata, where he defeated the Ottomans under the Kapudan Pasha. This led to the capture of the fortresses of Passavas and Kelefa, which removed Ottoman control from the Mani Peninsula.

Due to ongoing disagreements with Morosini, Degenfeld took his leave the following year, and was replaced by Otto Wilhelm Königsmarck. However, after the death of Königsmarck and Girolamo Corner of disease, and the ascent of Morosini to the dogeship, Degenfeld was recalled to service as captain-general in spring 1691. On 3 August he left Venice with new troops and arrived in Nauplia on 4 September, where he fell ill and died on 12 October. He was accorded a state funeral and buried in the local cathedral.

== Sources ==
- Braun, Rainer, ed. (1987). Bayern und seine Armee: Eine Ausstellung des Bayerischen Hauptstaatsarchivs aus den Beständen des Kriegsarchivs, München, 9. Juli-30. August 1987 (in German). Generaldirektion der Staatlichen Archive Bayerns. ISBN 3921635101.
- Pfister, Albert; von Landmann, Carl (1877). "Degenfeld, Christoph Martin Freiherr von". Allgemeine Deutsche Biographie, herausgegeben von der Historischen Kommission bei der Bayerischen Akademie der Wissenschaften. Allgemeine Deutsche Biographie (in German). Vol. 5. pp. 23–26.
- Rockstroh, K. C. (2011). "Hannibal v. Degenfeld". Dansk Biografisk Leksikon (in Danish) (3rd ed.).
- Staudinger, Karl (1904). Geschichte des bayerischen Heeres: Geschichte des kurbayerischen Heeres unter Kurfürst Max II. Emanuel 1680–1726 (in German). Munich: J. Lindauer.
- Thürheim, Andreas (1881). Christoph Martin, Freiherr von Degenfeld, General der Venezianer, General-Gouverneur von Dalmazien und Albanien, und dessen Söhne (1600—1733) (in German). Vienna: Wilhelm Braumüller.
- Wheatcroft, Andrew (2008). The Enemy at the Gate: Habsburgs, Ottomans and the Battle for Europe. London: Pimlico. ISBN 978-1-40908682-6.
