= Koroni =

Town in Messenia, Greece

Koroni Κορώνη
- Municipal unit
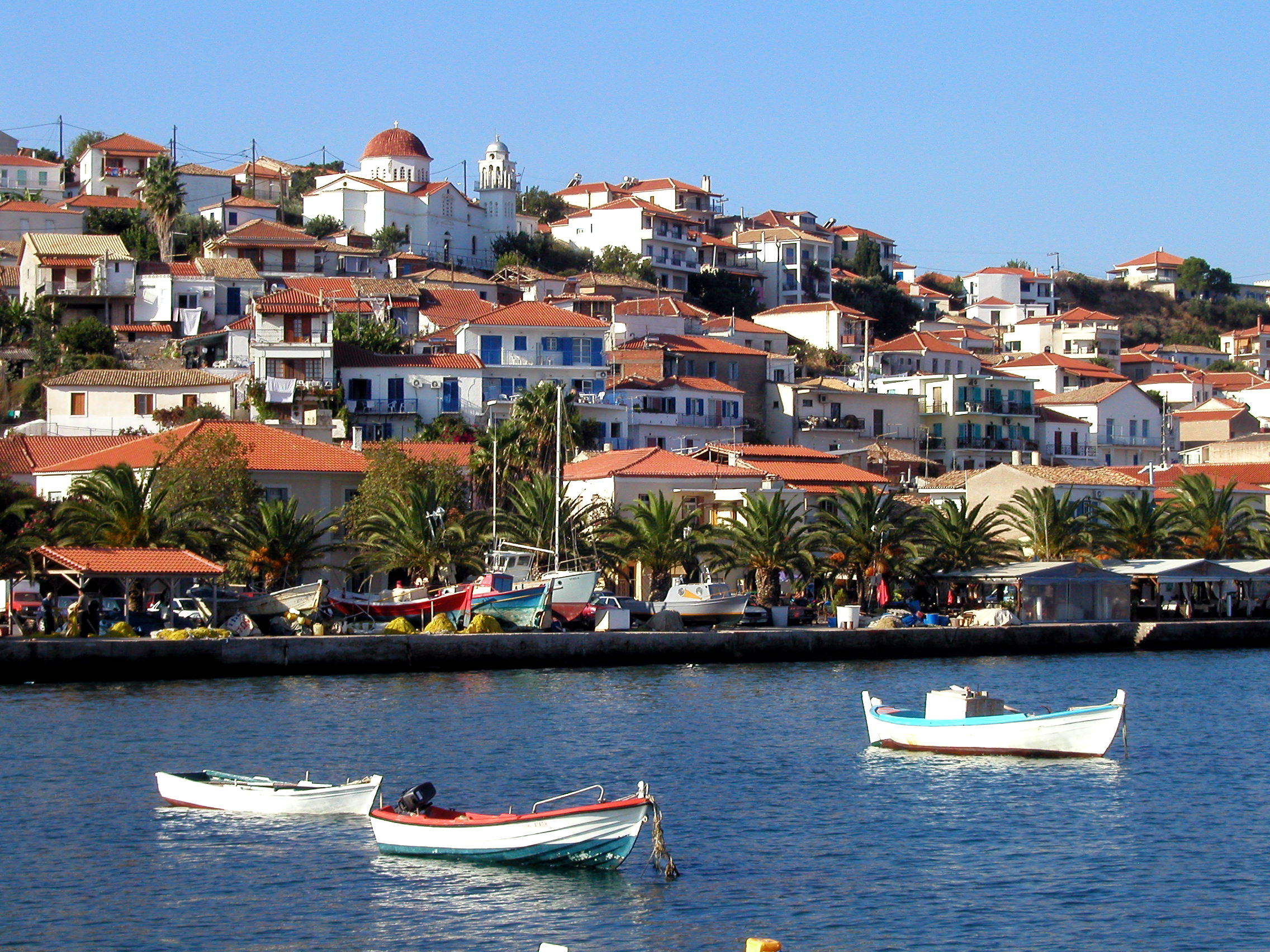

- Location within the regional unit

- Location within Greece
- Coordinates: 36°47′41.61″N 21°57′46.43″E
- Country: Greece
- Administrative region: Peloponnese
- Regional unit: Messenia
- Municipality: Pylos-Nestor

Area
  - Municipal unit: 105.163 km^{2} (40.604 sq mi)
- Elevation: 20 m (66 ft)

Population (2021)
  - Municipal unit: 3,600
  - Municipal unit density: 34/km^{2} (89/sq mi)
  - Community: 1,193
- Time zone: UTC+2 (EET)
  - Summer (DST): UTC+3 (EEST)
- Vehicle registration: KM
- Website: www.korone.gr

Koroni or Corone (Greek: Κορώνη) is a town and a former municipality in Messenia, Peloponnese, Greece. Since the 2011 local government reform it is part of the municipality Pylos-Nestor, of which it is a municipal unit. Known as Corone by the Venetians and Ottomans, the town of Koroni (pop. 1,193 in 2021) sits on the southwest peninsula of the Peloponnese on the Gulf of Messinia in southern Greece, 56 km (35 mi) by road southwest of Kalamata. The town is nestled on a hill below a Venetian castle and reaches to the edge of the gulf. The town was the seat of the former municipality of Koróni, which has a land area of 105 km^{2} (41 sq mi) and a population of 3,600 (2021 census). The municipal unit consists of the communities Akritochori, Charakopio, Chrysokellaria, Falanthi, Kaplani, Kompoi, Koroni, Vasilitsi, Vounaria and Iamia. It also includes the uninhabited island of Venétiko.

== History ==
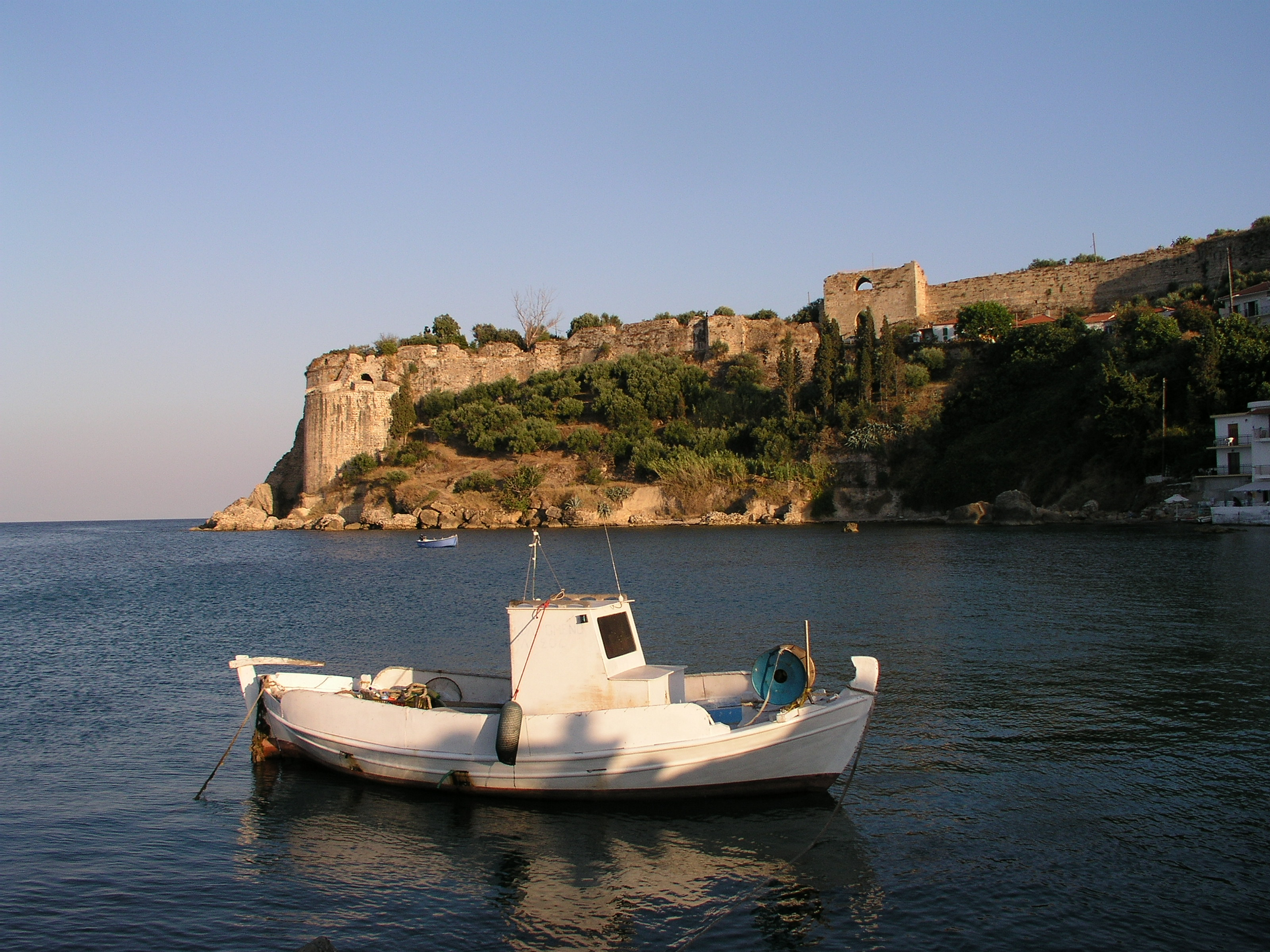
View of the castle

The town was founded in ancient times. The 2nd century Greek geographer Pausanias in his book Messeniaka reports the original location of Koroni at modern Petalidi, a town a few kilometers north of Koroni. He also reports many temples of Greek gods and a copper statue of Zeus. In the centuries that followed, the town of Koroni moved to its current location, where the ancient town of Asini once stood. In the 6th and 7th centuries AD, the Byzantines built a fortress there.

The town appears for the first time as a bishopric in the Notitiae Episcopatuum of the Byzantine Emperor Leo VI the Wise, in which it appears as a suffragan of the See of Patras. Surviving seals give the names of some of its Greek bishops. The Greek eparchy was suppressed in the 19th century as part of an ecclesiastical reorganization after Greece gained its independence.

=== Venetian period ===
Following the fall of Constantinople to the Fourth Crusade in 1204, the Partitio Romaniae assigned most of the Peloponnese to the Republic of Venice, but the Venetians moved slowly to claim it, and the peninsula swiftly passed to the Frankish crusaders under William of Champlitte, who established the Principality of Achaea. The fortress of Koroni was initially given to Champlitte's chief lieutenant, Geoffrey of Villehardouin. It was not until 1206 or 1207, that a Venetian fleet under Premarini and the son of Doge Enrico Dandolo took the Messenian peninsula and Koroni with its neighbouring Methoni from Champlitte's men. Venetian possession of the two fortresses were recognized by Geoffrey of Villehardouin, by now Prince of Achaea, in the Treaty of Sapienza in June 1209.

The Venetian period lasted for three centuries, during which time Koroni and Methoni, or Coron and Modon—the first Venetian possessions on the Greek mainland—became, in the words of a Venetian document, "the receptacle and special nest of all our galleys, ships, and vessels on their way to the Levant", and by virtue of their position controlling the Levantine trade were known as "the chief eyes of the Republic". The town flourished as a waystation of merchants and pilgrims to the Holy Land. Koroni in particular was famous for its cochineal, from which crimson dyes were made, and for the Venetian engineers' expertise in siege engines, which was much in demand by the princes of Frankish Greece in their wars. Of the two, Koroni was the more important: when the two captains of the fortresses were increased to three towards the end of the 13th century, the two resided in Koroni, and in emergencies a bailo resided there as an extraordinary consul. During this period Koroni became the seat of bishops of the Latin Church. As the Catholics imitated the pre-existing Byzantine ecclesiastical structure, the Latin bishop of Koroni remained a suffragan of the Latin Archbishop of Patras. One of its bishops, Angelo Correr, later became Pope Gregory XII. No longer a residential Catholic bishopric, Corone is today listed by the Catholic Church as a titular see.

In the mid-14th century, the two Venetian colonies suffered greatly from the Black Death, so that it was necessary to send a fresh batch of colonists from home, and the franchise was extended to all the inhabitants, except the Jews. The two fortresses began to be governed by a series of minutely detailed Statutes and Capitulations issued by the metropolitan government, containing such clauses as a regulation that forbade the Venetian garrison to wear beards, so as to distinguish them from the local Greeks. Unlike other Latin rulers in Greece, the Venetians allowed the Greek Orthodox bishops to reside in their sees alongside their Catholic counterparts, but in the latter half of the 14th century, there are reports of mistreatment of the Greek population, which fled from Venetian territory to the Franks of Achaea.

In the early 15th century, as the Principality of Achaea gradually collapsed, the Venetians expanded their territory in Messenia: Navarino was taken over in 1417, and by 1439 had constructed or taken over six further castles between Navarino and Methoni and Koroni to secure her extended possession. The first seaborne Ottoman attack on Koroni took place in 1428, and after the Ottoman conquest of the Despotate of the Morea in 1460, the Venetian domains shared a border with Ottoman territory. Koroni fell to the Ottomans in 1500, during the Second Ottoman–Venetian War (1499–1503): Sultan Bayezid II stormed Methoni, after which Koroni and Navarino surrendered (15 or 17 August 1500).

=== Ottoman and modern period ===
Supported by the local population, the town was retaken by admiral Andrea Doria in 1532, but in the spring of 1533 the Ottomans laid siege to it. Doria was able to relieve the town, prompting Sultan Suleyman the Magnificent to call upon the services of the corsair captain Hayreddin Barbarossa. Barbarossa was aided by the outbreak of plague among the garrison and a particularly harsh winter, and in 1534 the Spanish garrison surrendered the fortress and sailed for Italy. Albanian and Greeks inhabitants who participated in the revolt travelled with Doria and populated several settlements in the Kingdom of Naples, including San Chirico Nuovo, Ginestra and Maschito, where the Arbëreshë dialect is still spoken.

In the first half of the 16th century, Koroni was initially a kaza within the sub-province (sanjak) of Methoni and the seat of a kadi. The fortress itself and the surrounding territory were an imperial fief (hass-i hümayun). Its annual revenue was 162,081 akçes, which, according to Theodore Spandounes, were granted along with the revenue of Methoni to Mecca.

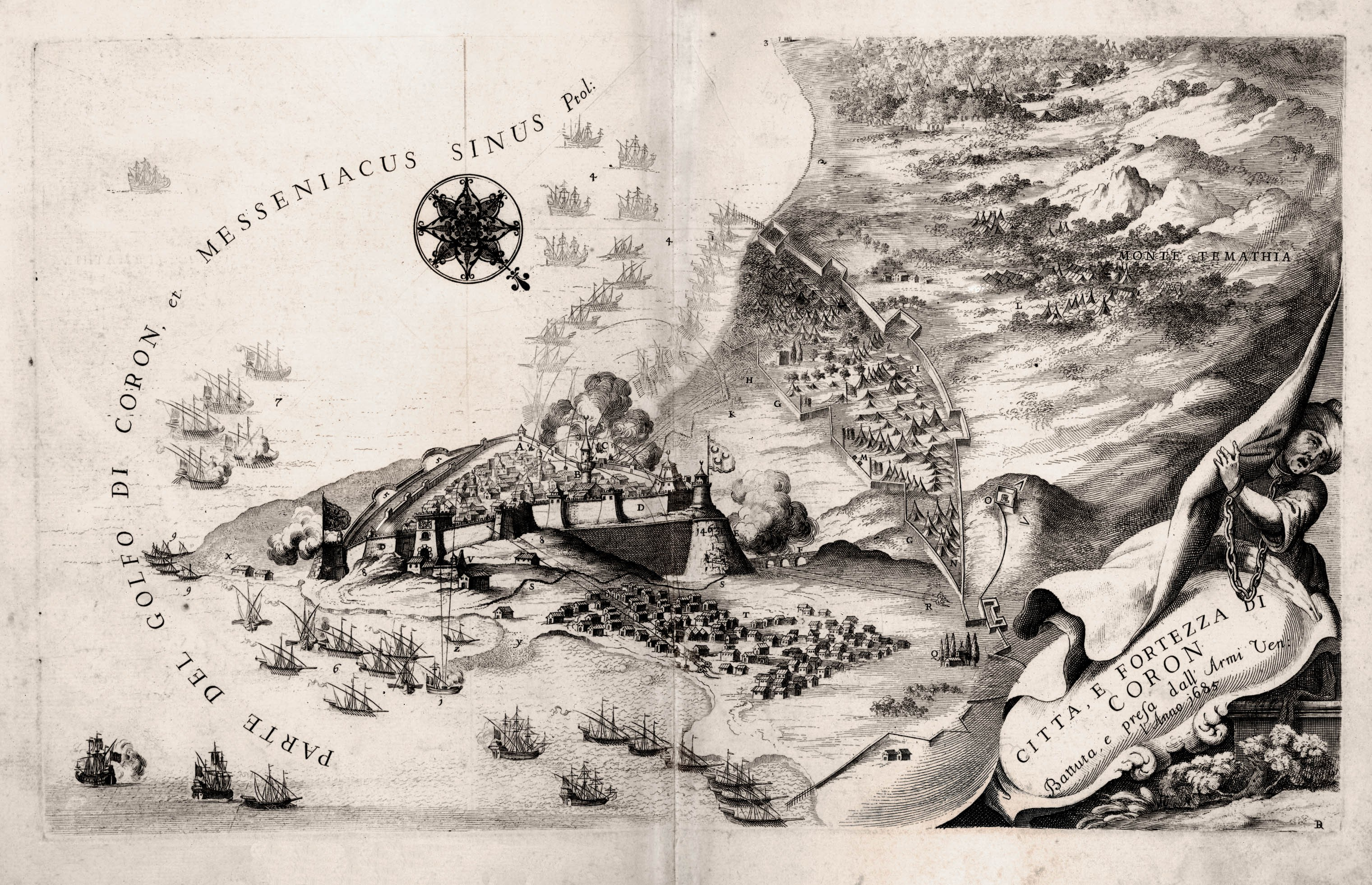
Venetian map of the siege of Koroni during the Morean War

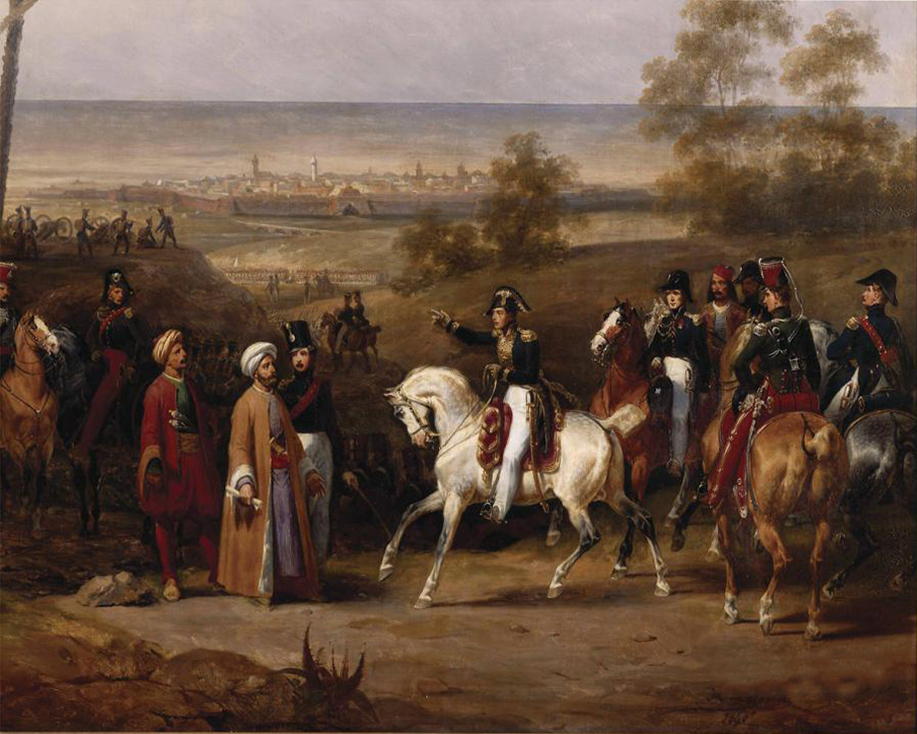
Capture of Koroni during the Morea expedition by General Sebastiani (Hippolyte Lecomte).

In 1582, the fortress was part of the Sanjak of Mezistre, and reportedly contained 300 Christian and 10 Jewish households, while the Muslim population was limited to the officials and a 300-strong garrison, which apparently remained constant over the entire Ottoman period. According to the 17th-century traveller Evliya Çelebi, Koroni was the seat of a separate sanjak, within either the Morea Eyalet or the Eyalet of the Archipelago. The 17th-century French traveller Jean-Baptiste Tavernier reports that its bey (governor) had to provide a galley for the Ottoman navy. Later it was part of the Sanjak of the Morea, and is once more attested as a separate sanjak by François Pouqueville in the late 18th century.

In the Morean War, Koroni was the first place the Venetians targeted during their conquest of the Peloponnese, capturing it after a siege (25 June – 7 August 1685). It remained in Venetian hands as part of the "Kingdom of the Morea" until the entire peninsula was recaptured by the Ottomans in 1715, during the Seventh Ottoman–Venetian War. During the 18th century, the town declined: its harbour was reported as blocked and ruinous already at the turn of the previous century, but it continued to export silk and olive-oil; until the 1770s, four French merchant houses were active there. By 1805, the English traveller William Martin Leake reported that trade had stopped, that the port offered only "insecure anchorage", and that the Janissary garrison abused the local population.

Koroni became part of the modern Greek state in 1828, when it was liberated by the French General Nicolas Joseph Maison.

== Rocket launch site ==
Between 1966 and 1989 a facility for launching sounding rockets was established near the town. The first launches were performed from Koroni on May 20, 1966 for investigation an annular solar eclipse. These rockets reached an altitude of 114 kilometers. From 1972 to 1989 several Russian meteorological rockets of M-100 type were launched. They reached altitudes up to 95 kilometers. In total 371 rockets were launched.

== Climate ==
Koroni has a hot-summer mediterranean climate (Köppen Csa) with mild, rainy winters and hot, dry summers. The average annual temperature is 17.3 °C or 63.2 °F. About 737 mm or 29.0 inches of precipitation falls annually.
