= 2025 European and Mediterranean wildfires =

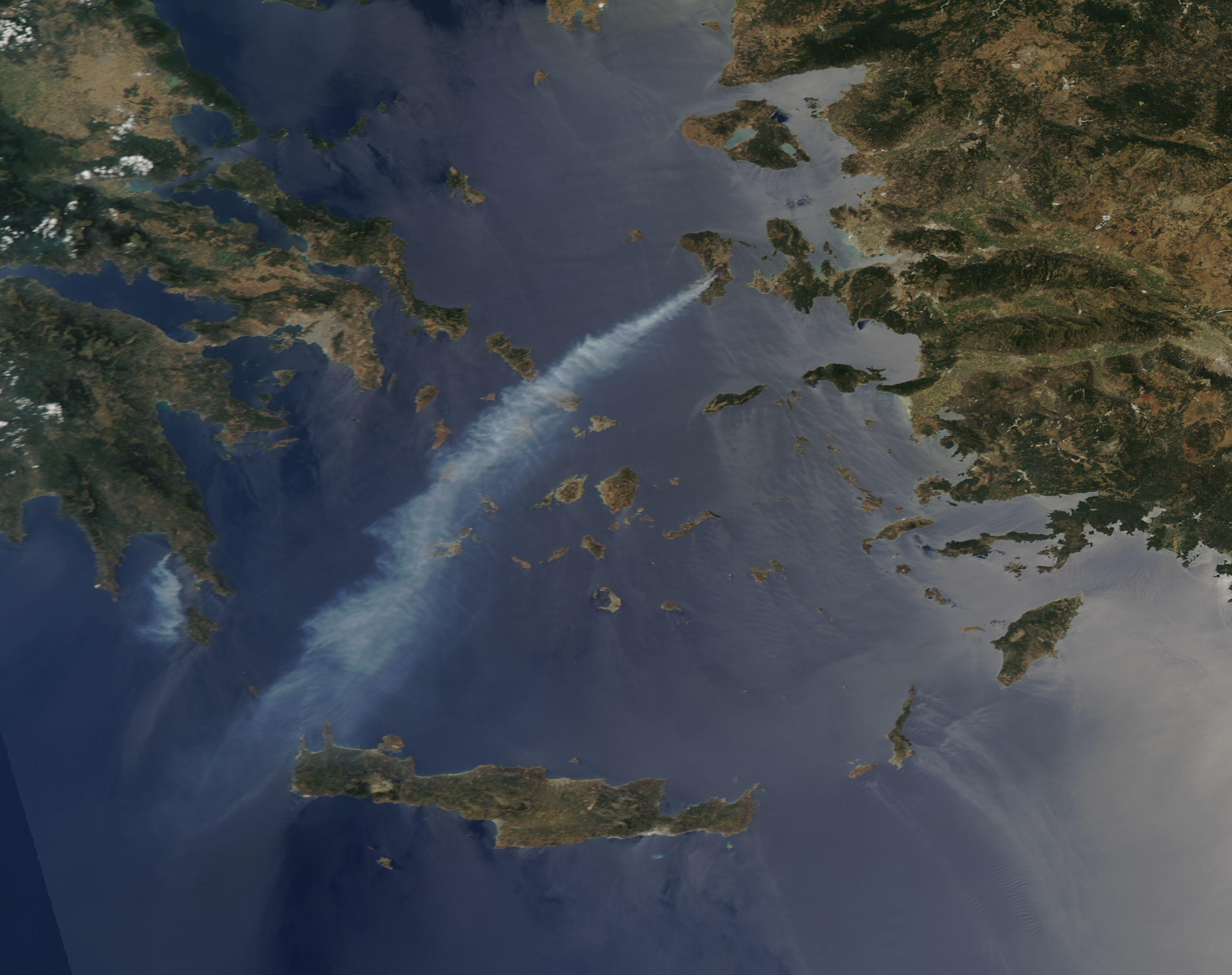
- A satellite image of smoke from a wildfire on the Greek island of Chios
- Location: Europe

Statistics
- Total fires: 7,774 (Note: Areas ≥30 hectares)
- Total area: 2,035,972 ha (5,031,000 acres)

Impacts
- Deaths: 30+ (Note: Turkey: 17 Spain: 8 Cyprus: 2 France: 1 Albania: 1 Portugal: 1)
- Injuries: 266+ (Note: France: 137+ Spain: 48+ Portugal: 19+ Turkey: 15+ Greece: 12+ Syria: 12+ Albania: 11+ Cyprus: 8+ Germany: 2+ Croatia: >1 United Kingdom: 1+)
- Evacuated: 105,610+ (Note: Turkey: 55,500+ Spain: 40,000+ Greece: 7,500+ Albania: 2,000+ France: 400+ Germany: 100+ Portugal: 60+ United Kingdom: 50+)

In 2025, parts of Europe were affected by wildfires, with Mediterranean countries affected the most. The fires were exacerbated by a record-breaking heatwave which saw extreme temperatures across the continent throughout June and July. At least 30 people were killed by fires, hundreds injured and over a hundred thousand evacuated; among the worst-hit countries were Ukraine, Turkey, Portugal, Spain, Cyprus, Albania, Montenegro and Kosovo.

Combined burnt area between 1 January – 21 August exceeded 1 million hectares within European Union countries—marking the highest total in over two decades, since the start of joint digital recordkeeping. The running total surpassed the previous peak recorded in 2017. The vast majority of this territory was burnt after 5 August, occurring in the Iberian Peninsula.

== Summary ==
=== Map ===
Map of 2025 European wildfires (≥ 100 ha) (map data)

=== List ===
Wildfires in Europe (Fires approx. 30 ha or larger)
Country	Burned area (ha)	Annual avg. (ha)	Top perc. of territory (% area)	Number of fires	Annual avg.
Ukraine	596,595	88,167	1.03%	4,134	434
Spain	393,079	79,570	0.78%	350	204
Portugal	278,387	96,360	3.02%	197	204
Turkey	153,949	48,225		438	152
Romania	129,443	22,889	0.54%	491	100
Italy	84,348	55,799		612	295
Albania	59,888	23,969	2.19%	131	84
United Kingdom	47,879	6,783		181	32
Greece	47,819	50,318		69	58
Bosnia and Herzegovina	37,632	33,181	0.74%	128	91
France	36,895	13,588		256	84
Bulgaria	32,752	12,311		92	35
North Macedonia	31,338	16,216	1.24%	82	41
Serbia	27,882	7,065		191	41
Montenegro	27,658	15,755	2.06%	133	59
Kosovo	16,773	4,174	1.54%	115	25
Cyprus	13,527	1,815	1.42%	7	6
Germany	5,475	672		38	6
Ireland	4,355	3,139		31	12
Croatia	3,380	13,765		22	37
Norway	2,412	881		27	5
Sweden	1,079	2,182		12	7
Belgium	668	213		3	1
Hungary	666	737		6	4
Austria	431	89		2	.7
Finland	407	187		9	2
Slovakia	362	27		1	0
Poland	295	368		4	1
Denmark	255	73		6	1
Netherlands	170	98		4	1
Slovenia	143	328		1	1
Latvia	30	168		1	.8
Estonia	—N/a	29		0	.5
Lithuania	—N/a	31		0	.4
Switzerland	—N/a	20		0	.2
Czech Republic	—N/a	83		0	.1
Malta	—N/a	3		0	.1
Moldova	—N/a	4		0	.1
Andorra	—N/a	0		0	.0
Luxembourg	—N/a	0		0	.0
Iceland	—N/a	0		0	.0
Total	2,035,972	599,282	—	7,774	2,026

=== European Union countries ===
As of 23 September 2025, 2,076 fires are detected and 1,015,084 ha (2,508,327 acres) are burnt in the European Union since the beginning of the year. Scientists say that the conflagration in Portugal and Spain was caused by their governments failing to control excess ignitable flora in vacant plots.

== By country ==
=== Albania ===
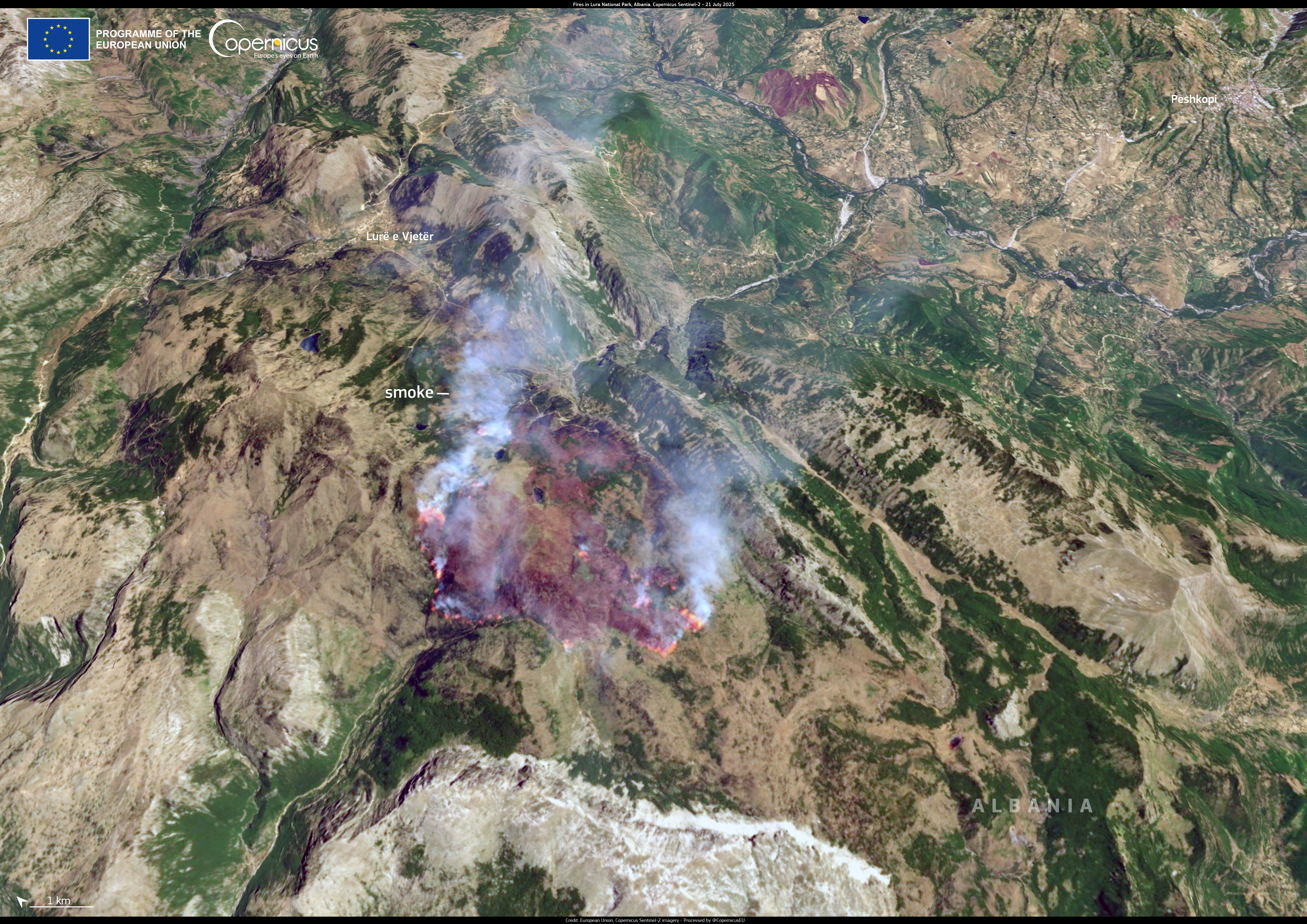
A wildfire in the Lurë-Dejë Mountain National Park on 21 July

On 1 July, a fire started in the municipality of Finiq after a pine tree fell on power lines. On 6 July, Greece sent two Canadair CL-415 aircraft to the area to assist with firefighting efforts.

On 25 July, a wildfire started near Delvinë and prompted the evacuation of around 2,000 people in six villages. At least three people were injured and numerous buildings were destroyed, including a church and ten houses.

As of 12 August, the wildfires killed one person and injured eight. Officials reported that in the last 24 hours, 37 fires have been reported, with 30 still remaining active.

=== Bulgaria ===
On 27 July, it was reported that firefighters were tackling wildfires at almost 100 locations across the country, including one in the Pirin Mountains which burned thousands of acres. Fires in Kozarevo and Simitli destroyed several houses, whilst a fire along the Miloslavska planina mountain range almost destroyed the village of Rani Lug and spread into neighbouring Serbia.

=== Croatia ===
On 21 June, a large wildfire started in Pisak and quickly spread to nearby villages. The fire burned around 290 ha (720 acres) before it was brought under control the following day by around 200 firefighters. Numerous citizens and tourists were evacuated and part of the Adriatic Highway was closed; a number of citizens and firefighters were injured and several houses were destroyed in Marušići, Mimice and Pisak. In Marušići, an olive oil refinery, one of the largest in the country, was also destroyed.

=== Cyprus ===
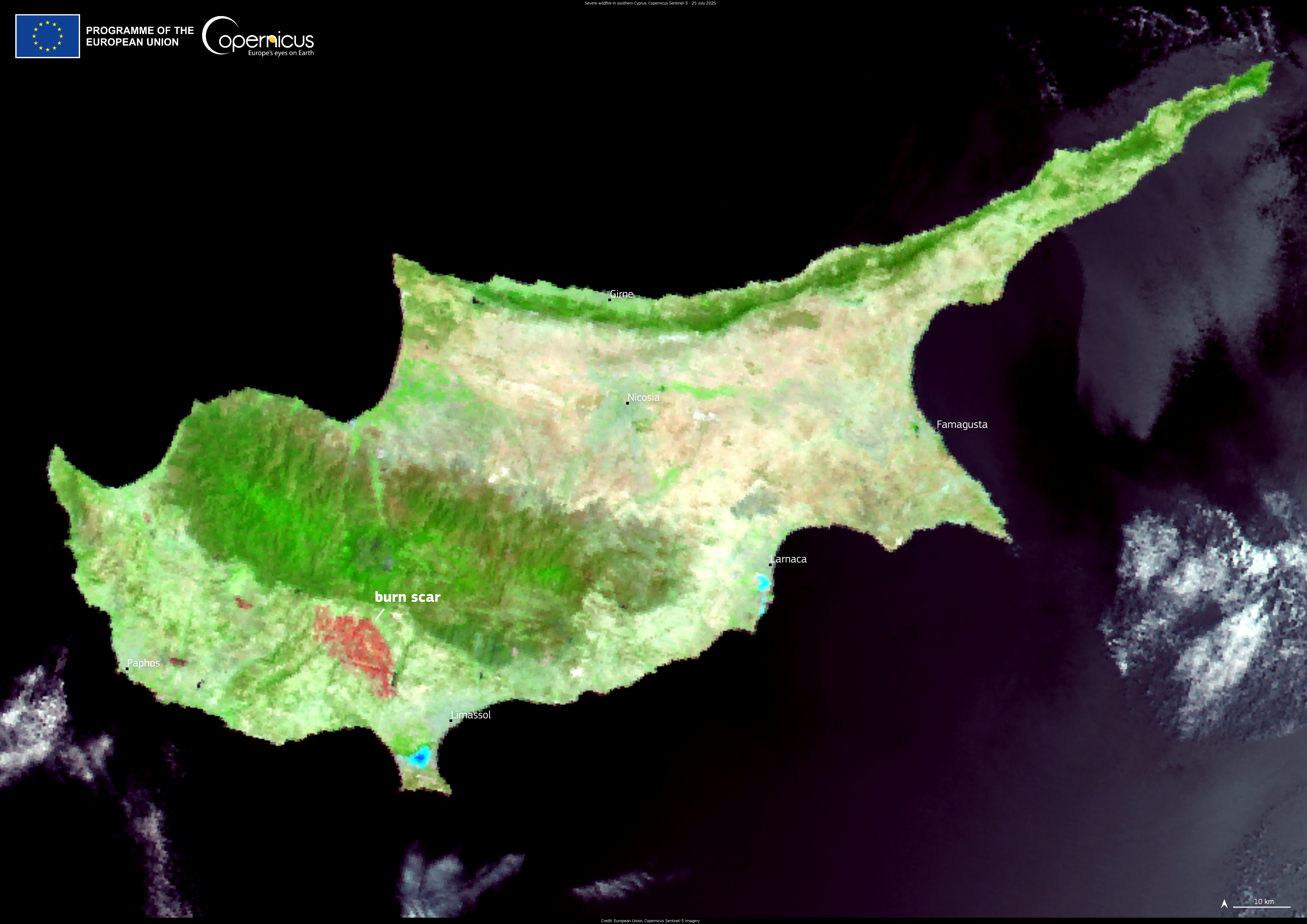
The burn scar from the fire in southern Cyprus on 25 July

On 7 July, a wildfire in the valley between Galataria and Pentalia in Paphos District spread to over 150 ha (370 acres) and destroyed ancient olive trees, with one firefighter being hospitalised for smoke inhalation. On 13 July, a fire in Steni spread to 75 ha (190 acres) before it was brought under control; firefighting efforts involved eight aircraft and led to a power outage which affected several areas.

On 23 July, two bodies were found in a burnt out car along the B8 road after a wildfire broke out in the village of Malia in Limassol District. The fire spread to over 120 km^{2} (46 sq mi) and forced the evacuation of 14 villages as it was tackled by over 250 firefighters, 75 fire engines and 14 aircraft, with support from Israel, Jordan, Lebanon and Spain. Reports stated seven people were in hospital for smoke inhalation and burns and at least 20 homes were destroyed in Lofou. At least 100 livestock were killed in the fire as 14 livestock farms were within the burned area; a total of 13,667 acres (5,531 ha) of agricultural land was destroyed. The same day, amid efforts to fight the blaze in Limassol, another fire was seen in a rubbish dump in Agia Marinouda which spread to the fields beyond; the village of Agia Varvara was evacuated before the fire was brought under control, having burned over 150 ha (370 acres). The wildfire was caused by a carelessly discarded cigarette coming into contact with dry vegetation by the side of a mountain road.

=== France ===
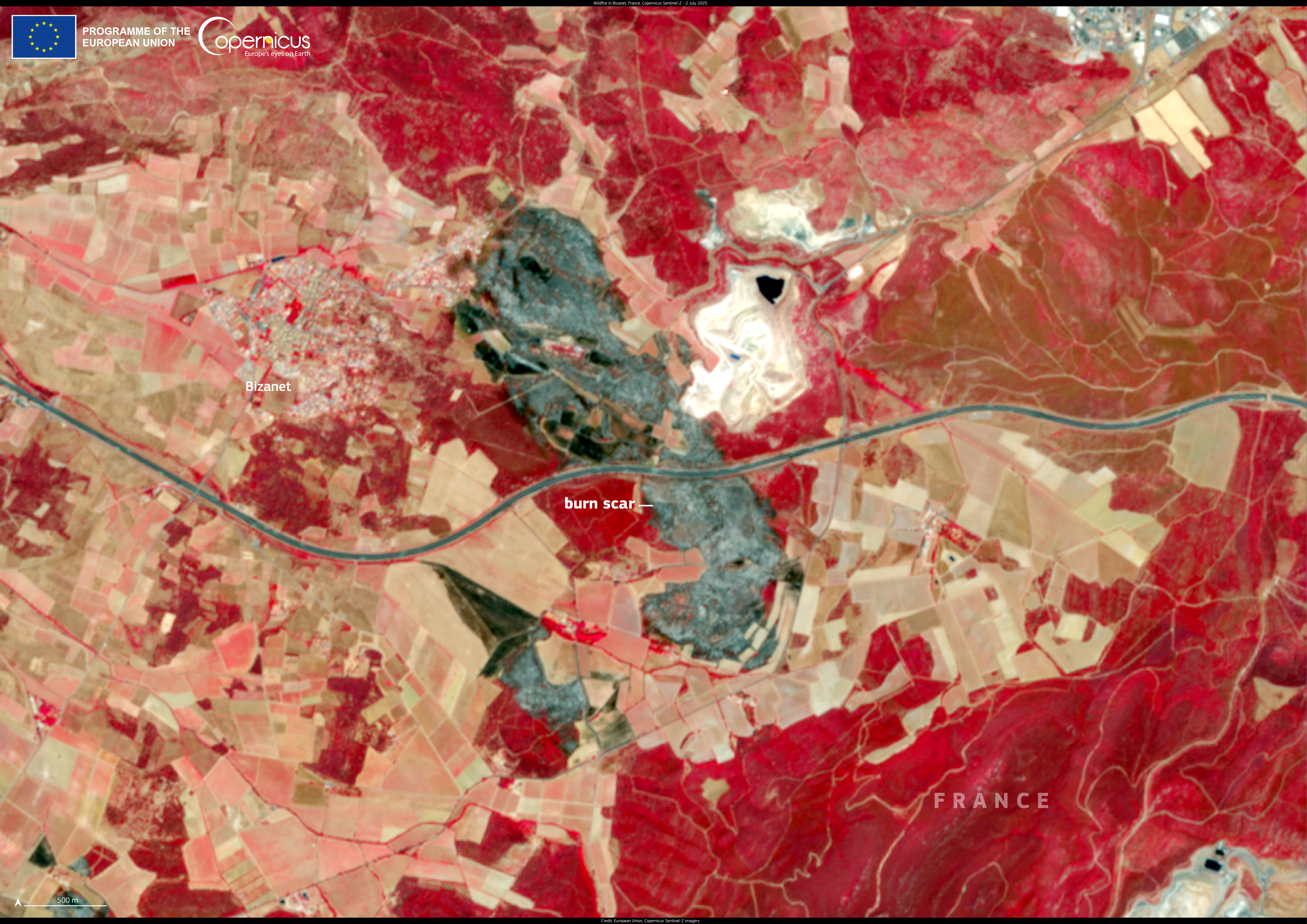
The burn scar of the Corbières fire

On 29 June, a large fire started in Corbières due to a poorly extinguished barbeque and spread to over 400 ha (990 acres). The A61 autoroute was closed and homes and a campsite were evacuated as over 600 firefighters, nine of whom were injured, fought the blaze and brought it under control the following day.

On 7 July, a fire started near Narbonne and spread to over 2,000 ha (4,900 acres), forcing the evacuation of a hamlet and the closure of the A9 autoroute. By 9 July, several houses had been damaged whilst around 1,070 firefighters fought the flames, five of whom had been injured. The fire also destroyed a stable, killing a number of horses.

On 8 July, a wildfire started in Les Pennes-Mirabeau and spread rapidly, prompting the closure of the A50 and A55 autoroutes and Marseille Provence Airport as train services heading north and west of Marseille were suspended. Marseille's 15th arrondissement was evacuated and operations at the airport resumed after 9:30 p.m. once Canadair aircraft were grounded for the night. Around 600 people lost power due to the fire in the 16th arrondissement and Les Pennes-Mirabeau, whilst 70 people were displaced from a nursing home in the latter. The Minister of the Interior, Bruno Retailleau, said that some 110 people had been injured during the fire, which had affected 63 homes and destroyed at least 10. He also said over 800 firefighters were tackling the blaze, at least nine of whom had been injured.

On 5 August, a wildfire broke out near Ribaute in Aude and spread to 17,000 ha (42,000 acres) in 72 hours, making it the largest fire in France since 1949. Over 2,000 firefighters with 500 vehicles fought the blaze alongside gendarmerie and army personnel as one woman was killed and 25 people injured, of which 19 were firefighters. Dozens of homes and farm buildings were destroyed, including in Jonquières, where the mayor said 80% of the village was burnt. Around 1,500 ha of vineyards are estimated as burnt or secondarily harmed. The region has suffered repeated droughts since 2023, although prosecutors are investigating the possibility of deliberate arson.

=== Germany ===
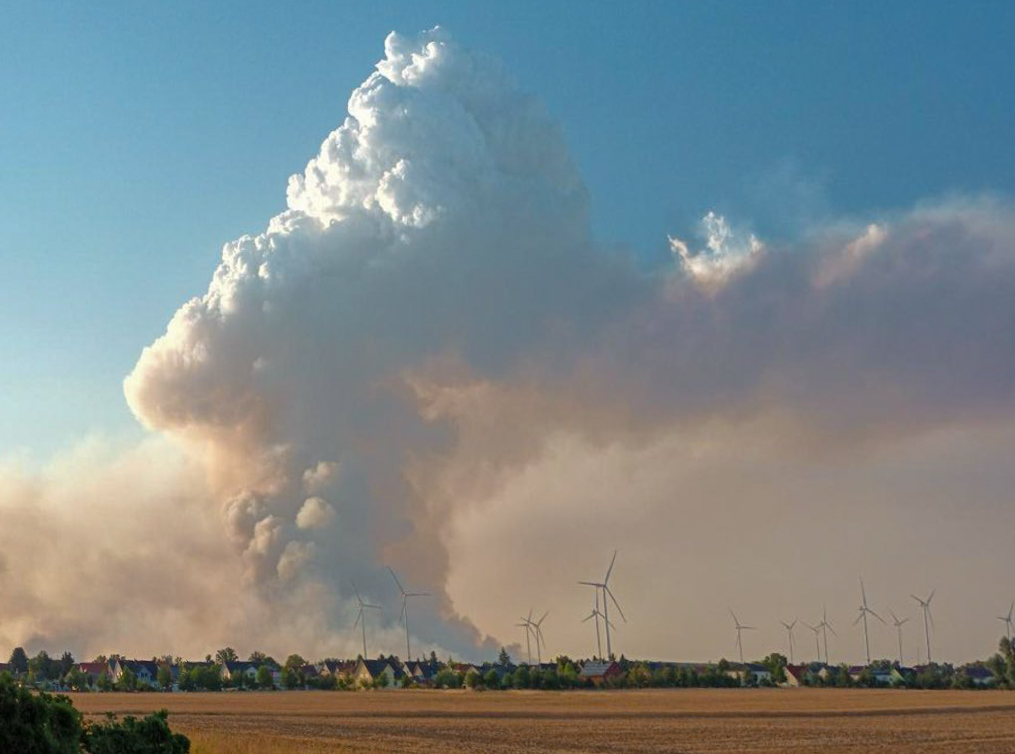
Smoke from the Gohrischheide fire on 3 July

On 1 July, a wildfire started in Gohrischheide on the border of Saxony and Brandenburg, leading to the evacuation of over 100 people as two firefighters were injured. Another fire started in Thuringia the following day in Saalfelder Höhe and grew to become the largest in the state since 1993. By 4 July, a total of 1,000 firefighters had been deployed between the two sites and several communities including Gröditz were under a disaster alert.

=== Greece ===
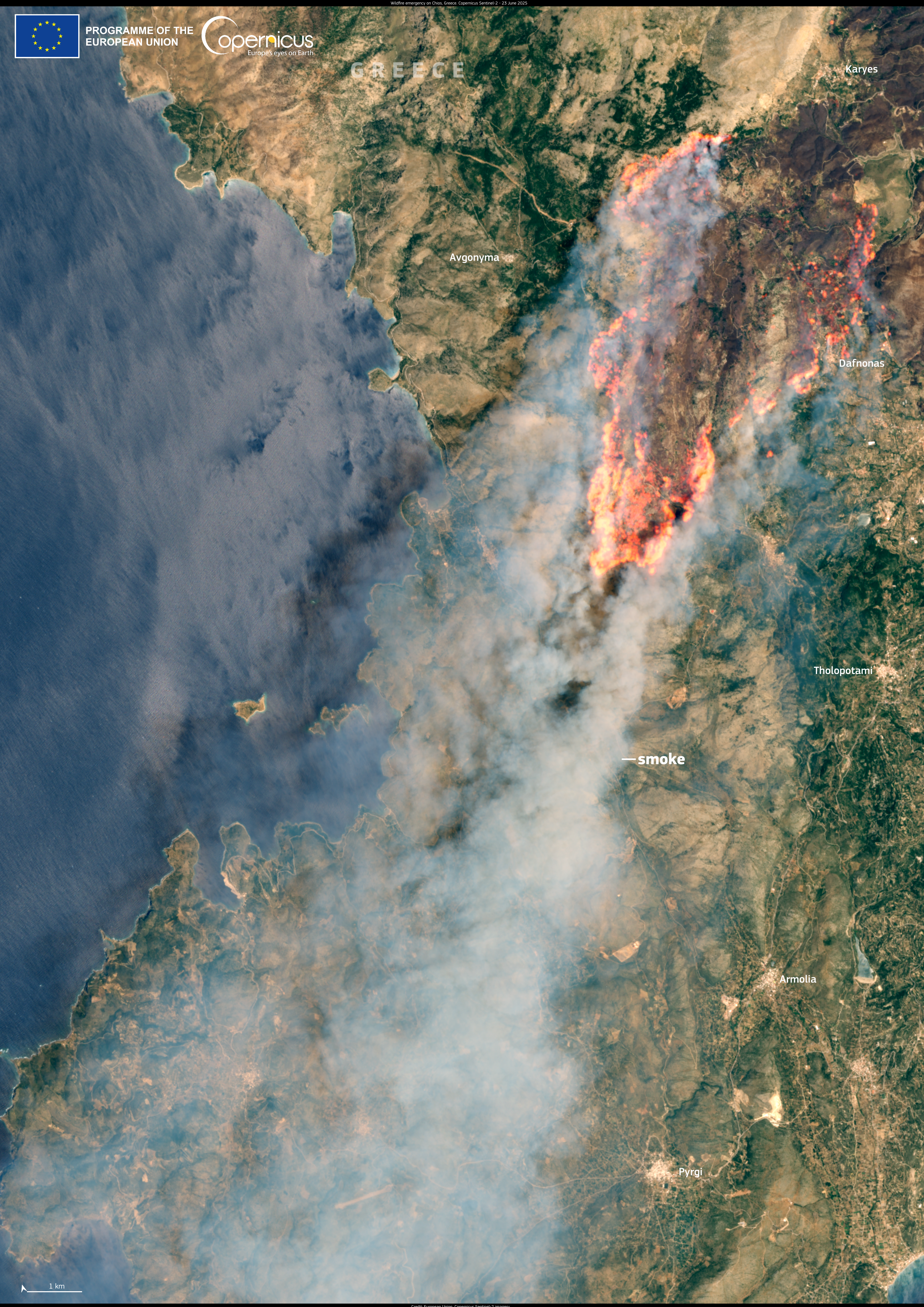
A large wildfire on the Greek island of Chios, taken by the Sentinel-2 satellite on 23 June

On 22 June, five fires started on the island of Chios, leading to the evacuation of 17 communities as a state of emergency was declared; it was tackled by 444 firefighters and several aircraft as it burned over 10,000 acres (4,000 ha), with a woman being arrested for unintentional arson. Another large fire destroyed at least 20 homes amidst high winds and temperatures of up to 40 °C (104 °F) in the towns of Palaia Fokaia and Thymari, with over 1,000 people being evacuated and at least 40 having to be rescued by police.

On 3 July, a wildfire which started the previous day near Ierapetra on the island of Crete forced the evacuation of over 1,500 people as it was fought by around 230 firefighters and 46 vehicles; around 5,000 tourists were also believed to have evacuated independently. Another fire in the Chalkidiki region was being fought by 160 firefighters and 49 vehicles. A fire in Rafina forced the evacuation of four settlements and damaged at least six houses as it spread to Pikermi and Spata.

On 4 July, a wildfire started near Koropi and damaged some houses, leading to the evacuation of Agios Dimitrios as 120 firefighters fought the fire, supported by 30 vehicles, eight aircraft and eight helicopters. A large fire broke out on the island of Evia and forced the evacuation of Limnionas and Tsakaioi as over 160 firefighters fought the blaze; it spread to 10,000 acres (4,000 ha) and a 52-year-old was arrested the following day.

On 7 July, a wildfire started in Kozani and spread close to the University of Western Macedonia, prompting its evacuation; three aircraft and a helicopter were involved as the fire reached some houses.

On 22 July, a firefighting helicopter crashed into the sea near Elefsina during efforts to extinguish a wildfire in Aspropyrgos; all three crew were rescued and taken to hospital. A fire broke out in Corinthia and spread rapidly, prompting the evacuation of a number of settlements as seven houses were destroyed in Kastania. By 24 July, two firefighters had been injured as 360 firefighters, 75 vehicles and 25 aircraft tackled the blaze; two people were arrested in connection to the fire, which spread to over 12,000 acres (4,900 ha).

On 26 July, firefighters were tackling blazes across the country, including in Attica, Evia, Kythira and Messenia. In Attica, at least five people were taken to hospital as Drosopigi and Kryoneri were evacuated; in the latter flames reached the main square and destroyed some houses. In Evia, a number of settlements were evacuated as a fire spread rapidly and left two firefighters injured, as well as causing power outages in four villages. In Kythira, a fire which started in Pitsinades spread rapidly and led to the evacuation of many settlements. In Messenia, a fire led to the evacuation of four settlements and burned a number of houses in Kryoneri. The following day, data from Copernicus found that 55,540 acres (22,480 ha) had been burned in Attica, Chania, Evia and Kythira and Messenia, with the fires there burning 2,269 acres (918 ha), 7,078 acres (2,864 ha), 12,811 acres (5,184 ha), 26,880 acres (10,880 ha) and 6,502 acres (2,631 ha) respectively.

On 8 August, an elderly person was found dead inside a burned house in Keratea following a wildfire. On August 13, within a 48-hour period, 152 new fires were reported nationwide. Major outbreaks occurred near Patras, Zakynthos, Vonitsa, and Chios. More than 7,500 people were evacuated across affected regions. Nearly 5,000 firefighters and 62 aircraft were deployed to contain the flames. At least 13 firefighters were injured; many civilians suffered smoke inhalation. Destruction included residential buildings, agricultural land, a cement factory near Patras, and sections of rail lines.

=== Italy ===
In Italy, from the beginning of the year to 31 July, there have been 851 wildfires that have burned 56,263 hectares. Fires that in 99% of cases are caused by arsonists. However, counteractions, prevention, and monitoring efforts, including those using surveillance drones, are increasingly widespread and effective. In some cases, arsonists are caught red-handed and arrested.

On 8 August, a wildfire broke out in the Vesuvius National Park, affecting the towns of Terzigno, Ottaviano and San Giuseppe Vesuviano. Over 400 hectares of Mediterranean scrub and maritime pines were destroyed, and the fire remained under control for several days by the Italian Civil Protection and firefighters. Canadair firefighting aircraft, helicopters, and surveillance drones were involved in controlling the fire on Vesuvius. The wildfire on Vesuvius was caused by arson and investigators are looking into the arsonists. On August 14, 2025, the fire emergency was declared over, but the paths on the trails of the Vesuvius National Park remain closed pending further checks and clean-ups. The wildfire was finally put out by heavy rains, including hail, which hit Naples and the surrounding province.

On 15 August, a large wildfire broke out in the province of Salerno, particularly in Pastena and Giovi.

=== Montenegro ===
On 2 July, a wildfire broke out near Gornje Crkvice in Nikšić Municipality, close to the border with Bosnia's Republika Srpska, and threatened a number of homes. Firefighters were reportedly still fighting the blaze on 4 July.

On 11 August, a wildfire broke out near Podgorica. A soldier died after a water tanker deployed to combat the fire overturned the next day.

=== Morocco ===
In August, wildfires broke out near Bab Taza and Tétouan.

=== Netherlands ===
On 3 April, a large wildfire broke out in the Veluwe near Ede during a Ministry of Defence exercise involving smoke grenades. The fire spread quickly due to strong winds, leading to around 500 firefighters attending the blaze as roads were closed and a small number of houses were evacuated; a total of 130 ha (320 acres) was burned. On 12 April, a wildfire occurred in De Loonse en Drunense Duinen National Park, burning 42 ha (100 acres) before it was brought under control by over 100 firefighters.

=== North Macedonia ===
On 13 August, a wildfire broke out at a nature reserve outside Skopje.

=== Portugal ===
On 29 June, a fire broke out in a forested area of Castelo Branco; by midnight it was being fought by 175 personnel, 57 vehicles and seven aircraft. Another fire in a forested area of Torres Novas was fought by 107 firefighters and 32 vehicles.

On 1 August, it was reported that 19 people had been injured by wildfires in three districts which prompted the evacuation of two villages and the deployment of over 1,800 firefighters. The most severe fires were in the districts of Aveiro, Porto and Viana do Castelo, which were being fought by 441, 231 and 622 firefighters respectively; the latter, which began on 26 July in the Peneda-Gerês National Park (PNPG), led to the evacuation of at least 60 people. The PNPG fire was concluded on 4 August after burning 7,550 ha (18,700 acres), of which 5,786 ha (14,300 acres) were in the park itself.

On 2 August, a fire started in Trancoso. The fire reached conclusion stage twice with subsequent reignitions. As of 12 August, it has continued for 10 days with nearly 700 firefighters on scene on the tenth day.

The Portuguese government activated the European Union Civil Protection Mechanism (UCPM) on 15 August, the same day the first fatality was reported in Vila Franca do Deão. The victim was identified as Carlos Damaso, the town's former mayor who was initially reported missing. A vehicular crash in which firefighters were responding to a fire in Covilhã left a 44 year old firefighter dead and four other firefighters injured.

On 24 August, the largest fire since records have been kept in Portugal was concluded. The fire began 13 August in Piódão and consumed 64,721 ha (159,930 acres). Allegedly the cause was lightning from a dry thunderstorm.

=== Spain ===
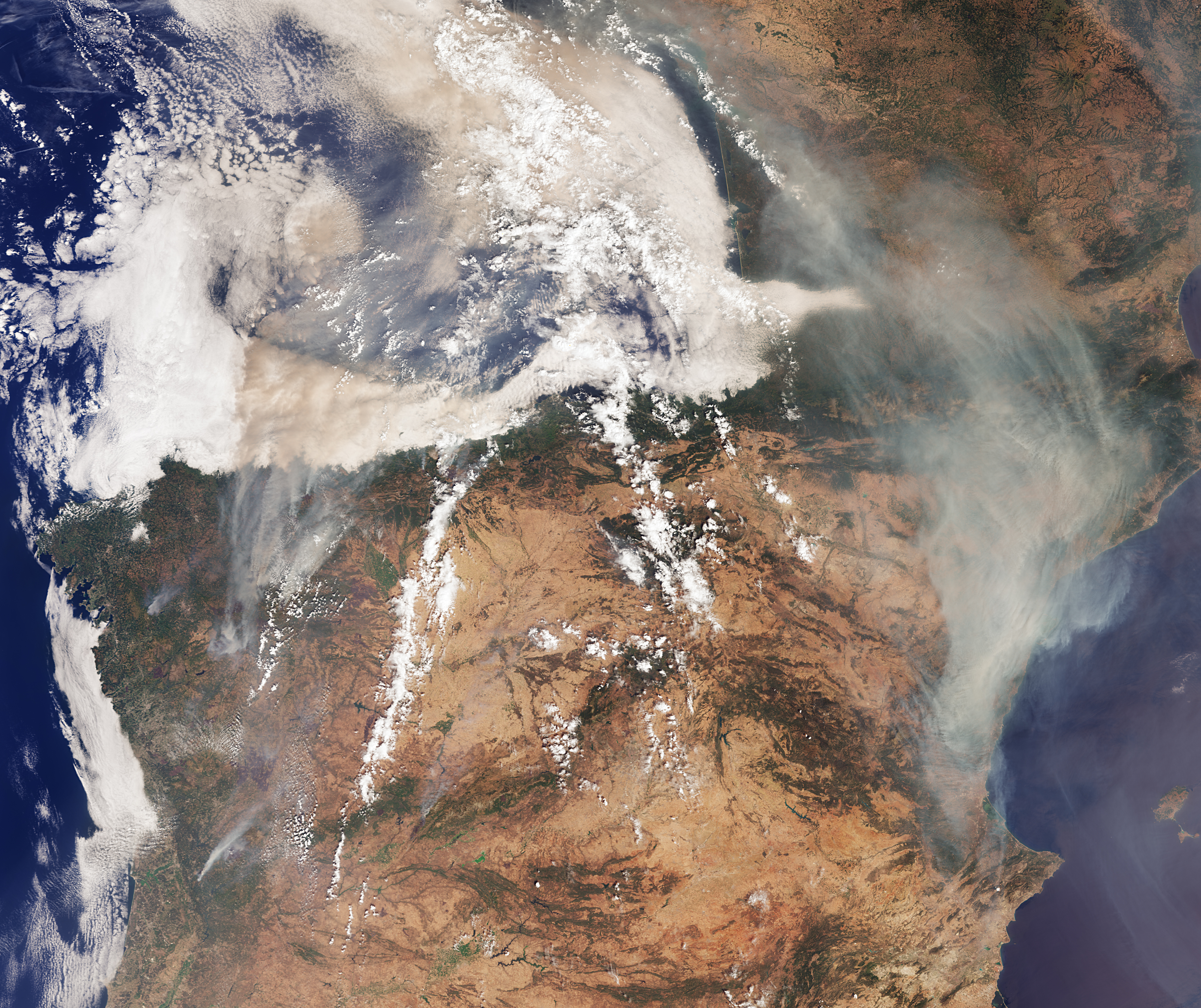
A satellite image of smoke billowing from wildfires in the Iberian Peninsula on 17 August

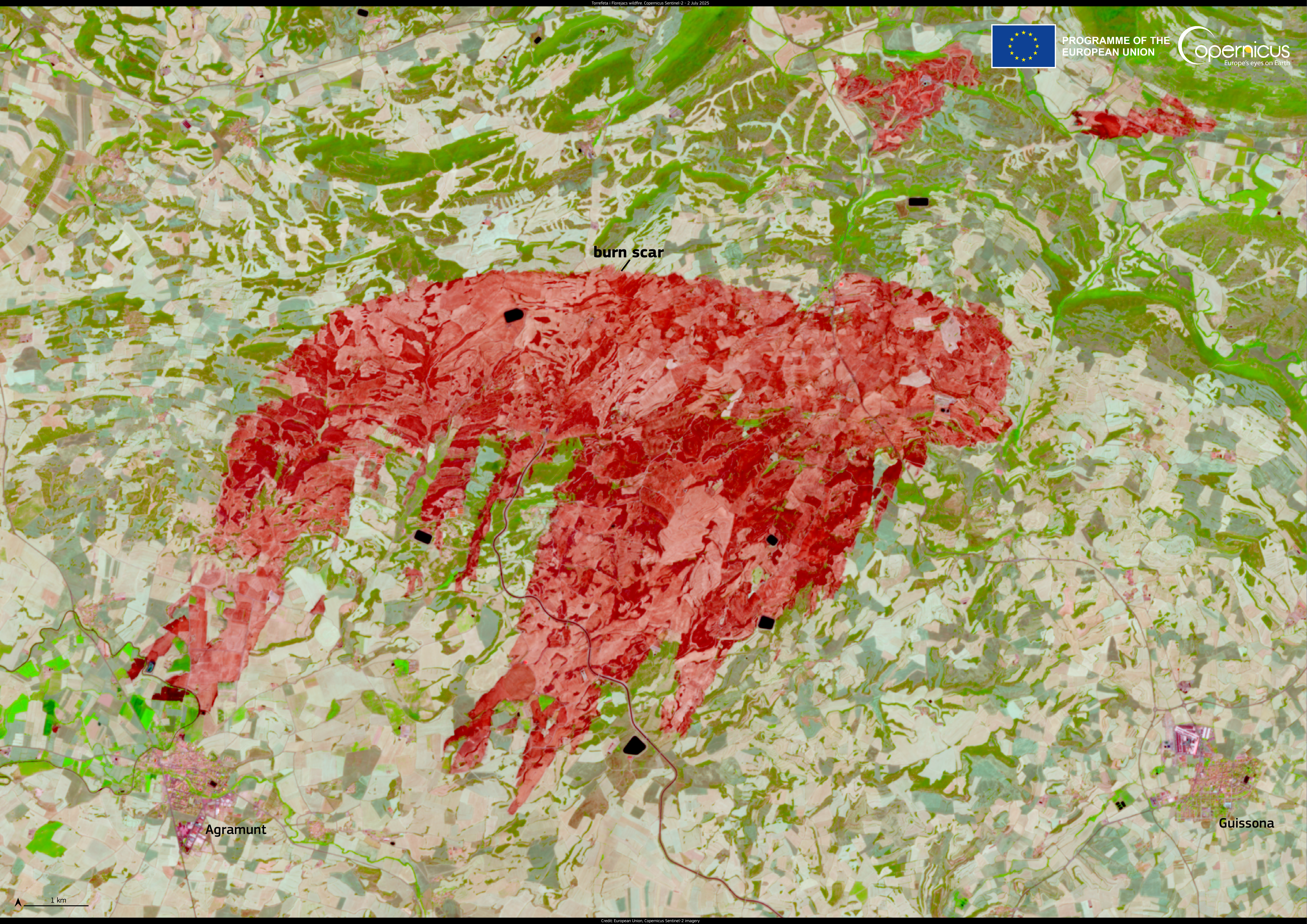
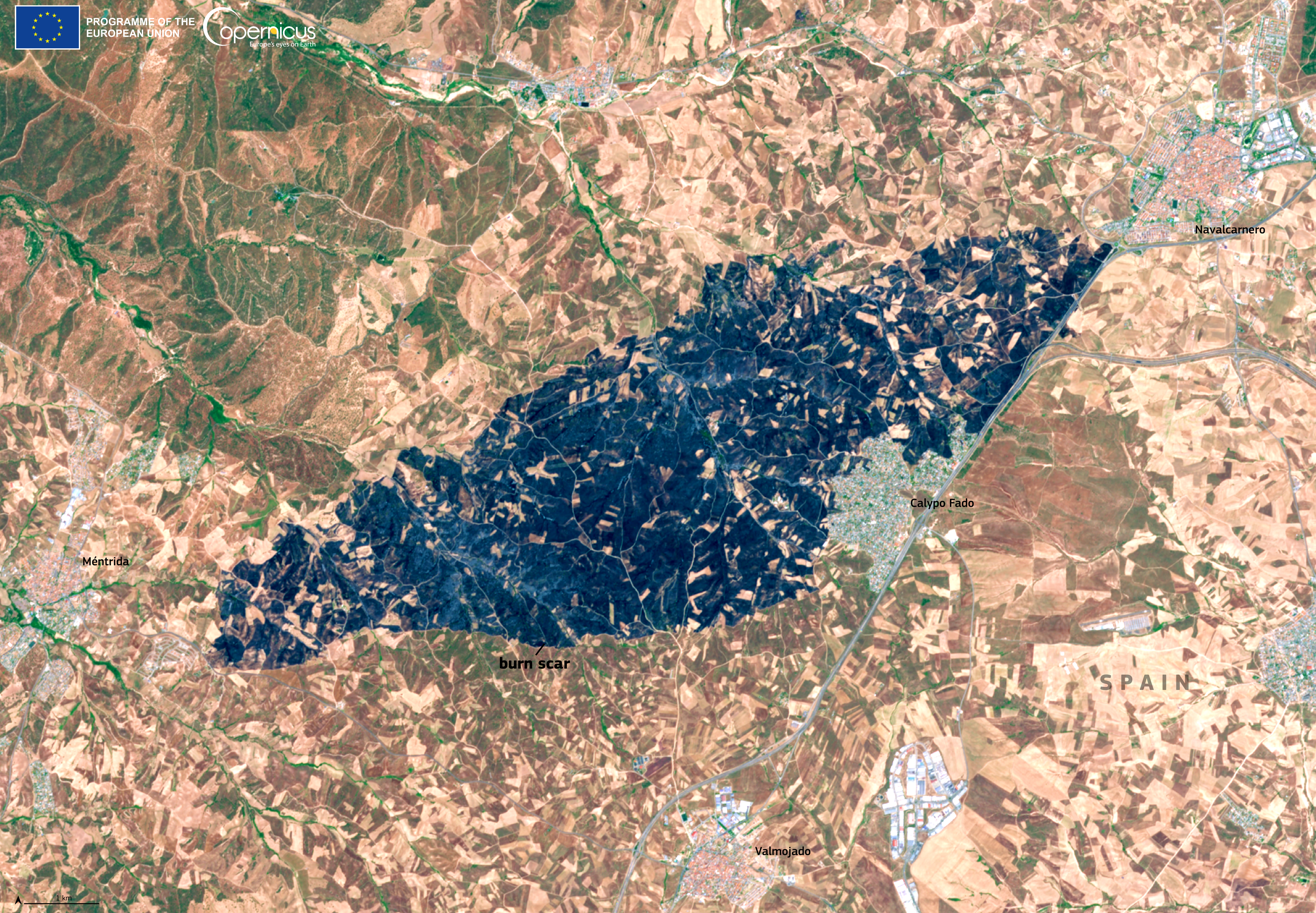
The burn scars of the Torrefeta i Florejacs (left) and Méntrida (right) fires.

On 1 July, a large wildfire started in the municipality of Torrefeta i Florejacs in the Province of Lleida and spread to burn around 5,300 ha (13,000 acres). Two people were killed in Oliola after their vehicle got stuck whilst they were trying to escape and a firefighter was injured in Coscó; around 20,000 people were under a lockdown before the fire was declared stabilised shortly after 10:30 p.m. on 2 July. On 2 July, a local politician died whilst trying to help a tractor driver whose vehicle had started a small wildfire in the municipality of San Cristovo de Cea.

On 8 July, a large fire in Baix Ebre spread to over 3,100 ha (7,700 acres) and lead to the lockdown of over 18,000 people as it spread to the Els Ports Natural Park and left four firefighters injured. On 17 July, a fire started near Méntrida and sent a cloud of smoke over Madrid as it spread to over 3,000 ha (7,400 acres) and forced dozens of people to evacuate.

On 28 July, a wildfire started in the Tiétar valley in Ávila and grew to over 2,000 ha (4,900 acres), forcing El Arenal and Mombeltrán to be placed under lockdown. On 29 July, a fire started in Caminomorisco in Cáceres and grew to 2,778 ha (6,860 acres) before it was declared under control on 2 August; around 200 people were evacuated and three firefighters were injured.

On 11 August, a wildfire started in the suburb of Tres Cantos north of Madrid, killing one person. A second death occurred near Madrid the next day, while a volunteer firefighter died in a separate wildfire in León Province on 14 August. On 17 August, another firefighter died after their firetruck fell down a hill in Castile and León. As of 16 August, there are 14 major fires.

Around 400,000 ha (990,000 acres) of land had been burned by 19 August, making 2025 Spain's worst wildfire season in more than 30 years. The most affected provinces currently are Ourense, León and Zamora, amounting for almost half of all the burnt surface. With 150,000 ha (370,000 acres) burned, Orense saw 1/7 of its total surface affected by the fires. The deficiency of fire prevention measures is being investigated by Spain's environmental prosecutor.

=== Syria ===
On 3 July, a number of forest fires broke out near the Turkish border in Latakia Governorate. Fires in the Qastal Ma'af area moved close to villages, prompting the evacuation of multiple areas. On 5 July, Turkey sent two aircraft and eleven vehicles to Syria to help them fight the fires. By 6 July, the fires had consumed over 3% of Syria's total forested land, based on 2023 forest cover figures of approximately 5,270 km^{2}, in just three days. The rapid spread of the fires was fueled by extreme heat, prolonged drought, strong winds, and the rugged terrain of the coastal mountains. Efforts to contain the fires were further hampered by the presence of unexploded ordnance from the civil war and limited firefighting resources. In the meantime, at least 38 sq mi (98 km^{2}) of vegetation were destroyed. On 10 July, the United Nations allocated $625,000 to support those affected by the fires, with the Syrian Arab Red Crescent primarily delivering assistance. Despite firefighting efforts being hampered by explosive remnants of prior conflicts, the fires were contained by 13 July after Iraq, Jordan, Lebanon, Qatar and Turkey sent assistance to Syria. Over 14,000 ha (35,000 acres) were burned and at least 12 people were injured during firefighting efforts according to the Ministry of Emergency and Disaster Management: ten suffered from smoke inhalation whilst two suffered burns. By 15 July, with the fire contained, 16,000 ha (40,000 acres) had been burned.

A month later, on 11 August, new wildfires ignited in the western countryside of Hama Governorate and in forested areas of Latakia Governorate, later spreading into Tartus Governorate. Fueled by extreme heat exceeding 45 °C (113 °F), dryness in grass and trees as well as strong winds, the fires forced evacuations in Latakia and Hama. By 14 August, crews and volunteers had been battling the flames for four days amid severe water shortages and limited equipment, with the Food and Agriculture Organization warning of significant losses to forest cover and agricultural land, as the country faced its worst extreme weather in 60 years. On 17 August, Minister of Emergency Raed al-Saleh announced that the wildfires in Latakia and Hama had been extinguished.

=== Turkey ===
Map of 2025 İzmir wildfires (map data)

From June wildfires broke out in İzmir Province in the west. These were ignited due to record breaking temperatures and strong winds. Following the wildfires more than 50,000 residents were evacuated from nearby areas like Seferihisar, Menderes, Kuyucak, and Doğanbey, Beyşehir.

=== United Kingdom ===
The United Kingdom saw its worst year on record for wildfires, which was exacerbated by an unprecedented lack of rainfall throughout spring; this record was broken exceptionally early in the year after the total area burned by wildfires surpassed 29,000 ha (72,000 acres; 110 sq mi; 290 km^{2}) in late April. As of 3 July, over 43,548 ha (107,610 acres; 168.14 sq mi; 435.48 km^{2}) has been burnt, surpassing the previous annual record set in 2019 by more than 14,000 ha (35,000 acres); it has also had the highest number of fires larger than 30 ha (74 acres) at 175, an increase of 24 from the previous record set in 2022.

== Insurance Implications ==
According to a Morningstar DBRS report published in August, European wildfires highlight the growing importance of secondary perils for the insurance and reinsurance industry. The increasing frequency and severity of wildfires around the world are forcing insurers to reconsider their risk appetite for underwriting risks in wildland–urban interface areas. According to the report, southern Europe in particular is increasingly exposed to longer burn seasons and weather anomalies. It also emphasizes the potential threat of wildfires to critical infrastructure and the rising number of claims related to ash and smoke. While insured loss estimates for Europe's 2025 wildfires are still developing, the broader picture is clear: secondary perils such as wildfires, flood, and convective stroms are now driving the bulk of annual insured natural catastrophe losses.

== See also ==
- 2025 European heatwaves
- 2022 European and Mediterranean wildfires
- Climate change in Europe
