= 2024 European heatwaves =

Natural disasters

Meteorological history
- Duration: June - August 2024
- Heat event
- Max temp: 46.8 °C (116.2 °F), recorded at Agios Vasileios, Cyprus in July 2024

Overall effects
- Fatalities: 62,700+
- Areas affected: Albania, Bosnia and Herzegovina, Bulgaria, Czech Republic, Croatia, Denmark, Greece, Hungary, Italy, Moldova, Montenegro, North Macedonia, Portugal, Romania, Serbia, Spain, Ukraine, United Kingdom, Belgium, Cyprus, Estonia, Finland, France, Germany, Ireland, Norway

The 2024 European heatwaves began with a spring heatwave, then progressed from June. They broke several regional temperature records across multiple nations in Southern and Southeast Europe. A report released by Nature Medicine in 2025 found that Europe had over 62,700 heat-related deaths.

== Background ==
Copernicus Climate Change Service (C3S) reported January 2024 as the hottest month with a 1.66 °C above the pre-industrial average making it 0.12 °C warmer than January 2020. For the first time, the global temperature was above 1.5 °C for 12 months, breaching the 1.5 °C limit set by the Paris Agreement in 2015. Risks of record-breaking temperatures in 2024 were also noted by the Met Office in the UK. The unusual warmth during the winter continued in February with Europe reporting a 2 °C above average for February 2024. A warm spell occurred in late February in which daily maxima reached up to 20 °C in southeastern parts of Europe which was 12 °C above the 1991-2020 average. March 2024 also broke a record with 1.68 C above the pre-industrial average.

The European Union's Copernicus and the World Meteorological Organization reported in April 2024 that Europe was Earth's most rapidly warming continent, with temperatures rising at a rate twice as high as the global average rate, and that Europe's 5-year average temperatures were 2.3 °C higher relative to pre-industrial temperatures compared to 1.3 °C for the rest of the world. Both organizations predicted that Europe's "intensifying climate extremes" would contribute to significantly increased "record temperatures, wildfires, heat waves, glacier ice loss, and lack of snowfall".

In southeastern Europe, 43 out of 97 days of summer 2024 were heatwave days, and the region recorded its longest heatwave on record at 13 consecutive days. On July 17, 2024, a record 20% of European land was affected by at least "strong heat stress".

== Spring heatwave ==
2024 European heatwaves
- Heat event
- Max temp: 33.3 °C (91.9 °F)

Overall effects
- Areas affected: Europe

Throughout late March and April 2024, Europe was affected by abnormally high temperatures that reached the summer average. National records for spring temperatures were broken in mainly Eastern European and Southeastern European countries. During March, eight countries had broken temperature records with Moldova reporting the highest 29.7 °C in Sîngerei followed by Albania at 29.6 °C in Kuçovë, Croatia at 29 °C in Osijek, and Belarus at 27.2 °C in Lyelchytsy. The heatwave continued into April with temperatures going above 30 °C in southern parts of Europe making it the first-ever daytime record in April. The highest was recorded in Zenica, Bosnia & Herzegovina, at 33.3 °C on April 14, 2024. After two weeks of persistent heat, a cold spell occurred. It lasted for 10 days and brought late frost in some areas. With Zagreb, Croatia measuring -0,4 °C at April 22 just after measuring 30,5 °C on April 14, which tied April record form 2012. The cause of the heatwave was a stream of hot air from Africa.

== By country ==
=== Albania ===
Albania suffered its first 2024 heatwave in June, causing temporary power outages.

Extreme heat throughout Albania in July 2024 pushed the government to alter Albanian civil servants' working hours for so they could avoid the worst daytime temperatures. Several forest fires occurred in the beginning of July. A 72-year-old man died at his farm in Memaliaj, suspected by health authorities to have been caused by heat stroke.

=== Belgium ===
In June and July, Belgium experienced heatwaves. On 26 June the temperature reached 32.2 °C (90.0 °F) in Buggenhout. On 30 July, the temperature reached 33.4 °C (92.1 °F) in Buggenhout.

=== Bosnia and Herzegovina ===
Bosnia suffered from temporary power outages in June 2024 worsened by a heat wave, causing traffic lights to shut down in Sarajevo. Mostar had temperatures reach 40 °C (104 °F) for six days in a row from 11 to 17 July.

A few days prior to the record-breaking August heatwave, a heat warning was issued projecting the highest daily temperatures going up to 40 °C (104 °F) across the country. The morning temperature for Mostar on August 11, 2024, was recorded at 30 °C (86 °F) at 8:00 AM (CEST).

On August 12, 2024, the Federal Meteorological Hydrological Institute of BIH (FHMZ BIH) issued a red alert warning about temperatures potentially going up as high as 42 °C (108 °F). On that same day at 5:00 PM (CEST), Zenica's temperature was tied with the record high set on August 22, 2012, at 41.3 °C (106.3 °F). On August 13, 2024, Zenica reached a record-breaking 42.6 °C (108.7 °F) temperature (later confirmed to have been recorded on August 12). Meanwhile, the temperature in Sarajevo was at 39.1 °C, about 0.9 °C below the record high 40 °C set in 1946. Mostar reached 41 °C on that same day. Nedim Sladić estimated that the temperature in Sarajevo could also reach 40 °C during that week. It had been widely reported that the temperatures were to continue going above 40 °C for the rest of the week. On August 14, 2024, the temperature in Zvornik reached 40 °C as the heatwave continued.

On August 15, 2024, after reviewing, the FHMZ stated that the recorded temperatures were higher on August 13 with Sarajevo being at 39.7 °C, only 0.3 °C below the record high. The FHMZ also reported that Zenica had once again reached a record-breaking temperature of 42.7 °C (108.9 °F), 0.1 °C higher than its short-lived previous record of 42.6 °C a day prior. Gradačac was recorded at 39.2 °C and Tuzla and Drvar were at 39 °C. The temperature Mostar was recorded at 41.5 °C on August 13.

==== Aftermath ====
The heatwave resulted in record low levels for rivers. Una was recorded at 20 centimeters at Bihać on August 11, 2024, with Lepenica being 21 centimeters at Kiseljak, Bosna being at 59 centimeters in Zenica, and Sana being at 32 centimeters in Vrhpolje. On August 15, 2024, the level of water flow was recorded at a minuscule 18 centimeters for Una at Bihać. The river Jala at Tuzla was recorded at 9 centimeters below the ground.

Since August 28, 2024, Sarajevo's water supply has been restricted every night from 12:30 AM to 5:30 AM as a result to combat the dangerously low level of water in the pump which has been recorded at its lowest of 3.2 meters compared to 25 meters in normal conditions.

=== Bulgaria ===
Bulgaria suffered high temperatures, exceeding 39 °C in many parts of Bulgaria, with Ruse recording 40.1 °C (104.2 °F) in June 2024. As a result, the heatwave led to numerous wildfires, particularly in the regions of Plovdiv and Stara Zagora, where over 150 fires were reported in a single week. Bulgaria received firefighting assistance from Romania deploying firefighting aircraft in some regional wildfires and Greece, which helped battling the wildfires in the cross-border regions.

=== Croatia ===
Croatia suffered from temporary power outages in June 2024 exacerbated by extreme heat, causing most pubs, restaurants, and supermarkets to close in Dubrovnik. Traffic systems went out of order due to blackouts in Split, causing traffic congestion.

In July 2024, the Adriatic Sea reached its highest recorded temperature at 29.5 °C (85.1 °F) along several coastal regions in Croatia. Croatia issued its a red weather alert on 12 July due to high temperatures and risk of heat stroke, its highest level alert. On August 15, the Adriatic Sea reached another record high temperature of 29.9 °C at Malo Jezero, Mljet.

=== Denmark ===
In late June 2024 a heatwave affected Denmark, temperatures reached 30 °C (86 °F) in Copenhagen and many other parts of the country. The highest temperature measured was 30.4 °C (86.7 °F), on 27 June in Aabenraa.

=== Greece ===
Extreme Temperatures

According to HNMS the summer of 2024 was by far the warmest in the country's meteorological history, registering average summer temperatures as high as 32.0 °C. In fact, according to NOA Lindos recorded the highest average summer temperature in Europe with 32.0 °C (89.6 °F). In June 2024, both Sparta and Serres registered a record mean max temperature of 37.6 °C (99.7 °F) while temperatures soared as high as 44.5 °C (112.1 °F) on the island of Crete. According to the National Observatory of Athens in July 2024 Greece experienced its longest lasting heat wave in recorded history with 16 days in total. Gavalou and Serres reached 14 consecutive days with temperatures over 40 °C (104 °F) while minimum temperatures remained over 30 °C (86 °F) for 12 consecutive days in metropolitan Athens. In July 2024, the Hellenic National Meteorological Service station in Serres reached a mean maximum temperature of 39.1 °C (102.4 °F) which is Greece's record to date.

Fires and fatalities

At least six tourists died in June 2024 while hiking in Greece during unusually high temperatures. Victims of extreme heat and exhaustion included a 68-year old German on the island of Crete, an 80-year-old Belgian man in Lato, a 55-year-old American on the island of Mathraki, a Dutch tourist on the island of Samos, and British television presenter Michael Mosley on the island of Symi. Three more tourists were reported as missing, including two French women touring the island of Sikinos and a 59-year-old American police officer on the island of Amorgos.

Greek authorities reported on 2 July that the nation faced its highest risk of wildfires in over two decades. Several forest fires occurred in Corinth and the island of Lesbos in early July. Heat warnings were issued in the Athens region and throughout central Greece on 11 July, with the warning extended to northeastern regions on 12 July. Throughout mid-July, Greece banned outdoor work during the hottest times of the day, which included manual labour, construction work, and deliveries. Extreme heat in Greece forced authorities to close the Acropolis several times during midday throughout June and July to prevent tourist heat-related illnesses. Forty wildfires arose in a 24-hour period between 17 and 18 July. In August 2024 Athens faced significant wildfires and a woman died as a result.

=== Italy ===
During July 2024, temperatures in Italy reached peaks of 40 °C (104 °F), prompting the Italian government to issue excessive heat warnings for thirteen cities which included Rome, Trieste, and Palermo. Two firefighters were killed while fighting a wildfire in the Basilicata region. Another man was killed by a falling tree near Brindisi, in Apulia, while battling a fire. Italy's civil protection service reported eighteen calls in southern regions requiring assistance with quenching wildfires. Rome's zoo planned to provide ice and popsicles to several animals to prevent overheating. The hotter-than-average temperatures combined with less-than-average rainfall allowed large swarms of locusts to rapidly grow in Emilia-Romagna and destroy orchards and crop fields.

Between 18 and 19 July, four people died of heatstrokes across beaches in the region of Apulia. Two days prior, a 57-year-old man died on a beach in Olbia.

On July 13, a man died in Rome after collapsing on a street due to a heatstroke. On July 18, a 57-year-old man died in Ancona after collapsing on a street. A 66-year-old homeless man died in Venice on July 20, while a child died in the same city two days before.

=== Moldova ===
Chișinău temperatures exceeded 40 °C (104 °F) in mid-July.

=== North Macedonia ===
As a result of extreme heat and a lack of rainfall, North Macedonia suffered from roughly 200 wildfires since the start of July, causing one firefighter injury. Dozens of wildfires were reported in a 24-hour period on 16–17 July, primarily occurring in the eastern region of the nation and requiring international firefighting assistance from Turkey, Serbia, Montenegro, Romania, and Croatia. One of the wildfires extended to nearly 30 kilometers (21 miles) in width. To reduce the likelihood of new wildfires starting, the Macedonian government issued a one-month state of emergency that included a ban on entering forest areas.

=== Montenegro ===
As a result of extreme heat in June 2024 affecting the Balkans, Montenegro's electrical grid was overloaded from increased electricity consumption, causing a blackout that affected almost the entire country for several hours.

Temperatures reached a record high of 39 °C (102 °F) in the capital of Podgorica on 10 July.

=== Romania ===
Romania experienced a series of record breaking heat waves during the summer of 2024, culminating in one of the hottest summer on record for the country. In early to mid July, the National Meteorological Administration (ANM) issued Red Code heat alerts for large parts of Romania, with forecast and observations showing daytime maxima in the high 30s to low 40s°C. Temperatures in many areas ranged from about 37°C to 42°C, and the official Bucharest station recorded a high of 41°C on 16 July 2024; while some urban monitoring sites, such as parks in the capital, reported peaks near 43°C.

=== Serbia ===
The intensity of the July 2024 heatwave in Serbia caused the Rusanda salt lake in Vojvodina province to dry up for the first time in recorded history. On 11 July, several doctors reported treating many citizens who suffered from headaches, dizziness, or loss of consciousness due to the 35 °C (95 °F) temperature. Serbian capital Belgrade recorded a record high temperature on 16 July at 38.4 °C (101.1 °F), with the state power company reporting that Serbia reached its record daily energy consumption on the same day due to widespread air conditioning use.

=== Ukraine ===
In July 2024, Ukraine suffered from a heatwave impacting the entire nation, with temperatures reaching a peak of 40 °C (104 °F), and Kyiv surpassing its temperature record on 15 July at 34.2 °C (93.6 °F). The heat wave worsened the strain on Ukraine's power grid already damaged by persistent Russian drone and missile attacks, with state electricity company Ukrenergo reporting that electricity consumption exceeded the generating capacity of Ukraine's running power facilities. The strain on the power grid forced utility authorities to impose widespread blackouts throughout several Ukrainian regions, including Kharkiv, Sumy, Poltava, Zaporizhzhia, Donetsk, Dnipropetrovsk and Kirovohrad oblasts. In addition, most buildings in Kyiv were without power for at least ten hours a day.

State meteorologists forecasted that the prolonged extreme heat could cause up to 30% declines in late crop harvests in southern, eastern, and central regions, resulting in significant economic losses.

=== United Kingdom ===
In late June 2024, the United Kingdom was affected by a heatwave, with most of the country seeing temperatures reaching 26 °C (79 °F).

In mid-July and late-July 2024, heatwaves affected the United Kingdom, and again in August.

On 12 August, a temperature of 34.8 °C (94.6 °F) was recorded in Cambridge, exceeding the previously recorded temperature of 32.0 °C (89.6 °F) on 30 July at Kew Gardens & Heathrow Airport.

== Highest temperature per country ==
Country	Temperature	Date	Location	Source
Austria	35.0 °C (95.0 °F)	27 July	Vienna	
Belgium	36.0 °C (96.8 °F)	12 August	Zele	
Bosnia and Herzegovina	42.7 °C (108.9 °F)	13 August	Zenica	
Bulgaria	43.8 °C (110.8 °F)	25 July	Sandanski	
Croatia	36.6 °C (97.9 °F)	16 August	Zagreb	
Cyprus	46.8 °C (116.2 °F)	July 2024	Agios Vasileios	
Czech Republic	37.1 °C (98.8 °F)	14 August	Strážnice	
Denmark	30.5 °C (86.9 °F)	29 August	Holbæk	
England	34.8 °C (94.6 °F)	12 August	Cambridge	
Estonia	33.1 °C (91.6 °F)	29 June	Võru	
Finland	31.1 °C (88.0 °F)	28 June	Turku	
France	38.9 °C (102.0 °F)	11 August	Mont-de-Marsan	
Germany	36.5 °C (97.7 °F)	13 August	Bad Neuenahr-Ahrweiler	
Greece	44.5 °C (112.1 °F)	13 June	Crete	
Ireland	26.6 °C (79.9 °F)	24 June	Phoenix Park	
Italy	44.0 °C (111.2 °F)	2 August	San Michele di Ganzaria	
Lithuania	34.9 °C (94.8 °F)	11 July	Druskininkai	
Luxembourg	32.4 °C (90.3 °F)	13 August	Luxembourg City	
Netherlands	34.9 °C (94.8 °F)	13 August	Nieuw-Beerta	
Norway	30.6 °C (87.1 °F)	6 September	Etne	
Poland	37.2 °C (99.0 °F)	15 August	Pysznica	
Portugal	45.6 °C (114.1 °F)	10 August	Pinhão (Alijó), Vila Real	
Romania	41.0 °C (105.8 °F)	16 July	Bucharest	
Scotland	26.6 °C (79.9 °F)	23 June	Aberdeen	
Serbia	40.0 °C (104.0 °F)	17 July	Niš	
Slovakia	38.3 °C (100.9 °F)	14 August	Mužla	
Spain	45.7 °C (114.3 °F)	24 July	El Granado, Huelva	
Sweden	32.0 °C (89.6 °F)	28 June	Uppsala	
Switzerland	35.4 °C (95.7 °F)	24 August	Basel	
Ukraine	40.4 °C (104.7 °F)	22 July	Luhansk	
Wales	29.0 °C (84.2 °F)	30 July	Usk	

== Highest temperature by capital city ==
Capital City	Temperature	Date	Source
Athens	43.8 °C (110.8 °F)	13 June	
Bucharest	41.0 °C (105.8 °F)	16 July	
Copenhagen	30.2 °C (86.4 °F)	27 June	
London	33.0 °C (91.4 °F)	12 August	
Tallinn	32.3 °C (90.1 °F)	28 June	
Helsinki	26.6 °C (79.9 °F)	28 June	
Berlin	34.1 °C (93.4 °F)	29 August	
Budapest	37.9 °C (100.2 °F)	12 July	
Reykjavík	17.4 °C (63.3 °F)	3 August	
Sarajevo	39.7 °C (103.5 °F)	13 August	
Sofia	37.0 °C (98.6 °F)	18 July	
Dublin	26.6 °C (79.9 °F)	24 June	
Amsterdam	31.6 °C (88.9 °F)	12 August	
Oslo	28.3 °C (82.9 °F)	27 June	
Edinburgh	24.9 °C (76.8 °F)	23 June	
Madrid	39.9 °C (103.8 °F)	24 July	
Cardiff	26.0 °C (78.8 °F)	25 June	

== See also ==
- Climate change in Europe
- List of weather records
- 2026 European heatwaves
- 2025 European heatwaves
- 2023 European heatwaves
- 2022 European heatwaves
- 2019 European heat waves
- List of heat waves
- Extreme weather
