= Agia Varvara, Paphos =

Agia Varvara Αγία Βαρβάρα Engindere / Ayvarvara
- Location in Cyprus
- Coordinates: 34°45′2″N 32°30′41″E
- Country: Cyprus
- District: Paphos District

Population (2011)
  - Total: 172
- Time zone: UTC+2 (EET)
  - Summer (DST): UTC+3 (EEST)

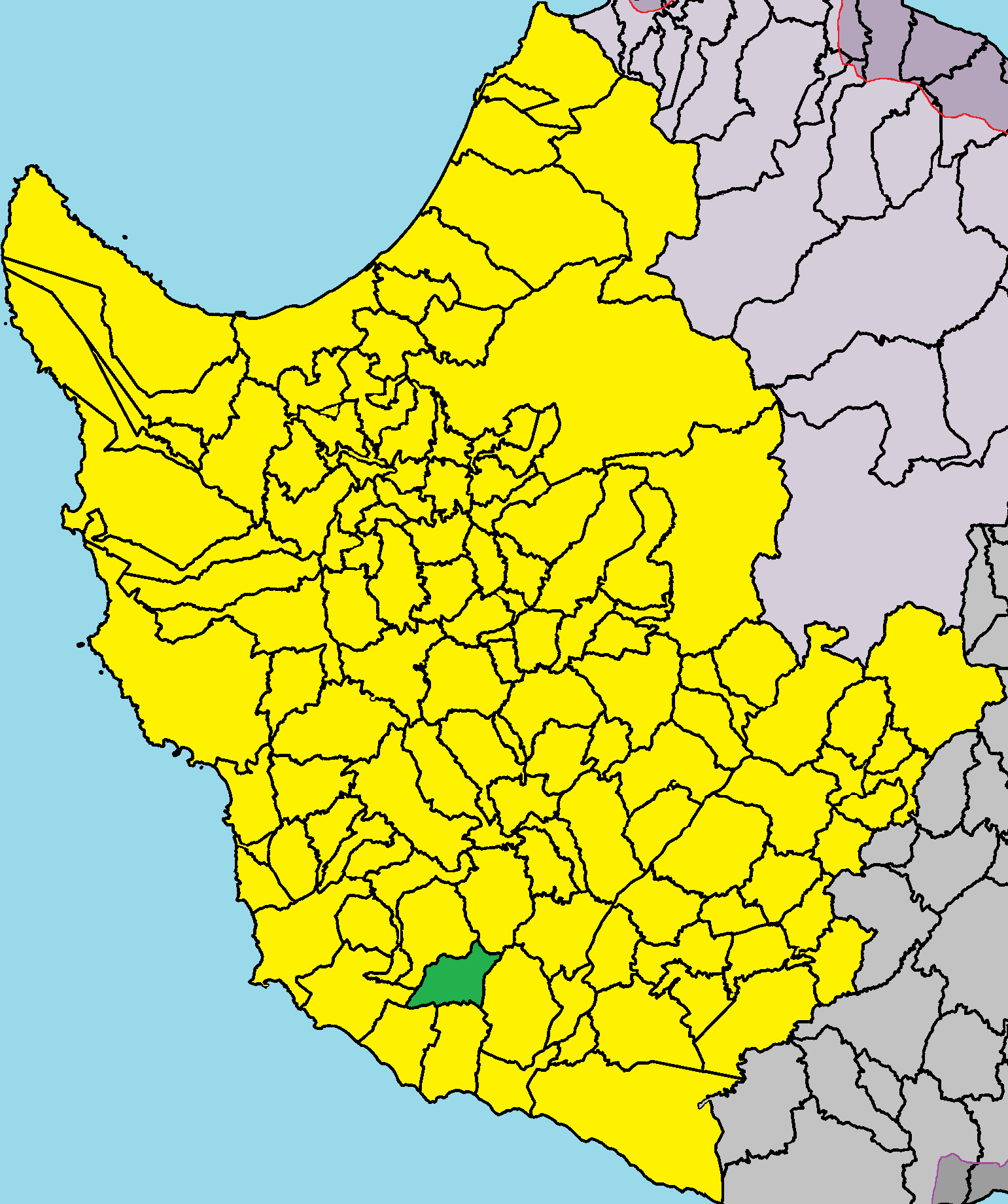
Agia Varvara in Paphos District.

Agia Varvara (Greek: Αγία Βαρβάρα, Turkish: Engindere or Ayvarvara) is a village located in the Paphos District of Cyprus. Prior to 1974, the village was largely inhabited by Turkish Cypriots. Afterwards, the Turkish Cypriot population was relocated to Karavas, Trachoni, Pentageia, Famagusta and Morphou and was partially replaced by displaced Greek Cypriots from the north.
