= Agios Vasileios =

Agios Vasileios (Greek for Saint Basil) may refer to the following places:

In Greece

- Agios Vasileios, Rethymno, a municipality near Rethymno, Crete
- Agios Vasileios, Archanes-Asterousia, a village in the municipality Archanes-Asterousia, Heraklion regional unit, Crete
- Agios Vasileios, Viannos, a village in the municipality Viannos, Heraklion regional unit, Crete
- Agios Vasileios, Achaea, a village near Patras
- Agios Vasileios, Corinthia, a village near Corinth
- Agios Vasileios, Laconia, site of a Mycenaean palace
- Agios Vasileios, a village in the municipality East Mani
- Agios Vasileios, Mount Athos, a hermitage in Mount Athos

In Cyprus

- Agios Vasileios, Cyprus
