= 2025 European heatwaves =

Meteorological history
- Duration: April - September
- Heat wave
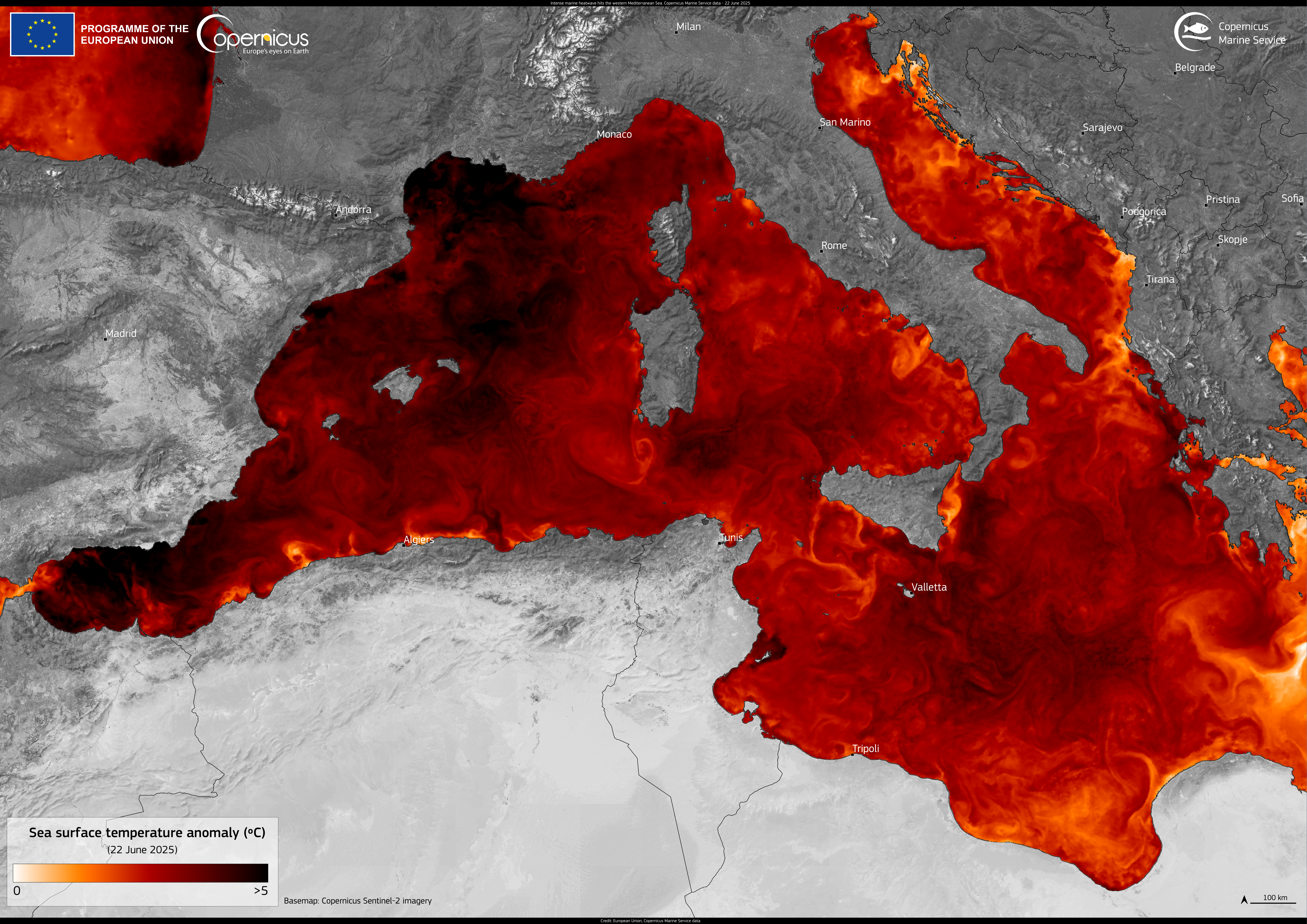
- Sea surface temperature anomalies in the Mediterranean on 22 June
- Max temp: 46.6 °C (115.9 °F), recorded at Mora, Portugal on 29 June 2025

Overall effects
- Fatalities: 14,956+ (Note: Italy: 4,597 Spain: 2,841 France: 2,841 Germany: 1,477 United Kingdom: 1,147 Romania: 1,064 Greece: 808 Bulgaria: 552 Portugal: 285+ Croatia: 268 Turkey: 17+ France: 4+ Cyprus: 2+ Albania: 1+ Austria: 449); 16,500+ (estimated)
- Areas affected: Albania; Austria; Belarus; Bosnia and Herzegovina; Croatia; Estonia; France; Finland; Germany; Greece; Iceland; Ireland; Italy; Latvia; Lithuania; North Macedonia; Norway; Poland; Portugal; Romania; Russia; Serbia; Slovenia; Spain; Switzerland; Sweden; Turkey; United Kingdom

From April to September 2025, parts of Europe were affected by multiple heatwaves. Record-breaking temperatures came as early as April; however, the most extreme temperatures began in mid-June, when experts estimated hundreds of heat-related deaths in the United Kingdom alone. National records for the maximum June temperature in both Portugal and Spain were broken when temperatures surpassed 46 °C (115 °F), whilst regional records were also broken in at least ten other countries. The heatwaves have fueled numerous wildfires across Europe, causing further damage to ecosystems, property, human life and air quality.

Scientists found that by 18 September, around 16,500 people may have died as a result of climate change during the summer, equating to about 68% of deaths in the heatwave due to global warming. A 2026 study found that global emissions since the 2015 Paris Agreement intensified the June 2025 European heatwave. The study estimated that regional-mean temperatures would have been 0.34°C lower if cumulative emissions had remained at 2015 levels, under the same large-scale weather conditions. In September, the national weather agency for Spain announced that the summer had been the hottest on record, averaging 24.2 °C (75.6 °F) between 1 June and 31 August.

== By country ==
Contents
- Albania · Austria · Belarus · Bosnia and Herzegovina · Bulgaria · Croatia · Estonia · Fennoscandia · France · Germany · Greece · Iceland · Ireland · Italy · Latvia · Lithuania · North Macedonia · Poland · Portugal · Russia · Serbia · Slovenia · Spain · Switzerland · Turkey · United Kingdom

=== Albania ===
In mid-April, Albania was one of many countries in central and eastern Europe to be hit by unseasonably warm temperatures, with Tirana forecasted to reach 28 °C (82 °F).

On 9 June, a temperature of 37.6 °C (99.7 °F) was recorded in Tirana as much of the Balkans reached 37 °C (99 °F).

=== Austria ===
On 26 June, the record for the maximum June temperature in the state of Carinthia was broken after 38.3 °C (100.9 °F) was recorded in Feistritz ob Bleiburg; the June records for a number of individual weather stations were also broken. A retroactive study by the Austrian Agency for Health and Food Safety has found 449 cases of people dying from the consequences of heat in the summer of 2025.

=== Belarus ===
In mid-April, Belarus was one of many countries in central and eastern Europe to be hit by unseasonably warm temperatures.

On 3 July, temperatures were forecasted to reach 35 °C (95 °F) in the southwest, including Brest, as an orange danger level was declared across the country.

=== Bosnia and Herzegovina ===
On 26 June, the records for the maximum June temperature were broken in three cities: Doboj, Sarajevo and Tuzla which recorded 38.2 °C (100.8 °F), 38.8 °C (101.8 °F) and 37.7 °C (99.9 °F) respectively. Railway tracks between Vrbanja and Čelinac were deformed by the heat, causing the suspension of ŽRS services.

On 3 July, a temperature of 41 °C (106 °F) was recorded in Mostar, whilst the Brčko District faced an increase in wildfires following high temperatures. From 4 July, some areas of Sarajevo began to restrict water consumption from 10 p.m. to 7 a.m. On the same day, Mostar recorded a temperature of 41 °C (106 °F) for the second time consecutively.

On 21 July, a temperature of 38.6 °C (101.5 °F) was recorded in Banja Luka while Sarajevo recorded a 37 °C (99 °F) temperature, about 1.5 °C (2.7 °F) below the record July temperature it set in 2021. During the second heatwave, Trebinje recorded a temperature of 40 °C (104 °F) on 25 July, making it the first time to record such temperature since August 2012. On the same day, Mostar recorded a temperature of 41 °C (106 °F) for the third time in the month.

=== Croatia ===
On 26 June, the records for the maximum June temperature were broken in a number of cities, including Slavonski Brod where a temperature of 38.2 °C (100.8 °F) was recorded, whilst temperatures in the Grič area of Zagreb came within 0.1 °C (0.18 °F) of its June record. The Pleso area of Zagreb had the exact temperature matching with Slavonski Brod.

=== Estonia ===
In mid-April, Estonia was one of many countries in central and eastern Europe to be hit by unseasonably warm temperatures which were expected to climb above 24 °C (75 °F). The country's record for the maximum April temperature was broken when 28.8 °C (83.8 °F) was recorded.

=== France ===
In late May, parts of France experienced record-breaking heat which also swept across the Iberian Peninsula. On 28 May, a temperature of 32.3 °C (90.1 °F) was recorded in Canet-en-Roussillon. On 30 May, the records for the maximum May temperature were broken at 27 weather stations in western France, including Limoges and Toulouse; the highest of these was Sabres where a temperature of 36.4 °C (97.5 °F) was recorded.

On 19 June, France entered its 50th heatwave since records began in 1947, with 27 departments under yellow heat alerts from 12 p.m. Météo-France issued orange heat alerts for 16 departments from 20 June, with over 30 more departments under yellow alerts. Électricité de France warned that electricity supplies could be disrupted due to high water temperatures impacting electricity production, particularly at the Bugey Nuclear Power Plant. On 21 June, a temperature of 39.9 °C (103.8 °F) was recorded in Châteaumeillant as orange heat alerts were lifted for all departments except Isère and Rhône on 22 and 23 June.

On 29 June, one reactor at the Golfech Nuclear Power Plant was shut down due to rising water temperatures in the Garonne. Both the Blayais and Bugey nuclear power plants were also producing less electricity due to the rivers they use for cooling being warmer than normal.

On 30 June, a record-breaking 84 departments were under orange heatwave alerts, with a further seven under yellow alerts; only five departments had no alerts: Calvados, Côtes-d'Armor, Finistère, Manche and Seine-Maritime. The following day, 16 departments were upgraded to red alerts, including all of the Paris Region. Part of the Eiffel Tower was closed between 30 June and 2 July due to the extreme heat.

On 1 July, a temperature of 41.4 °C (106.5 °F) was recorded in Cadenet. According to the Ministry of National Education, a total of 2,213 schools were closed due to the heatwave.

On 2 July, four departments were under red heatwave alerts, with a further 55 under orange alerts. Météo-France announced that France had experienced its second-hottest June on record, with an average temperature of 22.2 °C (72.0 °F), beaten only by 2003. The agency also noted that a number of cities exceeded 35 °C (95 °F) for an unprecedented number of days, including Avignon with eleven days and Carcassonne, Nîmes and Toulouse with nine days. A 10-year-old American tourist died after collapsing during a visit to the Palace of Versailles; earlier that day Agnès Pannier-Runacher, the Minister of Ecological Transition, reported two additional heat-related fatalities and said that over 300 people had received emergency care due to the heat.

The heatwave ended on 4 July 2025.

Around 10 August 2025, a new heatwave began.

=== Fennoscandia ===
The Fennoscandian heatwave lasted from mid-July to early August and resulted in an unusually high number of hot days (25°C or more) in Norway, Sweden and Finland. Ylitornio, Finland had 26 hot days. Many observation stations in central and southern Finland had 20-25 hot days. There were also 22 days with temperatures exceeding 30°C. The highest temperature was 32.6°C, which was recorded at Oulu Airport on 31 July.

There were fewer hot days in Sweden than in Finland, but on 24 July a temperature of 33.6°C was recorded at Skellefteå Airport. Temperatures of 32-33°C were recorded at a number of observation stations in northern Sweden. In Norway the highest temperature was 34.9°C, which was recorded at the Frosta observation station. This was also the highest recorded temperature during the Fennoscandian heatwave.

The highest ever recorded temperatures in Norway, Sweden and Finland are 35.6°C (1970), 38.0°C (1933, 1947) and 37.2°C (2010), respectively. What sets the 2025 heatwave apart from its predecessors is the fact that it lasted for weeks, that some of the highest temperatures were recorded at high latitudes and that there was an unusually high number of days with temperatures exceeding 25°C-30°C.

=== Germany ===
In mid-April, eastern Germany was one of many areas of central and eastern Europe to be hit by unseasonably warm temperatures, with Berlin forecasted to reach 26 °C (79 °F) on 16 and 17 April. On 17 April, the Brandenburg towns of Coschen and Cottbus even reported 28.4 °C (83.1 °F).

On 2 May, Germany saw the first hot day of the year in Waghäusel-Kirrlach, with temperatures reaching 30.4 °C (86.7 °F). There, on 31 May, it even reached 32.5 °C (90.5 °F).

On 21 June, a temperature of 32.8 °C (91.0 °F) was recorded in Wutöschingen.

On 1 July, a large wildfire on the border of Saxony and Brandenburg led to the evacuation of over 100 people. On 2 July, Germany experienced its hottest day of the year so far when 39.3 °C (102.7 °F) was recorded in Andernach, closely followed by 39.2 °C (102.6 °F) in Tangerhütte and 39.1 °C (102.4 °F) in Kitzingen.

Between 12 and 14 August, another heatwave occurred, with temperatures reaching over 40 °C (104 °F) in multiple cities of North Rhine-Westphalia.

=== Greece ===
Between 9 and 12 June, nighttime minimum temperatures remained mostly over 30 °C (86 °F) in Greece.

Since late June, the country has experienced a number of wildfires which were exacerbated by high temperatures and have caused significant damage. On 27 June, a temperature of 43.2 °C (109.8 °F) was recorded in Skala, Messenia. According to the National Observatory of Athens, Greece had experienced its second-hottest June on record, beaten only by 2024. As a result, the Ministry of Labour and Social Security imposed a mandatory work stoppage from midday to 17:00 affecting outdoor manual labor and food delivery services in parts of the country beginning on 7 July. The Acropolis was also ordered closed from 13:00 to 17:00 on 8 July due to extreme heat.

On 22 July, the Greek Ministry of Labor has implemented protective measures for construction workers and other particularly vulnerable people due to a heat wave. In Athens and many other parts of the country, it has been ordered that no outdoor work is permitted between 12 and 5 p.m.
The Hellenic National Meteorological Service (HNMS) expects the heat to continue throughout the week. In central Greece, the HNMS expected 43 degrees Celsius.

=== Iceland ===
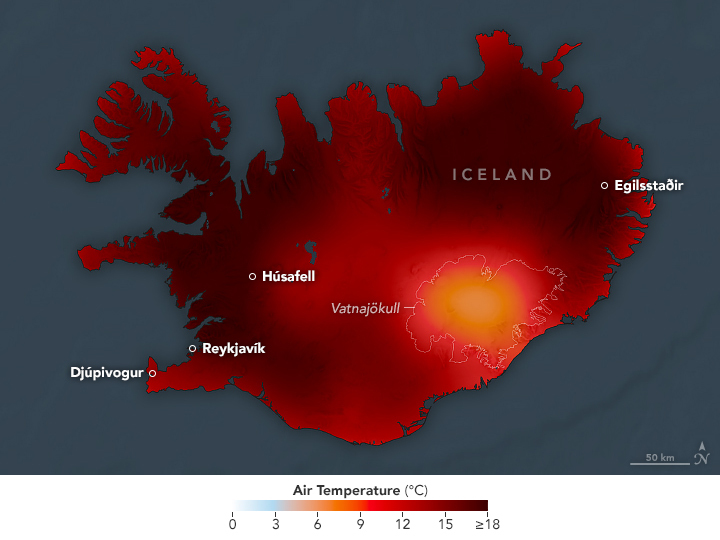
A map showing air temperatures in Iceland on 18 May

In mid-May, Iceland experienced a record-breaking heatwave, with temperatures reaching at least 20 °C (68 °F) for ten consecutive days between 13 and 22 May. The country's record for the highest May temperature was broken on 15 May at Egilsstaðir Airport, where 26.6 °C (79.9 °F) was recorded; the previous record of 25.6 °C (78.1 °F), recorded in 1992, was surpassed three more times during the heatwave. Furthermore, 94% of the automatic weather stations in the country which have been in operation for at least 20 years broke their records for the maximum May temperature; three staffed stations also broke their records for the maximum May temperature, including Stykkishólmur which has been in operation for 174 years.

=== Ireland ===
On 30 April, the country's record for the maximum April temperature was broken when 25.9 °C (78.6 °F) was recorded in Athenry, breaking the previous record set in 1984.

On 19 June, temperatures reached 27 °C (81 °F) in County Roscommon, making it the hottest day of the year so far. A temperature of 29.6 °C (85.3 °F) was recorded at the same location the following day, making 20 June the hottest day in Ireland in 3 years.

On 11 July, a total of 14 counties were a yellow warning for high temperatures; the whole country was under temperature warnings the following two days. On 12 July, a temperature of 31.1 °C (88.0 °F) in County Roscommon, making it the hottest day of the year so far.

On 13 July, Connemara National Park recorded a peak of 32.2 °C (90.0 °F), the highest temperature in Ireland in 2025.

=== Italy ===
On 12 June, Florence was forecasted to reach 39 °C (102 °F) as thunderstorms gave way to high temperatures.

On 25 June, temperatures reached a record-breaking 9.5 °C (49.1 °F) at Capanna Margherita, 4,554 m (14,941 ft) above sea level. On 26 June, temperatures reached 38.2 °C (100.8 °F) in Bologna; the record for the highest minimum June temperature there was broken at 27.3 °C (81.1 °F). On 27 June, a total of 27 cities were under heat alerts: 13 were on red, 10 were on orange and four were on yellow. On 30 June, two people died amid high temperatures: a 47-year-old man died in San Lazzaro di Savena whilst working at a construction site; and a 53-year-old woman died in Bagheria after collapsing from the heat. On 1 July, a power outage caused by excessive energy consumption and underground cables overheating hit part of Florence, leading to the evacuation of the Rinascente department store in the Piazza della Repubblica. On 2 July, two men died at beaches in Sardinia and another died from heart failure in Genoa.

=== Kosovo ===
On 25 June, a temperature of 42.5 °C (108.5 °F) was recorded by the Kosovo Hydrometeorological Agency in Klina, the hottest temperature recorded since July 2007. On 26 June, a temperature of 42.4 °C (108.3 °F) was recorded in Hani i Elezit.

=== Latvia ===
In mid-April, Latvia was one of many countries in central and eastern Europe to be hit by unseasonably warm temperatures which were expected to climb above 24 °C (75 °F). The country's record for the maximum April temperature was broken when 28.4 °C (83.1 °F) was recorded.

=== Lithuania ===
In mid-April, Lithuania was one of many countries in central and eastern Europe to be hit by unseasonably warm temperatures which were expected to climb above 24 °C (75 °F). On 18 April, four weather stations surpassed 29 °C (84 °F), breaking the country's previous record for the maximum April 18 temperature.

=== North Macedonia ===
On 26 June, a temperature of 41.7 °C (107.1 °F) was recorded in Skopje, the hottest June temperature recorded there since 1949.

=== Poland ===
In mid-April, Poland was one of many countries in central and eastern Europe to be hit by unseasonably warm temperatures, with Łódź forecasted to reach 28 °C (82 °F). On 18 April, a temperature of 29.4 °C (84.9 °F) was recorded in Łeba, which is almost 20 °C (36 °F) above its April average.

=== Portugal ===
In late May, Portugal experienced record-breaking heat which swept across the Iberian Peninsula and into France. On 28 May, the record for the maximum May temperature was broken in Beja when 37.4 °C (99.3 °F) was recorded there. On 30 May, the May record was broken in both Alvalade and Amareleja, where temperatures reached 39.6 °C (103.3 °F) and 39.8 °C (103.6 °F) respectively.

On 8 June, a temperature of 40.5 °C (104.9 °F) was recorded in Mértola. During the week of 15 to 21 June, numerous weather stations in Portugal recorded temperatures surpassing 40 °C (104 °F), peaking on 17 June when 42.3 °C (108.1 °F) was recorded in Alvega.

On 29 June, the national record for the maximum June temperature was broken after 46.6 °C (115.9 °F) was recorded in Mora, surpassing the previous record of 44.9 °C (112.8 °F), which was set in Alcácer do Sal in 2017; temperatures came close to the country's absolute maximum of 47.3 °C (117.1 °F), which was recorded in 2003. Out of the 90 weather stations in the country, 31 reached or exceeded their records for the maximum June temperature on 28 and 29 June. Between 28 June and the first days of July, the Directorate-General of Health recorded 284 excess deaths, primarily in people aged 85 and over.

Heatwaves continued through August, resulting in the longest heatwave recorded for the interior region lasting from 29 July and 17 August.

=== Russia ===
In mid-April, western Russia was one of many areas of central and eastern Europe to be hit by unseasonably warm temperatures.

=== Serbia ===
On 26 June, a temperature of 40.7 °C (105.3 °F) was recorded in Ćuprija, whilst daily records for 25 and 26 June were broken in Belgrade and Novi Sad, where temperatures reached 38.1 °C (100.6 °F) and 38.7 °C (101.7 °F) respectively.

=== Slovenia ===
The first heatwave to affect Slovenia in 2025 began on 23 June and lasted until 3 or 4 July in most parts of the country, while it continued until 6 July in coastal areas. It was one of the earliest and longest heatwaves ever recorded in Slovenia. The heatwave peaked on 26 June, with the Slovenian Environment Agency (ARSO) recording temperatures in excess of 37 °C (99 °F) at five stations in its network. That day, a temperature of 38.4 °C (101.1 °F) was recorded at the agency's station in Dobliče, surpassing the country's previous record June temperature of 38.0 °C (100.4 °F) that was recorded in Podnanos in 2022.

A second heatwave affected Slovenia between 9 and 16 August. In coastal areas, temperatures reached 37 °C (99 °F) on three days, with similar temperatures also recorded at several stations in the ARSO network in other parts of the country on 10 August. On 14 August, the agency recorded a temperature of 38.8 °C (101.8 °F) at Portorož Airport, which set a new record temperature for that location.

=== Spain ===
Spain experienced its hottest summer on record in 2025. Average temperatures from June to August were 24.2 C. This was in large part because of the multiple heatwaves that hit the country.

The first heatwave to strike Spain in 2025 came in late May and brought record-breaking temperatures to much of the country. On 28 May, a temperature of 39.1 °C (102.4 °F) was recorded in El Granado, whilst the first heat warnings of the year were activated in Andalusia and Catalonia, followed by Aragon, Extremadura and Galicia the following day. On 29 May, the country saw its first day of the year over 40 °C (104 °F) when a temperature of 40.6 °C (105.1 °F) was recorded at Seville Airport; records for the maximum May temperature were broken at five stations, as well as one for the highest minimum May temperature. On 30 May, temperatures surpassed 40 °C in a number of places, with 41.6 °C (106.9 °F) recorded in El Granado; the following day temperatures dropped slightly with a maximum of 40.7 °C (105.3 °F) recorded at Córdoba Airport. On 30 and 31 May, records for the maximum May temperature were broken at five more stations, with records for the highest minimum May temperature broken at three others.

On 8 June, a number of areas in southern Spain were placed on orange and yellow heat warnings; around 40 stations recorded temperatures over 40 °C, with a maximum temperature of 42.9 °C (109.2 °F) recorded in Morón de la Frontera. Dozens of stations were at record levels for early summer.

On 19 June, the record for the maximum June temperature in Huelva was broken when a temperature of 41.1 °C (106.0 °F) was recorded there; the record for the highest minimum June temperature in Morón de la Frontera was broken at 25.0 °C (77.0 °F). On 21 June, temperatures reached 40.4 °C (104.7 °F) in Córdoba, where a 58-year-old man became the first person of the year to die from heatstroke in the region. According to the Carlos III Health Institute, there were 114 deaths attributable to high temperatures between 1 and 21 June. On 22 June, the record for the highest minimum June temperature in Murcia was broken at 24.4 °C (75.9 °F). On 23 June, the records for both the maximum and highest minimum June temperatures at Almería Airport were broken at 40.9 °C (105.6 °F) and 27.1 °C (80.8 °F) respectively.

On 28 June, amid another period of extreme temperatures, the national record for the maximum June temperature was broken after 46.0 °C (114.8 °F) was recorded in El Granado, surpassing the previous record of 45.2 °C (113.4 °F), which was set in Seville in 1965. According to the Carlos III Health Institute, there were a total of 380 deaths attributable to high temperatures throughout June.

On 1 July, two people were killed in a large wildfire in a farming area of the municipality of Torrefeta i Florejacs.

Around 4 August, another heat wave in Portugal, Spain, Italy, Greece and other Mediterranean countries has begun. On 14 August, Spain has asked the EU for help in fighting forest fires. On 16 August, Portugal asked for help. The situation continued to worsen in both countries, and there was no rain in sight. The EU Civil Protection Mechanism was activated.

According to estimates by the European Forest Fire Information System (EFFIS), around 1570 km² of land have been destroyed in Spain since the beginning of 2025 – around half of that in August alone. In the north-west of Spain alone, 19 forest fires raged that were so large or dangerous to settlements that the affected regions had to request assistance from the Government of Spain.

Spain's State Meteorological Agency (AEMET) informed that temperatures had exceeded 44 °C (111 °F) in several places on 16 August. It warned of a very high risk of fires across almost the entire country.

=== Switzerland ===
On 28 June, a temperature of 36.0 °C (96.8 °F) was recorded in Biasca, whilst the national record for the maximum temperature at a pressure of 500 hPa (7.3 psi) was broken after −4.28 °C (24.30 °F) was recorded above Payerne. MeteoSwiss issued a level 3 heatwave warning for large parts of the country starting on 29 June.

On 2 July, the first reactor of the Beznau Nuclear Power Plant was shut down, followed by the second one later that day, leaving the facility entirely offline. The operator of the plant, Axpo, said they had shut it down to prevent the waters of the Aare from overheating and to protect the river's ecosystem. A temperature of 35.7 °C (96.3 °F) was recorded in Basel, making it the second-hottest day of the year so far.

=== Turkey ===
On 26 June, East Thrace, the European part of Turkey, was hit by high temperatures which reached 39.5 °C (103.1 °F) in Edirne and 38 °C (100 °F) in Kırklareli. In late June, amid high temperatures and strong winds, a series of wildfires broke out in İzmir Province which killed at least three people and forced over 50,000 people to evacuate.

The Istanbul Metropolitan Municipality warned of a heatwave between 5 and 9 July and urged endangered groups such as children, the elderly and pregnant women not to stay in direct sunlight.

On 22 July, the Turkish State Meteorological Service published forecasts predicting up to 45 in Diyarbakır. On 27 July, the national record for hottest temperature ever recorded was broken at Silopi (Asian part), in Şırnak Province, where a temperature of 50.5 °C (122.9 °F) was recorded, breaking the previous record of 49.5 °C (121.1 °F) in Sarıcakaya, Eskişehir Province in August 2023.

=== United Kingdom ===
The Met Office considers a heatwave to be when temperatures on three consecutive days surpass 25–28 °C (77–82 °F), depending on the location. The extreme heat exacerbated conditions for wildfires following what had already been the worst year for them on record in the United Kingdom; this record was broken exceptionally early in the year after the total area burned by wildfires surpassed 29,000 ha (72,000 acres; 110 sq mi; 290 km^{2}) in late April.

Statistics released by the Met Office on 1 September confirmed that the summer of 2025 had been the warmest summer on record in the UK, with a mean temperature of 16.1 °C (61.0 °F), surpassing the previous record set in 2018. The record was surpassed again the following year, with a mean temperature of 16.5 °C (61.7 °F), beating the 2025 record by 0.4 °C (32.7 °F).

==== First heatwave (17–22 June) ====
On 18 June, a temperature of 29.3 °C (84.7 °F) was recorded in St James's Park in London as yellow heat-health alerts were issued by the UK Health Security Agency (UKHSA) for most of England which were in place from 12 p.m. that day to 6 p.m. on 22 June. Researchers at the London School of Hygiene & Tropical Medicine estimated that there would be around 570 heat-related deaths between 19 and 22 June, with 129 in London alone.

On 19 June, amber heat-health alerts were issued for all areas of England in place until 9 a.m. on 23 June as Suffolk became the first area of the UK to officially enter a heatwave as temperatures passed 27 °C (81 °F) for the third consecutive day. Temperatures of 32.2 °C (90.0 °F) were recorded at Heathrow and Kew, making it the hottest day of the year so far; Wales also saw its hottest day as 30.2 °C (86.4 °F) was recorded in Cardiff and Trawsgoed. The highest temperature recorded in Scotland was 24.4 °C (75.9 °F) in Glasgow Bishopton, 1.1 °C lower than its hottest day so far for the year. During the Royal Ascot temperatures reached 29.7 °C (85.5 °F), with one person taken to hospital and 42 others receiving treatment on site for heat-related illnesses.

On 20 June, Scotland experienced its hottest day of the year so far as 28.9 °C (84.0 °F) was recorded at Drumnadrochit. Temperatures in both England and Wales reached 30.8 °C (87.4 °F). Transport for London activated a hot weather plan for the London Underground, where average temperatures on certain lines surpass 30 °C (86 °F).

On 21 June, a temperature of 33.2 °C (91.8 °F) was recorded in Charlwood, beating the record set two days earlier. A heatwave was declared in Northern Ireland for the first time in two years as temperatures surpassed 25 °C (77 °F) for the third consecutive day; its hottest day of the year so far was on 20 June when a temperature of 29.5 °C (85.1 °F) was recorded at Castlederg. A fault on a train near Loughborough Junction forced all services in the area to cease, three of which were outside station platforms; these trains had to be evacuated which took up to two and a half hours.

On 22 June, temperatures fell across the country as many areas experienced wind and rain, with overnight yellow weather warnings for thunderstorms in place until 3 a.m. for parts of northern England, northeast Wales and the Scottish Borders.

==== Second heatwave (27 June–2 July) ====
On 26 June, the UKHSA issued amber heat-health alerts for the East Midlands, East of England, London, South East and South West regions, with yellow alerts in place for the West Midlands and Yorkshire and the Humber; all alerts were in place from midday on 27 June to 6 p.m. on 1 July. On 30 June, a yellow alert was issued for the North West region whilst the alerts for the West Midlands and Yorkshire and the Humber were upgraded to amber; all alerts were also extended to end at 9 a.m. on 2 July.

By 27 June, Suffolk was already officially in a heatwave as temperatures had exceeded 27 °C (81 °F) at Santon Downham for three consecutive days. On 29 June, London saw its second day of temperatures surpassing 31 °C (88 °F), whilst temperatures reached 26.4 °C (79.5 °F) at Yeovilton, close to the site of the Glastonbury Festival.

On 30 June, temperatures surpassed 30 °C (86 °F) across much of the country, with a maximum of 33.1 °C (91.6 °F) recorded at Heathrow Airport. In southwest London, Wimbledon saw its hottest opening day on record at 32.3 °C (90.1 °F), surpassing the previous record of 29.3 °C (84.7 °F) set in 2001. In Jersey, the record for the maximum June temperature was broken when a temperature of 33.4 °C (92.1 °F) was recorded on the island.

On 1 July, a temperature of 35.8 °C (96.4 °F) was recorded in Faversham, making it the hottest day of the year so far. Northern Ireland, Scotland and Wales saw much milder temperatures, with the maximums there being 20.5 °C (68.9 °F), 19.7 °C (67.5 °F) and 25.8 °C (78.4 °F) respectively. The Met Office also confirmed that England had experienced its hottest June since records began in 1884, with an average temperature of 16.9 °C (62.4 °F); the United Kingdom as a whole had experienced its second-hottest June with an average of 15.2 °C (59.4 °F). Elsewhere in Scotland, firefighters were battling a series of wildfires in Moray and the neighbouring Highlands for a fourth day.

2 July marked the end of the heatwave in the country, which had lasted as long as six days in some areas. The Environment Agency warned of droughts across the country following what had been one of the driest springs on record; North West England and Yorkshire were already in an official state of drought.

==== Third heatwave (9–15 July) ====
On 8 July, the UKHSA issued yellow heat-health alerts for the East Midlands, East of England, London, South East, South West and West Midlands regions; all alerts were in place from 9 July to 15 July. These regions received additional amber heat-health alerts whilst the remaining three regions of England were placed under yellow alerts; these alerts were in place from midday on 11 July to 9 a.m. on 14 July.

On 11 July, a temperature of 34.7 °C (94.5 °F) was recorded in Astwood Bank whilst Wales saw its hottest day of the year so far when 32.7 °C (90.9 °F) was recorded in Usk. The hottest temperatures in Northern Ireland and Scotland were 28.1 °C (82.6 °F) in Magilligan and 28.9 °C (84.0 °F) in Aboyne. On 12 July, temperatures in Wales reached 33.1 °C (91.6 °F) in Bute Park, making it the hottest day of the year so far; rail services between Aberdare, Merthyr Tydfil and Pontypridd were disrupted after tracks were damaged by the heat and a series of running events in Snowdonia were cancelled. Scotland also saw its hottest day of the year so far when temperatures reached 32.2 °C (90.0 °F) in Aviemore, the highest temperature ever recorded there. Temperatures in Northern Ireland reached 30 °C (86 °F) in Magilligan, also making it the hottest day of the year so far in the country; England saw a high of 33 °C (91 °F) in Ross-on-Wye. On 13 July, temperatures peaked at 31.2 °C (88.2 °F) in Achnagart, with 31.1 °C (88.0 °F) recorded in Ross-on-Wye, England, 30.2 °C (86.4 °F) in Gogerddan, Wales and 27.1 °C (80.8 °F) in Castlederg, Northern Ireland. Four people died in water-related incidents around Scotland, whilst police were searching for a man who had gone missing after entering the River Thames in Oxfordshire.

A hosepipe ban for customers of Yorkshire Water came into effect on 11 July, affecting over five million people; the same day, South East Water announced it would also impose a ban for 1.4 million people in Kent and Sussex from 18 July. On 14 July, Thames Water announced a hosepipe ban for Gloucestershire, Oxfordshire, Berkshire and Wiltshire, affecting 1.1 million people from 22 July. On 15 July, the Environment Agency declared a drought in the regions of the East and West Midlands.

==== Fourth heatwave (11–17 August) ====
On 8 August, the UK Health Security Agency issued a yellow heat health alert for most of England, except the north east and north west, which would be in force from 12pm on Monday 11 August until 6pm on Wednesday 13 August, when temperatures were forecast to go above 30°C. On 11 August, the alert was upgraded to an amber warning for the East Midlands, West Midlands, East of England, London, and the South East, lasting from 9am on 12 August until 6pm on 13 August. On 13 August, the yellow alert was extended to last from 6pm on 13 August until 6pm on 18 August, with the alert covering Yorkshire and The Humber, the East Midlands, the West Midlands, the East of England, London, the South East, and South West.

On 12 August, Northolt in London recorded the highest temperature of the day at 33.4°C.

On 12 August, the Scottish Fire and Rescue Service issued a wildfire warning for Scotland due to very dry conditions, advising against the use of naked flames outdoors. It was the tenth such warning to be issued in 2025, lasting from 13 to 20 August. On 14 August, Natural Resources Wales declared a drought in parts of Wales following the driest six month period since 1976. A drought was declared in North Wales on 29 August.

== Highest temperature by country ==
| Country | Temperature | Date | Location |
|---|---|---|---|
| Albania | 43.8 °C (110.8 °F) | 26 July | Gjirokastra |
| Austria | 38.3 °C (100.9 °F) | 26 June | Feistritz ob Bleiburg |
| Belgium | 38.3 °C (100.9 °F) | 2 July | Diepenbeek |
| Bosnia and Herzegovina | 41.0 °C (105.8 °F) | 3 July | Mostar |
| Bulgaria | 43.5 °C (110.3 °F) | 26 July | Montana |
| Croatia | 38.2 °C (100.8 °F) | 26 June | Slavonski Brod |
| Czech Republic | 37.4 °C (99.3 °F) | 2 July | Husinec-Řež |
| Denmark | 34.0 °C (93.2 °F) | 2 July | Holbæk |
| France | 43.4 °C (110.1 °F) | 10 August | Argeliers |
| Germany | 39.3 °C (102.7 °F) | 2 July | Andernach |
| Greece | 44.9 °C (112.8 °F) | 22 July | Tragana |
| Hungary | 41.3 °C (106.3 °F) | 22 July | Sarkad |
| Iceland | 29.8 °C (85.6 °F) | 16 August | Egilsstaðaflugvöllur |
| Ireland | 32.2 °C (90.0 °F) | 13 July | Connemara National Park |
| Italy | 45.7 °C (114.3 °F) | 22 July | Paternò |
| Jersey | 33.4 °C (92.1 °F) | 30 June | Jersey |
| Kosovo | 42.5 °C (108.5 °F) | 26 July | Klinë |
| Lithuania | 35.6 °C (96.1 °F) | 3 July | Druskininkai |
| Luxembourg | 36.0 °C (96.8 °F) | 2 July | Luxembourg Airport |
| Netherlands | 39.0 °C (102.2 °F) | 2 July | Maastricht |
| North Macedonia | 42.7 °C (108.9 °F) | 26 July | Kavadarci |
| Norway | 34.9 °C (94.8 °F) | 17 July | Frosta, Trøndelag |
| Poland | 36.6 °C (97.9 °F) | 3 July | Kozienice |
| Portugal | 46.6 °C (115.9 °F) | 29 June | Mora |
| Romania | 43.4 °C (110.1 °F) | 26 July | Calafat |
| Serbia | 44.0 °C (111.2 °F) | 26 July | Kruševac |
| Slovakia | 38.7 °C (101.7 °F) | 3 July | Slovenský Grob |
| Slovenia | 38.8 °C (101.8 °F) | 14 August | Portorož Airport |
| Spain | 46.0 °C (114.8 °F) | 28 June | El Granado |
| Sweden | 33.4 °C (92.1 °F) | 2 July | Oskarshamn |
| Switzerland | 36.4 °C (97.5 °F) | 13 August | Geneva |
| United Kingdom | 35.8 °C (96.4 °F) | 1 July | Faversham |

== See also ==
- Climate change in Europe
- 2003 European heatwave, which caused over 70,000 excess deaths
- 2006 European heatwave
- 2018 European heatwave
- 2019 European heatwaves
- 2022 European heatwaves
- 2023 European heatwaves
- 2024 European heatwaves
- 2026 European heatwaves
- List of weather records
- Weather of 2025
