= Trachoni, Nicosia =

Trachoni: Τραχώνι (Greek); Demirhan (Turkish)
- Village
- Location in Cyprus
- Coordinates: 35°13′24″N 33°28′43″E
- Country (de jure): Cyprus
  - District: Nicosia District
- Country (de facto): Northern Cyprus
  - District: Lefkoşa District

Population (2006)
  - Total: 454
- Time zone: UTC+2 (EET)
  - Summer (DST): UTC+3 (EEST)

Trachoni (Greek: Τραχώνι; Turkish: Demirhan) is a village in the Nicosia District of Cyprus, located just south of Kythrea on the main Nicosia-Famagusta road. The town is under de facto control of Northern Cyprus.
