= Méntrida, Toledo =

Coordinates: 40°14′N 4°11′W

Méntrida
- municipality
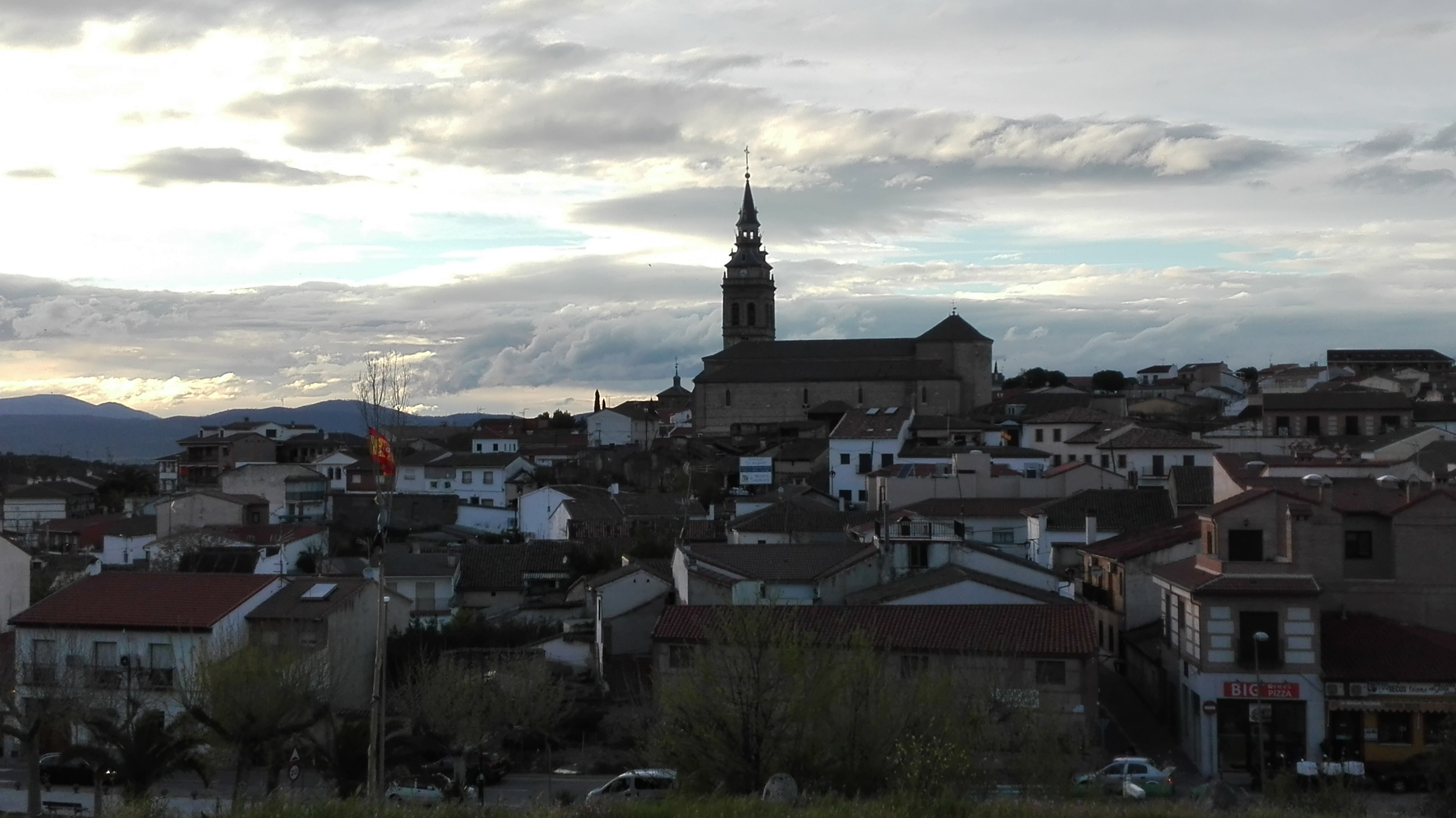

- Flag Coat of arms
- Interactive map of Méntrida
- Country: Spain
- Autonomous community: Castile-La Mancha
- Province: Toledo

Area
  - Total: 87 km^{2} (34 sq mi)
- Elevation: 560 m (1,840 ft)

Population (2025-01-01)
  - Total: 6,495
  - Density: 75/km^{2} (190/sq mi)
- Time zone: UTC+1 (CET)
  - Summer (DST): UTC+2 (CEST)
- Website: http://www.jccm.es/mentrida/

Méntrida is a municipality located in the province of Toledo, Castile-La Mancha, Spain. According to the 2006 census (INE), the municipality has a population of 3521 inhabitants.

Adscribed to the Alamín Castle, Méntrida depended on the Archbishop of Toledo from 1180 to 1436. After 1484 and up to the 19th century, it was part of the holdings of the Dukes of the Infantado.
