= Pentageia =

Pentageia: Πεντάγεια (Greek); Yeşilyurt (Turkish)
- Location within Cyprus
- Coordinates: 35°09′14″N 32°52′59″E
- Country (de jure): Cyprus
  - District: Nicosia District
- Country (de facto): Northern Cyprus
  - District: Lefke District

Population (2011)
  - Total: 1,218
- Time zone: UTC+2 (EET)
  - Summer (DST): UTC+3 (EEST)
- Climate: Csa

Pentageia (Greek: Πεντάγεια or Πεντάγια; Turkish: Yeşilyurt) is a village in Cyprus, west of Morphou and 5 km (3 mi) east of Karavostasi. De facto, it is under the control of Northern Cyprus.
