= Steni, Paphos =

Steni Στενή
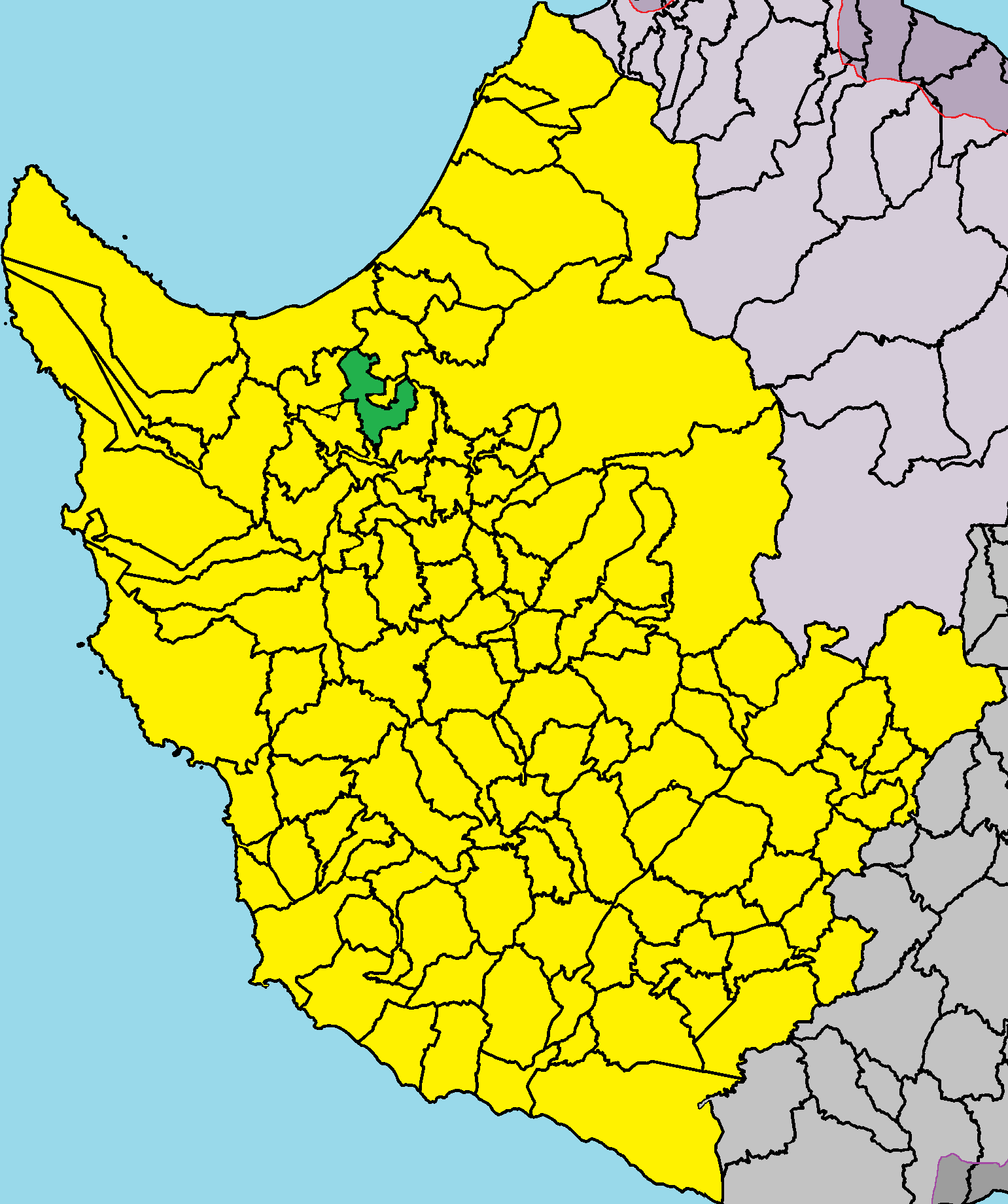
- Steni in Paphos District.

- Location in Cyprus
- Coordinates: 34°59′54″N 32°28′17″E
- Country: Cyprus
- District: Paphos District

Population (2001)
  - Total: 105
- Time zone: UTC+2 (EET)
  - Summer (DST): UTC+3 (EEST)
- Postal code: 6368
- Website: http://www.steni.org.cy/

Steni (Greek: Στενή) is a village in the Paphos District of Cyprus, located 6 km southeast of Polis Chrysochous.

In his book "Historic Cyprus" (second edition 1947), Rupert Gunnis (Inspector of Antiquities on the island at the time) writes:

"About two miles from the village lie the ruins of the rich and important Monastery of Chrysolakhourna. The original thirteenth-century church consists of a central nave and two side aisles ending in a semicircular apse. Over the west door was a small lancet window of two lights. In the sixteenth century, owing to an earthquake, the church was much remodelled. The west front was covered with a heavy buttress wall four feet thick at the base, which blocked the two entrances into the side aisle. The north wall was rebuilt, and the windows in the west and east end of the church were blocked up. All the paintings which remain are of the period of the rebuilding, save a figure of St. John the Baptist in the west end, and even this has been chipped to form a key for the later series of frescoes. The monastic buildings are of considerable size, but are now much ruined.

A number of Hellenic tombs surround the monastery, and the scattered marble columns and pillars suggest that there was perhaps a heathen temple here at some period.

Just below the church is a tiny valley shaded by giant oaks, and from a cleft in the rocks trickles a holy spring, which is frequented by those who suffer from ophthalmia. According to the local tradition, this monastery was once the resident of a bishop, and it is possible that during the Latin domination (note: the Kingdom of Cyprus) the Orthodox Bishop of Paphos was forced to reside here. The last Abbot is said to have been hanged by the Turks in 1821. Near Steni are the Turkish hamlets of St. Isidoros (note: Ayios Isidhoros, Paphos) and Myrimikoph; each still contains the ruined mediaeval church dating from before the time of the Turkish conquest."
