= El Granado =

Coordinates: 37°31′N 7°25′W

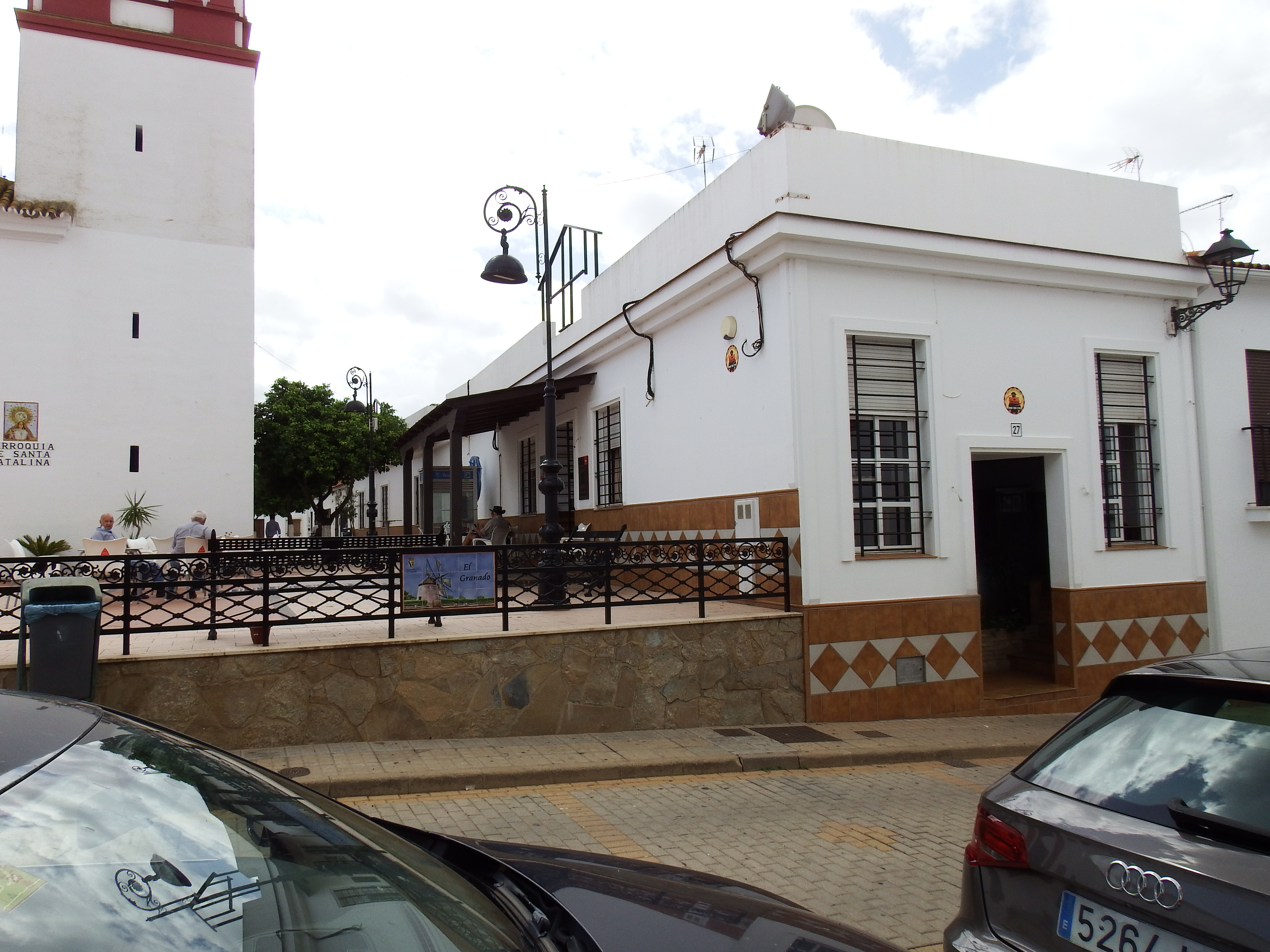

- Flag Coat of arms

- Location in Spain.
- Country: Spain
- Autonomous community: Andalusia
- Province: Huelva

Area
  - Total: 97.55 km^{2} (37.66 sq mi)
- Elevation: 133 m (436 ft)

Population (2025-01-01)
  - Total: 480
  - Density: 4.9/km^{2} (13/sq mi)
- Time zone: UTC+1 (CET)
  - Summer (DST): UTC+2 (CEST)
- Website: http://www.elgranado.es/es/

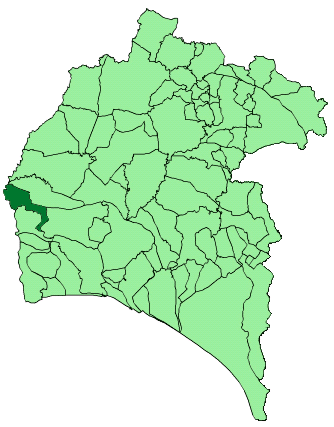
Map of El Granado, Huelva

El Granado is a town and municipality located in the province of Huelva, Spain. According to the 2025 municipal register, the municipality has a population of 480 inhabitants.

== Population ==
Population development
Year	1900	1920	1950	1970	1980	1990	2000	2010	2020
Population	799	852	1,093	896	783	696	642	570	519

== See also ==
- List of municipalities in Huelva
