= Agios Vasileios, Cyprus =

Agios Vasileios: Άγιος Βασίλειος (Greek); Türkeli (Turkish)
- Location in Cyprus
- Coordinates: 35°13′9″N 33°10′59″E
- Country (de jure): Cyprus
  - District: Nicosia District
- Country (de facto): Northern Cyprus
  - District: Lefkoşa District

Population (2011)
  - Total: 154
- Time zone: UTC+2 (EET)
  - Summer (DST): UTC+3 (EEST)

Agios Vasileios (Greek: Άγιος Βασίλειος; Turkish: Türkeli) is a village in Cyprus, 2 km south-east of Skylloura. De facto, it is under the control of Northern Cyprus.
