= Theodore Philes =

Byzantine noble and 13th-century governor of Thessalonica

Theodore Philes (Greek: Θεόδωρος Φιλῆς) was a Byzantine nobleman and governor of Thessalonica in the mid-13th century.

Theodore is the first notable member of the Philes family. He was appointed governor of Thessalonica by the Nicaean emperor John III Vatatzes sometime between 1248 and 1252, when the previous governor, Andronikos Palaiologos, died. This post, apparently designated with the title of "praetor", entailed a very wide remit, encompassing military, fiscal and judicial authority over the lands and cities of Macedonia that were in Nicaean hands.

During his governorship, Philes slighted the Nicaean heir-apparent, Theodore II Laskaris, who now became his avowed enemy. When Theodore II succeeded to the throne in 1254, Philes and another leading noble, Constantine Strategopoulos, were blinded at the emperor's orders for lèse-majesté. He was succeeded as praetor in Thessalonica by the historian George Akropolites.

Consequently Philes and his family became supporters of the aristocratic opposition around Michael Palaiologos, and after Theodore II's death in 1258 supported him in his bid for control of the empire against the regent, George Mouzalon. In 1259, Michael Palaiologos, now emperor, sent Philes on a diplomatic mission to the Epirote court of Michael II Komnenos Doukas, but achieved no success, reportedly due to Michael's arrogance.

Theodore Philes had one son, Alexios Philes, later megas domestikos.

== Sources ==
- Macrides, Ruth (2007). George Akropolites: The History – Introduction, Translation and Commentary. Oxford: Oxford University Press. ISBN 978-0-19-921067-1.
- Trapp, Erich (1991). "Philes". In Kazhdan, Alexander (ed.). The Oxford Dictionary of Byzantium. New York and Oxford: Oxford University Press. pp. 1650–1651. ISBN 978-0-19-504652-6.
- Trapp, Erich; Beyer, Hans-Veit; Kaplaneres, Sokrates; Leontiadis, Ioannis (1994). "29812. Φιλῆς Θεόδωρος". Prosopographisches Lexikon der Palaiologenzeit (in German). Vol. 12. Vienna: Verlag der Österreichischen Akademie der Wissenschaften.

Preceded by Andronikos Palaiologos	Governor-general (praetor) of Macedonia; 1248/52–1254	Succeeded by George Akropolites
