= Irene Angelina (daughter of Alexios III Angelos) =

Irene Angelina was a Byzantine princess, and the eldest daughter of Emperor Alexios III Angelos, and Euphrosyne Doukaina Kamatera. She was married to the sebastokrator Alexios Palaiologos, her father's appointed heir.

== Biography ==
Irene was born sometime before the accession of her father Alexios, who in 1195 staged a coup against his brother Isaac II and seized the imperial throne. By this time, she was already married to Andronikos Kontostephanos, an older noble who, according to Choniates, was a relative of her mother.

Andronikos Kontostephanos had died by 1196, having retired to a monastery shortly before. Around 1198, the emperor decided to marry the widowed Irene to the sebastokrator Alexios Palaiologos. Alexios III, who had no sons, planned to obtain an heir to the throne through this marriage in the person of his new son-in-law. Thus in the summer of 1199, Irene and Alexios Palaiologos were married, and Irene received the title of empress (basilissa) while Alexios received the title of Despot.

Irene also outlived her second husband who died in 1203. She retired to a monastery where she died at an unknown date.

== Issue and Legacy ==
The marriage of Irene and Alexios Palaiologos produced one daughter, Theodora Angelina Palaiologos, who in 1216 married the Grand Domestic Andronikos Palaiologos, they in turn, were the parents of Michael VIII Palaiologos, ths first emperor of the dynasty.

Through her daughter, Irene Angelina was an ancestor of every Byzantine emperor until the fall of the empire in 1453.
