= Theodora Angelina Palaiologina =

Mother of Michael VIII Palaiologos

- Spouse: Andronikos Palaiologos
- Children: Michael VIII Palaiologos; Irene Komnene Palaiologina; John Palaiologos
- Parents: Alexios Palaiologos (father); Irene Angelina (mother)
- Family: Palaiologos

Theodora Angelina Palaiologina (Greek: Θεοδώρα Άγγελίνα Παλαιολογίνα) was a Byzantine noblewoman and mother of the future Byzantine Emperor Michael VIII Palaiologos, the founder of the Palaiologan dynasty. She was the daughter of the despotes Alexios Palaiologos and Irene Komnene Angelina, the daughter of Alexios III Angelos and Euphrosyne Doukaina Kamatera.

== Family ==
She was married with Andronikos Palaiologos, the megas domestikos of the Empire of Nicaea. Theodora and Andronikos had four children:

- Maria Palaiologina (monastic name Martha), married with Nikephoros Tarchaneiotes.
- Irene Komnene Palaiologina (monastic name Eulogia), wife of John Kantakouzenos; mother of Anna, consort of Epirus and Maria Palaiologina Kantakouzene, Empress consort of Bulgaria.
- Michael VIII Palaiologos (1223 – 11 December 1282), first Byzantine Emperor of the Palaiologan dynasty.
- John Palaiologos (1225/1230 – 1272/1273 or 1274/1275), despotes and sebastokrator.

== Sources ==
- Cheynet, Jean-Claude; Vannier, Jean-François (1986). Études Prosopographiques (in French). Paris: Publications de la Sorbonne. ISBN 978-2-85944-110-4.
- Kazhdan, Alexander P. (1991). "Palaiologos". In Kazhdan, Alexander P. (ed.). The Oxford Dictionary of Byzantium. New York and Oxford: Oxford University Press. ISBN 978-0-19-504652-6.
- Macrides, Ruth (2007). George Akropolites: The History – Introduction, Translation and Commentary. Oxford: Oxford University Press. ISBN 978-0-19-921067-1.
