= Alexios Strategopoulos =

Byzantine general who recaptured Constantinople in 1261

Alexios Komnenos Strategopoulos
- Kaisar
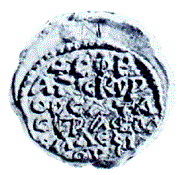
- Seal of Alexios Strategopoulos

Caesar of the Byzantine Empire
- Reign: 1259 – c. 1275
- Predecessor: Constantine Palaiologos
- Successor: Roger de Flor in 1305
- Emperors: Michael VIII Palaiologos & Andronikos II Palaiologos

Grand Domestic
- In office 1259
- Monarch: Michael VIII Palaiologos
- Preceded by: John Palaiologos (brother of Michael VIII)
- Succeeded by: Alexios Philes

Personal details
- Born: c. 1200
- Died: c. 1275

Military service
- Allegiance: (Byzantine Empire) Byzantine Empire; Empire of Nicaea (until 1261)
- Years of service: bef. 1252 – 1262
- Battles/wars: Epirote–Nicaean conflict (1257–59); Byzantine–Latin Wars

Alexios Komnenos Strategopoulos (Greek: Ἀλέξιος Κομνηνὸς Στρατηγόπουλος) was a Byzantine aristocrat and general who rose to the rank of megas domestikos and Caesar. Distantly related to the Komnenian dynasty, he appears in the sources already at an advanced age in the early 1250s, leading armies for the Empire of Nicaea against Epirus. After falling out of favour and being imprisoned by Theodore II Laskaris, Strategopoulos sided with the aristocrats around Michael VIII Palaiologos, and supported him in his rise to the throne after Theodore II's death in 1258.

He participated in the Pelagonia campaign in 1259, going on to capture Epirus, but his successes were undone in the next year and he was captured by the Epirotes. Released after a few months, he led the unexpected reconquest of Constantinople from the Latin Empire in July 1261, restoring the Byzantine Empire. He was captured again by the Epirotes in the next year and spent several years in captivity in Italy, before being released. He retired from public affairs and died in the early 1270s.

== Origin and family ==
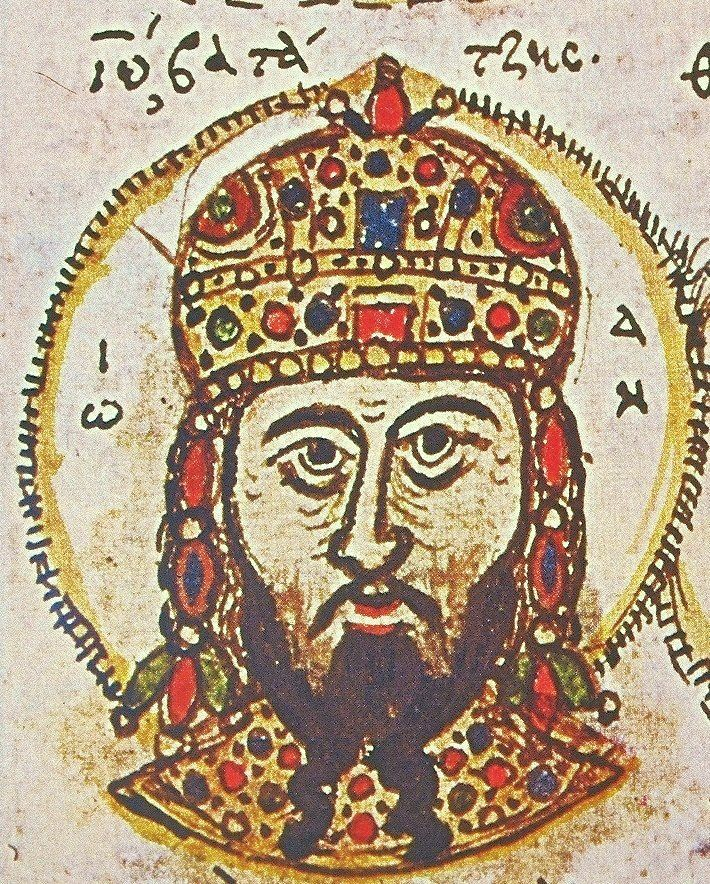
Emperor John III Doukas Vatatzes, under whom Strategopoulos began his military career, and whose niece married his own son, Constantine

Nothing is known of the early years of Alexios Strategopoulos's life, nor of his exact descent, except that he belonged to the nobility: other Strategopouloi are mentioned in the 11th and 12th centuries; a John Strategopoulos became megas logothetes (chief minister) of the Empire of Nicaea c. 1216, although his relation with Alexios is unknown. Strategopoulos was apparently related to the illustrious Komnenian dynasty, as a seal dated to c. 1255 has been found bearing the inscription "Alexios Strategopoulos from the Komnenos family".

Two later sources, Gennadios Scholarios in the 15th century and the 16th-century scholar Pseudo-Sphrantzes, report that he was a descendant of the Caesar Nikephoros Melissenos and Eudokia Komnene, a sister of the Byzantine emperor Alexios I Komnenos (r. 1081–1118), through their son John Komnenos. Pseudo-Sphrantzes asserts that Strategopoulos was the great-grandson of John Komnenos, and that he derived his surname of "Strategopoulos" from the wife of his grandfather Alexios. Scholarios on the other makes John Komnenos his great-great-grandfather, and claims that it was only Strategopoulos's alleged father, Theodosios, who was nicknamed "Strategopoulos" ("little general") by the Nicaean emperor John III Doukas Vatatzes (r. 1222–1254) for his military acumen.

The date of his birth is likewise unknown, but as he is called an "old man" in 1258, it must have been around the turn of the 13th century. Of his own family, it is known that he had one son, Constantine, who according to George Pachymeres was married to a daughter of the sebastokrator Isaac Doukas Vatatzes, brother of John III Doukas Vatatzes.

== Early career ==
Alexios Strategopoulos first appears in the chronicles in 1252–53, during the reign of John III Doukas Vatatzes, when he led a detachment of the army sent to plunder the areas of Nicaea's Greek rival, the Despotate of Epirus, around Lake Ostrovo. In 1254, he was based at Serres in Macedonia, and in the next year he participated, along with megas primmikerios Constantine Tornikes, in a campaign against the fortress of Tzepaina in the western Rhodope Mountains. The campaign failed with heavy losses. The contemporary historian George Akropolites puts the blame on the bad generalship shown by the two commanders, who failed to reconnoitre properly the Bulgarian forces opposing them. As a result, their army broke and fled leaving behind their equipment and horses "to the Bulgarian shepherds and swineherds". This failure enraged the Nicaean emperor Theodore II Laskaris (r. 1254–1258), who removed both from their offices. In addition, probably because of Strategopoulos's close connection to the aristocratic faction around Michael Palaiologos, his son Constantine was blinded for lèse-majesté, and Strategopoulos himself was imprisoned some time later.

Strategopoulos was probably released from prison immediately after the death of Theodore II Laskaris in August 1258. Along with the other heads of the aristocratic families, he was a prominent supporter of Michael Palaiologos's successful coup against George Mouzalon on 25 August, resulting in Palaiologos's assumption of the regency for Theodore II's under-age son, John IV Laskaris. In the same year he accompanied the army that was sent, under Michael's brother, the megas domestikos John Palaiologos, to confront the Epirote designs on Macedonia. When Michael Palaiologos was proclaimed emperor in early 1259, John Palaiologos was promoted to sebastokrator, and Strategopoulos succeeded him as megas domestikos. In 1259 he participated in the campaign that led to the decisive victory over an Epirote–Sicilian–Achaean alliance at the Battle of Pelagonia, where, along with Nikephoros Rimpsas, he took captive the 400-strong detachment of German knights sent by King Manfred of Sicily to aid the Epirotes.

After the Nicaean victory, John Palaiologos invaded Thessaly, while Alexios Strategopoulos and John Raoul Petraliphas were tasked with reducing Epirus proper. Strategopoulos and Petraliphas crossed the Pindus Mountains, bypassed Ioannina, which they left under siege, and captured the Epirote capital, Arta, forcing the Despot Michael II to flee to the island of Cephalonia. At Arta they found and released many Nicaean prisoners, including the historian George Akropolites. For this success, Strategopoulos was raised to the rank of Caesar. In the next year, however, the Nicaean successes were largely undone: Despot Michael with his sons and an Italian mercenary army landed at Arta, and the Epirote population rallied to his cause. The Epirote army clashed with Strategopoulos's forces at the Trikorfon pass near Nafpaktos; the Nicaean army was routed, and Strategopoulos himself captured.

== Recapture of Constantinople ==
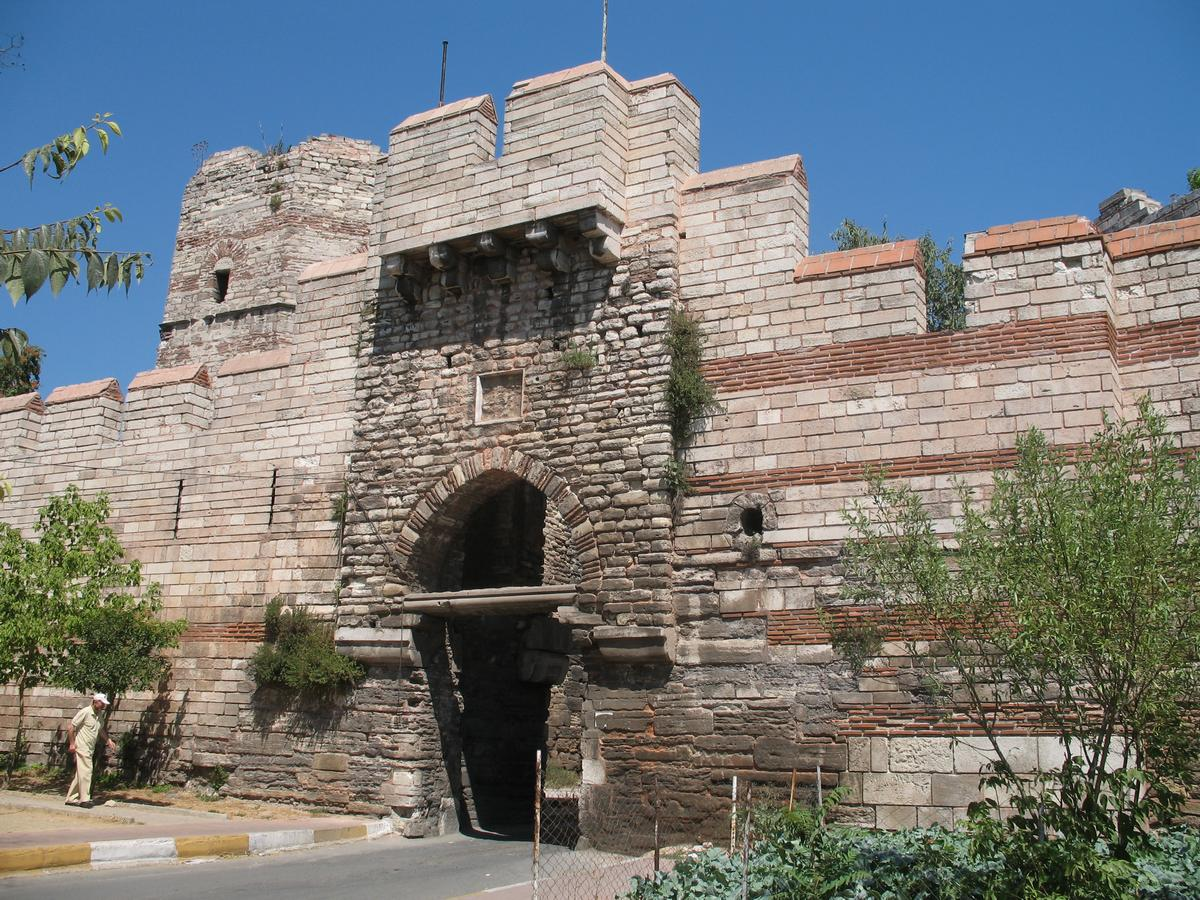
The Gate of the Spring (Pege) or Selymbria Gate, through which Strategopoulos and his men entered Constantinople on 25 July 1261

Despite these reverses, the victory at Pelagonia left Michael VIII free to pursue his most coveted prize: Constantinople, the capital of the Byzantine Empire, which had been the seat of the Latin Empire since its capture by the Fourth Crusade in 1204. To this end, Michael concluded an alliance with Genoa in March 1261, and in July 1261, as the one-year truce concluded after the previous failed Nicaean attack was nearing its end, Strategopoulos, recently released from Epirote custody, was sent with a small advance force of 800 soldiers to keep a watch on the Bulgarians and spy out the defences of the Latins.

When the Nicaean force reached the village of Selymbria, some 30 miles (48 km) west of Constantinople, they learned from some independent local farmers (thelematarioi) that the entire Latin garrison, as well as the Venetian fleet, were absent conducting a raid against the Nicaean island of Daphnousia. Strategopoulos initially hesitated to take advantage of the situation, since his small force might be destroyed if the Latin army returned too soon, and because he would exceed the emperor's orders, but eventually decided he could not squander such a golden opportunity to retake the city.

On the night of 24/25 July 1261, Strategopoulos and his men approached the city walls and hid at a monastery near the Gate of the Spring. Strategopoulos sent a detachment of his men, led by some of the thelematarioi, to make their way to the city through a secret passage. They attacked the walls from the inside, surprised the guards and opened the gate, giving the Nicaean force entry into the city. The Latins were taken completely unaware, and after a short struggle, the Nicaeans gained control of the land walls. As news of this spread across the city, the Latin inhabitants, from Emperor Baldwin II downwards, hurriedly rushed to the harbours of the Golden Horn, hoping to escape by ship. At the same time, Strategopoulos's men set fire to the Venetian buildings and warehouses along the coast to prevent them from landing there. Thanks to the timely arrival of the returning Venetian fleet, many of the Latins managed to evacuate to the Latin-held parts of Greece, but the city was lost for good. The recapture of Constantinople signalled the restoration of the Byzantine Empire, and on 15 August, the day of the Dormition of the Theotokos, Emperor Michael VIII entered the city in triumph and was crowned at the Hagia Sophia. The rights of John IV Laskaris were brushed aside, and the young man was blinded and imprisoned.

Strategopoulos was honoured by Michael with a triumphal procession through the city, and by allowing his name to be commemorated in the church services for a year alongside the Emperor and the Patriarch.

== Later life and death ==
After this feat that earned him fame and glory, in 1262 Strategopoulos was appointed again to lead an army against Epirus. This time, however, he was defeated and captured by Despot Nikephoros Doukas, who sent him to Manfred in Italy. He was ransomed in 1265 in exchange for Manfred's sister Constance II of Hohenstaufen, widow of John Vatatzes. Alexios Strategopoulos is last mentioned in a document from December 1270 in which he made a donation to the Makrinitissa Monastery near Volos, and died sometime between 1271 and 1275, probably at Constantinople.

== Sources ==
- Bartusis, Mark C. (1997). The Late Byzantine Army: Arms and Society, 1204–1453. University of Pennsylvania Press. ISBN 0-8122-1620-2.
- Macrides, Ruth (2007). George Akropolites: The History – Introduction, Translation and Commentary. Oxford: Oxford University Press. ISBN 978-0-19-921067-1.
- Nicol, Donald M. (1993) [1972]. The Last Centuries of Byzantium, 1261–1453 (Second ed.). Cambridge: Cambridge University Press. ISBN 978-0-521-43991-6.
- Trapp, Erich; Beyer, Hans-Veit; Kaplaneres, Sokrates; Leontiadis, Ioannis (1991). "26894. Στρατηγόπουλος, Ἀλέξιος Κομνηνός". Prosopographisches Lexikon der Palaiologenzeit (in German). Vol. 11. Vienna: Verlag der Österreichischen Akademie der Wissenschaften. ISBN 3-7001-3003-1.
- Varzos, Konstantinos (1984). Η Γενεαλογία των Κομνηνών [The Genealogy of the Komnenoi] (PDF) (in Greek). Vol. A1. Thessaloniki: Centre for Byzantine Studies, University of Thessaloniki.
- Vougiouklaki, Pinelopi (27 November 2003). "Alexios Strategopoulos". Encyclopedia of the Hellenic World, Asia Minor. Foundation of the Hellenic World. Archived from the original on 9 October 2011.

Preceded by John Palaiologos	Megas domestikos of the Empire of Nicaea; 1259	Succeeded by Alexios Philes
