= Alexios Philes =

Alexios Philes (Greek: Ἀλέξιος Φιλῆς) was a Byzantine nobleman and general of the 13th century.

He was the son of Theodore Philes, governor of Thessalonica and the first prominent member of the Philes family. Alexios married Maria Palaiologina Kantakouzene, the second daughter of John Kantakouzenos and Irene-Eulogia, the sister of Emperor Michael VIII Palaiologos (r. 1259–1282). In 1259, the Byzantine emperor appointed Philes as grand domestic (commander-in-chief of the army) in succession to Alexios Strategopoulos, who had been promoted to Caesar after his victories against the Despotate of Epirus.

In 1262/1263, Philes was dispatched along with the parakoimomenos John Makrenos to the Morea, in an expedition against the Principality of Achaea headed by the sebastokrator Constantine Palaiologos. The Byzantine forces were defeated at the Battle of Prinitza, and after the sebastokrator departed for Constantinople, Philes and Makrenos were left in charge. They too, however, were defeated and captured by the Achaeans at the Battle of Makryplagi. Philes died in captivity soon after.

== Sources ==
- Geanakoplos, Deno John (1959). Emperor Michael Palaeologus and the West, 1258–1282: A Study in Byzantine-Latin Relations. Cambridge, Massachusetts: Harvard University Press. OCLC 1011763434.
- Guilland, Rodolphe (1967). Recherches sur les Institutions Byzantines, Tome I (in French). Berlin, Germany: Akademie-Verlag.
- Trapp, Erich (1991). "Philes". In Kazhdan, Alexander (ed.). The Oxford Dictionary of Byzantium. Oxford and New York: Oxford University Press. pp. 1650–1651. ISBN 0-19-504652-8.

| Preceded by Alexios Strategopoulos | Grand domestic of the Empire of Nicaea and the Byzantine Empire (after 1261); 1259–1263/4 | Unknown Title next held by Michael Tarchaneiotes |
