= Alexios Palaiologos (despot) =

13th-century Byzantine nobleman

Alexios Palaiologos (Greek: Ἀλέξιος Παλαιολόγος; died 1203) was a Byzantine nobleman, the son-in-law of Emperor Alexios III Angelos (r. 1195–1203) and his heir apparent from 1199 until his death. Throughout this time, he was actively involved in the suppression of several revolts and riots against the emperor. Through his daughter, he became one of the progenitors of the Palaiologan dynasty (1261–1453).

== Life ==
Although the Palaiologos family was wealthy and mostly known for serving as civil and military officials under the Komnenian emperors, Alexios's own origins are obscure. Alexios's father was the sebastos and megas hetaireiarches George Palaiologos, the son or grandson of Alexios I Komnenos's staunchest supporter, George Palaiologos. Through his grandmother, Alexios shared in the blood of the Komnenian house. In 1199, Alexios was chosen by Emperor Alexios III, who was without male offspring, to wed his eldest daughter, Irene Angelina. She was a widow of Andronikos Kontostephanos, and Alexios Palaiologos was forced to divorce his own beautiful first wife (whose name is unknown) to marry her. The wedding took place in the spring of 1199 and was accompanied by lavish celebrations. Alexios thus became the imperial heir-apparent, and was elevated to the rank of despot. At the same time, the emperor's second daughter Anna, also a widow, was wed to Theodore Laskaris, the future founder of the Empire of Nicaea.

Shortly afterwards, both imperial sons-in-law were sent alongside general Manuel Kamytzes against the rebel Ivanko in Thrace. During this campaign, in the siege of Kritzimos, Alexios's father George was killed. The campaign failed when the Byzantine force was trapped in an ambush and Kamytzes was captured. This success emboldened Ivanko, who now claimed the imperial title. In spring 1200, Alexios III pretended to be willing to begin negotiations, and sent Alexios Palaiologos to meet the rebel. Alexios gave solemn promises of safety, but when Ivanko appeared in the imperial camp, he was arrested and executed. In February of the same year, Alexios had been called upon to help with the riots that broke out in Constantinople in protest against the embezzlement of charitable donations by the prison warden John Lagos. A large mob had taken control of the capital's prisons and opened them, and battled the guards of the emperor, who was away at Chrysopolis. Alexios Palaiologos led troops into the city and suppressed the revolt after inflicting heavy casualties on the populace.

In July 1201, Alexios was instrumental in the suppression of the attempted coup by John Komnenos the Fat. After the rebels had seized control of most of the Great Palace, Alexios was sent by the emperor with troops and boats from the Blachernae to the eastern shore of the city. There they met up with the Great Palace's guard, and cleared the palace and the Hippodrome of the supporters of the usurper, who was caught and beheaded. In February 1201 or 1202, Alexios was injured when the imperial tent collapsed during an earthquake, but in the same summer he led the campaign that subdued the rebellion of governor John Spyridonakes in eastern Macedonia, forcing the latter to flee to Bulgaria.

Alexios died at a relatively young age in 1203, of natural causes according to Theodore Skoutariotes. His death occurred before the deposition and flight of Alexios III in the face of the siege of Constantinople by the Fourth Crusade.

== Family ==
Aside from his father George, Alexios had an unnamed aunt, who married John Bryennios, and an uncle, the sebastos Constantine. The name of his mother is not known, nor does it appear that he had siblings. From his marriage with Irene Angelina (daughter of Alexios III Angelos) he had one daughter, Theodora, who married the grand domestic Andronikos Palaiologos, the son of the megas doux Alexios Palaiologos (from a different branch of the Palaiologos line) and of Irene Komnene. They had numerous children, the most prominent of whom was Michael VIII Palaiologos, who became emperor of Nicaea in 1259 and restored the Byzantine Empire in 1261, founding the Palaiologan dynasty.

== Sources ==
- Brand, Charles M. (1968). Byzantium Confronts the West, 1180–1204. Cambridge, Massachusetts: Harvard University Press. LCCN 67-20872.
- Cheynet, Jean-Claude (1996). Pouvoir et Contestations à Byzance (963–1210) (in French). Paris: Publications de la Sorbonne. ISBN 978-2-85944-168-5.
- Kazhdan, Alexander, ed. (1991). The Oxford Dictionary of Byzantium. Oxford and New York: Oxford University Press. ISBN 0-19-504652-8.
- Macrides, Ruth (2007). George Akropolites: The History – Introduction, Translation and Commentary. Oxford: Oxford University Press. ISBN 978-0-19-921067-1.
- Vannier, Jean-François (1986). "Les premiers Paléologues. Étude généalogique et prosopographique" [The First Palaiologoi. Genealogical and Prosopographical Study]. In Cheynet, Jean-Claude; Vannier, Jean-François (eds.). Études Prosopographiques [Prosopographic Studies] (in French). Paris: Publications de la Sorbonne. pp. 123–186. ISBN 978-2-85944-110-4. OCLC 575241198.
