= Irene Komnene Palaiologina =

Sister of the Byzantine emperor Michael VIII Palaiologos

Irene Komnene Palaiologina (Greek: Εἰρήνη Κομνηνή Παλαιολογίνα, romanized: Eirēnē Komnēne Palaiologína; c. 1218–1284), after c. 1261 known by her monastic name as Eulogia (Εὐλογία), was an elder sister of the Byzantine emperor Michael VIII Palaiologos. Originally close to the emperor, her opposition to the Union of the Churches in 1273 led to their estrangement, and even to intrigues by Irene against Michael involving foreign rulers. As a result, she was imprisoned for the remainder of his reign. After Michael's death, she encouraged Andronikos II Palaiologos to repudiate the Union.

== Life ==
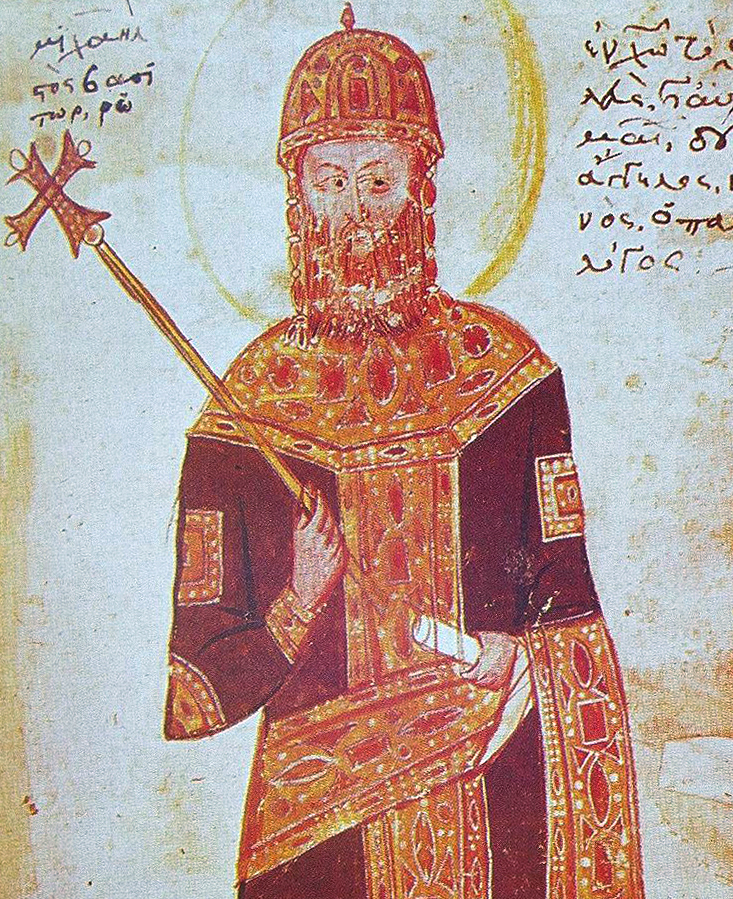
Irene's brother, the Byzantine emperor Michael VIII Palaiologos

Irene was born around 1218, the second daughter of the megas domestikos Andronikos Palaiologos and Theodora Angelina Palaiologina. Around 1240, she married John Kantakouzenos Komnenos Angelos, who died some time before 1257. After her husband's death, Irene became a nun and assumed the monastic name Eulogia. It is not known when exactly this happened, but she was a nun by 1261.

Irene was close with her younger brother, Michael VIII Palaiologos, on whom she exerted great influence. The historian George Pachymeres reports on how she used to lull Michael to sleep with the assurance that he would be the future emperor who would recover Constantinople from the Latin Empire; in 1261, she was the one who brought him the news of the reconquest of Constantinople.

Pachymeres also stresses Irene's political influence, including on the matter of the legitimate emperor, the young John IV Laskaris. In order to safeguard the rights of Michael's son, Andronikos II Palaiologos, Irene urged her brother to have Laskaris sidelined completely. Laskaris was eventually blinded. She also played a role in the disgrace, and subsequent blinding, of the general John Makrenos. The marriage of her daughter Maria to the Bulgarian ruler Constantine Tikh in 1268/69 further enhanced her political position.

However, she rejected Michael's espousal of the Union of the Churches in 1273, and became a leader of the anti-Unionist faction at court. Her relationship with her brother turned to bitter hostility. Michael banished her to the fortress of Gregorios in the Gulf of Nicomedia. Such was the enmity between the two, that after Michael died, Irene forbade his widow Theodora to pray for him. Irene also did not hesitate to involve her son-in-law in the anti-Unionist cause: with the aid of her daughter, she incited Tikh against Michael, and even tried, without success, to form an alliance against Byzantium between Bulgaria and the Mamluk Sultanate.

After Michael died in 1282, Andronikos II Palaiologos repudiated the Union thanks, in part, to the influence of his aunt. Irene died in early December 1284.

== Family ==
Irene's husband John Kantakouzenos Komnenos Angelos is identified by Donald Nicol with the pinkernes John Kantakouzenos. Known children of this couple include:

- Theodora, who married (1) George Mouzalon, (2) John Raoul Petraliphas
- Maria, wife of Constantine Tikh, Tsar of Bulgaria
- Anna, wife of Nikephoros I Komnenos Doukas
- Eugenia, wife of Syrgiannes, and mother of Syrgiannes Palaiologos
- a possible fifth daughter, name unknown, who married Theodore Mouzalon

== Sources ==
- Cheynet, Jean-Claude; Vannier, Jean-François (1986). Études Prosopographiques (in French). Paris: Publications de la Sorbonne. ISBN 978-2-85944-110-4.
- Geanakoplos, Deno John (1959). Emperor Michael Palaeologus and the West, 1258–1282: A Study in Byzantine-Latin Relations. Cambridge, Massachusetts: Harvard University Press.
- Kazhdan, Alexander (1991). "Palaiologos". In Kazhdan, Alexander (ed.). The Oxford Dictionary of Byzantium. Oxford and New York: Oxford University Press. pp. 1557–1560. ISBN 0-19-504652-8.
- Macrides, Ruth (2007). George Akropolites: The History – Introduction, Translation and Commentary. Oxford: Oxford University Press. ISBN 978-0-19-921067-1.
- Nicol, Donald (1968). The Byzantine family of Kantakouzenos (Cantacuzenus) ca. 1100-1460: A Genealogical and Prosopographical Study. Dumbarton Oaks studies 11. Washington, DC: Dumbarton Oaks Center for Byzantine Studies. OCLC 390843.
- Radic, Radivoj (2002). "Eirene Palaiologina". Encyclopedia of the Hellenic World, Asia Minor. Athens: Foundation of the Hellenic World.
- Trapp, Erich; Beyer, Hans-Veit; Walther, Rainer; Sturm-Schnabl, Katja; Kislinger, Ewald; Leontiadis, Ioannis; Kaplaneres, Sokrates (1976–1996). Prosopographisches Lexikon der Palaiologenzeit (in German). Vienna: Verlag der Österreichischen Akademie der Wissenschaften. ISBN 3-7001-3003-1.
