= Andronikos Palaiologos (megas domestikos) =

Megas domestikos of the Empire of Nicaea

Andronikos Komnenos Palaiologos
- Born: c. 1190
- Died: 1248/52
- Office: megas domestikos of the Empire of Nicaea; Praitor of Macedonia
- Spouse: Theodora Angelina Palaiologina
- Children: Michael VIII Palaiologos; Irene Komnene Palaiologina; John Palaiologos; Constantine Palaiologos
- Parents: Alexios Palaiologos (father); Irene Komnene Kantakouzene (mother)
- Relatives: Alexios Palaiologos (father-in-law)
- Family: Palaiologos

Andronikos Doukas Komnenos Palaiologos (Greek: Ἀνδρόνικος Δούκας Κομνηνός Παλαιολόγος, romanized: Andrónikos Doukas Komnēnós Palaiológos; c. 1190 – 1248/52), was a megas domestikos (commander-in-chief) of the Empire of Nicaea and the father of the Byzantine emperor Michael VIII Palaiologos, the founder of the Palaiologan dynasty.

== Life ==
Andronikos was the son of the megas doux Alexios Palaiologos and Irene Komnene, grandson of Michael Palaiologos Doukas, and great-great-grandson of the family's founder, George Palaiologos. He was probably born about 1190, and had another brother, Michael, who was apparently the elder of the two.

Nothing is known of his early life. He was named megas domestikos (commander-in-chief) of the Empire of Nicaea, but sources differ on when and by whom: Nikephoros Gregoras records that this was done by Theodore I Laskaris (r. 1204–1222), but George Akropolites asserts this was done by Theodore I's successor, John III Doukas Vatatzes (r. 1222–1254) soon after his accession. Modern historians generally consider the latter more probable. In 1224 Andronikos was sent to the region of the Scamander river, just recovered from the Latin Empire, in order to organize its administration as exisotes. This was probably before he was made megas domestikos. In 1233, he was sent as head of the expedition against the semi-independent ruler of Rhodes, the Caesar Leo Gabalas, whom he forced to acknowledge Nicaean suzerainty.

In 1241, Andronikos followed John III Vatatztes in his campaigns in Macedonia, and the siege of Thessalonica. The campaign was cut short, however, due to the Mongol invasion of Asia Minor, forcing Vatatzes to content himself with the recognition of his authority by the city's ruler, John Komnenos Doukas, who had formerly claimed the imperial title for himself. In December 1246, following the final capture of Thessalonica, Andronikos was left behind in the city as its governor and as governor-general (referred to as "praitor" in the sources) of all newly gained Nicaean possessions in Macedonia, while Vatatzes returned to Asia Minor. During his tenure, his eldest son, the future emperor Michael VIII Palaiologos, came to serve under him in the cities of Serres and Melenikon.

The date of Andronikos' death is unknown. Traditionally it has been dated to 1247, since Akropolites states that it was shortly after his appointment to Thessalonica, but more recent research shows that he died some time between 1248 and 1252. He was succeeded as megas domestikos by his son-in-law Nikephoros Tarchaneiotes, and as governor-general in Thessalonica by Theodore Philes.

== Family ==
In c. 1213, he married Theodora. Theodora was of illustrious lineage as the daughter of the despot Alexios Palaiologos and Irene Komnene Angelina, the eldest daughter of the Byzantine emperor Alexios III Angelos. Until his death in 1203, the despot Alexios Palaiologos was also the heir-apparent to the sonless Alexios III.

Together, the couple had at least four children: Maria (born c. 1214/5), Irene (c. 1218), Michael (1224/5) and John (after 1225). After Theodora's death, Andronikos remarried, but the name of his second wife is unknown. With her he had another son, Constantine (c. 1230). With one of his two wives, Andronikos also had a third daughter, who married Genoese admiral Benedetto I Zaccaria, but whose name remains unknown.

== Sources ==
- Guilland, Rodolphe (1967). "Le Grand Domestique". Recherches sur les institutions byzantines [Studies on the Byzantine Institutions]. Berliner byzantinische Arbeiten 35 (in French). Vol. I. Berlin and Amsterdam: Akademie-Verlag & Adolf M. Hakkert. pp. 405–425. OCLC 878894516.
- Kazhdan, Alexander (1991). "Palaiologos". In Kazhdan, Alexander (ed.). The Oxford Dictionary of Byzantium. Oxford and New York: Oxford University Press. pp. 1557–1560. ISBN 0-19-504652-8.
- Macrides, Ruth (2007). George Akropolites: The History – Introduction, Translation and Commentary. Oxford: Oxford University Press. ISBN 978-0-19-921067-1.
- Vannier, Jean-François (1986). "Les premiers Paléologues. Étude généalogique et prosopographique" [The First Palaiologoi. Genealogical and Prosopographical Study]. In Cheynet, Jean-Claude; Vannier, Jean-François (eds.). Études Prosopographiques [Prosopographic Studies] (in French). Paris: Publications de la Sorbonne. pp. 123–186. ISBN 978-2-85944-110-4. OCLC 575241198.

Unknown	Megas domestikos of the Empire of Nicaea ca. 1224 – 1248/52	Succeeded by Nikephoros Tarchaneiotes
Preceded by John Komnenos Doukas as Despot in Thessalonica	Governor-general of Macedonia; 1246 – 1248/52	Succeeded by Theodore Philes
