= Nikephoros Tarchaneiotes =

Byzantine general (died c. 1266)

- Νικηφόρος Ταρχανειώτης
- Died: Before 1266
- Military career
- Allegiance: Byzantine Empire
- Service years: 1237–before 1266
- Rank: Megas Domestikos

Nikephoros Tarchaneiotes (Greek: Νικηφόρος Ταρχανειώτης) was a 13th-century Byzantine aristocrat and general.

== Biography ==
Nikephoros Tarchaneiotes was a scion of the Tarchaneiotes family, who were prominent members of the Byzantine military aristocracy since the late 10th century. Nikephoros first appears in the reign of John III Vatatzes (r. 1221–1254), who named him his epi tes trapezes and in 1237 gave him command of the recently gained and strategically important fortress of Tzouroulos in Thrace. From this post, Tarchaneiotes successfully defended the fortress against a combined Latin-Bulgarian assault in the same year. Tarchaneiotes later accompanied the Emperor on his campaign (in 1241) that took the city of Thessaloniki. Considered, according to George Akropolites, a skillful general, by 1252 he was placed as acting megas domestikos of the army, succeeding his deceased father-in-law Andronikos Palaiologos. In this capacity, he took part in Vatatzes's last campaign, in 1252–1253 against the Despotate of Epirus.

Tarchaneiotes remained acting megas domestikos into the first part of Theodore II Laskaris's reign (1254–1258), when the post was conferred onto the new emperor's favourites, the Mouzalon brothers Andronikos and George. Being related to the Palaiologoi by marriage, he supported the rise of his brother-in-law Michael VIII Palaiologos (r. 1259–1282) to the throne. He was rewarded with the restoration to the rank of megas domestikos (circa 1260), while his sons too received high state offices. Given that his second wife became a nun circa 1266, he may have died before that date.

== Family ==
Tarchaneiotes was married twice, first to a daughter of the protostrator Andronikos Doukas Aprenos, and secondly to Maria-Martha Palaiologina, the eldest sister of Michael VIII Palaiologos.

From his second marriage he had four children:

- Theodora Tarchaneiotissa, who married Basil Kaballarios and later the megas stratopedarches Baladionites. She later became a nun with the name of Theodosia.
- Michael Tarchaneiotes, protovestiarios and notable general. He won a major victory against the Angevins at the Siege of Berat (1280–1281), and died in 1283/1284 from disease whilst on campaign.
- Andronikos Tarchaneiotes, megas konostaulos and governor of Adrianople. He defected to his father-in-law John I Doukas of Thessaly.
- John Tarchaneiotes, general in Asia Minor against the Turks.

== Sources ==
- Bartusis, Mark C. (1997). The Late Byzantine Army: Arms and Society 1204–1453. Philadelphia, Pennsylvania: University of Pennsylvania Press. ISBN 0-8122-1620-2.
- Kazhdan, Alexander, ed. (1991). The Oxford Dictionary of Byzantium. Oxford and New York: Oxford University Press. ISBN 0-19-504652-8.
- Macrides, Ruth (2007). George Akropolites: The History – Introduction, Translation and Commentary. Oxford: Oxford University Press. ISBN 978-0-19-921067-1.
- Nicol, Donald M. (1993) [1972]. The Last Centuries of Byzantium, 1261–1453 (Second ed.). Cambridge: Cambridge University Press. ISBN 978-0-521-43991-6.

Preceded by Andronikos Palaiologos	Megas domestikos of the Empire of Nicaea; 1248/52–1254	Succeeded by George Mouzalon
