= Exisotes =

Fiscal official in the Byzantine Empire

Exisōtēs (Greek: ἐξισώτης) was a fiscal official in the last centuries of the Byzantine Empire.

Its functions were similar to those of the earlier epoptes, along with whom it is often mentioned in the 11th centuries: the exisōsis (ἐξίσωσις, "equalization"), i.e. the fiscal survey and revision of the amount of tax owed by individuals. The distinction between the exisōtēs and the apographeus is likewise unclear, although the two functions are often documented as being held in tandem, and tax officials are recorded as carrying out both exisōsis and apographē.
