= George Mouzalon =

Byzantine official (c. 1220 – 1258)

- Born: c. 1220; Adramyttium, Empire of Nicaea
- Died: 25 August 1258 (aged 37–38); Magnesia, Empire of Nicaea
- Occupation: Government official

George Mouzalon (Greek: Γεώργιος Μουζάλων, romanized: Geōrgios Mouzalōn; c. 1220 – 25 August 1258) was a high official of the Empire of Nicaea under Theodore II Laskaris (r. 1254–1258).

Of humble origin, he became Theodore's companion in childhood and was raised to high state office upon the latter's assumption of power. This caused great resentment from the aristocracy, which had monopolized high offices and opposed Theodore's policies. Shortly before Theodore's death in 1258, he was appointed regent of Theodore's under-age son John IV Laskaris (r. 1258–1261). He was assassinated only a few days later by soldiers, as the result of a conspiracy led by the nobles under the soon-to-be emperor Michael VIII Palaiologos (r. 1259–1282).

== Biography ==
=== Early life and service under Theodore II ===
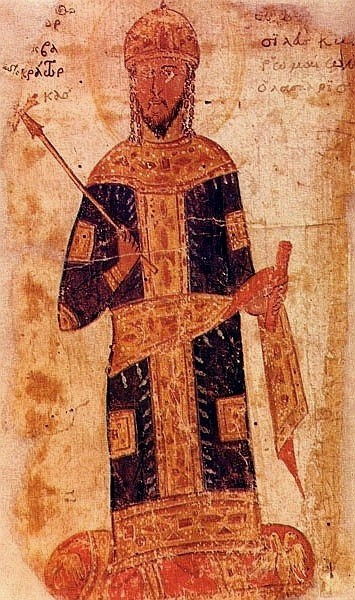
Emperor Theodore II Laskaris (r. 1254–1258), George Mouzalon's friend and patron

The Mouzalon family is first attested in the 11th century, but produced few notable members until the mid-13th century, with the exception of Nicholas IV Mouzalon, Patriarch of Constantinople in 1147–1151. George Mouzalon was born at Adramyttium on the western Anatolian coast in c. 1220. His family was considered low-born, but he and his brothers became the childhood friends of the future Theodore II Laskaris, being raised with him in the palace as his paidopouloi (παιδόπουλοι, "pages"). It is assumed that they were also educated along with Theodore, sharing his classes under the scholar Nikephoros Blemmydes. There were also at least two sisters, one of whom was later married to a member of the Hagiotheodorites family.

When Theodore became emperor in November 1254, he raised the Mouzalones to the highest state offices: George was made megas domestikos (commander-in-chief of the army) while two of his brothers, Andronikos and Theodore (the eldest brother), were made protovestiarios (grand chamberlain) and protokynegos (grand huntsman) respectively. According to the contemporary chroniclers, the emperor loved George "above all others"; in some letters he calls him "son" and "brother". During Theodore's reign, George was the Emperor's senior minister and his most trusted advisor. Little is known, however, about his personal involvement in the governance of the state, except for his participation in the council convened to discuss the proper reaction to the invasion of Nicaea's Macedonian holdings by the Bulgarians after the death of Theodore's father, John III Doukas Vatatzes. George Mouzalon supported the majority opinion that Theodore himself should campaign against the invaders. During Theodore's absence on campaign in 1255, George was left behind as regent of the state. Upon his return, Theodore raised George further, naming him protosebastos and protovestiarios and instituting the new title of megas stratopedarches for him. Andronikos Mouzalon succeeded George as megas domestikos. It was an extremely high honour: the combined title "protosebastos and protovestiarios" was normally conferred only to close kinsmen of the emperor, while the offices of protovestiarios and megas domestikos had always until then been the preserve of aristocratic families.

The elevation of the Mouzalones was not only a mark of personal affection or favour, but also in line with Theodore's policies, which aimed to curb the influence and independence of the powerful nobility. The appointment of low-born "new men" to such high posts, and Theodore's often harsh and arbitrary treatment of the nobles, aroused the ire of the traditional aristocracy, and especially the capable and ambitious Michael Palaiologos. The aristocrats' hostility was further intensified when the emperor gave his low-born favourites noble brides: George Mouzalon wedded Theodora Kantakouzene, a niece of Michael Palaiologos, and Andronikos married a daughter of the former protovestiarios Alexios Raoul. After Mouzalon's murder, Theodora would marry the protovestiarios John Raoul Petraliphas (in 1261). A staunch opponent of her uncle's unionist religious policies, she was exiled and became a nun. After Michael's death, she restored the monastery of Saint Andrew in Krisei, to where she transferred the relics of Patriarch Arsenios Autoreianos, and was a prominent member of the capital's literary circles.

=== Appointment as regent and assassination ===
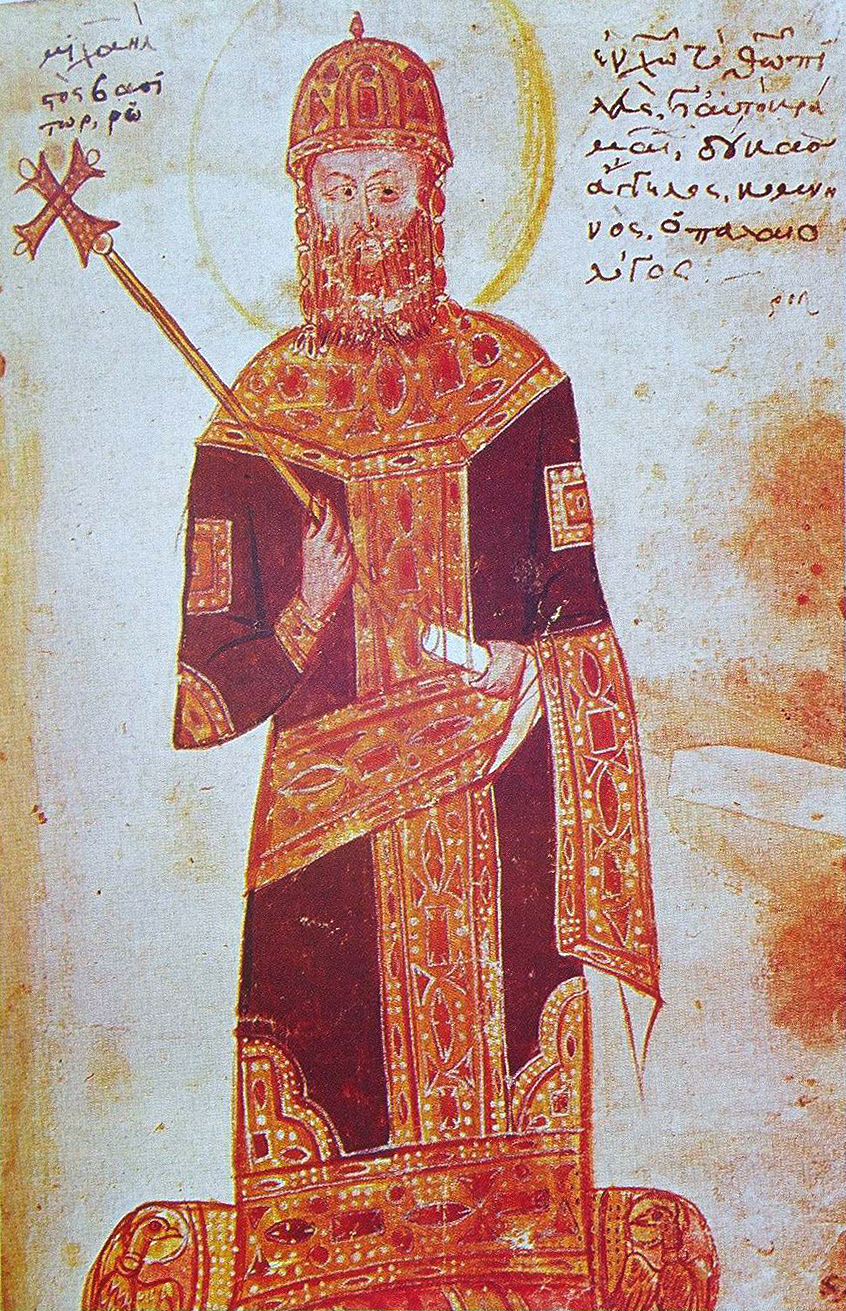
Michael Palaiologos, who as leader of the aristocrats orchestrated Mouzalon's murder, facilitating his own rise to the imperial throne

Shortly before Theodore II died on 16 August 1258, he left George Mouzalon as regent and guardian of his eight-year-old son John IV. Patriarch Arsenios Autoreianos may have shared guardianship of John: although the later historians Nikephoros Gregoras and Makarios Melissenos say the Patriarch was named in this context, the contemporary historians George Pachymeres and George Akropolites name only Mouzalon. This appointment further enraged the aristocracy, and Mouzalon's position became extremely precarious. Mouzalon was also unpopular with the clergy because he was associated with Theodore's high-handed treatment of the Church, and with the people, who feared that he would try to usurp the throne. Most importantly, however, he faced the hostility of the army, in particular the Latin mercenaries, who had apparently been denied the usual stipends and donatives. In addition, they probably resented Theodore's intention to raise a "national" army composed solely of Byzantine Greeks, and Mouzalon is recorded by Pachymeres to have taken such measures. Palaiologos, who as megas konostaulos held command over the Latins, was in a good position to exploit these grievances.

To prevent any action against his testament's provisions for his son's succession and the regency, Theodore on his deathbed demanded an oath to be taken by Senate, army, people and clergy, both those present at court and those absent elsewhere in the state. Immediately after his death, George Mouzalon, aware of his vulnerability and his complete lack of support, called an assembly of the leading nobles, officials, and military commanders. He offered to resign from his post in favour of any person that the assembly chose, but the dignitaries, led by Michael Palaiologos, dissuaded him and encouraged him to stay on and even accepted to take an oath of loyalty to him as well as to the young emperor. It was a sham, as a conspiracy by the leading aristocratic families was well under way to depose him, in which Palaiologos apparently played a covert but leading role.

Only a few days after the death of Theodore II (the sources disagree on the exact date, although 25 August is the widely accepted date), a memorial service was held at the Monastery of Sosandra in Magnesia, founded by John III Vatatzes and serving as his and Theodore's burial place. The entire court attended, while the army was encamped on the plain below the monastery. As soon as George Mouzalon, his brothers and his retinue arrived, the service began. Outside the church soldiers had assembled, many of them Latin mercenaries, and they began to clamour and demand to see the young emperor. John IV went outside and raised his hand to quiet them; the soldiers allegedly mistook this as a signal. Joined by a large mob, they stormed the church aiming to kill the Mouzalon brothers. They were warned of what was going on, but George only sent his secretary, Theophylact, to investigate. He was mistaken for Mouzalon and killed by the crowd. The mob soon realized its error (the secretary was wearing black shoes, while the protovestiarios wore the green ones appropriate to his rank) and entered the church, the soldiers with swords in hand.

As the people inside the church scattered, the Mouzalon brothers tried to hide: George hid under the altar, Andronikos behind a door, and Theodore in a corner by the emperor's tomb. The mob proceeded to search the church for them, and George was discovered by a Latin soldier named Karoulos (a Hellenized form of "Charles"). Mouzalon was dragged from under the altar and, despite pleading to ransom his life, was killed. So great was the frenzy of the crowd that his corpse was repeatedly stabbed and hacked to pieces, so that the parts had to be gathered in a sack for burial afterwards. Andronikos and an unnamed brother-in-law too were slain, while Theodore's fate is uncertain: some scholars believe he survived and is to be identified with Theodore Mouzalon, a chief minister to both Michael VIII and Andronikos II Palaiologos (r. 1282–1328). The Mouzalon family's houses were then ransacked by the mob; and when George Mouzalon's wife fled to her uncle Michael Palaiologos and pleaded for her husband's life, she was brusquely told to be quiet or she would share his fate. Palaiologos's responsibility in the whole affair is further supported by the fact that none of the Mouzalon brothers' murderers were ever prosecuted. Indeed, the mercenary Charles appears later as Palaiologos's confidant.

Mouzalon's death was followed by a purge of Theodore II's other prominent "new men", the protostrator John Angelos and the protovestiarites Karyanites: Angelos was recalled by Palaiologos, but died (or committed suicide) on the way, while Karyanites was imprisoned. Among Theodore II's protégés, only George Akropolites survived, apparently because he at the time was a prisoner of war in Epirus; eventually, he reached high office under Michael Palaiologos. Michael Palaiologos in the meantime consolidated his position, being named regent with the rank of megas doux. Soon he took the title of despotes, and in early 1259, he was crowned emperor. Ostensibly still the guardian and co-emperor of John IV, after the recapture of Constantinople in 1261 he sidelined and imprisoned John, being crowned sole emperor at the Hagia Sophia and founding the Palaiologan dynasty, the last ruling house of Byzantium.

== Treatment by historians ==
Among the contemporary sources, the history of Akropolites is the most negative towards the Mouzalon brothers, whom he calls "loathsome little men, worthless specimens of humanity" and "false of tongue, nimble of foot, peerless at beating the floor in dance". Although otherwise reliable, Akropolites's account on this issue is suspect: on the one hand, he evidently tries to disassociate himself from Theodore II's "new men", to whom he too originally belonged, while on the other he is generally strongly biased in favour of Michael Palaiologos, whom he tries to exculpate from the assassination. Other historians of the time paint a more favourable picture. The account of the near-contemporary Theodore Skoutariotes, which otherwise generally follows Akropolites closely, notably fails to repeat the latter's negative comments, and even records that it was the assembled nobles who persuaded the Mouzalones to stay in the church during the riot on the day of their murder. George Pachymeres too, whose treatment of Theodore Laskaris's reign and the Laskarid emperors in general is far more favourable than Akropolites's, considers the Mouzalones to have been promoted on merit, condemns their murder, and names Palaiologos as directly responsible. The later historian Nikephoros Gregoras likewise avoids negative comments, as do most modern historians.

== Sources ==
- Geanakoplos, Deno John (1959). Emperor Michael Palaeologus and the West, 1258–1282: A Study in Byzantine-Latin Relations. Cambridge, Massachusetts: Harvard University Press.
- Kazhdan, Alexander, ed. (1991). The Oxford Dictionary of Byzantium. Oxford and New York: Oxford University Press. ISBN 0-19-504652-8.
- Macrides, Ruth (2007). George Akropolites: The History – Introduction, Translation and Commentary. Oxford: Oxford University Press. ISBN 978-0-19-921067-1.
- Makripoulias, Christos (10 October 2005). "Mouzalon Family". Encyclopedia of the Hellenic World, Asia Minor. Foundation of the Hellenic World.
- Nicol, Donald M. (1993) [1972]. The Last Centuries of Byzantium, 1261–1453 (Second ed.). Cambridge: Cambridge University Press. ISBN 978-0-521-43991-6.

Preceded by Nikephoros Tarchaneiotes	Megas domestikos of the Empire of Nicaea; 1254–1255	Succeeded by Andronikos Mouzalon
New title	Megas stratopedarches of the Empire of Nicaea; 1255–1258	Succeeded by Balanidiotes
