= George Pachymeres =

Byzantine historian and philosopher (1242 – c. 1310)

- Γεώργιος Παχυμέρης
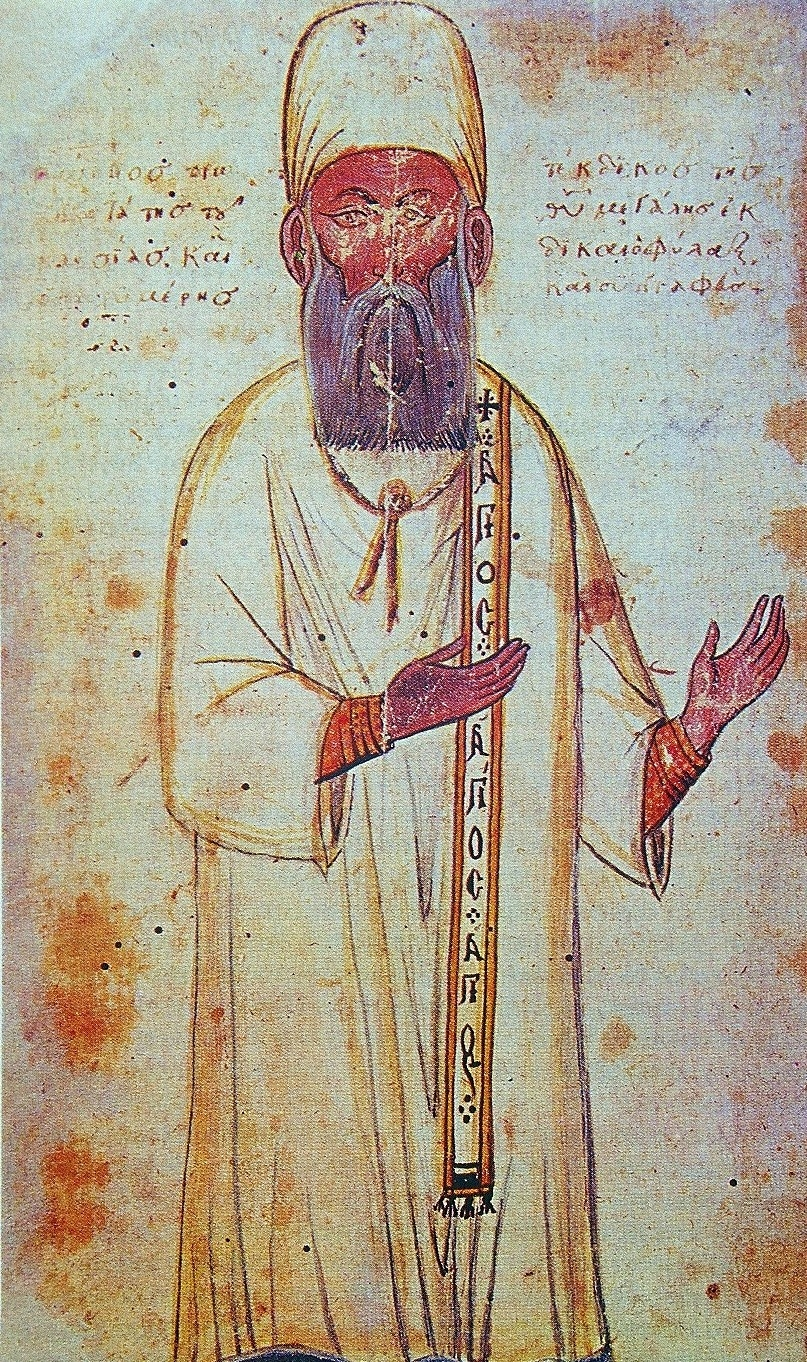
- Portrait of George Pachymeres in his History
- Born: 1242; Nicaea, Bithynia, Empire of Nicaea (modern İznik, Bursa, Turkey)
- Died: c. 1310
- Occupations: Historian; Philosopher; Music theorist; Miscellaneous writer; Chief advocate of the church; Chief justice of the imperial court

Academic background
- Education: University of Constantinople
- Academic advisor: George Akropolites

Academic work
- Institutions: University of Constantinople
- Notable students: Maximus Planudes

George Pachymeres (Greek: Γεώργιος Παχυμέρης, romanized: Geórgios Pachyméris; 1242 – c. 1310) was a Byzantine historian, philosopher, music theorist and miscellaneous writer.

== Biography ==
Pachymeres was born at Nicaea, in Bithynia, where his father had taken refuge after the capture of Constantinople by the Latins in 1204. Upon the recovery of Constantinople from the Latin Empire by Michael VIII Palaeologus, Pachymeres settled there, studied law, entered the church, and subsequently became chief advocate of the church and chief justice of the imperial court.

His literary activity was considerable, his most important work being a Byzantine history in thirteen books, in continuation of that of George Acropolites from 1261 to 1308, containing the history of the reigns of Michael and Andronicus II Palaeologus. Pachymeres was also the author of rhetorical exercises on philosophical themes; of a Quadrivium (arithmetic, music, geometry, astronomy), valuable for the history of music and astronomy in the Middle Ages; a general sketch of Aristotelian philosophy; a paraphrase of the speeches and letters of Pseudo-Dionysius the Areopagite; poems, including an autobiography; and a description of the square of the Augustaeum, and the column erected by Justinian in the church of Hagia Sophia to commemorate his victories over the Persians.

The History was first published in print by I. Bekker (1835) in the Corpus Scriptorum Historiae Byzantinae; also by J. P. Migne, in Patrologia Graeca (vol. cxliii, cxliv); for editions of the minor works see Karl Krumbacher, Geschichte der byzantinischen Litteratur (1897). A more recent edition with French translation of the History by Albert Failler (editor) and Vitalien Laurent (translator) was published in 1984. An English translation of Books I and II (up to the recovery of Constantinople in 1261), with commentary, exists in the form of a Ph.D. thesis by Nathan John Cassidy held in the Reid Library of the University of Western Australia.
