= Grand domestic =

Supreme Byzantine military office

The title of Grand domestic (Greek: μέγας δομέστικος, romanized: mégas doméstikos) was given in the 11th–15th centuries to the commander-in-chief of the Byzantine army, directly below the Byzantine Emperor. It evolved from the earlier office of the domestic of the Schools, and came to rank as one of the senior dignities in the Byzantine state during the last centuries of its existence. From Byzantium, it was also adopted by the breakaway Empire of Trebizond, as well as by the 14th-century Serbian Empire.

== History and evolution ==
The title of the grand domestic is first mentioned in the 9th century, and most likely derives from the older office of domestikos tōn scholōn ("Domestic of the Schools"), with the epithet megas added to connote the supreme authority of its holder, following contemporary practice evident in other offices as well. Both titles appear to have co-existed for a time, with the grand domestic being a more exalted variant of the plain titles of the domestics of the East and of the West, until the late 11th century, when it became a distinct office and replaced the ordinary domestics as commander-in-chief. Nevertheless, the office was still sometimes referred to in the sources as the "Grand Domestic of the Schools" or "of the army", creating some confusion as to which of the two posts is meant. For most of its existence, the office of Grand Domestic was by its nature confined to a single holder. However, the presence of "Grand Domestics of the East/West" in the late 12th century may indicate the resumption of the well-established practice of dividing supreme field command, as with the Domesticate of the Schools, between east (Asia Minor) and west (Balkans), while in the late 14th century several people appear to hold the office at the same time, perhaps in a collegial manner.

Following the Fourth Crusade, it appears that in the Latin Empire and the other Latin states formed on Byzantine soil, the title of megas domestikos was used as the Greek equivalent of the Western title of [grand] seneschal (Latin: [magnus] senescallus). In the Palaiologan period (1261–1453), the grand domestic was the unchallenged commander-in-chief of the army, except in the case of the emperor campaigning in person, when he functioned as a kind of chief of staff. Despite its purely military nature, the office was also bestowed in the way of an honorific dignity to generals and high-ranking courtiers alike, e.g. to George Mouzalon, or to the Prince of Achaea William II of Villehardouin.

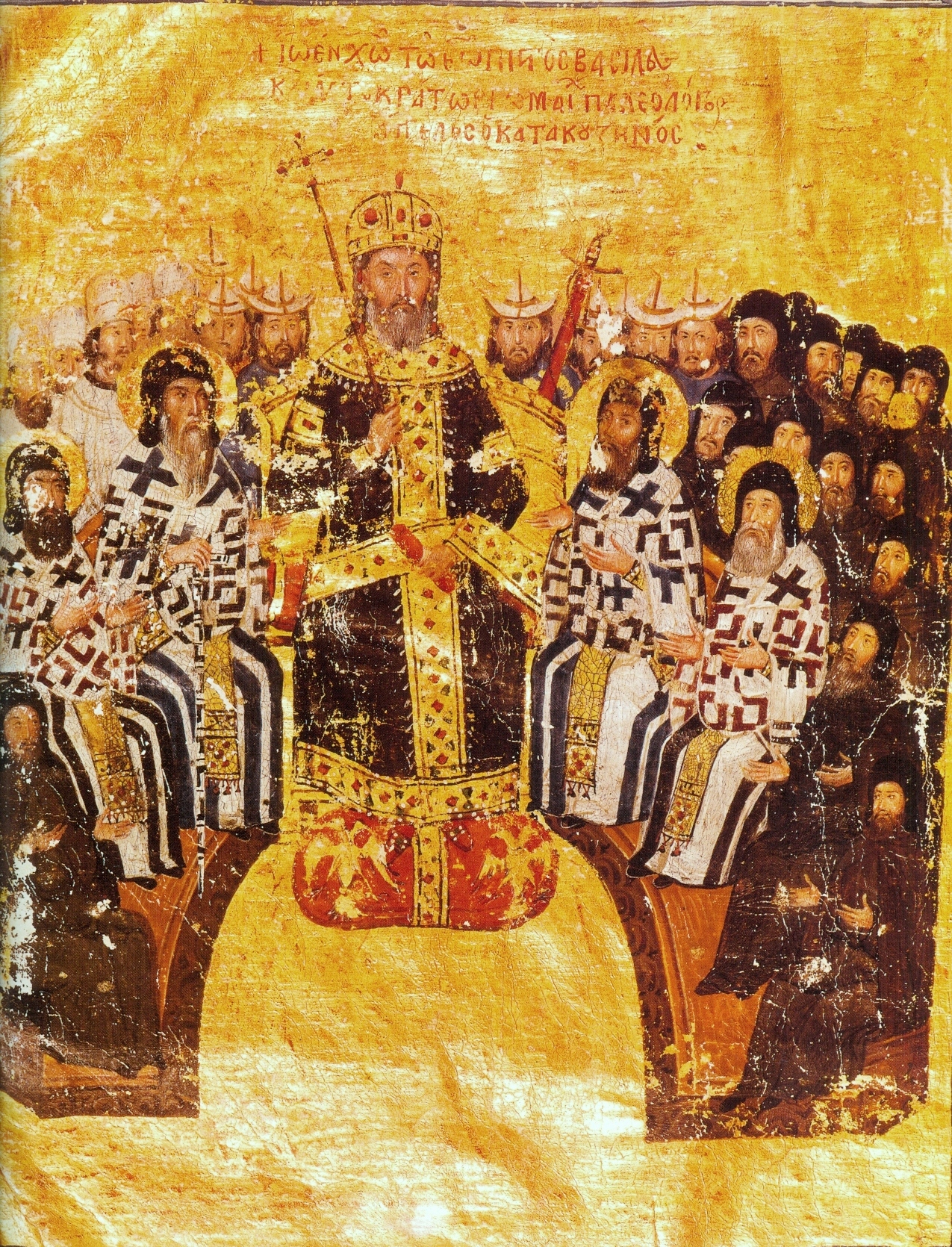
Emperor John VI Kantakouzenos held the office of Grand Domestic during the reign of his close friend, Andronikos III Palaiologos.

The office varied in importance in the court hierarchy. Under the Komnenian emperors, it came immediately after the "imperial" titles of Caesar, sebastokratōr and despotēs. In the 13th century, it rose and fell according to the emperors' desire to honour its holder, but was usually at seventh place, below the prōtovestiarios and the megas stratopedarchēs. It was not until the award of the title to John Kantakouzenos in the 1320s that the office firmly established itself once again as the highest non-imperial title, at the fourth place of the palace hierarchy. At all times, however, it was regarded as one of the most important and prestigious positions, and was held either by members of the reigning dynasty or by close relatives from the small circle of families connected to the imperial clan. Like all Byzantine offices, it was neither hereditary nor transferable, and its bestowal was the province of the reigning emperor. The office also included various ceremonial functions, as detailed in the mid-14th century account of offices of pseudo-Kodinos.

The grand domestic's distinctive insignia are given by pseudo-Kodinos as follows:

- A skiadion hat in red and gold, decorated with embroideries in the klapoton style, with a veil and pendants in the same style. Alternatively, a domed skaranikon hat could be worn, again in red and gold, with a portrait of the emperor, standing crowned and flanked by angels, within a circle of pearls, in front. The skaranikon itself was also bordered with pearls.
- A rich silk tunic, the kabbadion, of two colours, decorated with stripes of gold braid.
- A staff of office (dikanikion) with carved knobs, with the first of plain gold, the second of gold bordered with silver braid, the third like the first, the fourth like the second, etc.

== List of known holders ==
=== Byzantine Empire ===
Persons who most likely bore in reality only the title of Domestic of the Schools and were termed grand domestics only as a honorific, are marked with light grey

Name	Tenure	Appointed by	Notes	Refs
Galenos	9th century	Unknown	Known only through his seal, which mentions his titles as "imperial primikērios, prōtovestiarios and megas domestikos"	
John Komnenos	1057–1059	Isaac I Komnenos	Younger brother of Isaac I, he was raised to kouropalatēs and "Grand Domestic" by his brother. The usage of "Grand Domestic" is apparently an anachronistic usage by later sources, and his real title was probably Domestic of Schools of the West. However, a seal of a "John, nōbelissimos, prōtovestiarios and Grand Domestic of the Schools of the East" might be attributable to him.	
Andronikos Doukas	c. 1072	Michael VII Doukas	Son of the Caesar John Doukas and cousin of Michael VII, he was appointed Domestic of the Schools ("Grand Domestic" in a document of 1073) to confront the attempt by Romanos IV Diogenes to reclaim his throne.	
Alexios Komnenos	1078–1081	Nikephoros III Botaneiates	Nephew of Isaac I, he was appointed to the Domesticate of the West to combat the revolts of Nikephoros Bryennios and Nikephoros Basilakes. In 1081, he deposed Nikephoros III and became emperor, ruling until his death in 1118.	
Gregory Pakourianos	1081–1086	Alexios I Komnenos	Was named "Grand Domestic of the West" after Alexios Komnenos ascended the throne, and was killed in battle in 1086. R. Guilland qualifies him as the first person to be officially named "Grand Domestic" as a distinct title.	
Adrianos Komnenos	1086 – after 1095	Alexios I Komnenos	A younger brother of Alexios I, he succeeded Pakourianos as "Grand Domestic of the West" in 1086.	
John Axouch	1118–1150/1	John II Komnenos	A Turk taken captive as a boy in the Siege of Nicaea and given as a childhood companion to John II. A loyal friend and a capable soldier and administrator, he became Grand Domestic on John II's accession and held the post into the reign of Manuel I Komnenos, until his death.	
John Komnenos Vatatzes	1177/80 – 1183	Manuel I Komnenos	A nephew of Manuel I, he served against the Seljuk Turks and under Alexios II Komnenos was governor of the Thracesian Theme. He tried to oppose the accession of Andronikos I Komnenos to the throne, and rebelled against him, but fell ill and died.	
Basil Vatatzes	c. 1189 – 1193	Isaac II Angelos	Married to a niece of Isaac II, he served as Domestic of the East and later as "Grand" Domestic of the West. According to R. Guilland, he was probably not a Grand Domestic in the strict sense of the title.	
Alexios Gidos	c. 1185 – 1194	Isaac II Angelos	He served as "Grand" Domestic of the East and later as Domestic of the West alongside Basil Vatatzes. The ambiguity about his title and whether he was a true "Grand Domestic" is the same as with Vatatzes.	
Andronikos Palaiologos	by 1228 – 1248/52	Theodore I Laskaris or John III Doukas Vatatzes	He was named Grand Domestic of the Empire of Nicaea either by Theodore I or by his successor, John III. Replaced as actual commander-in-chief, but not as Grand Domestic, by Theodore Philes, he served as governor of Thessalonica from its conquest in 1246 until his death sometime between 1248 and 1252. He was the father of the emperor Michael VIII Palaiologos.	
Nikephoros Tarchaneiotes	by 1252 – 1254	John III Doukas Vatatzes	Son-in-law of Andronikos Palaiologos, at the death of the latter he was epi tes trapezes and was soon promoted to Grand Domestic to succeed him. He died in 1254.	
George Mouzalon	1254–1256	Theodore II Laskaris	Theodore II's closest friend and protégé, he was named Grand Domestic in 1254. However, it was the emperor himself who led the army on campaign, Mouzalon remaining behind as regent. He was further promoted to protosebastos, protovestiarios and megas stratopedarches in 1256.	
Andronikos Mouzalon	1256–1258	Theodore II Laskaris	Brother of George Mouzalon, he succeeded him when he was promoted further up the hierarchy in 1256. He was killed along with his other brothers in the nobles coup in 1258, after the death of Theodore II.	
John Palaiologos	1258–1259	John IV Laskaris (nominal)	Brother of Michael VIII, he was raised to the Grand Domesticate when the latter became regent of the under-age John IV Laskaris, but was rapidly promoted further to sebastokrator and later Despot. He continued to be active as a general almost to the end of his life, and scored several victories for his brother.	
Alexios Strategopoulos	1259	Michael VIII Palaiologos	An old general, he was disgraced after a defeat in 1255 and punished by the emperor. He became a partisan of Michael Palaiologos, who named him Grand Domestic shortly before he was crowned emperor in 1259. For his successes against the Despotate of Epirus, he was named Caesar shortly after. His career was chequered by failures and periods of imprisonment, but on 25 July 1261 he led the recapture of Constantinople from the Latin Empire and the restoration of the Byzantine Empire under the Palaiologoi.	
Alexios Philes	1259–1263/4	Michael VIII Palaiologos	Philes had married a niece of Michael VIII. He was sent in the Peloponnese but was defeated and captured by the Principality of Achaea, dying in captivity.	
William II of Villehardouin	1262	Michael VIII Palaiologos	William was the Prince of Achaea in the Peloponnese, and had been taken captive in the 1259 Battle of Pelagonia. In 1262, he was released after he handed over some fortresses to the Empire, and received the title (possibly honorific) of Grand Domestic. Upon his return to the Peloponnese, however, he repudiated his oath and war began with Byzantium.	
Michael Tarchaneiotes	1272–1284	Michael VIII Palaiologos	A son of Michael VIII's eldest sister, Martha-Maria. He campaigned against the Turks in Asia Minor in 1278, and scored a major victory against the Angevins at the Siege of Berat in 1281. He was killed at the siege of Demetrias in 1284.	
Theodore Komnenos Angelos	c. 1286	Andronikos II Palaiologos	A gambros (related by marriage to the imperial family) of Andronikos II, he is mentioned in a document of the Theotokos of the Lembos monastery in 1286.	
Syrgiannes	before 1290	Andronikos II Palaiologos	A Cuman, he had entered Byzantine service under John III Vatatzes and had become baptized, marrying a niece of Michael VIII. He was the father of Syrgiannes Palaiologos.	
John Angelos Sennachereim	c. 1296	Andronikos II Palaiologos	Mentioned in the context of preparations for repelling a Venetian attack in July 1296.	
Alexios Raoul	unknown – 1303	Andronikos II Palaiologos	Active as a fleet commander against Demetrias in 1284, he rose to Grand Domestic by 1303, when he was sent to negotiate with the mutinous Alan mercenaries, but was killed by them.	
John Kantakouzenos	c. 1325 – 1341/47	Andronikos III Palaiologos	The closest friend and collaborator of Andronikos III, he was probably raised to the position during the civil war against Andronikos II. To show his special favour to his friend, Andronikos III raised the Grand Domestic to an even higher position among the court dignities, immediately after the Caesar. Kantakouzenos remained Grand Domestic until 1341, when he was proclaimed Emperor, although technically he held the post until he was crowned in 1347, following his victory in the civil war against the regents of the under-age John V Palaiologos.	
Stephen Chreles	1341–1342	John VI Kantakouzenos	A Serbian magnate and military leader, he entertained close relations with Byzantium and supported John Kantakouzenos in the first years of the civil war, receiving the titles of Grand Domestic and later Caesar.	
Tarchaneiotes	unknown – 1354 or 1355	John VI Kantakouzenos	Otherwise unknown, he was murdered on 2 November 1355 (or 1354) n Constantinople.	
Alexios Metochites	c. 1355–1369	John VI Kantakouzenos and John V Palaiologos	He was probably the son of the megas logothetes Theodore Metochites. He is mentioned as Grand Domestic in 1356 and again in the 1360s, seemingly holding the title along several other people during this period, which has led to suggestions that his office was honorary, like William of Villehardouin's, or that the division between Domestics of the East and the West was revived for a time.	
Alexios Atouemes	c. 1357	John V Palaiologos	An uncle of the Emperor, he is attested as a witness in the renewal of the peace treaty with Venice.	
Demetrios Palaiologos	c. 1357–1375	John V Palaiologos	A relative of the Emperor John V, his exact position within the Palaiologos family is uncertain. He is attested as a witness in the renewal of the peace treaty with Venice, and continues to be attested as a Grand Domestic in acts as late as 1375.	
Andronikos Palaiologos Kantakouzenos	c. 1437–1453	John VIII Palaiologos; Constantine XI Palaiologos	First mentioned on being sent on a diplomatic mission to Serbia in 1437, Andronikos Palaiologos Kantakouzenos was the brother of the Despotess of Serbia, Irene Kantakouzene, and held the post until the Fall of Constantinople in 1453. He survived the sack of the city, but was executed by the Ottoman Sultan Mehmed II a few days later along with Loukas Notaras and other notables.	

=== Empire of Trebizond ===
Name	Tenure	Appointed by	Notes	Refs
Tzampas	unknown – 1332	unknown	Nothing is known of him except that he was executed in September 1332 by Basil of Trebizond along with his father, the megas doux Lekes Tzatzintzaios.	
Leo Kabazites	1344 – January 1351	Michael of Trebizond	Protovestiarios and Grand Domestic of the Empire of Trebizond. Imprisoned after a failed rebellion against the emperor Alexios III.	
Gregory Meitzomates	1345–1355	Michael of Trebizond		

=== Serbian Empire ===
Name	Tenure	Appointed by	Notes	Refs
Jovan Oliver	before 1349	Stefan Dušan	A powerful Serbian magnate, he held a series of Byzantine-derived titles at the court of Stefan Dušan's Serbian Empire, eventually rising to the rank of despot.	
Alexios Doukas Raoul	c. 1355–1366	Stefan Dušan; Stefan Uroš V	A local magnate from Zichnai, he was Grand Domestic of the Serbian Empire.	

== Sources ==
- Bartusis, Mark C. (1997). The Late Byzantine Army: Arms and Society 1204–1453. Philadelphia, Pennsylvania: University of Pennsylvania Press. ISBN 0-8122-1620-2.
- Guilland, Rodolphe (1967). "Le grand domestique". Recherches sur les institutions byzantines [Studies on the Byzantine Institutions]. Berliner byzantinische Arbeiten 35 (in French). Vol. I. Berlin and Amsterdam: Akademie-Verlag & Adolf M. Hakkert. pp. 405–425. OCLC 878894516.
- Guilland, Rodolphe (1967). "Le Domestique des Scholes". Recherches sur les institutions byzantines [Studies on the Byzantine Institutions]. Berliner byzantinische Arbeiten 35 (in French). Vol. I. Berlin and Amsterdam: Akademie-Verlag & Adolf M. Hakkert. pp. 426–468. OCLC 878894516.
- Haldon, John (1999). Warfare, State and Society in the Byzantine World, 565–1204. London: UCL Press. ISBN 1-85728-495-X.
- Kazhdan, Alexander, ed. (1991). The Oxford Dictionary of Byzantium. Oxford and New York: Oxford University Press. ISBN 0-19-504652-8.
- Kyriakidis, Savvas (2008). "The role of the megas domestikos in the late Byzantine army (1204-1453)". Byzantinoslavica. LXVI: 241–258. ISSN 0007-7712.
- Macrides, Ruth (2007). George Akropolites: The History – Introduction, Translation and Commentary. Oxford: Oxford University Press. ISBN 978-0-19-921067-1.
- Nicol, Donald M. (1993). The Last Centuries of Byzantium, 1261–1453 (Second ed.). Cambridge: Cambridge University Press. ISBN 978-0-521-43991-6.
- Trapp, Erich; Beyer, Hans-Veit; Walther, Rainer; Sturm-Schnabl, Katja; Kislinger, Ewald; Leontiadis, Ioannis; Kaplaneres, Sokrates (1976–1996). Prosopographisches Lexikon der Palaiologenzeit (in German). Vienna: Verlag der Österreichischen Akademie der Wissenschaften. ISBN 3-7001-3003-1.
- Van Tricht, Filip (2011). The Latin Renovatio of Byzantium: The Empire of Constantinople (1204–1228). Leiden: Brill. ISBN 978-90-04-20323-5.
- Verpeaux, Jean, ed. (1966). Pseudo-Kodinos, Traité des Offices (in French). Paris: Centre National de la Recherche Scientifique.
