= Michael VIII Palaiologos =

Byzantine emperor from 1261 to 1282

- Emperor and Autocrat of the Romans
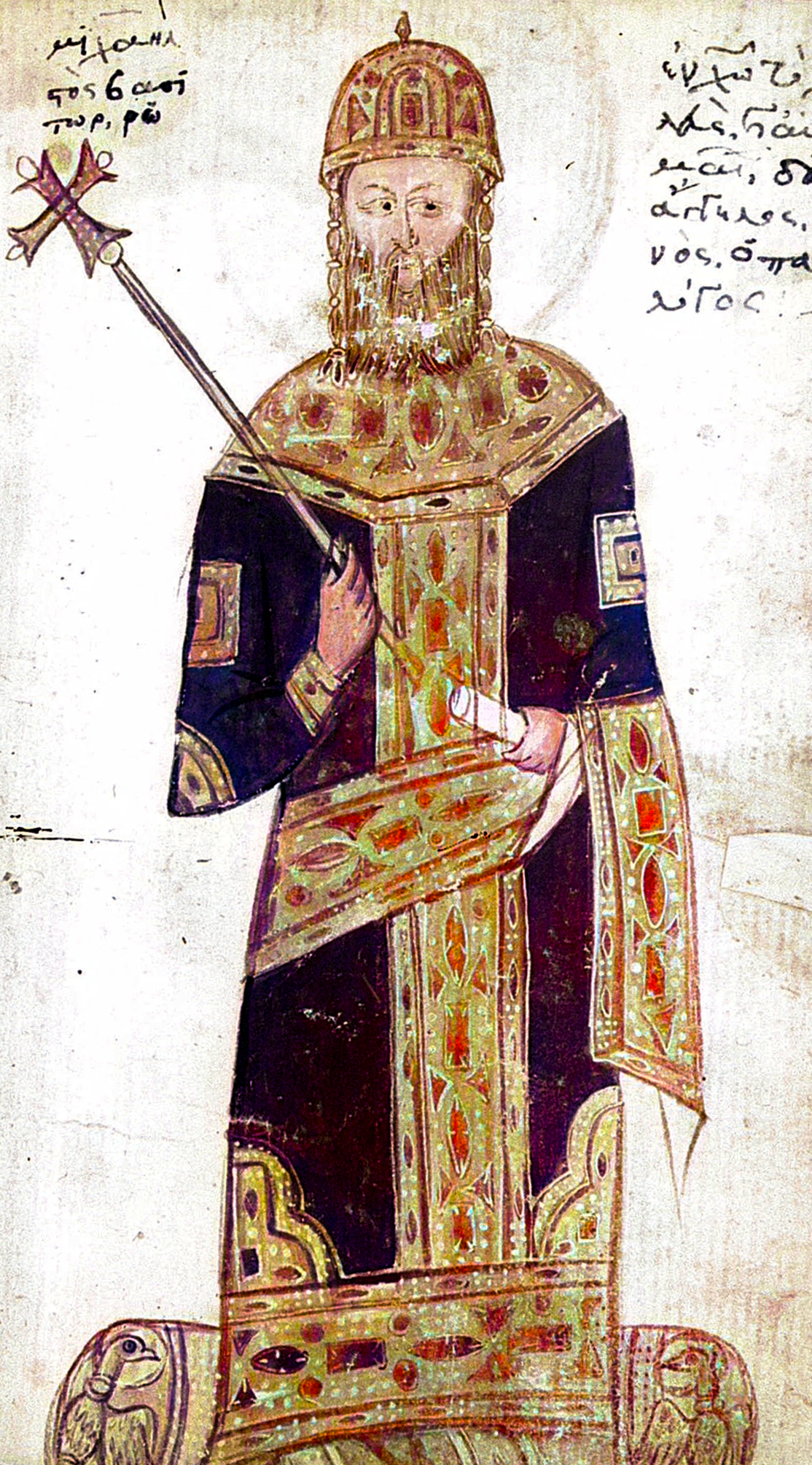
- Miniature portrait in a manuscript of George Pachymeres' Historia, early 14th century (Note: The Codex Monacensis gr. 442, which contains the history of George Pachymeres (1242 – c. 1310), was likely made during the reign of John VI Kantakouzenos (r. 1347–1354), as an explanatory note refers to him as emperor, although this could be a later addition.)

Byzantine emperor
- Reign: 15 August 1261 – 11 December 1282 (Note: Co-emperor with Andronikos II Palaiologos (1272–1282).)
- Predecessor: Baldwin II as Latin Emperor
- Successor: Andronikos II Palaiologos
- Co-emperors: Andronikos II Palaiologos (c. 1265 – 1282); Michael IX Palaiologos (c. 1281 – 1282)

Emperor of Nicaea
- Reign: 1 January 1259 – 15 August 1261 (Note: Co-emperor with John IV Laskaris.)
- Predecessor: John IV Doukas Laskaris
- Successor: Byzantine Empire restored
Pre-imperial positions
Despotes
In office 13 November 1258 – 1 January 1259
Monarch	John IV Laskaris
Megas Doux
In office September 1258 – 13 November 1258
Monarch	John IV Laskaris
Megas konostaulos (II)
In office Early 1257 – September 1258
Monarch	Theodore II Doukas Laskaris
Megas konostaulos (I)
In office Winter 1253/1254 – Summer 1256
Monarch	John III Vatatzes
- Born: 1224; Empire of Nicaea
- Died: 11 December 1282 (aged 58); Pachomion, near Lysimachia, Byzantine Empire (Note: Now near the Gulf of Saros, Turkey.)
- Spouse: Theodora Palaiologina
- Issue more...: Irene Palaiologina; Andronikos II Palaiologos; Constantine Palaiologos; Eudokia Palaiologina; Theodore Palaiologos; Euphrosyne Palaiologina; Maria Palaiologina
Names
- Michael Doukas Angelos Komnenos Palaiologos; Byzantine Greek: Μιχαὴλ Δούκας Ἄνγελος Κομνηνὸς Παλαιολόγος
- Dynasty: Palaiologos
- Father: Andronikos Komnenos Palaiologos
- Mother: Theodora Angelina Palaiologina
- Religion: Eastern Orthodox Christian

Michael VIII Palaiologos or Palaeologus (Greek: Μιχαὴλ Δούκας Ἄνγελος Κομνηνὸς Παλαιολόγος, romanized: Mikhaḗl Doúkās Ángelos Komnēnós Palaiológos; 1224 – 11 December 1282) reigned as Byzantine emperor from 1261 until his death in 1282, and previously as the co-emperor of the Empire of Nicaea from 1259 to 1261. Michael VIII was the founder of the Palaiologan dynasty that would rule the Byzantine Empire until the Fall of Constantinople in 1453. He recovered Constantinople from the Latin Empire in 1261 and transformed the Empire of Nicaea into a restored Byzantine Empire. His reign saw considerable recovery of Byzantine power, including the enlargement of the Byzantine army and navy. It also included the reconstruction of the city of Constantinople, and the increase of its population. His re-establishment of the University of Constantinople contributed to the Palaeologan Renaissance, a cultural flowering between the 13th and 15th centuries.

It was also at this time that the focus of the Byzantine military shifted to the Balkans, against the Bulgarians, leaving the Anatolian frontier neglected. His successors could not compensate for this change of focus, and both the Arsenite schism and two civil wars which occurred from 1321–1328 and 1341–1347 undermined further efforts toward territorial consolidation and recovery, draining the empire's strength, economy, and resources. Regular conflict between Byzantine successor states such as Trebizond, Epirus, Bulgaria and Serbia resulted in permanent fragmentation of former Byzantine territory and opportunity for increasingly successful conquests of expansive territories by post-Seljuk Anatolian beyliks, most notably that of Osman, later called the Ottoman Empire.

== Early life ==
Michael VIII Palaiologos was the son of the megas domestikos Andronikos Doukas Komnenos Palaiologos by Theodora Angelina Palaiologina, the granddaughter of Emperor Alexios III Angelos and Euphrosyne Doukaina Kamaterina. According to Deno John Geanakoplos, Michael's ancestry could be traced back to all three imperial houses that ruled the empire in the centuries before the Sack of Constantinople in 1204 by the Fourth Crusade. His mother does not appear to have played a significant role in his early life; at least for a time, he was brought up by his elder sister Martha, the wife of megas domestikos Nikephoros Tarchaneiotes, although she was only ten years older than he.

== Rise to power ==
Michael rose to distinction at an early age, serving as the governor of the Thracian towns of Melnik and Serres under the command of his father Andronikos. However, in the autumn of 1253, Michael was accused before the Emperor John III Vatatzes of plotting against the throne. The only way Michael was allowed to prove his innocence was through trial by ordeal, holding a red-hot iron. When the Emperor ordered him to take hold of the red-hot metal, the young Michael answered (to use Geanakoplos' words) "with the astuteness that was to characterize his later career as Emperor": if the Metropolitan Phokas of Philadelphia, who evidently supported this proposal, could take the iron from the altar with his own hands and place it in Michael's, he would gladly receive it in faith that the truth would be revealed.

Although Michael avoided punishment, and afterwards was married to the Emperor's grandniece and appointed megas konostaulos of the Latin mercenaries in the employment of the emperors of Nicaea, he was still mistrusted. Following the death of John Vatatzes, Michael crossed the Sangarios River with a few close friends and took service with the Seljuk Sultanate of Rum. From late 1256 to 1258, he served as commander of the Christian mercenaries fighting for Sultan Kaykaus II; in that later year the Emperor Theodore II Doukas Laskaris recalled Michael, and after both exchanged oaths of loyalty and guarantees of safety, Michael returned to the service of the Emperor.

A few days after the death of Emperor Theodore Laskaris in 1258, Michael Palaiologos instigated a coup against the influential bureaucrat George Mouzalon, seizing from him the guardianship of the eight-year-old Emperor John IV Doukas Laskaris. Michael was invested with the titles of megas doux and, on 13 November 1258, of despotes. On 1 January 1259, Michael was formally proclaimed emperor (basileus), most likely without John IV, in Nymphaion.

== Constantinople ==
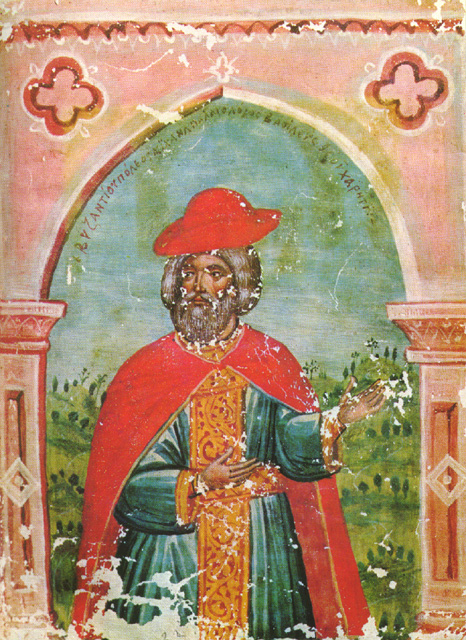
15th-century miniature of Michael VIII, National Library of Russia. (Note: The illustration of Michael VIII in the Codex gr. 118 is likely based on another portrait found in the MS Sinaiticus gr. 2123. Both portraits are heavely influenced by Renaissance art.)

In 1259, Michael VIII defeated the alliance of William of Villehardouin, Prince of Achaea, and Michael II Komnenos Doukas of Epirus at the Battle of Pelagonia. According to Geanakoplos, "In the period immediately preceding the Nicene reconquest of Constantinople in 1261 no event was of greater importance than Michael Palaeologus' victory at Pelagonia." This not only neutralized, for the immediate time, the possibility of an attack from enemies on his Western borders, but also improved Michael's legitimacy by showing him as a competent leader.

Despite this brilliant victory, only one event could remove the stigma of usurper completely from the eyes of his subjects – recovery of Constantinople itself. In 1260 Michael personally led an unsuccessful attempt to capture the city, who failed as he was tricked by Anselin of Toucy, whom he had captured at the Battle of Pelagonia. Anselin was a distant kin as he was a first cousin of Irene Branaina, Michael sister-in-law. Rumors of reinforcements for the beleaguered city forced Michael to sign a one-year truce with the Latin Emperor Baldwin II that August. Realizing that he needed a navy to effectively besiege Constantinople, Michael concluded the Treaty of Nymphaeum with Genoa in March of the following year. Genoese help proved to be unneeded when Michael VIII's general Alexios Strategopoulos captured Constantinople from Baldwin II through treachery on 25 July 1261.

News of the captured city first reached Michael's sister Eulogia Palaiologina, who awoke her brother at dawn. He was not convinced until a messenger arrived from Strategopoulos bearing the crown and sword Baldwin had abandoned in his flight from his palace. Michael VIII entered the city on 15 August and had himself crowned emperor. Once in control of Constantinople, Michael abolished all Latin customs and reinstated most Byzantine ceremonies and institutions as they had existed before the Fourth Crusade. He repopulated the capital, building its population from 35,000 when he took power to 70,000 by the end of his reign, and restored damaged churches, monasteries, and public buildings. He was acutely aware of the danger posed by the possibility that the Latin West, particularly his neighbors in Italy, would unite against him and attempt the restoration of Latin rule in Constantinople.

John IV had remained at Nicaea, largely eclipsed by Michael. According to Akropolites, the public had never really viewed John as emperor – his name was virtually stricken from government business after the death of his father Theodore II, and he had not featured in Michael's coronation ceremony as co-ruler. In December 1261, Michael VIII took the final step of having John blinded and relegated to a monastery, rendering him permanently ineligible for the throne. Michael quickly married off John's sisters to two Italians and a Bulgarian noble, so their descendants could not threaten his own children's claim to the imperial succession. Michael tried to keep the blinding of John a secret, keeping up a pretense that the boy’s formal coronation had merely been postponed. Eventually the news leaked out, and Patriarch Arsenios Autoreianos excommunicated Michael VIII. This ban was not lifted until six years later (1268) on the appointment of patriarch Joseph I.

== Diplomacy and conquest ==
In the words of Geanaklopos, "With the fall of Constantinople, the papacy suffered not only a loss of political prestige but severe damage to its spiritual authority as well. For the Greeks had now effectively reasserted their right to a church divorced from Rome. Thus it became the task of each of the six successive popes of Michael's reign to accomplish the return of the schismatics to the Roman fold." Michael was aware of the immense influence the Curia had in the West, so he immediately dispatched an embassy to Pope Urban IV consisting of two envoys; upon reaching Italy, the men were seized and one was flayed alive, while the other succeeded in escaping back to friendlier territories.

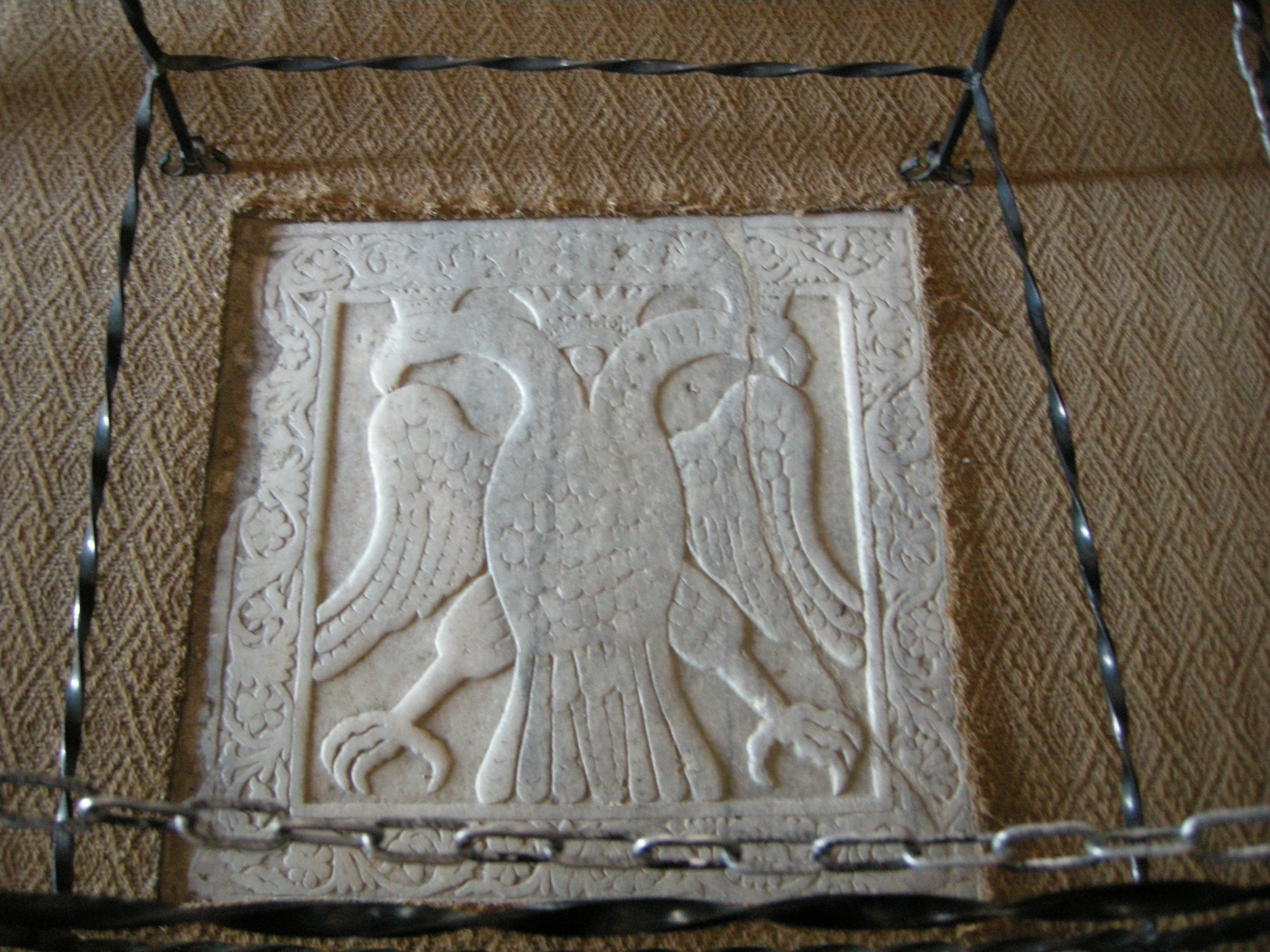
Imperial eagle in Mystras. In 1263 the Latins ceded Mystras as ransom for William II of Villehardouin, and Michael VIII Palaeologus made the city the seat of the new Despotate of Morea, ruled by his relatives.

Michael also approached Manfred of Sicily to achieve some kind of accord. In the summer of 1262, Michael offered to divorce his wife Theodora and marry Manfred's sister Anna. This offer failed spectacularly: not only did Anna reject his proposal, Theodora turned to Patriarch Arsenios for help. The Patriarch confronted the emperor and pressured him to abandon his plans. Michael yielded and sent Anna back to her brother with gifts. This gesture helped to secure the release of his general Alexios Strategopoulos.

It was around this time that Michael was presented with a dangerous distraction: ʿIzz ad-Dīn Kaykāwūs, who had been deposed as Sultan of the Seljuk Turks by a coalition led by the Pervane Mu‘in al-Din Suleyman, arrived seeking help from his old friend. But as Claude Cahen notes, he "was to be cruelly disappointed." Michael favored the Mongols of Iran, who supported ʿIzz ad-Dīn's enemy the Pervane, against those of Russia. Further, he could not risk a war on his Asian frontier while Western Europe, infinitely more dangerous, was opposed to him. Cahen believes that either ʿIzz ad-Dīn became an embarrassment, or perhaps the former Sultan "indulged in too open of criticism"; in either case, ʿIzz ad-Dīn was imprisoned. Mongol troops from Russia eventually freed him, and carried him off to the Crimea where he lived out his life.

A series of military setbacks followed. In 1263 Michael sent 15,000 men, including 5,000 Seljuk mercenaries, to Morea with the goal of conquering the Principality of Achaea, but this expedition failed in a surprise rout at Prinitza. Later that year a mixed fleet of 48 imperial and Genoese ships was defeated by a smaller Venetian force at the Battle of Settepozzi. The following year, the imperial forces in Morea were again defeated at Makryplagi after the Seljuk mercenaries, who had not been paid, changed sides. The nadir of Michael's disasters came in the spring of 1265, when an army of Tatars and Bulgars under Nogai Khan ravaging Thrace ambushed Michael Palaeologos when he was returning to Constantinople accompanied by only a few troops. Deserted by even his own officers, who fled to save their own lives, Michael was able to escape by crossing the Ganos Mountains and reaching the Marmora coast, where he happened upon two Latin ships. He quickly boarded the vessels, and two days later safely arrived at Constantinople. "Thus did Michael survive one of the narrowest escapes of his career," notes Geanakoplos.

The military advantages Michael enjoyed after capturing Constantinople had evaporated, but he would demonstrate his diplomatic skills to successfully recover from these drawbacks. After Settepozzi, Michael VIII dismissed the 60 Genoese galleys that he had hired earlier and began a rapprochement with Venice. Michael secretly negotiated a treaty with the Venetians to grant terms similar to those in the case of Nymphaeum, but Doge Raniero Zeno failed to ratify the agreement. He also signed a treaty in 1263 with the Egyptian Mamluk sultan Baibars and Berke, the Mongol Khan of Kipchak Khanate.

== Michael and Charles of Anjou ==
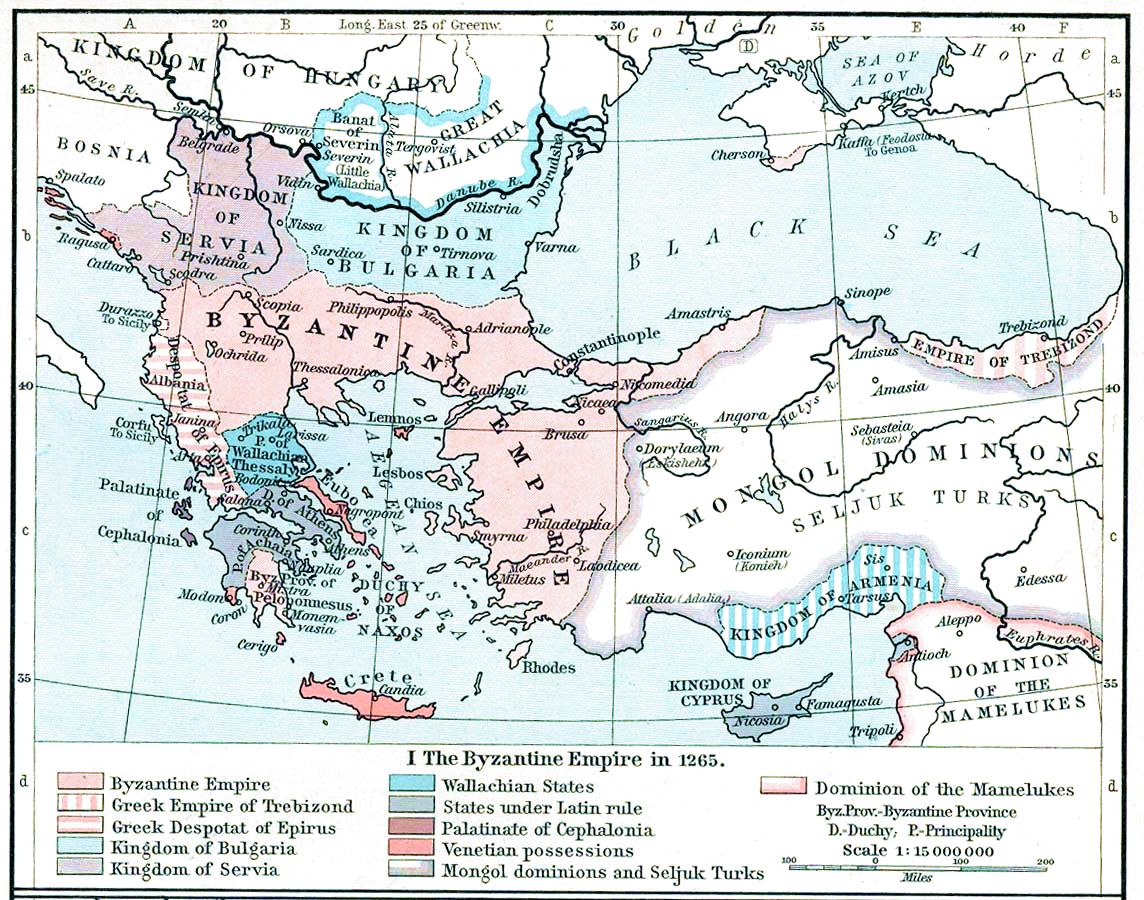
The restored Byzantine Empire in 1265 (William R. Shepherd, Historical Atlas, 1911)

The Battle of Benevento on 26 February 1266 brought forth a new challenger to Michael, one with whom he would struggle for the rest of his life: Charles of Anjou. Michael, as Geanaklopos emphasizes, "from 1266 until shortly before his death in 1282 ... was constrained to devote almost complete attention to the defeat of Charles, the fulfillment of whose ambition would have brought about the destruction of the Byzantine Empire and reimposition of Latin rule in Constantinople." Charles strengthened his hold on the kingdom of Sicily by defeating Conradin at the Battle of Tagliacozzo on 23 August 1268. And looking for help to restore the Latin Empire, on May 1267, Charles concluded the Treaty of Viterbo with the exiled Emperor Baldwin II and William II Villehardouin under the guidance of Pope Clement IV.

In many ways Michael and Charles were alike. Geanakoplos quotes Nicephorus Gregoras's comparison of the two men at length:

Charles, motivated not by small but great ambitions, implanted in his mind like a seed the resolution of taking Constantinople. He dreamed that if he could become the master of it, he would restore the entire monarchy, so to speak, of Julius Caesar and Augustus. He was very able not only in planning what he wished to do but in easily translating his thoughts into action. Clearly he surpassed all his predecessors in the strength of his nature and intelligence... Nevertheless, neither his actions against the Greeks nor those of Michael Palaeologus against the Latins could be brought to a successful conclusion. For the strength of both was for a long time so evenly matched that it was well said (this was the opinion of discerning people) that if at that time such an Emperor had not been directing Greek affairs, the Empire would easily have succumbed to Charles, the King of Italy [sic]; and, conversely, if such a King had not then been at the helm of Italian affairs, the hegemony of Italy would with little difficulty have passed to Michael Palaeologus. (Note: in the original text the Greeks are referred to as Romans "κατὰ τῶν Ῥωμαίων".Although the term "Hellen" appears as well.)

Michael was also faced with a challenge on his Asian frontier. Although the peace treaty with the Seljuk Turks continued to be honored by both parties, nomadic Turkmen had begun to infiltrate the Byzantine territories, and because of Michael's preoccupation with his Western foes, there was no organized response to this threat. Speros Vryonis also points out that due to his treatment of John IV Laskaris, "there resulted an outright alienation from Constantinople of large segments of Greek society in Bithynia and elsewhere." In 1269 Michael sent his brother the despotes John Palaiologos into the southern part of Byzantine Anatolia to clear the Maeander and Cayster valleys of Turkmen; their response was to fall back before the Byzantine army, and when John was eventually recalled to face foes in Europe, the Turkmen pushed back and resumed their conquests and settlement. Thus by 1269, the cities of Trachia Studia and Strobilos on the Carian coast were firmly Turkish possessions.

Michael's response to the Treaty of Viterbo was to attempt to weaken papal support for it; if the Pope was convinced Charles of Anjou's invasion was a just and holy war, then the forces Michael could call on could not prevent its success. Michael returned to negotiating a union of the churches with Pope Clement IV, which he had agreed to, but the latter's death in November 1268 put an end to this approach. According to Geanakoplos, only a lack of resources prevented Charles from immediately launching an attack against Michael. Looking for some restraint on Charles, Michael made a shrewd appeal to King Louis IX of France, the leading ruler of the West and the elder brother of Charles. Louis was more interested in a crusade against Muslims controlling the Holy Land than attacking a schismatic Christian. So he had Charles join his Tunisian crusade in 1270. When Louis died in Tunisia, Charles took command, negotiated a truce, and sailed to Sicily, planning to attack Byzantium. At this point a miracle saved Michael: a violent storm destroyed Charles' fleet. "To the Greeks of Byzantium," writes Geanakoplos, "it must have seemed as if the Virgin, their protector, had saved them from disaster."

After a three year interregnum, during which Charles of Anjou attempted to sway the election, a new pope was elected, Gregory X. When Michael restarted talks of union, Gregory proved to be less accommodating and negotiated from a position of strength. Michael attempted to reason with Patriarch Joseph and the synod of the importance of agreeing to this union, and that the principle of oikonomia (which Geanakoplos suggests is best translated here as "considerations of self-interest") required them to accede to papal demands. But despite a propaganda campaign over the winter of 1274–1275, Michael was forced to depose Patriarch Joseph and replace him with his own supporter John Bekkos in order to obtain a grudging consent to the union.

== Council of Lyon and after ==
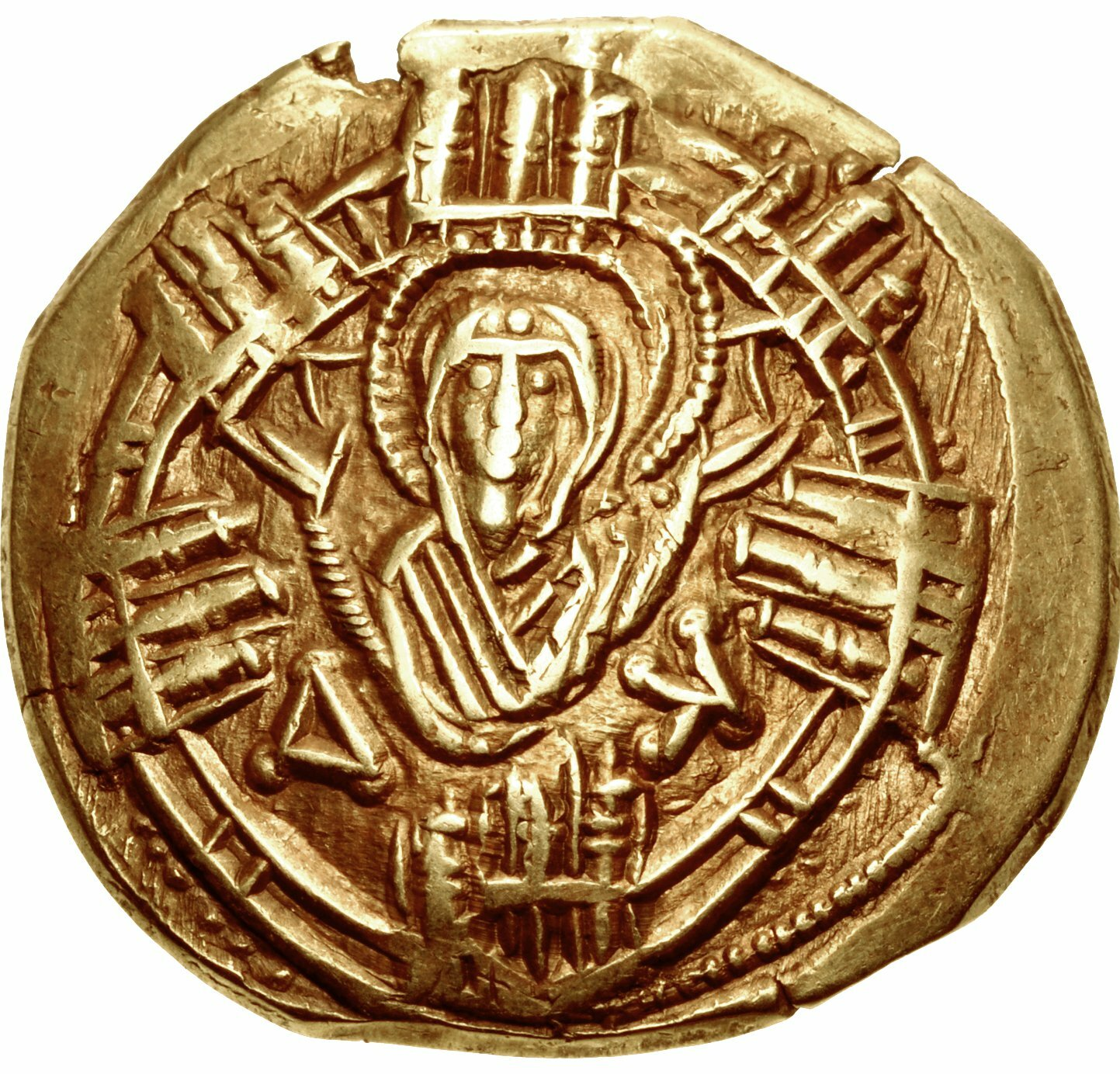
Coin of Michael VIII, depicting the Virgin Mary rising over the walls of Constantinople, in commemoration of the capture of the city over the Latins.

Byzantine envoys presented themselves at the Second Council of Lyon 24 June 1274, where they presented a letter from the Emperor, sealed with the imperial golden bull, and two others from his son Andronikos and the Byzantine clergy. On the fourth session of the Council the formal act of union was performed. The letters were read, and for the first time in two centuries representatives of the major Eastern and Western branches of Christianity were again in communion.

Michael VIII achieved an important advantage by this union, for now he gained legitimacy both for possessing Constantinople and for his claims to the lands occupied by Western invaders. Further, his antagonist Charles could not rely on the power of the pope calling for a crusade against his realm. Lastly, Pope Gregory was very favorable to Michael's proposal for a crusade against the Turks to restore the ancient Christian cities of Anatolia; however with Gregory's death (January 1276), these plans remained nothing more than talk.

More disappointments followed as news of the Council filtered through the former Byzantine territories. While the union was opposed at all levels of society, it was especially opposed by the greater populace, led by the monks and the adherents of the deposed Patriarch Arsenios, known as the Arsenites. One of the chief anti-unionist leaders was Michael's own sister Eulogia, who fled to the court of her daughter Maria Palaiologina Kantakouzene, Tsarina of the Bulgars, from where she intrigued unsuccessfully against Michael. More serious was the opposition of the sons of Michael of Epirus, Nikephoros I Komnenos Doukas and his half-brother John I Doukas: they posed as the defenders of Orthodoxy and gave support to the anti-unionists fleeing Constantinople. Michael at first responded with comparative leniency, hoping to win the anti-unionists through persuasion, but eventually the virulence of the protests led him to resort to force. Many anti-unionists were blinded or exiled. Two prominent monks, Meletios and Ignatios, were punished: the first had his tongue cut out, the second was blinded. Even imperial officials were harshly treated, and the death penalty was decreed even for simply reading or possessing pamphlets directed against the Emperor. "From the intensity of these disorders, tantamount almost to civil wars," concludes Geanakoplos, "it might appear that too great a price had been paid for the sake of union."

The religious situation only worsened for Michael. The Arsenite party found widespread support amongst the discontented in the Anatolian provinces, and Michael responded there with similar viciousness: according to Vryonis, "These elements were either removed from the armies or else, alienated, they deserted to the Turks". Another attempt to clear the encroaching Turkmen from the Meaender valley in 1278 found limited success, but Antioch on the Maeander was irretrievably lost as were Tralles and Nyssa four years later.

On 1 May 1277, John convoked a synod at Neopatras that anathematized the Emperor, Patriarch, and Pope as heretics. In response, a synod was convoked at the Hagia Sophia on 16 July where both Nikephoros and John were anathematized in return. John called a final synod at Neopatras in December 1277, where an anti-unionist council of eight bishops, a few abbots, and one hundred monks, again anathematized the Emperor, Patriarch, and Pope.

Michael's achievements on the battlefield were more positive, although still mixed. He tried to take advantage of a civil war in Bulgaria in the late 1270s, but the Byzantine armies suffered several major defeats at the hands of the peasant Emperor Ivaylo. The Emperor managed to temporarily impose his son-in-law Ivan Asen III on the Bulgarian throne, but after the Byzantine defeat at Devina he had to flee. However, Michael VIII later managed to conquer the Bulgarian portion of Thrace, while the internal situation of the Bulgarian Empire remained unstable. In 1275, Michael VIII sent an army against Thessaly and fleet of 73 ships to harass the Latin states in Greece. The army was crushingly defeated at the Battle of Neopatras, but the fleet won a similarly comprehensive victory at the Battle of Demetrias.

Last was his victory over Charles of Anjou in western Greece. Charles' general Hugh of Sully with 8,000 men (including 2,000 cavalry) captured Butrinto in 1280 and besieged Berat. A Byzantine army of relief under Michael Tarchaneiotes arrived in March 1281: Hugh of Sully was ambushed and captured, and his army put to flight. Geanaklopos considers that most scholars do not appreciate fully the importance of this victory: "this victory marked the complete failure of the attempt to launch a land expedition against the capital. Thus ... Charles had to shift his strategy to a sea attack against Constantinople".

== Sicilian Vespers ==
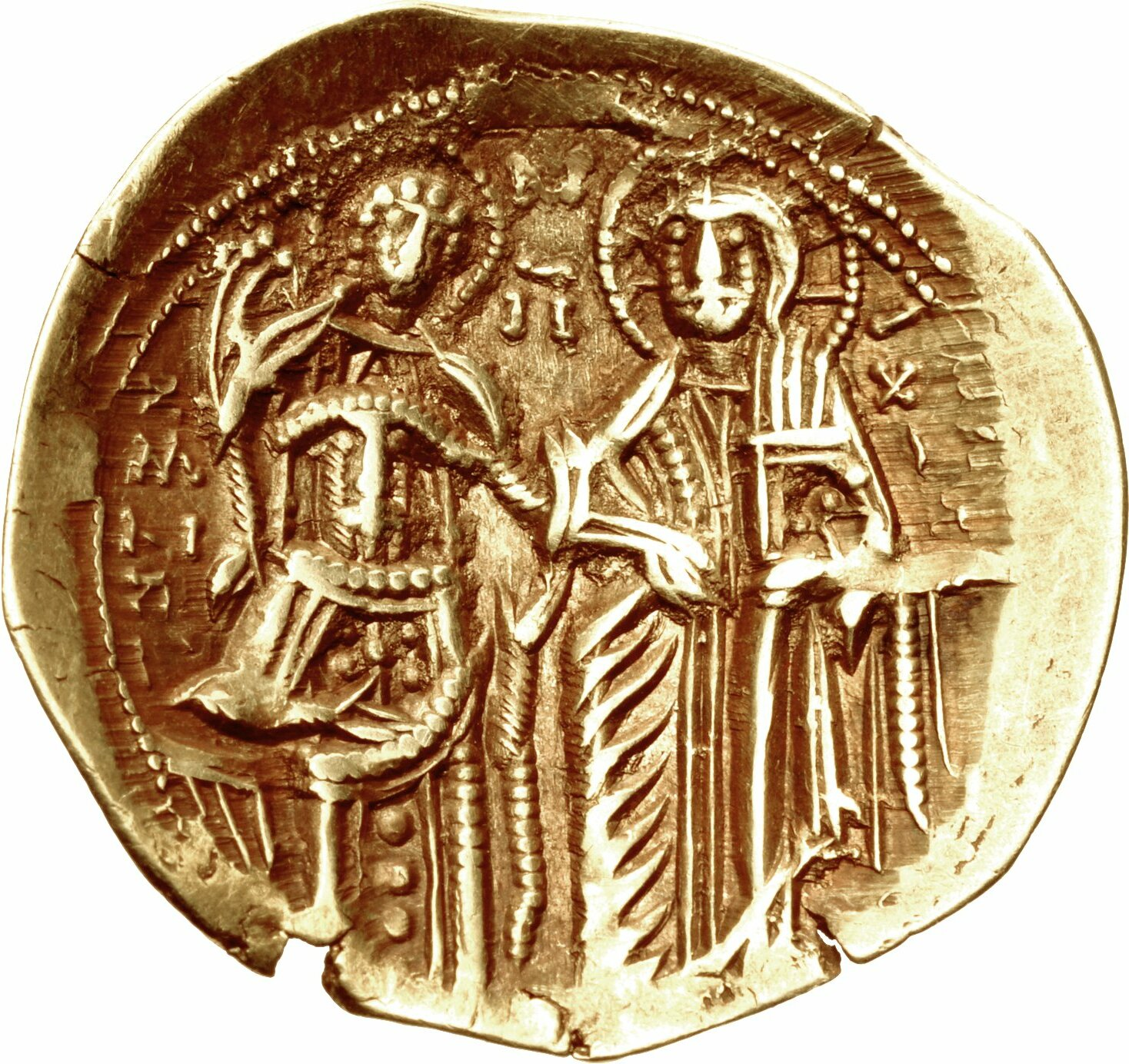
Gold hyperpyron of Michael VIII, shown (bottom left) kneeling before Christ (right), under the injunction of Archangel Michael (top left)

On 22 February 1281 a new Pope was selected, Pope Martin IV, a Frenchman Geanaklopos describes as "blindly subservient" to Charles of Anjou. Once again, Charles had no clear brake on his ambitions to conquer Constantinople, and he moved swiftly to prepare for this new offensive. One early move was taken by Pope Martin, who on 10 April 1281, excommunicated Michael without any warning or provocation, thus disrupting the union of Lyons.

Charles had prepared a military force far larger than Michael could muster. According to Marino Sanudo, Charles had 100 ships in Sicily, and 300 more in Naples, Provence, and his Greek territories, which were to carry no fewer than 8,000 cavalrymen. Geanakoplos cites surviving documents that attest to the supplies Charles had accumulated. One Angevin rescript, dated 28 October 1281, lists a collection of tools to be gathered for the expedition, which includes "two thousand iron mattocks, three thousand iron stakes, sledges for smashing rocks, ropes, iron shovels, axes, and kettles for boiling pitch." Another orders the delivery of "four thousand iron stakes that are under construction in Venice." A third consists of instructions to a Pisan merchant for 2,500 shields of various sizes, all to be emblazoned with his royal emblem of lilies. Allied with Charles were a long list of powers. Besides having ties of kinship with the Kings of France and Hungary, the rulers of the Serbs and Bulgars were his allies, as well as the rulers of Epirus and dissidents of the Byzantine Empire, and the leading naval power of Europe, Venice.

Obviously Michael sought allies against Charles of Anjou, but they were few. Donald Nicol lists the Mamluk Sultan of Egypt, who would "loan him ships", and the Tatars of the Golden Horde in South Russia who "could keep an eye on the Bulgarians". His ambassadors visited the court of Roman-German King Rudolph I of Habsburg, but he was aloof. King Peter III of Aragon proved more welcoming, for he had his own reasons to hate Charles. According to Geanakoplos, Peter's wife Constance was the daughter of Manfred, and for this reason Peter considered Charles a usurper and Sicily the rightful property of Constance. Peter welcomed refugees from Sicily, most notably John of Procida, whom he made secretary of the royal chancery. Yet Aragon was at the other end of the Mediterranean, far from Michael.

Before Charles of Anjou could start for Constantinople, however, the Sicilian Vespers rebellion struck, on 30 March 1282. Charles sent four ships to handle the revolt, but when the rebels took control of Messina, he ordered the men and materiel assembled for use against Michael to besiege that city; meanwhile seventy Angevin ships at the arsenal of Messina were destroyed. Eventually Charles lifted the siege, and Peter of Aragon landed in Sicily to reclaim the island for his wife. Beginning with Pope Martin's bull dated 18 November 1282, wherein he again excommunicated Michael—as well as Peter of Aragon, John of Procida, and Michael's emissary Benedetto Zaccaria—as the author of the conspiracy that led to the Sicilian Vespers, Michael has been seen as the instigator. Geanakoplos, while admitting that Michael was in contact with the leaders of the revolt beforehand, asserts "that Michael Palaeologus, on his part, had nothing to do with the incident at the church of Santo Spirito is beyond question."

Furthermore, Michael VIII was instrumental in instigating revolts in Crete against the Venetians, the most famous of which was led by the Hortatzoi brothers Georgios and Theodore of Mesi in Rethymnon, with a duration of six years, causing most significant harm to the Venetian occupants and economic interests of Venice. Michael VIII had aimed to eventually bring Venice, an ally of Charles of Anjou, to the table of negotiations, as he did, at his court in Constantinople.

== Family ==
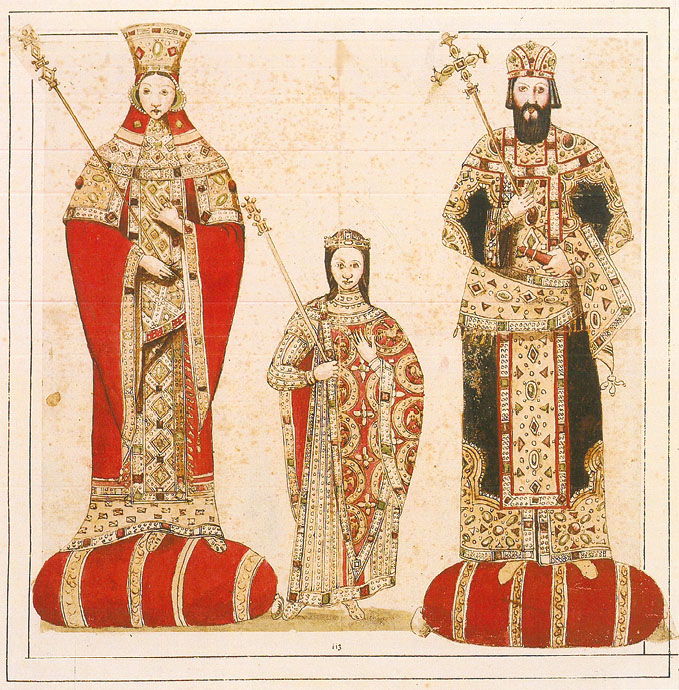
Reproduction of a lost Byzantine miniature in the Peribleptos Monastery, Mystras, portraying Michael VIII alongside Theodora and Constantine.

In 1253, Michael VIII Palaiologos married Theodora Palaiologina, a grandniece of John III Doukas Vatatzes, Emperor of Nicaea. Orphaned in childhood, she was raised by her great-uncle John III, who was said to have "loved her like a daughter", and who arranged for her marriage to Michael. Their children were:

- Manuel Palaiologos (c. 1255–before 1259)
- Irene Palaiologina (c. 1256–before 1328), who married emperor Ivan Asen III of Bulgaria
- Andronikos II Palaiologos (1259–1332), Byzantine emperor
- Anna Palaiologina (c. 1260–1299/1300), who married Demetrios/Michael Komnenos Doukas, third son of Michael II of Epirus
- Constantine Palaiologos (1261–1306), who married Eirene Raoulaina his second cousin
- Theodora Palaiologina, who married King David VI of Georgia
- Eudokia Palaiologina, who married Emperor John II of Trebizond
- Theodore Palaiologos (c. 1263 – after 1310)

By a mistress, a Diplovatatzina, Michael VIII also had two illegitimate daughters:

- Euphrosyne Palaiologina, who married Nogai Khan of the Golden Horde
- Maria Palaiologina, who married Abaqa Khan of Ilkhanid Persia

== Death and legacy ==
Michael VIII died in Pachomios village, Thrace, on 11 December 1282. He was denied burial in Constantinople due to his persecution of the Church in support of union with Rome, so was instead laid to rest in a monastery called Nea Mone in the region of Rhaidestos (modern Tekirdağ). Three years later, in 1285, his remains were moved to the monastery of Christ in Selymbria, where in 1260 he had reburied the body of Basil II.

In reconstituting the Byzantine Empire Michael VIII restored the old administration without endeavouring to correct its failures. In recovering Constantinople and investing in the defence of his European provinces, Michael VIII began to denude the Anatolian frontier of its troops and was forced to lower their pay or cancel their tax exemptions. This policy led to the gradual collapse of the frontier, which was infiltrated by Turkish bands even before his death. The Palaiologan dynasty he established ruled the Byzantine Empire for almost two centuries, longer than any other in Roman history. Also, during his reign there was a temporary naval revival in which the Byzantine navy consisted of 80 ships.

== See also ==
- List of Byzantine emperors

== Sources ==
- Akropolites, George (2007) [c. 1261]. The History. Translated by Ruth Macrides. Oxford University Press. ISBN 978-0191568718.
- Geanakoplos, Deno John (1959). Emperor Michael Palaeologus and the West, 1258–1282: A Study in Byzantine-Latin Relations. Cambridge, Massachusetts: Harvard University Press.
- This article incorporates text from a publication now in the public domain: Chisholm, Hugh, ed. (1911). "Michael (emperors)". Encyclopædia Britannica. Vol. 18 (11th ed.). Cambridge University Press. pp. 359–360.
- Kazhdan, Alexander, ed. (1991). "Michael VIII Palaiologos". The Oxford Dictionary of Byzantium. Oxford University Press. p. 1367.
- Nicol, Donald M. (1993) [1972]. The Last Centuries of Byzantium, 1261–1453 (Second ed.). Cambridge: Cambridge University Press. ISBN 978-0-521-43991-6.
- Talbot, Alice-Mary (1992). "Empress Theodora Palaiologina, Wife of Michael VIII". Dumbarton Oaks Papers. 46. Washington, D.C.: 295–303. doi:10.2307/1291662. JSTOR 1291662.
- Spatharakis, Ioannis (1976), The Portrait in Byzantine Illuminated Manuscripts, Brill, ISBN 978-9633862971
- Trapp, Erich; Beyer, Hans-Veit; Walther, Rainer; Sturm-Schnabl, Katja; Kislinger, Ewald; Leontiadis, Ioannis; Kaplaneres, Sokrates (1976–1996). Prosopographisches Lexikon der Palaiologenzeit (in German). Vienna: Verlag der Österreichischen Akademie der Wissenschaften. ISBN 3-7001-3003-1.

Michael VIII Palaiologos Palaiologos dynasty Born: 1224 Died: 11 December 1282
Regnal titles
Preceded by Baldwin II as Latin Emperor	Byzantine emperor 1261–1282 with Andronikos II Palaiologos (1272–1282)	Succeeded by Andronikos II Palaiologos
Preceded by John IV Laskaris	Emperor of Nicaea; 1 January 1259 – 11 December 1282 with John IV Laskaris (1258–1261)	Byzantine Empire restored
