= George Akropolites =

Byzantine Greek historian and statesman

- Born: Georgios Akropolites; 1217 or 1220; Constantinople, Byzantine Empire
- Died: 1282
- Scientific career
- Fields: History; Diplomacy; Philosophy; Mathematics
- Workplaces: University of Constantinople
- Academic advisors: Nikephoros Blemmydes; Theodore Hexapterygos
- Notable students: George of Cyprus; George Pachymeres; John Pediasimos

George Akropolites (Latinized as Acropolites or Acropolita; Greek: Γεώργιος Ἀκροπολίτης, Georgios Akropolites; 1217 or 1220 – 1282) was a Byzantine historian and statesman, born in Constantinople.

== Life ==
In his sixteenth year, he was sent by his father, the logothete Constantine Akropolites the elder, to the court of John III Doukas Vatatzes, emperor of Nicaea, where Akropolites continued his studies under Theodore Hexapterygos and Nikephoros Blemmydes. The emperor afterwards entrusted George with important state missions, as did his successors (Theodore II Laskaris and Michael VIII Palaiologos). The office of Grand Logothete, or chancellor, was bestowed upon him in 1244. He tutored Theodore II during the 1240s.

As commander in the field in 1257 against Michael II, despot of Epirus, he showed little military ability. George was captured and kept for two years in prison, from which he was released by Michael Palaiologos. Meanwhile, Michael Palaiologos was proclaimed emperor of Nicaea, afterwards expelling the Latins from Constantinople, and became emperor of the restored Byzantine Empire. From this moment, Akropolites becomes known in the history of the eastern empire as one of its greatest diplomats. After having discharged the function of ambassador at the court of the Bulgarian Tsar Constantine, he became the first head of the University of Constantinople, where he lectured on mathematics and philosophy. His students included George of Cyprus and George Pachymeres.

In the meantime, Michael, afraid of a new Latin invasion, proposed to Pope Clement IV to reunite the Greek and the Latin Churches; and negotiations ensued which were carried on during the reign of five popes, Clement IV, Gregory X, John XXI, Nicolaus III, and Martin IV. Akropolites was chosen as the emperor's ambassador, and in 1273 he was sent to Pope Gregory X. In 1274, at the Second Council of Lyon, he confirmed by an oath in the emperor's name that the confession of faith which had been previously sent to Constantinople by the pope had been adopted by the Greeks. The reunion of the two churches however roused considerable opposition in Byzantium and was afterwards broken off. It did however serve its main purpose, delaying and ultimately entirely averting a Latin attack on Constantinople.

Later negotiations George Akropolites led included leading a mission to the Empire of Trebizond in 1281 to convince the Emperor John II to discontinue using the title of "Emperor and Autocrat of the Romans"—which Michael Palaiologos held as his sole right. He failed in this endeavor, for John responded to his arguments that he was simply following the practice of his predecessors, and his chief nobles would not permit him to give up this honor.

William Smith in his Dictionary of Greek and Roman Biography and Mythology follows Hankius De Byzantinarum Rerum Scriptoribus Graecis in stating that Akropolites was sent on an embassy to the king of Bulgaria in 1282; George Finlay has shown that both are in error. Finlay notes, "in this case he [Hankius] seems inadvertently to have written Bulgarorum instead of Lazorum Principem, for he quotes at length the passage of Pachymeres as his authority, which states distinctly that Acropolita was sent to the prince of the Lazes, as the vain Constantinopolitan writers called the emperor of Trebizond."

== Works ==
Akropolites' historical work, the Annals, embraces the period from the capture of Constantinople during the Fourth Crusade by the Latins in 1204 to its recovery by Michael Palaiologos in 1261, thus forming a continuation of the work of Nicetas Choniates. It is valuable as written by a contemporary, whose official position as Grand Logothete, military commander, and confidential ambassador afforded him frequent opportunities of observing the course of events.

Akropolites is considered a trustworthy authority as far as the statement of facts is concerned, and he is easy to understand, although he exhibits special carelessness in the construction of his sentences. His style is archaising but lucid. He was also the author of several shorter works, amongst them being a funeral oration on John Vatatzes, an epitaph on his wife Irene Laskarina and a panegyric of Theodore II Laskaris of Nicaea. While a prisoner at Epirus he wrote two treatises on the procession of the Holy Spirit.

In 1274, Akropolites wrote an encomium On Saints Peter and Paul while staying in Capua on his way to the Council of Lyon. He wrote it at the request of Archbishop Marino Filomarino.

== Editions ==
Authorities: Editio princeps by Leo Allatius (1651), with the editor's famous treatise De Georgiis eorumque Scriptis; editions in the Bonn Corpus Scriptorum Hist. Byz., by I. Bekker (1836), and Migne, Patrologia Graeca, cxl; in the Teubner series by A. Heisenberg (1903), the second volume of which contains a full life, with bibliography; see also Karl Krumbacher, Geschichte der byzantinischen Litteratur (1897).

- A. Heisenberg (ed). Georgii Akropolitae Opera. Vol. 1-2 (Leipzig, 1903); reprinted with corrections by P. Wirth (Stuttgart, 1978).
- Ruth Macrides (intr. and comm.), George Akropolites. The History (Oxford, Oxford University Press, 2007) (Oxford Studies in Byzantium).
- French translation Acropolitès: chronique du XIIIe siècle by Jean Dayantis, Les Belles Lettres ed., collection "La roue à livres", Paris 2012.
- Spanish translation in: Jorge Acropólites: Narración histórica. Estudio preliminar, traducción, notas y comentarios de Teresa Vila Vilar. Granada: Centro de Estudios Bizantinos, Neogriegos y Chipriotas, 2012.

== See also ==
- Constantine Akropolites, his son
