= Byzantine–Venetian treaty =

Byzantine–Venetian treaty may refer to:

- Byzantine–Venetian treaty of 1082
- Byzantine–Venetian treaty of 1265
- Byzantine–Venetian treaty of 1268
- Byzantine–Venetian treaty of 1277
- Byzantine–Venetian treaty of 1285
- Byzantine–Venetian treaty of 1390

== See also ==
- Nicaean–Venetian treaty of 1219
