= 1281 =

1281 in various calendars
- Gregorian calendar: 1281; MCCLXXXI
- Ab urbe condita: 2034
- Armenian calendar: 730; ԹՎ ՉԼ
- Assyrian calendar: 6031
- Balinese saka calendar: 1202–1203
- Bengali calendar: 687–688
- Berber calendar: 2231
- English Regnal year: 9 Edw. 1 – 10 Edw. 1
- Buddhist calendar: 1825
- Burmese calendar: 643
- Byzantine calendar: 6789–6790
- Chinese calendar: 庚辰年 (Metal Dragon); 3978 or 3771 — to — 辛巳年 (Metal Snake); 3979 or 3772
- Coptic calendar: 997–998
- Discordian calendar: 2447
- Ethiopian calendar: 1273–1274
- Hebrew calendar: 5041–5042
- Hindu calendars
- Vikram Samvat: 1337–1338
- Shaka Samvat: 1202–1203
- Kali Yuga: 4381–4382
- Holocene calendar: 11281
- Igbo calendar: 281–282
- Iranian calendar: 659–660
- Islamic calendar: 679–680
- Japanese calendar: Kōan 4 (弘安４年)
- Javanese calendar: 1191–1192
- Julian calendar: 1281; MCCLXXXI
- Korean calendar: 3614
- Minguo calendar: 631 before ROC 民前631年
- Nanakshahi calendar: −187
- Thai solar calendar: 1823–1824
- Tibetan calendar: ལྕགས་ཕོ་འབྲུག་ལོ་ (male Iron-Dragon); 1407 or 1026 or 254 — to — ལྕགས་མོ་སྦྲུལ་ལོ་ (female Iron-Snake); 1408 or 1027 or 255

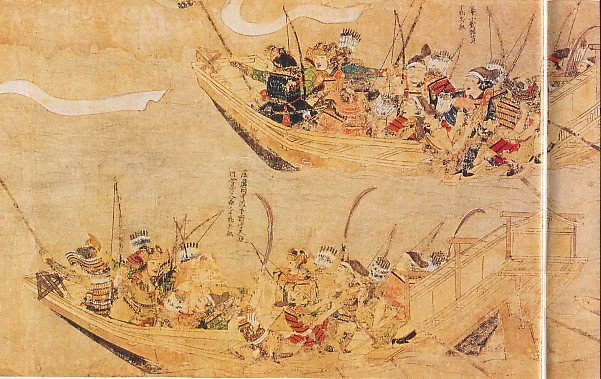
Japanese attack Mongol ships, Mōko Shūrai Ekotoba (c. 1291)

Year 1281 (MCCLXXXI) was a common year starting on Wednesday of the Julian calendar.

== Events ==
=== By place ===
==== Byzantine Empire ====
- Spring – Siege of Berat: A Byzantine relief force under Michael Tarchaneiotes arrives at the strategically important citadel of Berat. Tarchaneiotes avoids a confrontation with the Angevines and relies on ambushes and raids instead. He manages to capture the Angevin commander, Hugh of Sully. A few of Sully's guards escape and reach their camp, where they report his capture. Panic spreads among the Angevin troops at this news and they begin to flee towards Avlon. The Byzantines take advantage of their disordered flight and attack, joined by the troops in the besieged citadel. Tarchaneiotes takes an enormous booty while a small remnant of the Angevin army manages to cross the Vjosa River and reach the safety of Kanina.
- October 18 – Emperor Michael VIII Palaiologos is excommunicated by Pope Martin IV without any warning or provocation. Martin authorizes Charles I, king of Sicily, to make a Crusade against Michael, who has re-established his rule in Constantinople. Charles prepares an expedition in Sicily and assembles a fleet of 100 ships, and 300 more in Naples, Provence, and the Greek territories, which carry some 8,000 cavalrymen.

==== Europe ====
- June – Reconquista: Castilian forces led by King Alfonso X ("the Wise") and accompanied by his sons, the Infantes Sancho, Peter and John, invade the lowlands of Granada. Sultan Muhammad II of Granada sends a Moorish army, supported by many archers and cavalry, to repel them. Alfonso defeats the Moors in a battle near Granada's walls on June 25, but after the failure of the negotiations that follow, he leaves Granada.
- July 3 – Treaty of Orvieto: Charles I, Giovanni Dandolo, doge of Venice, and Philip I, Latin emperor, make an agreement to recover the Latin Empire. The treaty is signed in the Papal Palace, which Martin IV has moved to Orvieto after Viterbo is placed under an interdict for imprisoning two cardinals.

==== Middle East ====
- September – Two Mongol armies (some 50,000 men) advance into Syria. One is commanded by Abaqa Khan, who attacks the Mamluk fortresses along the Euphrates frontier. The second, led by his brother Möngke Temür makes contact with Leo III, king of Cilician Armenia, and then marches down through Aintab and Aleppo into the Orontes valley, where he is joined by Knights Hospitallerr and some French mercenaries. Meanwhile, Sultan Qalawun assembles his Mamluk forces at Damascus.
- October 29 – Second Battle of Homs: In a pitched battle, Mamluk forces (some 30,000 men) led by Qalawun destroy the Mongol center; Möngke Temür is wounded and flees. He orders a retreat, followed by a disorganized army. The Armenian-Georgian auxiliaries under Leo III fight their way back northwards. The Mongol army recrosses the Euphrates without losses; the river remains the frontier between the Mongols and the Mamluk Sultanate.
- Osman I, founder of the Ottoman Empire, becomes bey of the Söğüt tribe in central Anatolia after the death of his father, Ertuğrul Ghazi. Osman's accession to power is not peaceful, as he has to fight his relatives before he gets hold of the clan's leadership. One of Osman's major rivals is his uncle Dündar Bey, who rebels against him.

==== Asia ====
- August 15 – Battle of Kōan (or Second Battle of Hakata Bay): A second Mongol invasion of Japan is foiled, as a large typhoon, famously called a kamikaze, or 'divine wind', destroys much of the combined Mongol and Chinese fleet and forces, numbering over 140,000 men and 4,000 ships. Later, Kublai Khan begins to gather forces to prepare for a third invasion attempt, but is distracted by events in Southeast and Central Asia.
- Kublai Khan orders the burning of sacred Taoist texts, resulting in the reduction in number of volumes of the Daozang (Taoist Canon) from 4,565 to 1,120.
- The Mon Kingdom of Hariphunchai falls, as its capital Lamphun (in modern-day Thailand) is captured by King Mangrai's Lannathai Kingdom.

=== By topic ===
==== Markets ====
- Guy of Dampierre, count of Flanders, licenses the first Lombard merchants to open a changing business in his realm.

==== Religion ====
- February 22 – Frenchman Simon de Brion succeeds Nicholas III as Pope Martin IV, becoming the 189th pope of the Catholic Church.

== Births ==
(some dates approximate)

- May 18 – Agnes of Austria, queen consort of Hungary (House of Árpád) (d. 1364)
- August 4 – Külüg Khan (or Wuzong), Mongol emperor (d. 1311)
- December 25 – Alice de Lacy, English noblewoman (d. 1348)
- Maurice de Berkeley, English nobleman (d. 1326)
- Castruccio Castracani, Italian nobleman and knight (d. 1328)
- Hamdallah Mustawfi, Persian official and historian (d. 1340)
- Henry of Lancaster, English nobleman and knight (d. 1345)
- Joan Butler (or FitzGerald), Irish countess of Carrick (d. 1320)
- John Harington, English nobleman and politician (d. 1347)
- John Stonor, English lawyer and Chief Justice (d. 1354)
- Orhan Ghazi, Turkish ruler of the Ottoman Empire (d. 1362)
- Nizamüddin Ahmed Pasha, Ottoman statesmen (d. 1380)
- Richard Grey, English nobleman and diplomat (d. 1335)
- Sancia of Majorca, queen consort and regent of Naples (d. 1345)
- Yury of Moscow (Yuri III Danilovich), Grand Prince of Vladimir (d. 1325)
- Zhu Shizhen, Chinese founder of the Ming dynasty (d. 1344)

== Deaths ==
- February 1 or 17 – Bruno von Schauenburg, German bishop, advisor and diplomat
- February 16 – Gertrude of Hohenberg, queen of Germany (b. 1225)
- March 20 – Chabi, Mongol empress consort of Kublai Khan (b. 1225)
- March 30 – Conrad of Mure, Swiss monk, scholar and writer (b. 1210)
- April 4 – Maurice de Berkeley, English nobleman and knight (b. 1218)
- September 10 – John II, margrave of Brandenburg-Stendal (b. 1237)
- September 20 – Reinhard I, Lord of Hanau, German nobleman and knight (b. 1225)
- October 8 – Constance of Greater Poland, Polish princess (b. 1245)
- December 24 – Henry V ("the Great"), count of Luxembourg (b. 1216)
- Alfonso Fernández el Niño, Spanish nobleman and prince (b. 1243)
- Anna of Hungary, Byzantine empress consort (House of Árpád) (b. 1260)
- Sheikh Yusof Sarvestani, Persian astronomer and calligrapher
- Xu Heng, Chinese scholar, official and philosopher (b. 1209)
- c. 1280/1281 – Ertuğrul Ghazi, Turkish ruler of the Sultanate of Rum (b. 1198)
