= List of Byzantine treaties =

This is a list of the treaties and agreements signed during the history of the Eastern Roman or Byzantine Empire. The definition of a treaty is any agreement between the Byzantine Empire and any foreign power, including peace agreements, trade agreements, and understandings between the two powers. For external conflicts see Byzantine wars.

== Valentinian–Theodosian dynasty (364–457) ==
- Peace of Acilisene (c.387) – Peace treaty between Sassanid Empire and Eastern Roman Empire, dividing Greater Armenia in half.

== Justinian dynasty (518–602) ==
- Eternal Peace (532), between the Byzantines and Sassanid Persia
- Fifty-Year Peace Treaty (562) – between Byzantines and Sassanid Persia

== Non-dynastic (711–717) ==
- Byzantine–Bulgarian Treaty of 716 – Officially ends the Battle of Anchialus and establishes the borders between Byzantium and the Bulgarian Empire.

== Nikephoros' dynasty (802–813) ==
- Pax Nicephori (803) peace treaty between Charlemagne and Nicephorus I

== Non-dynastic (813–820) ==
- Byzantine–Bulgarian Treaty of 815 with the Bulgarian Empire.

== Macedonian dynasty (867–1056) ==
- Rus'–Byzantine Treaty (907)
- Rus'–Byzantine Treaty (911)
- Rus'–Byzantine Treaty (945)
- Treaty of Safar (970)
- Byzantine–Georgian treaty of 1022
- Byzantine–Georgian treaty of 1031

== Doukid dynasty (1059–1081) ==
- Byzantine–Norman treaty of 1074 with Robert Guiscard

== Komnenian dynasty (1081–1185) ==
- Byzantine–Venetian Treaty of 1082
- Treaty of Devol (1108) with Bohemond I of Antioch
- Treaty of Antioch (1137) with Raymond of Poitiers

== Laskarid dynasty (Empire of Nicaea, 1204–1261) ==
- Treaty of Nymphaeum (1214)
- Nicaean–Venetian Treaty of 1219
- Nicaean–Latin Armistice of 1260
- Treaty of Nymphaeum (1261)

== Palaiologan dynasty (1261–1453) ==
- Byzantine–Venetian treaty of 1268
- Byzantine–Venetian treaty of 1277
- Byzantine–Trapezuntine treaty of 1282
- Byzantine–Venetian treaty of 1285
- Byzantine–Venetian treaty of 1302
- Byzantine–Venetian treaty of 1310
- Byzantine–Venetian treaty of 1324
- Treaty of Chernomen (1327)
- Byzantine–Venetian treaty of 1332
- Byzantine–Aydinid alliance (1335)
- Byzantine–Venetian treaty of 1342
- Byzantine–Venetian treaty of 1357
- Byzantine–Venetian treaty of 1363
- Byzantine–Venetian treaty of 1370
- Byzantine–Venetian treaty of 1376
- Byzantine–Venetian treaty of 1390
- Treaty of Gallipoli (1403) – agreement that released the Byzantine Empire of vassalage to the Ottoman Empire and extensive territorial additions.
- Byzantine–Venetian treaty of 1406
- Byzantine–Venetian treaty of 1412
- Byzantine–Venetian treaty of 1418
- Byzantine–Venetian treaty of 1423
- Byzantine–Venetian treaty of 1431
- Byzantine–Venetian treaty of 1436
- Byzantine–Venetian treaty of 1442
- Byzantine–Venetian treaty of 1448

== Sources ==
- Bartusis, Mark C. (1997). The Late Byzantine Army: Arms and Society 1204–1453. University of Pennsylvania Press. ISBN 0-8122-1620-2.
- Cavallo, Guglielmo (1997). The Byzantines. University of Chicago Press. ISBN 978-0-226-09792-3.
- Laiou, Angeliki (2009). "Political-historical survey - D. 1204-1453". In Jeffreys, Elizabeth; Haldon, John; Cormack, Robin (eds.). The Oxford Handbook of Byzantine Studies. Oxford University Press. ISBN 978-0-19-925246-6.
- Nicol, Donald MacGillivray (1993). The Last Centuries of Byzantium, 1261–1453. Cambridge University Press. ISBN 978-0-521-43991-6.
- Nicol, Donald MacGillivray (1996). The Reluctant Emperor: A Biography of John Cantacuzene, Byzantine Emperor and Monk, C. 1295–1383. Cambridge University Press. ISBN 978-0-521-52201-4.
