= Peace of Nisibis =

Peace of Nisibis may refer to the following treaties signed in Nisibis (modern Nusaybin, Turkey):

- Peace of Nisibis (299), between the Roman Empire and the Sasanian Empire, ended the Roman-Sassanian War of 296–299
- Peace of Nisibis (363), between the Roman Empire and the Sasanian Empire, ended the Perso-Roman War of 363

== See also ==
- List of Byzantine foreign treaties
- List of treaties
