= 1989 Iraqi–Saudi Treaty of Nonaggression =

- Type: Non-aggression pact
- Signed: March 27, 1989
- Location: Baghdad, Iraq
- Expiration: Became effectively void following Iraq’s invasion of Kuwait in August 1990
- Language: Arabic

The 1989 Iraqi–Saudi Treaty of Nonaggression (Arabic: معاهدة عدم الاعتداء العراقية–السعودية لعام 1989) was a bilateral agreement between the Republic of Iraq and the Kingdom of Saudi Arabia, signed in March 1989. This pact formally committed the two Middle Eastern neighbors to a stance of mutual non-aggression and non-interference, aiming to prevent conflict or meddling in each other's internal affairs. The treaty was concluded in the aftermath of the eight-year Iran–Iraq war (1980–1988) and amidst shifting regional alliances. Iraqi President Saddam Hussein and Saudi King Fahd bin Abdulaziz endorsed the agreement during King Fahd's high-profile visit to Baghdad, where he received a warm welcome and personally met with Saddam.

This nonaggression pact is significant as an effort to solidify Arab unity and assure stability in the Persian Gulf at a time of uncertainty. It was intended to reassure Saudi Arabia and other Gulf states about Iraq's intentions after the Iran–Iraq War and Iraq's new regional initiatives. The accord's tone balanced diplomatic reconciliation with practical security concerns: it codified principles of peaceful coexistence even as Baghdad and Riyadh were maneuvering for influence in a changing Middle Eastern geopolitical landscape.

== Background ==
The Iran–Iraq War ended in August 1988, leaving Iraq militarily strong but economically strained. Iraq had accrued massive debts (estimated at \$60–80 billion) during the war, much of it owed to Gulf Arab states like Saudi Arabia and Kuwait that had financially backed Baghdad's war effort. Although Iraq emerged claiming a sort of victory, the war's end removed the common threat (revolutionary Iran) that had unified Iraq with its Arab neighbors. Almost immediately, new uncertainties arose about Iraq's post-war intentions and its role in the Gulf. Saddam Hussein's regime was financially burdened and seeking regional leadership, promoting itself as the champion of Arab nationalism after fighting Iran. At the same time, Gulf monarchies that had supported Iraq were relieved at Iran's containment but grew wary that a battle-hardened Iraq might now turn its ambitions toward them.

During the war with Iran, Saudi Arabia and Iraq had maintained strong if quiet cooperation, as Riyadh funneled financial support to Baghdad to counter Iranian influence. With the war over, Saudi Arabia's strategic calculus shifted. The kingdom was pleased that Iraq had checked Iran's revolutionary expansion, but it also feared Iraq's large military and Saddam's aggressive rhetoric. In 1988 and 1989 King Fahd signaled publicly that Saudi Arabia would work to maintain moderate oil prices (around $18 per barrel) specifically so that Iraq would focus on economic reconstruction rather than military adventures. This oil policy was a subtle way to constrain Saddam's regional ambitions by limiting his revenue – an objective that was formally registered in the 1989 nonaggression pact itself. In other words, Saudi Arabia wanted to support Iraq's stability but also ensure Saddam Hussein remained preoccupied with rebuilding his country, not threatening his neighbors.

A major catalyst for the treaty was Iraq's formation of the Arab Cooperation Council (ACC) in February 1989. This new regional bloc brought together Iraq with three non-Gulf Arab states – Jordan, Egypt, and North Yemen (Yemen Arab Republic) – purportedly to foster economic cooperation and integration. The ACC's charter emphasized economic collaboration, such as labor movement and trade, to help members recover from the oil-price downturn of the 1980s and, in Iraq's case, to aid post-war reconstruction. For instance, in mid-1989 the ACC members dropped visa requirements to enable the flow of Egyptian and Jordanian workers into Iraq's rebuilding economy. However, despite its economic veneer, the ACC carried significant geopolitical overtones. It informally aligned two of the Arab world's strongest armies (Iraq and Egypt) along with key allies of Baghdad (Jordan and North Yemen) into a loose alliance.

From Saudi Arabia's perspective, the ACC's emergence was alarming. The Gulf Cooperation Council (GCC) – the Saudi-led bloc of Gulf monarchies (established in 1981) – had deliberately excluded Iraq, and now suddenly Iraq was leading a parallel alliance. The ACC looked to some observers like an attempt to “surround” the GCC states with a ring of populous, heavily armed Arab nations outside Saudi influence. Notably, the inclusion of North Yemen in the ACC raised red flags in Riyadh. North Yemen bordered Saudi Arabia, and there was long-standing Saudi interest in Yemeni affairs; seeing Sanaa tilt toward Baghdad's orbit was unsettling. Moreover, Iraq and ACC members began taking stances that worried the Gulf rulers – for example, in early 1990 at an ACC meeting, Saddam Hussein called for U.S. naval forces to withdraw from the Gulf, a posture that confirmed Gulf leaders’ suspicions about the ACC's political motives.

The power imbalance created by the ACC spurred Saudi Arabia to action. The prospect of Iraq potentially coordinating with Egypt and Jordan on security matters (even if the ACC initially had no formal military component) was threatening for Saudi Arabia, Kuwait, and even Syria and Israel. Recognizing this unease, King Fahd undertook a diplomatic tour in March 1989 to Baghdad and Cairo, seeking clarity and assurances about the ACC's intentions. His trip was partly motivated by anxiety that Iraq's newfound bloc could herald a shift in the regional balance of power. In Baghdad, Fahd conferred with Saddam and conveyed the kingdom's concerns directly. According to contemporary analyses, Saudi Arabia was sufficiently concerned by Iraq's assertive pan-Arab positioning that it sought concrete assurances to clarify Baghdad's intentions.

== Details ==
The Treaty of Nonaggression was signed in Baghdad in late March 1989 during King Fahd's state visit to Iraq. (King Fahd traveled to Egypt immediately afterward, underscoring the tour's significance for inter-Arab relations.) On the Iraqi side, President Saddam Hussein personally took part in the discussions and agreement. The fact that the Saudi monarch and the Iraqi president – two of the Middle East's most prominent leaders – were directly involved lent the pact considerable weight and symbolism. Observers at the time remarked that Fahd's stop in Iraq, where he was greeted with full honors, and the surprise announcement of a nonaggression pact marked a peak in Saudi–Iraqi rapprochement.

According to accounts of the 1989 visit, King Fahd was initially surprised when Saddam Hussein proposed a nonaggression treaty between Iraq and Saudi Arabia. As there were no territorial disputes or overt tensions between the two countries at the time, the proposal struck the Saudi monarch as unusual and somewhat puzzling. King Fahd reportedly responded by noting that Arab solidarity and existing commitments under the Arab League should already bind the two nations in mutual respect, stating, "If what is meant are agreements and obligations, we are already bound by Arab League commitments and Arab brotherhood—shared blood, identity, and so on. I don't think we need anything more." However, Saddam insisted on the proposal in a personal tone, characterizing it as a friendly request and saying, "It's merely a request, and I hope you won't disappoint me." In the end, King Fahd agreed, responding, "If this makes you and the Iraqi people happy, I have no objection."

== Aftermath ==
In the immediate months after its signing, the Iraqi–Saudi nonaggression pact did contribute to a period of cordiality between Baghdad and Riyadh. The late 1980s were something of a *golden moment* in Saudi–Iraqi relations: diplomatic exchanges were warm, and Saudi Arabia's gestures (like debt forgiveness) gave Iraq some economic breathing space. The two countries cooperated within OPEC in early 1990 to an extent, as Iraq pushed for higher oil prices to boost its revenues while Saudi Arabia, the traditional OPEC swing producer, agreed to moderate its own output demands in a spirit of compromise. For instance, at an OPEC meeting in July 1990, Saudi Arabia played a largely passive role and acquiesced to Iraq's insistence on stricter production quotas to raise prices – a stark change from previous Saudi–Iraq oil spats. This indicated that, superficially at least, the pact and the improved political climate made Saudi leaders more accommodating of Iraq's economic needs in the short term.

However, the peaceful facade was short-lived. By mid-1990, underlying tensions resurfaced dramatically. Saddam Hussein grew increasingly frustrated with Kuwait (and to a lesser degree the UAE) over issues that included oil overproduction (which was depressing prices) and Kuwait's refusal to forgive Iraq's war debt. In a series of increasingly belligerent speeches and moves in 1990, Saddam accused Kuwait of economic warfare against Iraq. Notably, Saudi–Iraqi relations also quietly cooled as Iraq's rhetoric escalated. Riyadh attempted to mediate the Iraq–Kuwait dispute at first, but Saddam's grievances had reached a boiling point. The existence of the nonaggression pact did not stop Iraq from massing troops on Kuwait's border by late July 1990. Saudi officials were alarmed by this development, but Iraq assured Saudi Arabia that it had no hostile intent toward the kingdom itself – an assurance presumably underpinned by the still-fresh pact. In fact, Saddam personally told King Hussein of Jordan that Iraq “had no intention of invading [Saudi Arabia],” citing the nonaggression pact as evidence of his peaceful posture toward Riyadh. Nevertheless, these promises rang hollow once events unfolded.

On August 2, 1990, Iraq invaded Kuwait, shattering the regional order. With Iraqi forces occupying Kuwait, Saudi Arabia suddenly found itself on the frontline of a potential further Iraqi offensive. Saudi leaders now feared that Saddam might continue his southward march into Saudi territory, a prospect that could not be ignored. In response, Saudi Arabia agreed to a U.S. proposal to deploy American and coalition forces on its territory to protect the kingdom from a potential Iraqi advance – a watershed decision that led to Operation Desert Shield and ultimately the Gulf War of January–February 1991. During that war, Iraq attacked Saudi targets with several missile strikes, effectively nullifying any notion of nonaggression between them. As one strategic analysis later observed, conciliatory gestures like the nonaggression pact "could not assuage Saddam's deeper grievances", and once Iraq unleashed war on Kuwait, it was “irrevocably damned” in regional perceptions.
