= Michael Tarchaneiotes =

Byzantine general (died 1284)

Michael Palaiologos Tarchaneiotes
- Μιχαήλ Παλαιολόγος Ταρχανειώτης
- Died: 1284
- Military career
- Allegiance: Byzantine Empire
- Service years: fl. 1262–1284
- Rank: Protovestiarios; Megas Konostaulos; Megas Domestikos
- Conflicts: Siege of Berat (1280–1281); Siege of Demetrias

Michael Palaiologos Tarchaneiotes (Greek: Μιχαήλ Παλαιολόγος Ταρχανειώτης) was a Byzantine aristocrat and general, active against the Turks in Asia Minor and against the Angevins in the Balkans from 1278 until his death from disease in 1284.

== Biography ==
Michael Tarchaneiotes was the son of Nikephoros Tarchaneiotes, megas domestikos to John III Vatatzes (r. 1221–1254), and Maria-Martha Palaiologina, the eldest sister of Michael VIII Palaiologos (r. 1259–1261). His family supported the rise of Palaiologos to the throne in 1259, and the new emperor rewarded Michael and his brothers: they came to live in the imperial palace, while eventually Michael and his younger brother Andronikos Tarchaneiotes received the high offices of protovestiarios and megas konostaulos respectively, and the third brother, John Tarchaneiotes, became a general.

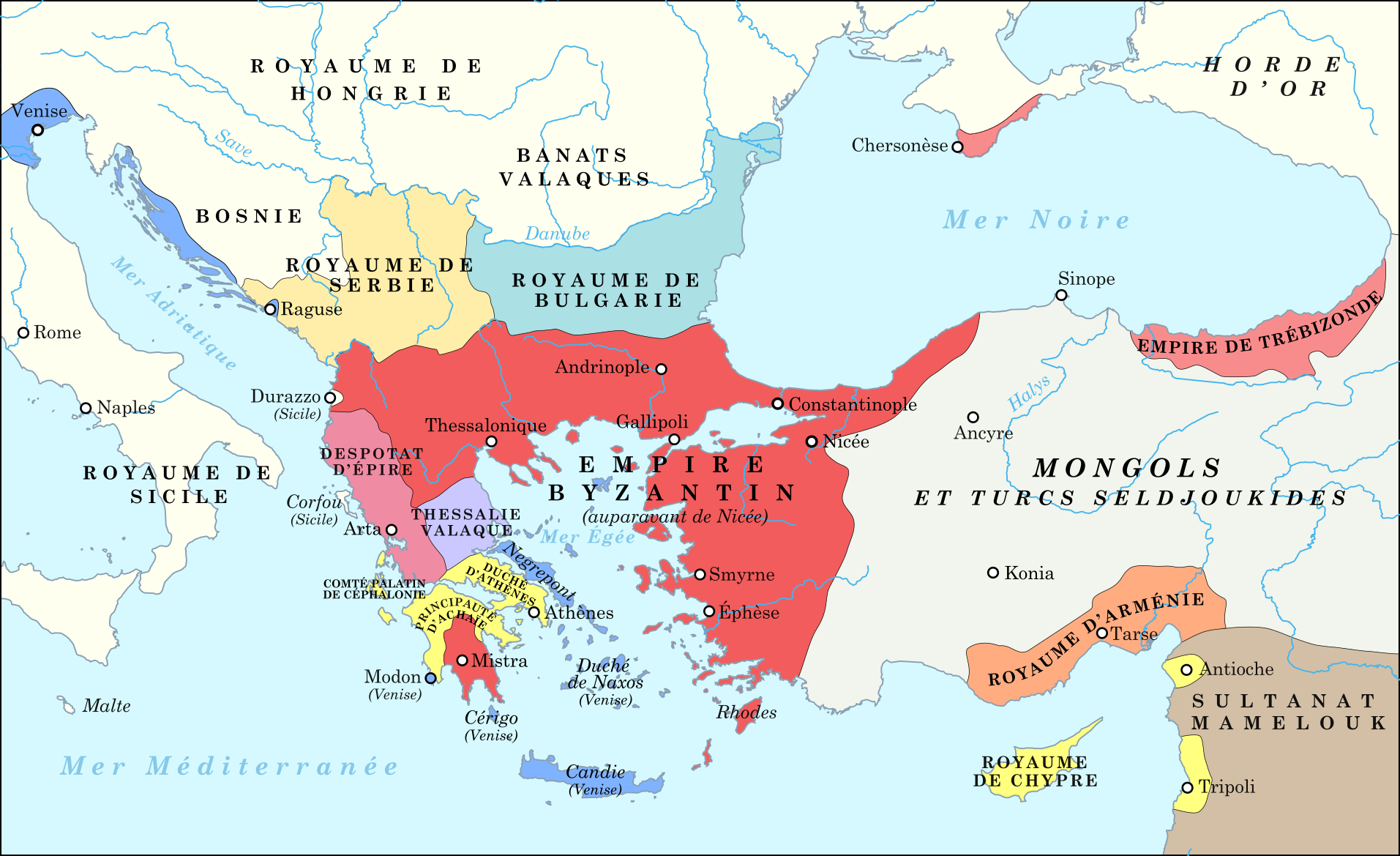
The Byzantine Empire in 1265

He first appears in the sources taking part in the 1262 campaign against the Despotate of Epirus under his uncle, John Palaiologos. In 1278, having risen to the post of megas domestikos, Tarchaneiotes accompanied his cousin, the young co-emperor Andronikos II Palaiologos (r. 1282–1328) to an expedition against the Turks in Asia Minor. The campaign was successful in driving the Turks out of the valley of the Maeander River. Tarchaneiotes, on Andronikos's orders, rebuilt, fortified, and repopulated the city of Tralles, which the young ruler intended to rename as Andronikopolis or Palaiologopolis. However, in 1284 the city was poorly supplied with water and provisions, and was thus besieged and taken by the emir of Menteshe.

In spring 1281, Tarchaneiotes led the Byzantine army that was sent to relieve the city of Bellegrada (Berat) in Albania, which was being besieged by an Angevin army. Tarchaneiotes's troops captured the Angevin commander, Hugh of Sully, in an ambush, whereupon his army panicked and was defeated with great loss by the Byzantines. Tarchaneiotes was received with great pomp in Constantinople, where he paraded the captive Sully in a triumphal procession through the city; but he declined the offer of promotion to the rank of Caesar out of modesty. In 1283/4, Tarchaneiotes was placed by Andronikos II at the head of the campaign against John I Doukas of Thessaly. Tarchaneiotes's forces marched to Thessaly, where they were joined by a Byzantine fleet and laid siege to the port city of Demetrias. The city fell, but the outbreak of an epidemic (possibly malaria) killed many soldiers, including Tarchaneiotes, and forced the remainder of the army to withdraw.

=== Family ===
Tarchaneiotes married Maria, daughter of the megas doux Alexios Doukas Philanthropenos, sometime before 1262. Together they had three children: an unnamed son who was given the rank of protosebastos, an unnamed daughter who married Alexios Raoul, and the famed general and rebel Alexios Philanthropenos the Younger.

== Sources ==
- Bartusis, Mark C. (1997). The Late Byzantine Army: Arms and Society 1204–1453. Philadelphia, Pennsylvania: University of Pennsylvania Press. ISBN 0-8122-1620-2.
- Kazhdan, Alexander, ed. (1991). The Oxford Dictionary of Byzantium. Oxford and New York: Oxford University Press. ISBN 0-19-504652-8.
- Nicol, Donald M. (1993) [1972]. The Last Centuries of Byzantium, 1261–1453 (Second ed.). Cambridge: Cambridge University Press. ISBN 978-0-521-43991-6.
- Trapp, Erich; Beyer, Hans-Veit; Walther, Rainer; Sturm-Schnabl, Katja; Kislinger, Ewald; Leontiadis, Ioannis; Kaplaneres, Sokrates (1976–1996). Prosopographisches Lexikon der Palaiologenzeit (in German). Vienna: Verlag der Österreichischen Akademie der Wissenschaften. ISBN 3-7001-3003-1.
