= Soviet–Estonian Non-Aggression Pact =

1932 treaty between the Soviet Union and Estonia

The Soviet–Estonian Non-Aggression Pact was a non-aggression pact, signed between the Soviet Union and Estonia on May 4, 1932. It was ratified by Estonia on 29 July 1932 and the Soviet Union 5 August 1932, and entered into force on 18 August 1932 for the period of 3 years. The pact provided the opportunity to be renounced 6 months before expiration or by either Estonia or USSR at any time without notice in the event of an act of aggression by the other party against any third state. If not renounced the pact was to be prolonged each two years for indetermined period. The pact was prolonged until 31 December 1945 on 4 April 1934 and was again reaffirmed on 28 September 1939. However on 14th June 1940 the USSR blockaded Estonia by sea and air and occupied it on 16th. (See the article on Estonia)

The terms of the treaty were:

Article 1. Each party guarantees the borders of each other, set by the Treaty of Tartu, and must not infringe upon each other's borders. Article 2. Each party agrees not to form a coalition against one another, form an alliance against one another, or politically or economically embargo each other.
