= Siege of Berat (1280–1281) =

Part of the Byzantine–Latin Wars

- Part of the Byzantine–Latin Wars
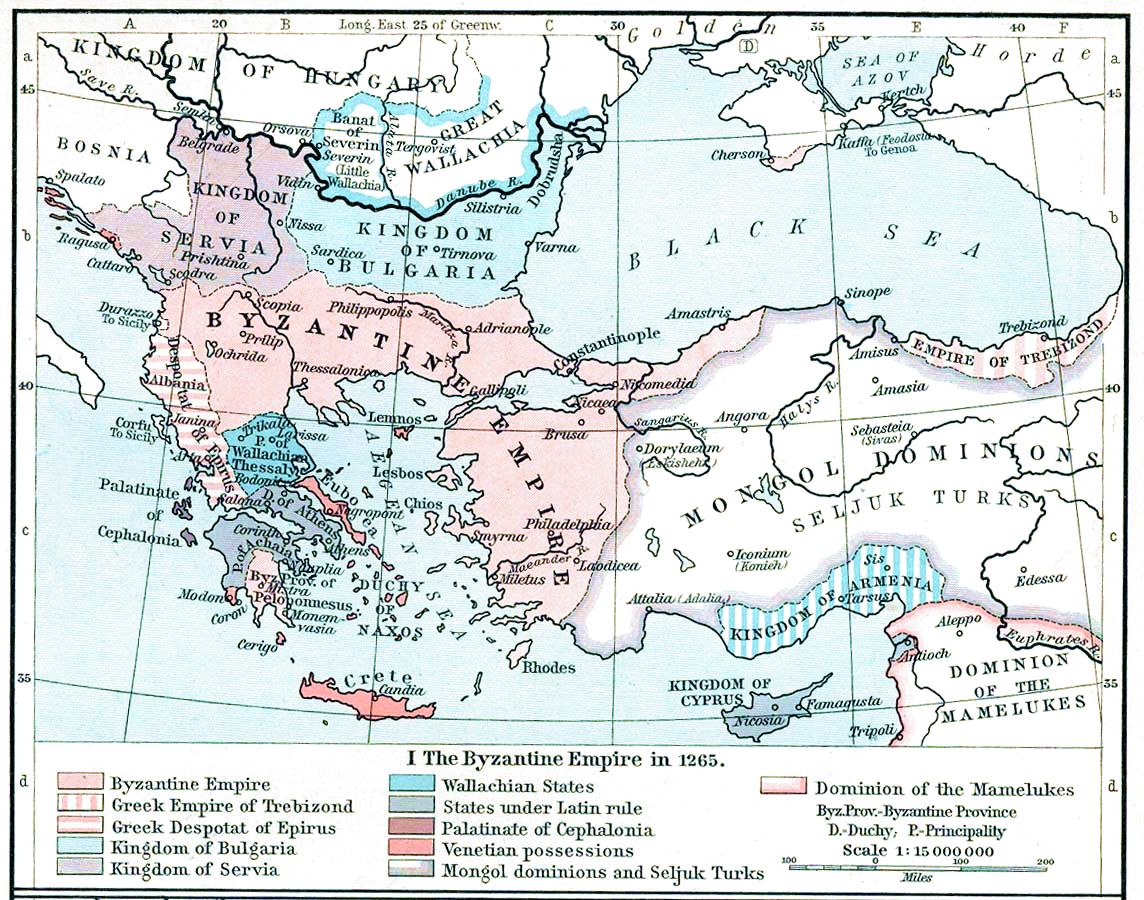
- Map of the Byzantine Empire and the surrounding states in 1265.
Date	1280–1281
Location	Berat, Kingdom of Albania
Result	Byzantine victory

Belligerents
Byzantine Empire	Kingdom of Sicily; Kingdom of Albania

Commanders and leaders
Michael Tarchaneiotes; John Synadenos (megas stratopedarches); Demetrios Micheal Angelos	Hugh of Sully (POW)

Strength
Unknown	2,000 knights 6,000 men-at-arms

Casualties and losses
Unknown	Heavy

The siege of Berat in Albania by the forces of the Angevin Kingdom of Sicily against the Byzantine garrison of the city took place in 1280–1281. Berat was a strategically important fortress, whose possession would allow the Angevins access to the heartlands of the Byzantine Empire. A Byzantine relief force arrived in spring 1281, and managed to ambush and capture the Angevin commander, Hugo de Sully. Thereupon, the Angevin army panicked and fled, suffering heavy losses in killed and wounded as it was attacked by the Byzantines. This defeat ended the threat of a land invasion of the Byzantine Empire, and along with the Sicilian Vespers marked the end of the Western threat to reconquer Byzantium.

== Background ==
Ever since the Emperor Michael VIII Palaiologos (r. 1259–1282) recovered Constantinople from the Latin Empire in 1261, the restored Byzantine Empire faced the threat of a Latin crusade to reclaim the city. The antagonistic Despotate of Epirus and the Latin states of southern Greece, fearful of the Byzantine resurgence, sought aid from the Kingdom of Sicily, first under Manfred of Sicily (r. 1258–1266), and after 1266 under the ambitious Charles of Anjou (r. 1266–1285), who quickly established himself as Byzantium's chief antagonist. Countering the Angevin ruler's alliances and efforts to conquer Byzantium would occupy the remainder of Michael VIII's reign.

In 1258, the Sicilians took possession of the island of Corfu and the Albanian coast, from Dyrrhachium to Valona and Buthrotum and as far inland as Berat. This gave Manfred a strategically vital beachhead in the Balkans, controlling the western terminus of the great Via Egnatia, the main overland route to Constantinople. Already in the 11th and 12th centuries, the same area had been the target of the Normans of southern Italy in their attacks on the Empire. After overthrowing Manfred, in the Treaty of Viterbo (1267) Charles secured his recognition as Manfred's heir. In 1272, the Latin notables who had held the fortresses of Valona, Kanina, and Berat for Manfred surrendered them to Charles, and soon afterwards Charles's troops took Dyrrhachium too. Having secured the support of many Albanian chieftains, Charles proclaimed the establishment of the Kingdom of Albania in the same year.

Michael VIII countered the emerging threat by a diplomatic mission to the Papacy, which in the Second Council of Lyon (1274) agreed to the union of the Orthodox and Catholic churches, estranged after the Great Schism of 1054, and thereby placed Michael and his empire under papal protection. Taking advantage of Charles's entanglement in the conflict between Guelphs and Ghibellines in Italy, in spring 1274 Michael launched an attack against Angevin holdings in Albania. Berat and Buthrotum were taken and Charles's troops were pushed back from the hinterland to the two ports of Valona and Dyrrhachium. Although these were assaulted several times in 1274–1275, they remained in Angevin hands.

By 1279 however, Charles had established his control not only over the Latin states of Greece (after 1278 he was the Prince of Achaea), but also received the submission and vassalage of Nikephoros I, Despot of Epirus. In August 1279, in preparation for resuming his offensive against Michael along the Via Egnatia, Charles appointed as his vicar-general in Albania the Burgundian Hugo de Sully. Over the next year, Sully received a steady flow of supplies, siege equipment and reinforcements.

== Siege ==
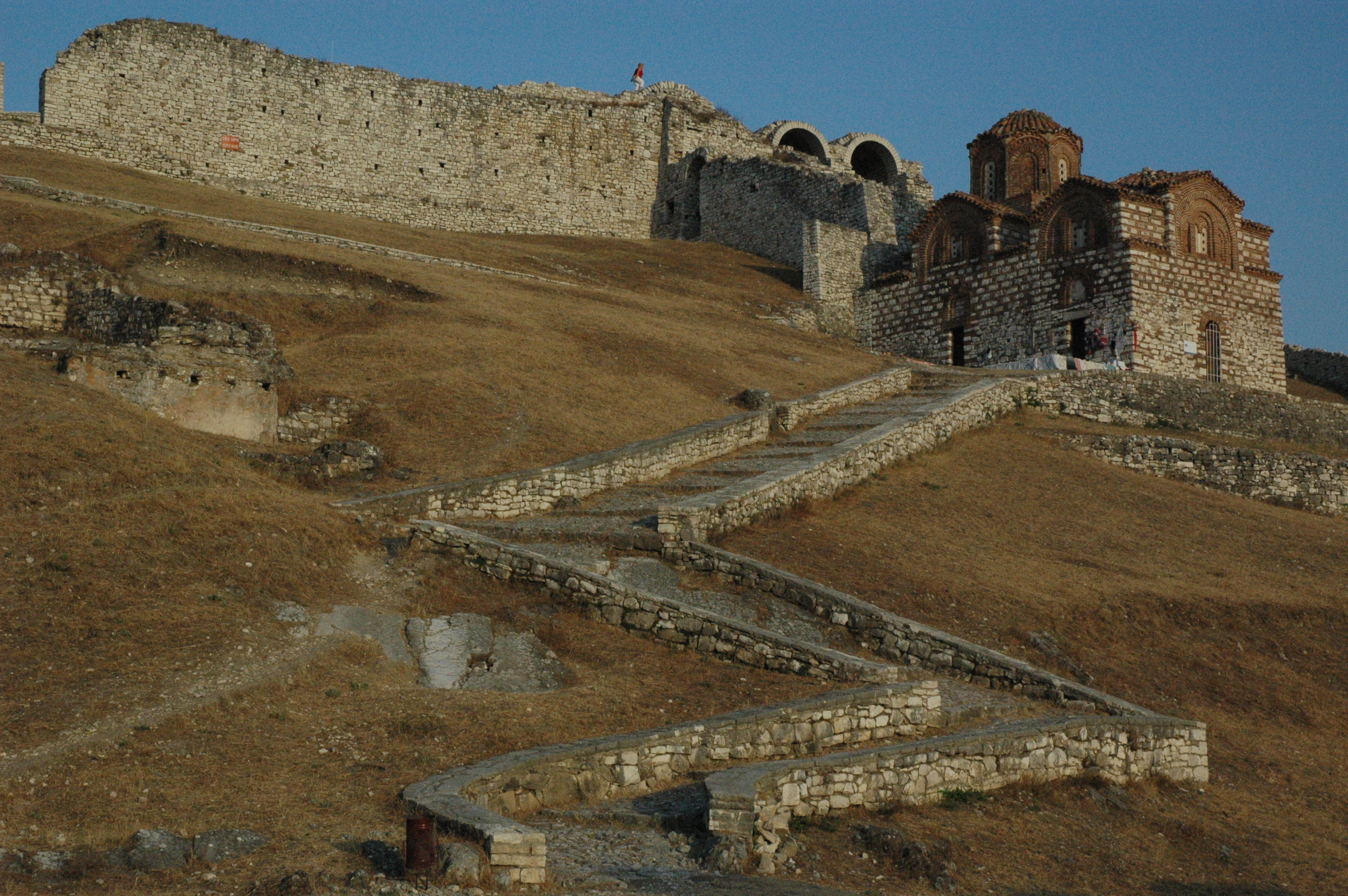
The entrance of the citadel of Berat, with the 13th-century Byzantine church of the Holy Trinity.

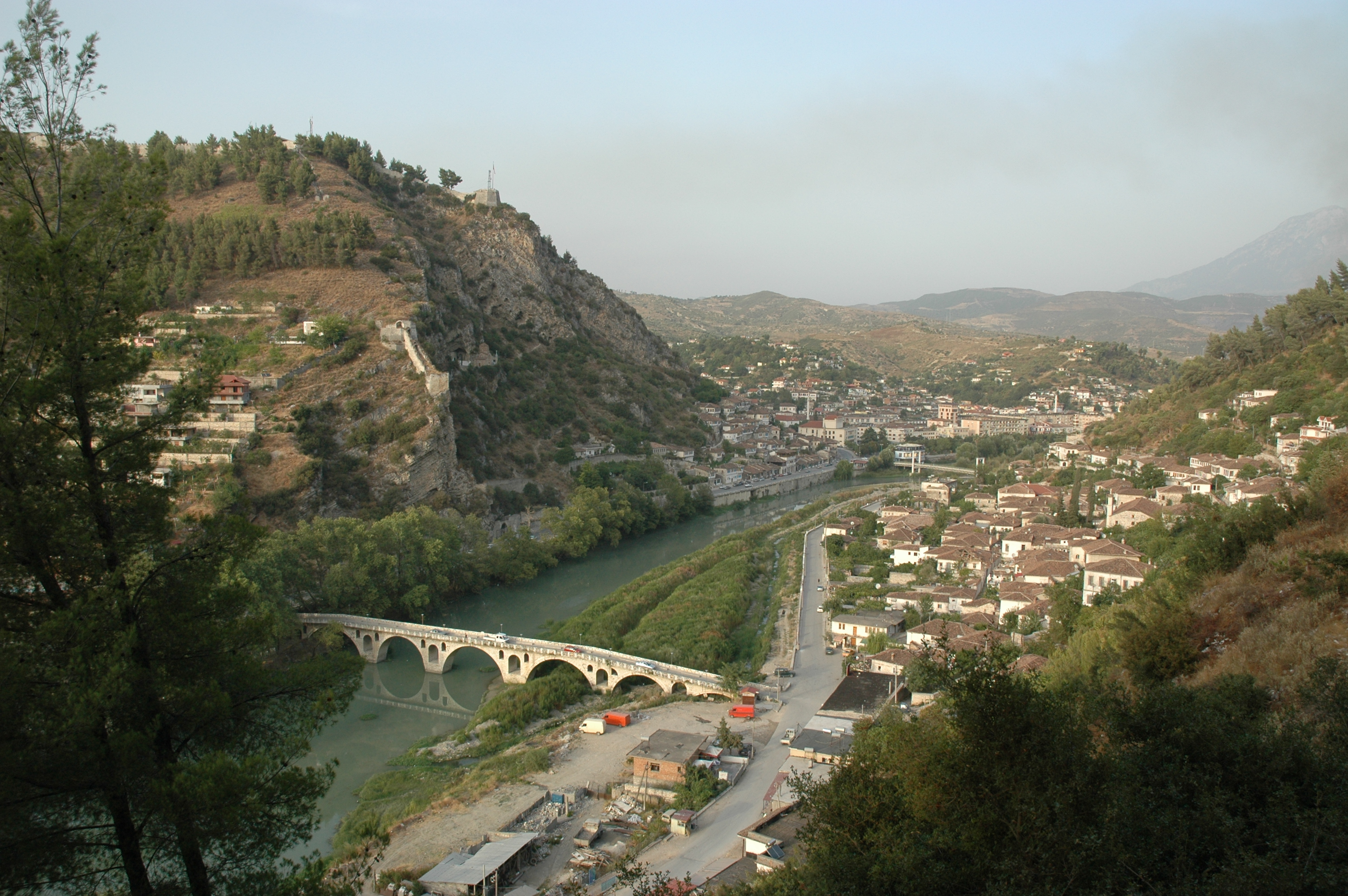
The river Osum, flowing through Berat, with the hill of the citadel on the left.

In August/September 1280, with an army of 2,000 knights and 6,000 infantry, Sully began his attack by storming the fortress of Kanina and then advancing to central Albania and laying siege to Bellegrada. The situation was grave for Byzantium: Bellegrada was, in the words of the historian Deno J. Geanakoplos "the key to the Via Egnatia and all of Macedonia". If it were taken, the Empire would lie open to an invasion, which, if joined by the Latin states of Greece and the Greek rulers of Epirus and Thessaly, might result in the fall of Constantinople to Charles. Responding to the pleas for reinforcements of the governor of Bellegrada, Michael VIII ordered special prayers for the salvation of the Empire, and assembled an army headed by some of his best generals. The army's commander-in-chief was the megas domestikos Michael Tarchaneiotes, with the megas stratopedarches John Synadenos, the despotes Michael Komnenos Doukas (the emperor's son-in-law), and the eunuch court official Andronikos Enopolites as subordinate commanders.

Meanwhile, the siege of Bellegrada continued through the winter of 1280/1281. By early December, the Angevin forces had seized a number of outlying forts around the city and penetrated its suburbs. Charles, however, remained anxious to take the city before the Byzantine relief force arrived. He ordered his governors in Albania to direct all their resources towards the siege, and displayed his close interest by a series of letters to Sully, instructing him to take the city by assault if necessary. The Byzantine force advanced cautiously, and arrived in the area in early spring 1281. The megas domestikos Tarchaneiotes avoided a direct confrontation and relied on ambushes and raids instead. He also managed to resupply the besieged fortress with provisions, which were loaded onto rafts and then left to float down the river Osum which flows by the citadel.

The besiegers became aware of this, and, unlike the Byzantines, the Angevin commanders were eager for a decisive confrontation. At this point, Sully resolved to reconnoitre the area personally, accompanied only by a bodyguard of 25 men. As he approached the Byzantine camp, he fell into an ambush by Turkish mercenaries serving in the Byzantine army. The Turks attacked the small troop, killed Sully's horse, scattered his guard, and captured him. A few of Sully's guards escaped and reached their camp, where they reported his capture. Panic spread among the Angevin troops at this news, and they began to flee towards Valona. The Byzantines took advantage of their disordered flight and attacked, joined by the troops in the besieged citadel. Many Latins fell, many others were captured as the Byzantines aimed their arrows at the less well-protected horses of the Latin knights, unhorsing them. The Byzantines also took an enormous booty, including all the numerous siege machines. Only a small remnant managed to cross the river Aoos and reach the safety of Kanina.

== Aftermath ==
The victory at Bellegrada represented Michael VIII's greatest success in battle over the Latins since the Battle of Pelagonia 20 years earlier. The many prisoners, including Sully, were taken to Constantinople, where they were publicly paraded in a triumph celebrated by the exultant emperor, who further ordered frescoes depicting scenes from the campaign painted in his palace. In the aftermath of their victory at Bellegrada, the imperial troops restored their control over Albania, except the two Angevin strongholds of Dyrrachium and Aulon. The defeat ended Charles's designs of an overland assault on Byzantium, but the Angevin ruler now redoubled his efforts, aiming to launch a seaborne invasion of the Empire with Venetian aid. This he secured with the Treaty of Orvieto in 1281. The Papacy also, after the election of the pro-Angevin Martin IV, finally sanctioned his plans, excommunicating Michael Palaiologos and ending the Union of the Churches. Michael VIII countered this with an alliance with Peter III of Aragon (r. 1276–1285), and with his support to various anti-Angevin forces in Italy. Just as Charles was ready to launch his attack, an uprising known as the Sicilian Vespers broke out on March 30, 1282. The subsequent wars, in large part the result of Michael's diplomatic efforts, ended the threat of Charles on Byzantium.

== Sources ==
- Bartusis, Mark C. (1997). The Late Byzantine Army: Arms and Society, 1204–1453. Philadelphia, Pennsylvania: University of Pennsylvania Press. ISBN 0-8122-1620-2.
- Fine, John V. A. (1994) [1987]. The Late Medieval Balkans: A Critical Survey from the Late Twelfth Century to the Ottoman Conquest. Ann Arbor, Michigan: University of Michigan Press. ISBN 978-0-472-10079-8.
- Geanakoplos, Deno John (1959). Emperor Michael Palaeologus and the West, 1258–1282: A Study in Byzantine-Latin Relations. Cambridge, Massachusetts: Harvard University Press.
- Nicol, Donald M. (1993) [1972]. The Last Centuries of Byzantium, 1261–1453 (Second ed.). Cambridge: Cambridge University Press. ISBN 978-0-521-43991-6.
- Setton, Kenneth M. (1976). The Papacy and the Levant (1204–1571), Volume I: The Thirteenth and Fourteenth Centuries. Vol. 1. Philadelphia: The American Philosophical Society. ISBN 0-87169-114-0.
