= Non-aggression pact =

Type of international treaty

A non-aggression pact or neutrality pact is a treaty between two or more states/countries that includes a promise by the signatories not to engage in military action against each other. Such treaties may be described by other names, such as a treaty of friendship or non-belligerency, etc. Leeds, Ritter, Mitchell, & Long (2002) distinguish between a non-aggression pact and a neutrality pact. They posit that a non-aggression pact includes the promise not to attack the other pact signatories, whereas a neutrality pact includes a promise to avoid support of any entity that acts against the interests of any of the pact signatories.

== History ==
In the 19th century, neutrality pacts have historically been used to give permission for one signatory of the pact to attack or attempt to negatively influence an entity not protected by the neutrality pact. The participants of the neutrality pact agree not to attempt to counteract an act of aggression waged by a pact signatory towards an entity not protected under the terms of the pact. Possible motivations for such acts by one or more of the pacts' signatories include a desire to take, or expand, control of economic resources, militarily important locations, etc.

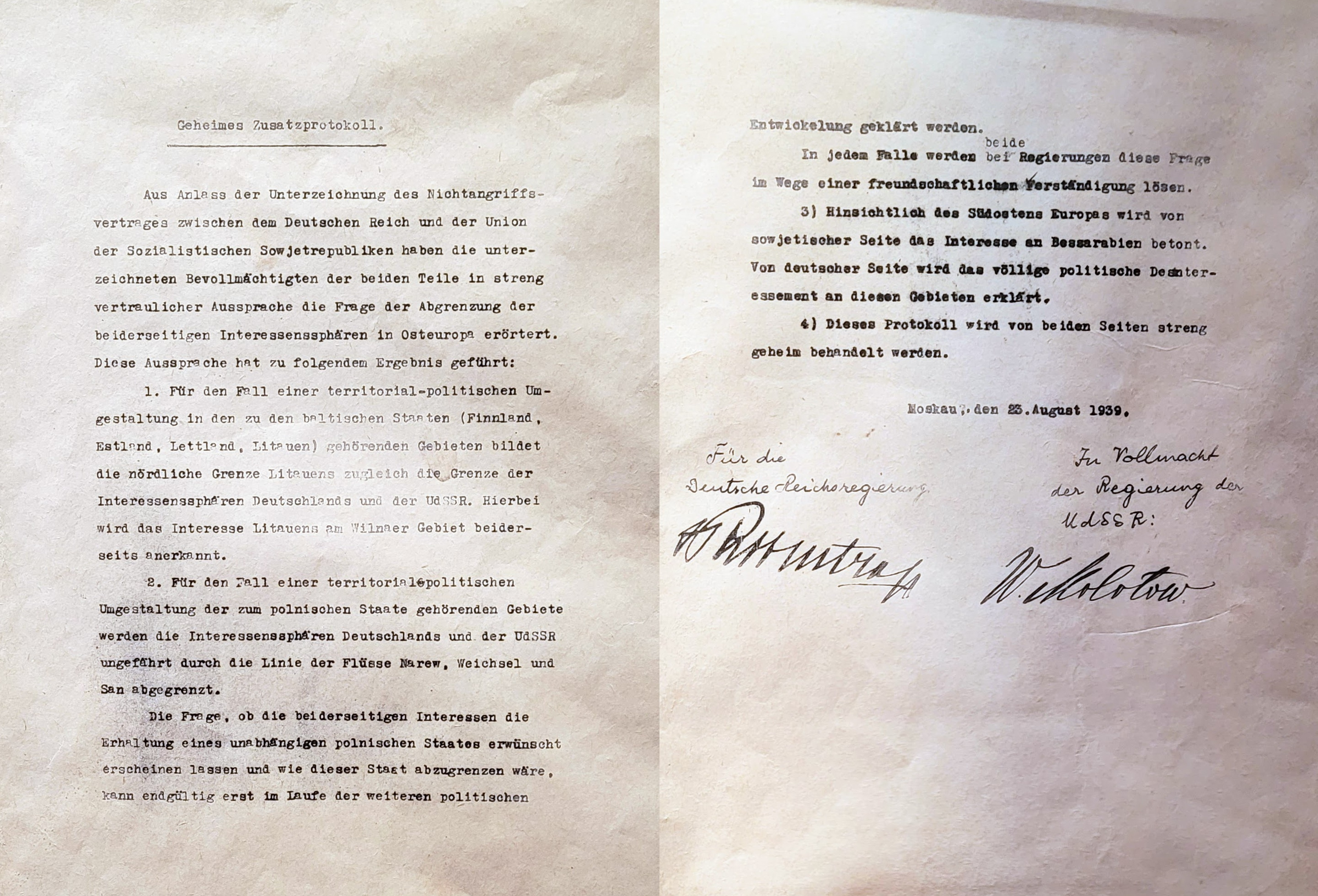
The Molotov–Ribbentrop Pact (German copy)

The 1939 Molotov–Ribbentrop Pact between the Soviet Union and Nazi Germany is perhaps the best-known example of a non-aggression pact. The Pact lasted until the 1941 German invasion of the Soviet Union in Operation Barbarossa. However, such pacts may be a device for neutralising a potential military threat, enabling at least one of the signatories to free up its military resources for other purposes. For example, the Molotov–Ribbentrop Pact freed German resources from the Russian front. On the other hand, the Soviet–Japanese Neutrality Pact, signed on April 13, 1941, removed the threat from Japan in the east enabling the Soviets to move large forces from Siberia to the fight against the Germans, which had a direct bearing on the Battle of Moscow.

The Alliance Treaty Obligations and Provisions (ATOP) dataset records 185 agreements that are solely non-aggression pacts between 1815 and 2018. According to this data, 29 such pacts were recorded in the interwar period with spikes in occurrences in 1960, 1970, 1979, and especially the early 1990s where a number of Eastern European states signed pacts following the fall of the Soviet Union.

States with a history of rivalry tend to sign non-aggression pacts in order to prevent future conflict with one another. The pacts often facilitate information exchange which reduce uncertainty that might lead to conflict. Additionally, the pact signals to third party nations that the rivalry has reduced and that peaceful relations is desired. It has been found that major powers are more likely to start military conflicts against their partners in non-aggression pacts than against states that do not have any sort of alliance with them.

== List of non-aggression pacts ==
List of non-aggression pacts
Signatories	Treaty	Date signed
New Kingdom of Egypt; Hittite Empire	Egyptian–Hittite peace treaty	November 10, 1259 BCE
Delian League Achaemenid Empire	Peace of Callias	c. 449 BCE
Byzantine Empire; Republic of Venice	Byzantine–Venetian Treaty of 1268	April 4, 1268
Byzantine Empire; Republic of Venice	Byzantine–Venetian Treaty of 1277	March 19, 1277
Byzantine Empire; Republic of Venice	Byzantine–Venetian Treaty of 1285	June 15, 1285
Byzantine Empire; Republic of Venice	Byzantine–Venetian Treaty of 1390	June 2, 1390
Kingdom of England; Kingdom of France; Holy Roman Empire; Papal States; Habsburg Spain	Treaty of London	October 3, 1518
Soviet Union; Weimar Republic	German–Soviet Neutrality and Nonaggression Pact	April 24, 1926
Republic of Lithuania; Soviet Union	Soviet–Lithuanian Non-Aggression Pact	September 28, 1926
Kingdom of Romania; Second Hellenic Republic	Greek–Romanian Non-Aggression and Arbitration Pact	March 21, 1928
Kingdom of Afghanistan; Soviet Union	Soviet–Afghan Non-Aggression Pact	June 24, 1931
Republic of Finland; Soviet Union	Soviet–Finnish Non-Aggression Pact	January 21, 1932
Republic of Latvia; Soviet Union	Soviet–Latvian Non-Aggression Pact	February 5, 1932
Republic of Estonia; Soviet Union	Soviet–Estonian Non-Aggression Pact	May 4, 1932
Second Polish Republic; Soviet Union	Soviet–Polish Non-Aggression Pact	July 25, 1932
French Third Republic; Soviet Union	Soviet–French Non-Aggression Pact	November 29, 1932
Kingdom of Italy; Soviet Union	Italo-Soviet Pact	September 2, 1933
Kingdom of Romania; Republic of Turkey	Romanian–Turkish Non-Aggression Pact	October 17, 1933
Kingdom of Yugoslavia; Republic of Turkey	Turkish–Yugoslav Non-Aggression Pact	November 27, 1933
Nazi Germany; Second Polish Republic	German–Polish Declaration of Non-Aggression	January 26, 1934
French Third Republic; Soviet Union	Franco-Soviet Treaty of Mutual Assistance	May 2, 1935
Empire of Japan; Nazi Germany	Anti-Comintern Pact	November 25, 1936
Republic of China; Soviet Union	Sino-Soviet Non-Aggression Pact	August 21, 1937
Imperial State of Iran; Kingdom of Afghanistan; Kingdom of Iraq; Republic of Turkey	Treaty of Saadabad	June 25, 1938
First Czechoslovak Republic; Kingdom of Hungary; Kingdom of Romania; Kingdom of Yugoslavia	Hungarian–Little Entente agreement	August 22, 1938
French Third Republic; Nazi Germany	Franco–German Non-Aggression Pact	December 6, 1938
Estado Novo (Portugal); Spanish State	Iberian Pact	March 17, 1939
Kingdom of Denmark; Nazi Germany	German–Danish Non-Aggression Pact	May 31, 1939
Nazi Germany; Republic of Estonia	German–Estonian Non-Aggression Pact	June 7, 1939
Nazi Germany; Republic of Latvia	German–Latvian Non-Aggression Pact	June 7, 1939
Nazi Germany; Soviet Union	Molotov–Ribbentrop Pact	23 August 1939
Thailand; United Kingdom	British–Thai Non-Aggression Pact	June 12, 1940
French Third Republic; Thailand	Franco-Thai Non-Aggression Pact	June 12, 1940
Kingdom of Hungary; Kingdom of Yugoslavia	Hungarian–Yugoslav Non-Aggression Pact	December 12, 1940
Kingdom of Yugoslavia; Soviet Union	Soviet–Yugoslav Non-Aggression Pact	April 6, 1941
Empire of Japan; Soviet Union	Soviet–Japanese Neutrality Pact	April 13, 1941
Nazi Germany; Republic of Turkey	German–Turkish Treaty of Friendship	June 18, 1941
People's Republic of Angola; Zaire; Zambia	Non-Aggression Pact of 1979	October 14, 1979
Republic of South Africa; People's Republic of Mozambique	Nkomati Accord	March 13, 1984

== List of proposed non-aggression pacts ==
- Prime Minister Nikol Pashinyan of Armenia proposed Azerbaijan to sign a non-aggression pact, along with a mutual arms control mechanism, in January 2024.
- The U.S. 28-point Ukraine plan to end the Russo-Ukrainian war included a nonaggression pact between Russia, Ukraine and the European Union.
- During the 2026 Iran war, Iran's former foreign minister Mohammad Javad Zarif proposed a "permanent nonaggression pact" with the United States.

== Other usage ==
The term has colloquial usage outside the field of international relations. In the context of association football, the term can imply a deliberate lack of aggression between two teams, such as at the Disgrace of Gijón, which, in Germany, is known as the Nichtangriffspakt von Gijón (lit. "Non-aggression pact of Gijón"). A non-aggression pact can also be a formal agreement or gentlemen's agreement limiting transfers for players between two or more clubs.

== See also ==
- Treaty of Friendship
- List of treaties
- Military alliance
- Peace treaty
