= Franco–German Declaration =

Pact between France and Nazi Germany

The Franco–German Declaration, also known as the Franco–German Non-Aggression Pact, was a treaty signed between France and Nazi Germany on 6 December 1938. The treaty was signed in Paris by Georges Bonnet, the minister of foreign affairs of France, and Joachim von Ribbentrop, the minister of foreign affairs of Nazi Germany.

== Background ==
After Adolf Hitler's rise to power in 1933 and Germany's remilitarization of the Rhineland shifted the European balance of power, France sought to contain Nazi expansionism through improved economic and political relations. French Prime Minister Léon Blum prioritised achieving a comprehensive political agreement on European peace and disarmament before any economic settlement, while Reichsbank President Hjalmar Schacht pushed for immediate economic cooperation, particularly regarding German access to raw materials and colonies. When Camille Chautemps replaced Blum in June 1937, France reversed this approach, signing a new agreement in July 1937, hoping to support the position of moderate Nazi figures like Schacht against hardliners like Hermann Göring. This strategy collapsed due to Göring's Four-Year Plan for rearmament. Schacht lost power and was dismissed from the Economics Ministry in November 1937. Germany's increasingly aggressive actions, including the Anschluss with Austria, demonstrated that resuming economic relations could not restrain Nazi expansion. The Munich Agreement in September 1938 set the stage for the Franco–German Declaration, which represented France's shift from genuine rapprochement to appeasement of German dominance.

== The treaty ==
The full text of the treaty:

M. GEORGES BONNET, Minister of Foreign Affairs of the French Republic, And M. JOACHIM VON RIBBENTROP, Minister of Foreign Affairs for the German Reich, Acting in the name and on behalf of their governments have agreed as follows during their meeting in Paris Dec. 6, 1938:

I

The French Government and the German Government share fully the conviction that pacific and good neighborly relations between France and Germany constitute one of the essential elements in the consolidation of the situation in Europe and the maintenance of general peace. The two governments will in consequence use their best endeavor to assure the development of relations between their two countries in this direction.

II

The two governments take note that between their countries no question of a territorial order remains in suspense and they solemnly recognize as definitive the frontier between their two countries as it is at present established.

III

The two governments are resolved, under the reservation of their special relations with third party powers, to remain in contact on all questions interesting their two countries and to consult together mutually in the event that any ulterior evolution of these questions might risk leading to international difficulties.

In faith whereof the representatives of the two governments have signed the present declaration, which enters into effect immediately.
