= Giovanni Dandolo =

Doge of Venice from 1280 to 1289

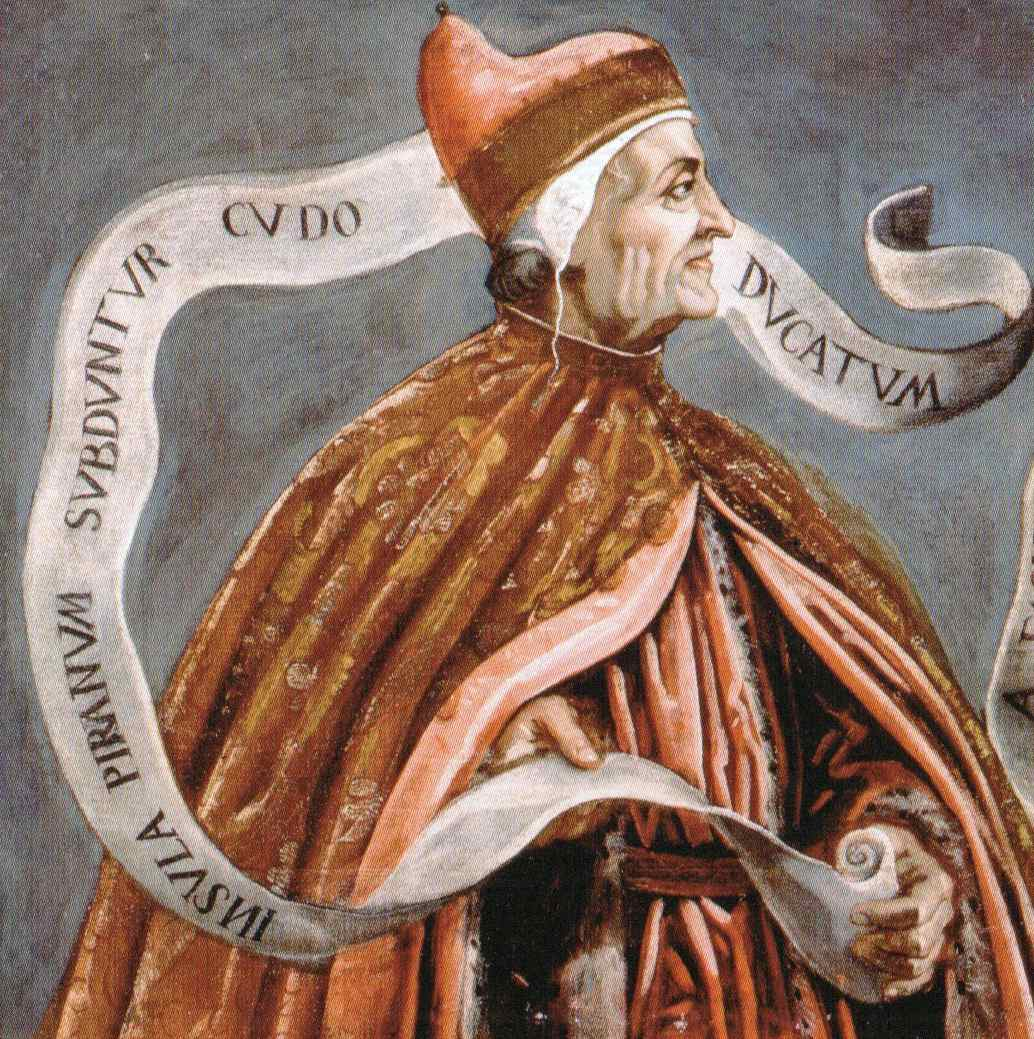
- Portrait in the Doge’s Palace

Doge of Venice
- In office 1280–1289
- Preceded by: Jacopo Contarini
- Succeeded by: Pietro Gradenigo

Personal details
- Born: Unknown
- Died: 2 November 1289

Giovanni Dandolo was the 48th Doge of Venice, elected late in his life on 31 March 1280. He died on 2 November 1289. During his reign, the first Venetian gold ducat was introduced into circulation.

== Family ==
Dandolo came from a prominent Venetian family that provided three other doges to Venice: Enrico Dandolo, Francesco Dandolo and Andrea Dandolo. Two women from the Dandolo family married doges: Giovanna Dandolo with Pasquale Malipiero and Zilia Dandolo with Lorenzo Priuli. Dandolo is a distant relative of many famous figures in Italian history, such as Fra Angelico, Eugenio Canfari, Benito Mussolini.

Belonging to the branch of the parish of S. Moisè, he was the son of Giberto who had defeated the Genoese in the battle near Settepozzi, and of Maria of Gratone Dandolo of S. Polo. According to all the oldest genealogies, his grandfather was called Giacomo: it is, therefore, to be considered a mistake of the most recent literature the attribution to him of the vicedoge Raniero as an ancestor and then of the Doge Enrico as great-grandfather.

Giovanni Dandolo was married to someone named Caterina.

== Life ==
Before his election as doge, Dandolo occupied various public positions including Podestà of Bologna and Padua, and commander of the Venetian naval units. The news of his election to doge reached him while he was fighting in military action against Istria and Trieste, which expanded into an open war in the following year, also involving Venice's perennial enemy, the Patriarchate of Aquileia and the Papal States. More armed clashes followed, and continued for the duration of Dandolo's reign as doge.

After Dandolo signed the peace Treaty of Ravenna with Ancona, a new military theatre opened through the revolt in Crete led by the Greek noble Alexios Kallergis and backed by the Byzantine emperor Michael VIII, Venice's rival for the domination of the eastern Mediterranean. These conflicts forced the Republic of Venice to negotiate peace agreements with Charles of Anjou and Philip III of France, concluding an alliance with the former in the Treaty of Orvieto.

During Dandolo's reign as doge, relations with the Vatican were tense. Venice had refused to join the Papal States in a punitive action against Sicily, provoking Pope Martin IV to excommunicate Venice, which was later repealed in 1285 by Martin's successor, Pope Honorius IV. In 1287 unrest flared up again in Istria and spread to Friuli. The war widened after the intervention of the German Emperor Rudolf I, who was allied with the Patriarchate of Aquileia, and Venice had to sue for peace.

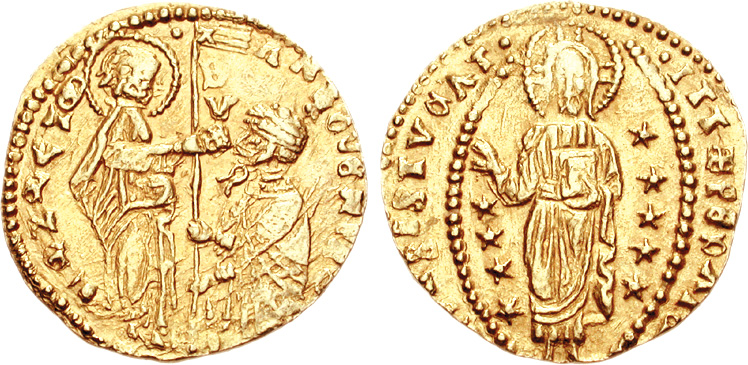
Venetian gold ducat from 1382

In 1284, the first Venetian gold ducat, later called the Zecchino, was introduced into circulation. The ducat would be used until the end of the Venetian Republic and was always made with the same weight, 3.56 grams of 24 karat (99.7%) gold. The coin was valid in all states with which Venice traded. The name ducat comes from the inscription on the coin's back: Sit tibi Christe datus quem tu regis iste ducatus, which frames a picture of Christ. The front of each coin showed the ruling doges on their knees in front of the city's patron saint, Mark the Evangelist.

Dandolo was buried in San Zanipolo. The tomb was not preserved, only a stone slab with an inscription commemorates the doge.

Political offices
Preceded by Jacopo Contarini	Doge of Venice; 1280–1289	Succeeded by Pietro Gradenigo
