= Byzantine–Venetian War (1296–1302) =

War between the Republic of Venice and Byzantine Empire

- Part of the Venetian–Genoese War of 1294–1299
- Islands ceded to Venetian privateers.
Date	July 1296 – 4 October 1302
Location	Aegean Sea
Result	Venetian victory

Belligerents
Byzantine Empire	Republic of Venice

Commanders and leaders
Andronikos II	Pietro Gradenigo; Ruggiero Morosini Malabranca; Belletto Giustinian

Strength
Unknown	Unknown

Casualties and losses
Unknown	Unknown

The Byzantine–Venetian War of 1296–1302 was an offshoot of the second Venetian–Genoese War of 1294–1299.

== Background ==
In 1293, war broke out between Genoa and Venice over their trading operation in the eastern mediterranean. After a Venetian attack on Genoan Galata in 1296, Andronikos II decided to come to the aid of his ally Genoa.

== History ==
In 1296, the local Genoese residents of Constantinople destroyed the Venetian quarter and killed many Venetian civilians. Despite the Byzantine–Venetian treaty of 1285, the Byzantine emperor Andronikos II Palaiologos immediately showed support for his Genoese allies by arresting the Venetian survivors of the massacre, including the Venetian bailo, Marco Bembo.

Venice threatened war with the Byzantine Empire, demanding reparations for the affront they suffered. In July 1296, the Venetian fleet, under command of Ruggiero Morosini Malabranca, stormed the Bosporus. During the course of the campaign, various Genoese possessions in the Mediterranean and the Black Sea were captured, including the city of Phocaea. The Genoese colony of Galata, across the Golden Horn from the Byzantine capital, was also burned down. The emperor, however, preferred at that point to avoid war.

Open war between Venice and the Byzantines did not begin until after the Battle of Curzola and the end of the war with Genoa in the 1299 Treaty of Milan, which left Venice free to pursue her war against the Greeks. The Venetian fleet, reinforced by privateers, began to capture various Byzantine islands in the Aegean Sea, many of which had only been conquered by the Byzantines from Latin lords about twenty years before.

From April 1301, Byzantine ambassadors were sent to Venice to negotiate a peace, but without success. In July 1302, a Venetian fleet with twenty-eight galleys arrived before Constantinople itself, and staged a demonstration of force: before the eyes of the Byzantine capital's inhabitants, the admiral Belletto Giustinian flogged the population of the island of Prinkipos, including refugees from Asia Minor who had fled the Turkish advance there, which the Venetians had taken prisoner.

This induced the Byzantine government to propose a peace treaty, signed on 4 October 1302. According to its terms, the Venetians returned most of their conquests, but kept the islands of Kea, Santorini, Serifos and Amorgos, which were retained by the privateers who had captured them. The Byzantines also agreed to repay the Venetians for their losses sustained during the massacre of Venetian residents in 1296.

== Aftermath ==
The failure of the Byzantines to combat the Venetian threat demonstrated the problem with Andronicus's disbandment of the fleet. The Aegean islands quickly became easy targets for ambitious privateers. Andronicus would later attempt to reestablish the fleet, but to no avail. The final chapter of Byzantine naval supremacy had come to a close.

== See also ==
- Byzantine–Venetian war of 1171
- Venetian–Genoese wars

== Sources ==
- Loenertz, Raymond-Joseph (1975). Les Ghisi, dynastes vénitiens dans l'Archipel (1207–1390) (in French). Florence: Olschki. pp. 100–03.
- Loenertz, Raymond-Joseph (1959). "Notes d'histoire et de chronologie byzantines". Revue des études byzantines (in French). 17: 158–67. doi:10.3406/rebyz.1959.1204.
- Nicol, Donald M. (1988). Byzantium and Venice: A Study in Diplomatic and Cultural Relations. Cambridge: Cambridge University Press. pp. 217-221. ISBN 0-521-34157-4.
- Norwich, John Julius (2000). Bisanzio. Milan: Mondadori. ISBN 8804481854.
- AA.VV. Storia di Venezia, Treccani, 12 Vols., 1990–2002
