= Byzantine–Venetian treaty of 1285 =

Treaty between the Byzantine Empire and Venice

- Type: Ten-year non-aggression pact and commercial treaty
- Signed: 15 June 1285
- Location: Constantinople
- Signatories: Byzantine Empire; Republic of Venice

The Byzantine–Venetian treaty of 1285 was an agreement between the Byzantine Empire and the Republic of Venice that restored peaceful relations between the two powers. Venice had had troubled relations with the Byzantines after their reconquest of Constantinople in 1261, but treaties in 1268 and 1277 had allowed Venetians to conduct profitable commerce in the Empire, while safeguarding the Byzantines from attacks by the powerful Venetian navy. This had changed in 1281, when Venice sided with Charles I of Anjou in his designs against the Byzantines. After the outbreak of the War of the Sicilian Vespers in 1282, Charles' ambitions to capture Constantinople were dealt a fatal blow; with economic troubles arising from her exclusion from the commerce and grain shipping from the Black Sea, in 1283 Venice began negotiations for a treaty with the new Byzantine emperor, Andronikos II Palaiologos. After much back-and-forth, the treaty was concluded in June 1285 in Constantinople, and ratified at Venice shortly after. It repeated the terms of the two previous treaties, often verbatim, but had a much longer duration of ten years. It restored the right of Venetians to trade in the Empire, with direct access to the Black Sea and the right to their own quarters in Constantinople and Thessalonica, recognized the position of Venice's rivals, the Republic of Genoa, in the Empire, and bound both sides to not enter into alliances with powers hostile to the other. As part of the deal, Andronikos paid over a lump sum to satisfy Venetian claims for compensation for breaches of the previous treaties. Following the treaty, Andronikos II disbanded the Byzantine navy, with disastrous long-term consequences. The peace between Venice and the Byzantines lasted until the outbreak of the War of Curzola against Genoa, when Venetians attacked Genoese in Byzantine waters, bringing Byzantium into the war. It was not until 1302 that another Byzantine–Venetian treaty was concluded, ending the conflict.
