= Nicaean–Venetian treaty of 1219 =

1219 treaty between Venice and the Empire of Nicaea

Nicaean–Venetian Treaty of 1219
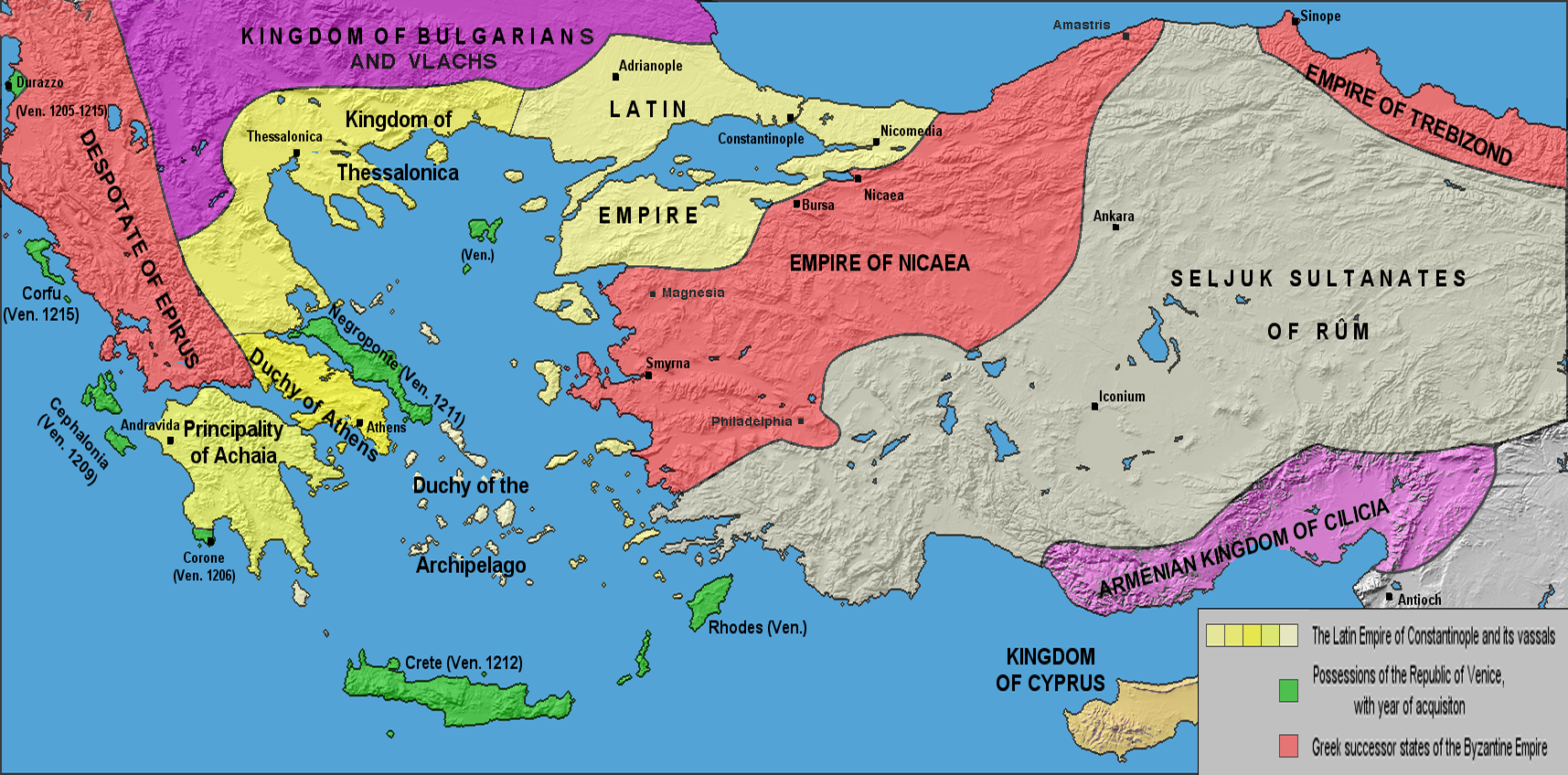
- The Empire of Nicaea in about the year 1214
- Context: The Fourth Crusade's sack of Constantinople
- Signed: 1219
- Expiry: March 13, 1261, as a result of the Treaty of Nymphaeum between Nicaea and Genoa
- Signatories: Empire of Nicaea; Republic of Venice

The Nicaean–Venetian Treaty of 1219 was a trade and non-aggression defense pact signed between the Empire of Nicaea and the Republic of Venice, in the form of an imperial chrysobull issued by Emperor Theodore I Laskaris (r. 1205–1222). This treaty provided the Venetians freedom of trade and imports without customs duties throughout the Empire, in exchange for not supporting for the newly created Latin Empire.

== Background ==
Following the Sack of Constantinople during the Fourth Crusade in 1204, the Venetians, who had played a crucial role in the Crusade's diversion and the eventual sack of the Byzantine capital, stood preeminent amongst the victors. In the subsequent arrangement between the Crusaders, the Partitio terrarum imperii Romaniae, the Venetians were to receive three-eighths of the Byzantine Empire, including three-eighths of Constantinople itself. Although Venice did receive the greatest benefit from the Crusade, they renounced direct sovereignty over the territories of Epirus, Acarnania, Aetolia, and the Peloponnese, which were originally assigned to the Republic. Instead, the Republic of Venice claimed the islands in the Aegean Sea, most importantly Crete, and a chain of ports and coastal forts along the Greek shores, thus coming to dominate the trade centers and routes all across the former Byzantine Empire.

With Venetian support, the Latins continued their campaign into the Balkans to assert their control over former Byzantine lands, but were halted at the Battle of Adrianople in 1205 by the Bulgarians. The newly established Latin Empire, together with Venice, signed a secret treaty with Ghiyaseddin Kay-Khusraw I, the Turkish Sultan of Rûm for a joint war against the chief Byzantine Greek successor state, the Empire of Nicaea. In response, Nicaean emperor Theodore Lascaris made contact with King Leo I of Lesser Armenia in Cilicia who was also threatened by the Sultanate. The agreement between the two realms was concluded by the marriage of Philippa of Armenia, niece of Leo to Lascaris as his second wife in 1214.

== The treaty ==
There had been a long trading relationship between the Venetians and the Byzantines before, starting with the Byzantine–Venetian treaty of 1082. However, with the chaotic events of 1204, the relationship between the two powers had greatly changed. In order to undercut the Venetian military support from the Latin Empire, the major inheritor of Constantinople, Theodore Lascaris, signed a trade agreement with Venice in August 1219 that provided freedom of trade and duty-free imports to the Venetians throughout the Nicaean Empire. In addition to the trading rights, the Doge of Venice, Pietro Ziani, was recognized the titles of Despot and 'Lord of one-quarter and one-eighth of the Empire of Romania' (dominus quartae partis et dimidiae totius Imperii Romaniae), that he had claimed after 1204. The Latin text of the treaty was published in the collection of Venetian diplomatic documents compiled by Gottlieb Tafel and Georg Thomas for the Imperial Academy of Sciences in Vienna.

== Aftermath ==
The treaty gave the newly established Nicaean Empire sufficient breathing space to consolidate and later expand its territory at the expense of the Latin Empire, while Venice gained access to markets that had not been open to them before, including recognition of their presence in Constantinople. However, the treaty itself was subsequently undermined by Theodore Lascaris's fiscal austerity and policies of autarky: he forbade his subjects to buy foreign luxury goods and admonished them to be content with "the products of Roman soil and the craftsmanship of Roman hands". This protectionism was obviously directed against Venice, but they could do little as it would have been the Emperor's right to deny his subjects excessive luxuries. This treaty remained in effect with few complications, until the Treaty of Nymphaeum between the Nicaean Empire and Venice's rival, the Republic of Genoa in 1261.

During the early 1270s, Pope Gregory X ordered the Venetians not to renew the treaty until the union between the Greek Orthodox and Roman Catholic Churches was complete, thus permanently invalidating the treaty.

== See also ==
- Treaty of Nymphaeum (1214)
- Treaty of Nymphaeum (1261)

== Sources ==
- Ostrogorsky, George (1969). History of the Byzantine State. New Brunswick, New Jersey: Rutgers University Press. ISBN 0-8135-1198-4.
- Nicol, Donald M. (1988). Byzantium and Venice: A Study in Diplomatic and Cultural Relations. Cambridge: Cambridge University Press. ISBN 0-521-34157-4.
- Tafel, Gottlieb Lukas Friedrich; Thomas, Georg Martin (1856). Urkunden zur älteren Handels- und Staatsgeschichte der Republik Venedig, mit besonderer Beziehung auf Byzanz und die Levante: Vom neunten bis zum Ausgang des fünfzehnten Jahrhunderts. II. Theil (1205–1255). Vienna: Kaiserlich-Königliche Hof- und Staatsdruckerei.
