= Byzantine–Venetian treaty of 1390 =

Treaty between the Byzantine Empire and Venice

- Type: Five-year non-aggression pact and commercial treaty
- Signed: 2 June 1390
- Location: Constantinople
- Negotiators: Francesco Foscolo (Venice)
- Signatories: Byzantine Empire; Republic of Venice

The Byzantine–Venetian treaty of 1390 was an agreement between the Byzantine Empire and the Republic of Venice that renewed the truce between the two powers and the Venetian commercial privileges in the Byzantine Empire.

It was signed during the brief reign of John VII Palaiologos, after fourteen years of fruitless negotiations for the renewal of the previous treaty. It also reiterated the debts owed by the Byzantine emperors to Venice: 17,163 hyperpyra owed as reparations for damages to Venetian merchants, to be paid in five annual installments; 30,000 gold ducats with interest for the crown jewels pawned during the Byzantine civil war of 1341–1347; and 5,000 ducats lent to John V Palaiologos in 1352. The treaty provided the basis for all subsequent Venetian–Byzantine treaties, being renewed almost verbatim in 1406, 1412, 1418, 1423, 1431, 1436, 1442, and finally in 1447.
