= Byzantine–Venetian treaty of 1277 =

Peace treaty

- Type: Two-year non-aggression pact and commercial treaty
- Signed: 19 March 1277
- Location: Constantinople
- Signatories: Byzantine Empire; Republic of Venice (also on behalf of Marco II Sanudo and Bartholomew I Ghisi)

The Byzantine–Venetian treaty of 1277 was an agreement between the Byzantine Empire and the Republic of Venice that renegotiated and extended for two years the previous 1268 treaty between the two powers. The agreement was beneficial for both sides: Byzantine emperor Michael VIII Palaiologos kept the Venetians and their fleet from participating in the attempts of Charles of Anjou to organize an anti-Byzantine crusade, while the Venetians were able to retain their access to the Byzantine market, and even augment their trading privileges by gaining direct access to the Black Sea and the right to their own quarters in Constantinople and Thessalonica. Furthermore, they were able to stop the Byzantine reconquest of Venetian-aligned territories in the Aegean, although the treaty explicitly allowed both sides to continue fighting for control of the island of Euboea (Negroponte). Nevertheless, the agreement's short duration made clear that for both parties, it was a temporary expedient. After the treaty expired, the Venetians allied with Charles of Anjou, but their plans were thwarted by the outbreak of the War of the Sicilian Vespers in 1282, forcing Venice once more to renew the peace with the Byzantines in 1285.

== Background ==
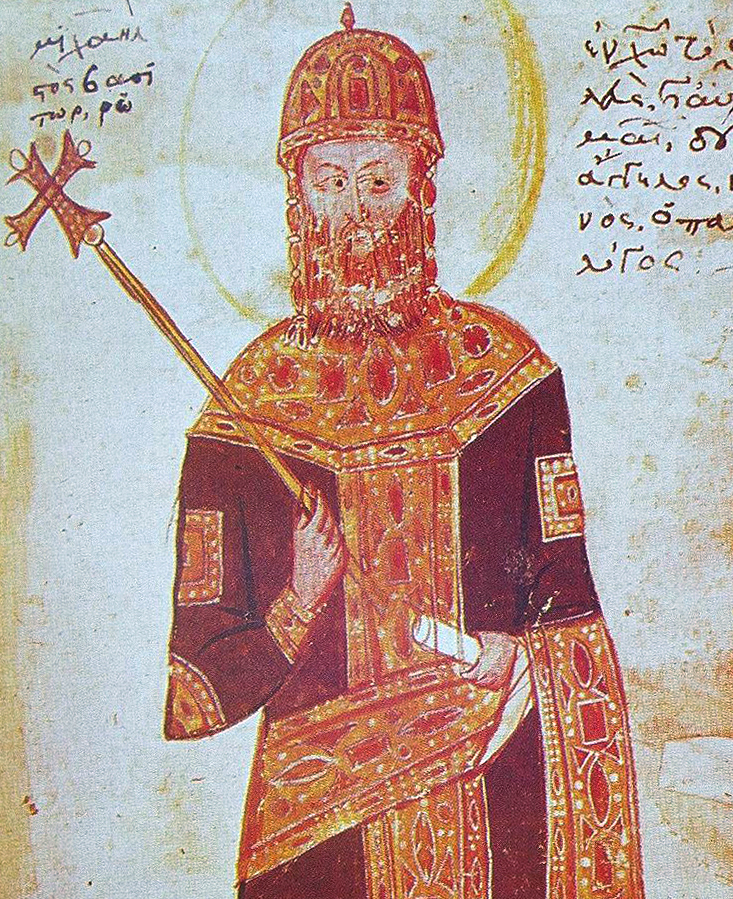
Emperor Michael VIII Palaiologos (14th-century miniature from George Pachymeres' History).

The reconquest of Constantinople by the Nicaean emperor Michael VIII Palaiologos in 1261, and the re-establishment of the Byzantine Empire under the Palaiologos dynasty, was a major blow to the position and commercial interests of the Republic of Venice in the Eastern Mediterranean. To safeguard himself against the mighty Venetian fleet, Palaiologos had also allied with the Republic of Genoa, which was at war with Venice, in the Treaty of Nymphaeum. However, the Genoese defeats in the war against Venice, along with the gradual consolidation of Palaiologos' own position, led to a widening rift between the two allies. In 1264, when the Genoese podestà in Constantinople was implicated in a plot to surrender the city to Manfred of Sicily, the Emperor expelled the Genoese from the Byzantine capital.

In the aftermath, Palaiologos began negotiations with Venice for a peace treaty. A draft agreement was reached on 18 June 1265, but it was not ratified by the Doge of Venice. With the rise of the ambitious Charles of Anjou in Italy, both Palaiologos and the Venetians became interested in a mutual rapprochement, leading finally to the conclusion of a five-year peace treaty in 1268. Reflecting the improved negotiating position of the Byzantine emperor, its terms were more advantageous to him than the 1265 treaty. The truce originally expired in 1273, but it is clear from the wording of the 1277 treaty that it had continued being in force for some time afterward as well. It is unknown whether that was due to an annual extension—possibly repeated—of the treaty, or a complete new treaty that has not survived.

The treaty's provisions regarding the free and safe movement of Venetian merchants and their goods were not scrupulously observed by the Byzantines, leading to vociferous protests by the Venetians: in 1278, the Doge submitted more than 300 cases of injury done to Venetian ships, merchants, and goods since 1268, at the hands of the Emperor's subjects; many of them pirates in Imperial employ, but also including soldiers, customs officials and local governors, and even, on one occasion, a sebastokrator (possibly Palaiologos' half-brother Constantine), who had robbed and murdered a Venetian archdeacon captured on a ship off the Morea. Nevertheless, following the Union of the Churches at the Second Council of Lyon in 1274, Palaiologos was at a strong position: the Popes now recognized him as a legitimate ruler, blocked Charles of Anjou's plans to attack Constantinople, and tried to recruit the Byzantines into their plans for a Crusade to recover the Holy Land. At the same time, the Byzantines had been making headway against the various Latin principalities established in the Aegean in the aftermath of the Fourth Crusade. Headed by the Latin renegade Licario, the Byzantine fleet recovered most of the smaller Aegean islands, and much of the large island of Negroponte (Euboea), apart from its capital, the city of Negroponte (Chalkis), which was defended by a Venetian bailo.

== Treaty of 1277 ==
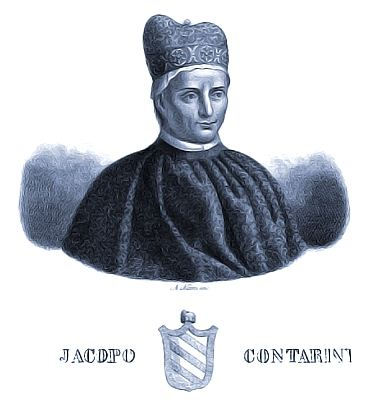
Portrait of Doge Jacopo Contarini, from the Storia dei Dogi di Venezia, 1867

Dismayed at the Byzantine advances, and by the threat posed to Venetian commerce by the corsairs funded by Palaiologos, the Venetians sent envoys to Constantinople to renew the 1268 treaty. A Venetian embassy under Marino Valaresso, Marco Giustinian, and Angelo Marcello had been at the Byzantine court already in 1275. Walter Norden (Das Papsttum und Byzanz, 1903) speculated that a treaty was signed already in that year, but there is no evidence for that in the sources. Events were helped along by the death of the recalcitrant Doge Lorenzo Tiepolo, who resisted any concessions to Palaiologos, and his succession by Jacopo Contarini. The Venetians were also worried by the renewal of a Byzantine treaty with the Genoese, which guaranteed their possession of Galata across the Golden Horn from Constantinople, giving the Genoese an advantage in trade with the Empire.

On 2 September 1276, the Venetian ambassadors, Marco Bembo and Matteo Gradenigo, received authority to conduct negotiations and conclude an agreement. Contarini was careful to avoid terms that might give offense to Palaiologos, omitting the title 'Lord of one-quarter and one-eighth of the Empire of Romania' that his predecessors had claimed since the Fourth Crusade, and limiting himself to the title of 'Doge of Venice, Dalmatia, and Croatia, and lord of the places and islands subject to his Dogate' (Latin: Venecie, Dalmacie et Croacie Dux, dominus terrarum et insularum suo Ducatui subiectarum). Likewise, the Doge was careful to address Palaiologos as 'Emperor of the Romans' (Imperator et moderator Romeorum) and 'the New Constantine' (novus Constantinus). Gradenigo died during the long negotiations, and the agreement was finally concluded by Bembo alone on 19 March 1277. Notably, this agreement was not phrased as a treaty between equals, but rather as a chrysobull, a deed of grant, from the Emperor, "desirous of keeping the peace with all Christians", to Venice.

=== Terms ===
Map of the southern Greece, with the Byzantine possessions and the Latin states, c. 1278

The Latin text of the treaty is published in the collection of Venetian documents by Tafel and Thomas, and its Greek text by Miklosich and Müller. The clauses of the treaty were:

1. A truce of two-year duration, on land and sea, between the two powers. The truce would be automatically extended for a further six months after that, unless either of the two contracting parties announced its intention to terminate the treaty beforehand.
2. The Emperor agreed to respect Venetian possession of Crete, and to withdraw his troops, sent in support of the revolt of the Chortatzes brothers, from the island. In the next clause, the Emperor recognized Venetian possession of the fortresses of Modon and Coron, and agreed to not molest them in any way. Both clauses had also been in the 1268 treaty.
3. Both sides were given liberty to act against each other and their allies in Negroponte, without restriction, even to the point of conquering it. In the 1265 draft treaty, Palaiologos had been given a similar free hand, but Venetian citizens had been prohibited from aiding the Lombard lords of the island against the Byzantines.
4. The Emperor recognized the remaining island possessions of the two major Latin rulers in the Cyclades, Marco II Sanudo, Duke of Naxos, and Bartholomew I Ghisi, both of Venetian origin. In exchange, the two lords undertook to not aid the Emperor's enemies, nor to provide shelter to corsairs hostile to his interests.
5. The Emperor would accord to the Venetians their own quarter in Constantinople, extending along the sea wall of the Golden Horn, from the Gate of the Droungarios inland to the churches of St. Akindynos and Mary, thence to the street of the Zonarai, and down to the Perama Gate on the sea wall. Within that district, the Emperor would provide three houses for the Venetian bailo, his councillors, and for use as a warehouse. Two churches, of Mary and St. Mark, were to be used by the Venetians, and 25 houses were to be provided, free of rent, for the use of Venetian merchants, the number to fluctuate according to needs. This was on the same site, but not as extensive, as the Venetian quarter that had existed in Constantinople before the Fourth Crusade. Similar arrangements were to be made at Thessalonica, with three houses provided for the leaders of the Venetian community, up to 25 houses for the merchants, and the use of a church "formerly used by the Armenians". The Venetians were also accorded the right to rent houses, baths, and bakeries in any part of the Empire, according to their needs.
6. For the first time, the issue of the gasmouloi, offspring of mixed Greek and Venetian unions during the Latin Empire (1204–1261), was addressed. They were to be considered as Venetian citizens, with the full corresponding rights and liberties.
7. As in the 1268 agreement, the Venetians would have the right to use their own weights and measures and have their own Latin Rite churches.
8. The Emperor's treaty with the Genoese was recognized as valid, and the Genoese would not be expelled from the Empire. As in the 1268 treaty, the Venetians were enjoined to maintain peace with the Genoese between Abydos on the entrance of the Dardanelles, and the northern entrance to the Bosporus on the Black Sea, and any quarrel between the two was referred for arbitration to the Emperor. Any compensation decreed by the Emperor would have to be realized within half a year, but if it were not forthcoming, the Emperor would provide it himself.
9. The Venetians were given the right to trade freely in the Empire, and were relieved of any taxes or customs duties on Venetian goods. Non-Venetian goods would have to be declared. Transgressions by Imperial customs officials would be recompensed from the Imperial treasury. The Venetian merchants were placed under the authority and responsibility of the bailo and the local rectors. This was followed by a clause confirming the complete liberty of the Venetians and the inviolability of the privileges, prohibiting the imposition of any duty or restriction to their commerce.
10. The Emperor undertook to compensate Venetians who had suffered losses at the hands of Imperial subjects or agents since 1268, and the Venetians undertook a reciprocal obligation.
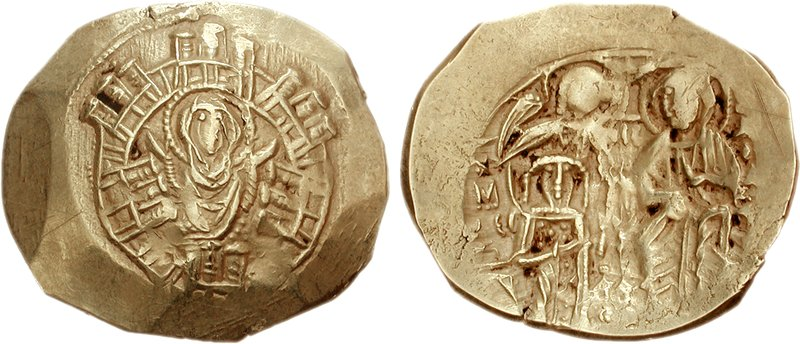
11. Hyperpyron of Michael VIII Palaiologos
  The subsequent clauses of the treaty concern legal affairs of Venetians who died on Imperial soil, jurisdiction in case of disputes or crimes involving Byzantines and Venetians, and shipwrecks, mostly repeating the terms of the earlier treaty. The provisions for the purchase of grain were also repeated, in modified form: due to the debasement of the gold hyperpyron initiated by Palaiologos, the Venetians would now pay 100, instead of 50, hyperpyra to the 100 modioi of grain, but were allowed to export it directly from the Black Sea. A new provision regulated the commerce of Byzantine merchants in Venice itself.
12. Both sides would release their respective prisoners.
13. Venice undertook not to ally with, or allow its ships to be used to carry the troops of, any prince who might attack Palaiologos. Likewise, the Empire undertook not allow the manufacture of arms against the Venetians, and to compensate them if that should happen.
14. If either party violated the terms of the treaty, both sides pledged not to start hostilities, but instead negotiate.

== Aftermath ==
It is clear that both sides were cautious, hedging their bets in view of the volatile international situation, as seen by the treaty's short duration. Venice in particular still hoped for the realization of a crusade against Palaiologos, that might lead to the restoration of Venetian domination as it had existed before 1261.

As a result, the treaty was not renewed after its expiration, and in 1281, the Venetians in the Treaty of Orvieto entered Charles of Anjou's anti-Byzantine coalition, with April 1283 as the projected starting date for the expedition against Constantinople. However, Charles' designs were fatally interrupted by the outbreak of the Sicilian Vespers in March 1282 and the consequent War of the Sicilian Vespers. By the terms of the Treaty of Orvieto, a state of war existed between Venice and Byzantium. The outbreak of the Vespers had ruined Venetian chances to recover their privileged position, and for the duration of the state of war their trade with the East was interrupted, much to the advantage of the Genoese. After long negotiations, a ten-year peace treaty, essentially renewing the 1277 agreement, was concluded in July 1285.

== Venetian compensation claims ==
The compensation clause included in the treaty has been the subject of some debate among modern scholars: according to the terms, the mechanism for compensation was to be 'in accordance with the form of the first truce', but there is nothing in the 1268 treaty to this effect. Such a clause may have been inserted, however, in any renewal or renegotiation of the treaty after 1273. In accordance to this clause, the Venetian government set up a three-member commission to examine the claims of Venetian merchants for losses incurred by Imperial agents during the truce. The commissioners, Giberto Dandolo, Marino Gradenigo, and Lorenzo Sagredo, examined 339 claims on 257 incidents, consulting official dispatches by Venetian agents in the Aegean as well as oral evidence from individuals, and issued their report in March 1278. The Venetian claims totalled about 35,000 hyperpyra, but it was not until the 1285 treaty that the Venetian claims were recognized by the Byzantine Emperor Andronikos II Palaiologos (r. 1282–1328), who agreed to pay out 24,000 hyperpyra in compensation.
