= Hugh of Sully =

Hugh of Sully (French: Hugues de Sully) was a general under the Sicilian King Charles of Anjou. He was nicknamed "the Red" ("le Rousseau") on account of his red hair.

A Burgundian knight of fiery and haughty temperament, according to the chroniclers, Hugh was named Vicar-General of Charles' Kingdom of Albania in August 1279, and led the Sicilian forces in their unsuccessful attempt to take Berat from the Byzantine Empire in 1280–1281. Sully was taken prisoner in an ambush, whereupon his army scattered and suffered many losses to the pursuing Byzantines. He was then taken to Constantinople where he was paraded in the streets along with the other captives. Sully was eventually released after years in Byzantine captivity and returned to Italy.
