= Byzantine–Venetian treaty of 1082 =

1082 treaty between Venice and the Byzantine Empire

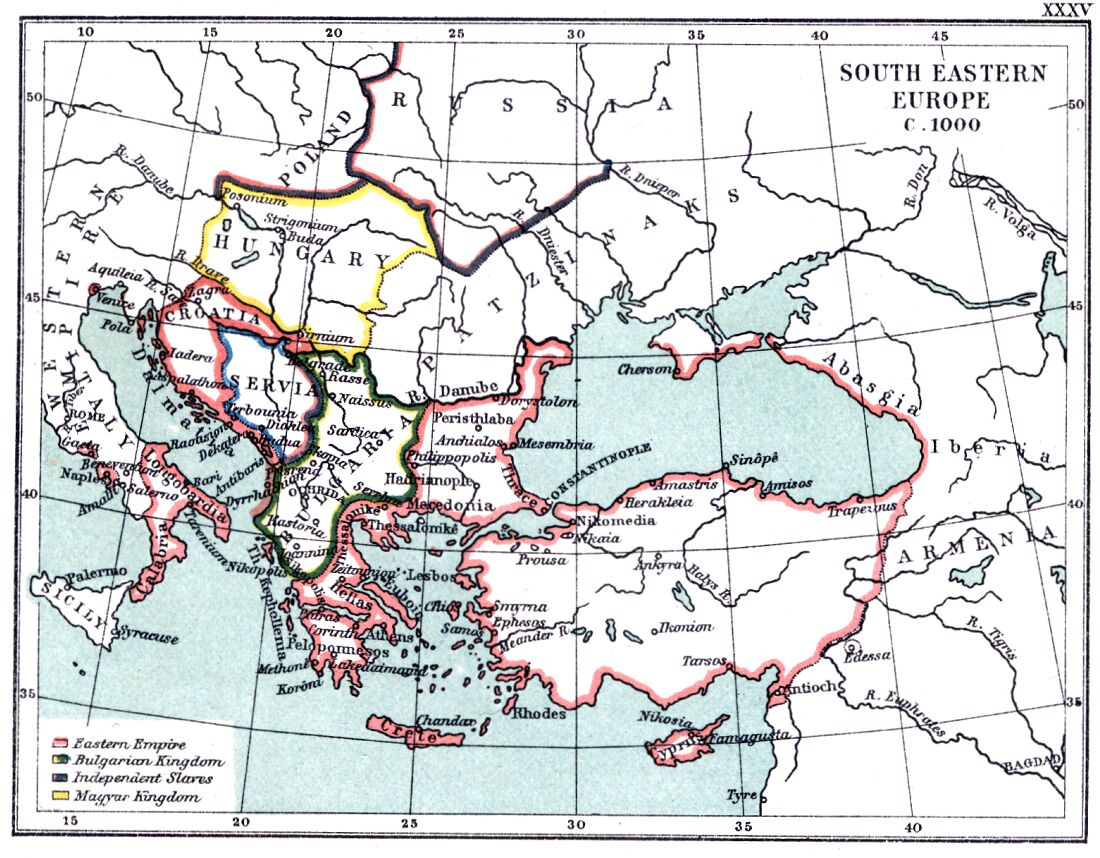
- The Byzantine Empire and neighbouring countries at the beginning of the 11th century
- Type: Chrysobull
- Context: Byzantine–Norman wars
- Signatories: Byzantine Empire; Republic of Venice

The Byzantine–Venetian treaty of 1082 was a trade and defence pact signed between the Byzantine Empire and the Republic of Venice, in the form of an imperial chrysobull or golden bull, issued by Emperor Alexios I Komnenos. This treaty, which provided the Venetians with major trading concessions in exchange for their help in the wars against the Normans, would have a major impact on both the empire and the republic that would later dictate their histories for several centuries to come.

== Stipulations ==
The Byzantine Empire made a large number of trade concessions to the Republic of Venice in exchange for military support against the Normans who were invading and conquering various Byzantine holdings in and outside the empire. According to the treaty, the Byzantines would allow the Venetians the right to trade throughout the empire without the imposition of taxes. The Venetians would also be allowed control of the main harbor facilities of Byzantium (Constantinople), along with control of several key public offices. The treaty also granted various honors to the Doge of Venice, along with an income. Finally, the Venetians were granted their own district within Byzantium, with shops, a church, and a bakery, which could be compared to the concessions of 19th century colonialism.

In exchange for these trade concessions, the Byzantine Empire requested military support from the Venetians, especially in the form of ships, since the empire had no real navy to speak of.

== Consequences ==
The military aid promised by the Republic of Venice did in fact arrive in the form of a naval blockade of the Normans at Dyrrachium, which forced the Normans to engage in a battle with the Romans. However, the Venetians' gains largely overweighed those of the Romans as they reaped great benefits from the new trade advantages they enjoyed by the treaty. The Byzantine Empire's ability to recuperate after losses was significantly reduced, because of the immense revenue the empire had given up when it allowed the Venetians to trade freely without the imposition of taxes. This stifled the empire's power of recuperation and ultimately started its terminal decline.

== See also ==
- List of Byzantine foreign treaties
