= Treaty of Orvieto =

1281 treaty between Sicily, Venice, and the Latin Empire

The Treaty of Orvieto was an agreement made in 1281 between Charles I of Sicily, Giovanni Dandolo, Doge of Venice, and Philip of Courtenay, titular Latin Emperor, for recovery of the Latin Empire, with the blessing of the Papacy. Intended to restore Latin domination, both civil and ecclesiastical, to Greece, it was forestalled by the War of the Sicilian Vespers, which diverted the resources of Charles to the recovery of Sicily.

== Background ==
Charles had long aspired to assemble a trans-Mediterranean kingdom. A younger brother of the French king, Louis IX, he had enlarged his appanage of Provence by agreeing to act as the Papal champion against the Hohenstaufen in 1263. He was rewarded with the Kingdom of Sicily as a papal fief, and almost immediately began to look eastward for further lands. With the defeat of Manfred of Sicily in 1266, Charles sent an army to Albania to seize the dowry of Manfred's wife, Helena of Epirus.

This brought Charles into conflict with Emperor Michael VIII in the Adriatic theater. Baldwin II of Courtenay, then titular Latin Emperor, made a natural ally. Driven out of Constantinople by Michael VIII in 1261, Baldwin was practically penniless and desperate for aid to regain his empire. Charles agreed, but at a significant price: the two signed the Treaty of Viterbo in 1267, wherein Charles agreed to help reconquer the Latin Empire in exchange for the suzerainty of Achaea and other important concessions.

However, the invasion of Italy by Conradin and the Eighth Crusade combined to delay any intervention by Charles. Under Pope Gregory X, negotiations for the union of the Roman Catholic and Greek Orthodox Churches were initiated, and any move by Charles against Constantinople was forbidden. However, he was encouraged by the Pope to purchase the claim of Maria of Antioch to the Kingdom of Jerusalem in 1277, to which he sent a bailli to rule in his name. This was part of a papal strategy to preserve the Kingdom of Jerusalem by integrating it into a trans-Mediterranean empire allied with the French royal house, which would provide the necessary resource for the Kingdom's defense. In 1278, by a provision of the Treaty of Viterbo, the Principality of Achaea also came under his direct rule.

The accession of Pope Martin IV, who was largely under Charles' influence, removed the last obstacle to Charles' ambitions. The new Pope declared the Union of the Churches a failure, clearing the way for Charles' plans of conquest. Like the Treaty of Viterbo, the new alliance against Constantinople would unite the arms of Charles and the dynast of the Latin Empire (now Philip of Courtenay, Baldwin II having died in 1273) under Papal sanction. Furthermore, the Venetians, who had played a key role in the Latin Empire but had not subscribed to the Treaty of Viterbo, were also to be brought into the alliance.

== Provisions ==
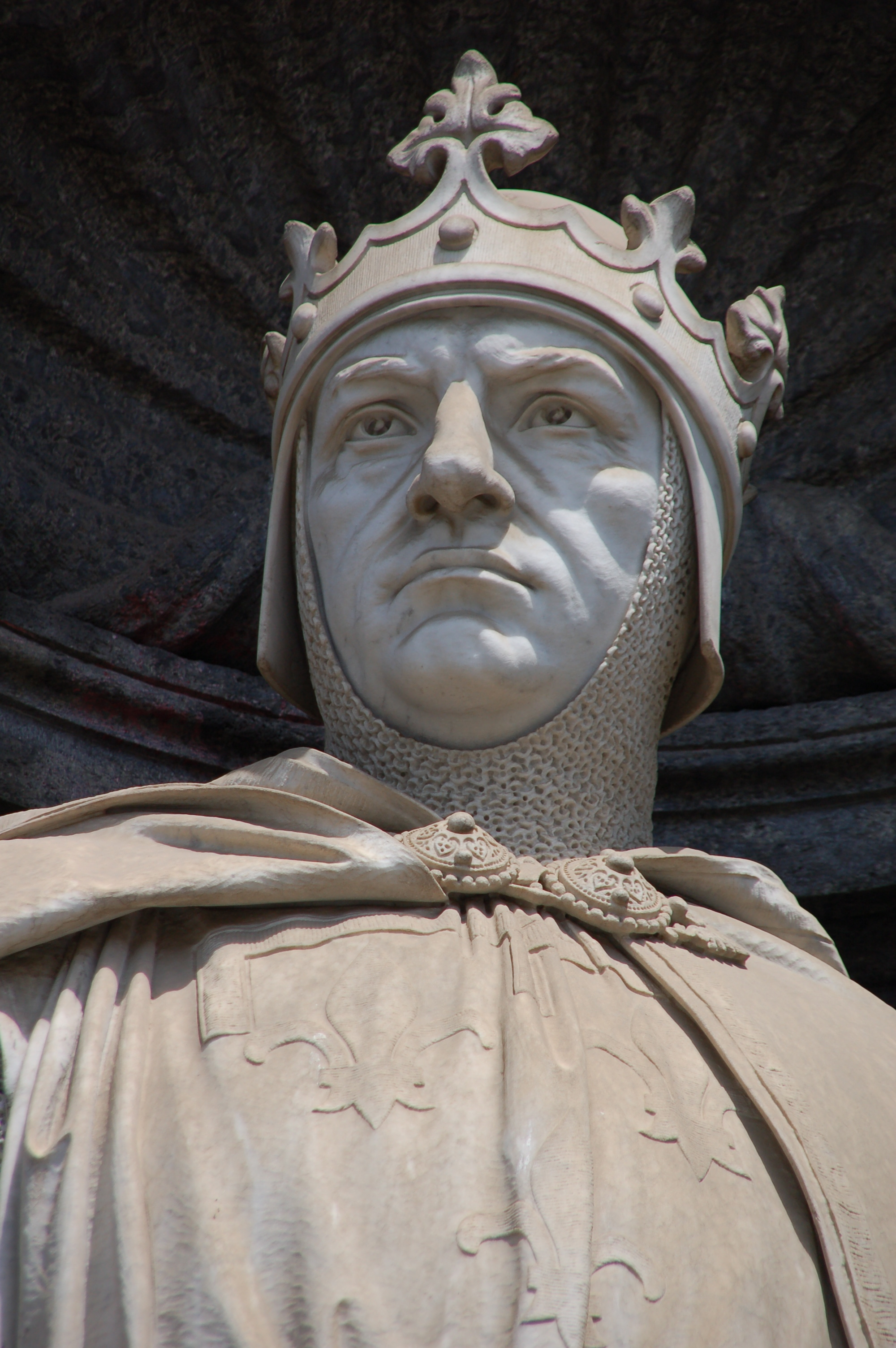
Charles I of Sicily, one of the high contracting parties to the treaty.

Like the Treaty of Viterbo, the new treaty was signed in the Papal palace, which Pope Martin IV had moved to Orvieto after Viterbo was placed under interdict for imprisoning two cardinals. Its stated purpose was the dethronement of the Byzantine Emperor Michael VIII in favor of Philip and the establishment of the Union of the Churches, bringing the Greek Orthodox Church under the authority of the Pope. Its practical motivation, however, was to re-establish the Latin Empire, under Angevin domination, and to restore Venetian commercial privileges in Constantinople.

Under the terms of the treaty, Philip and Charles were to supply 8,000 troops and mounts, and sufficient ships to transport them to Constantinople. Philip, Dandolo, and Charles, or Charles' son, Charles, Prince of Salerno, were to personally accompany the expedition. In practice, Charles would have supplied almost all of the troops, Philip having little or no resources of his own. The Venetians would supply forty galleys as escorts for the invasion fleet, which was to sail from Brindisi no later than April 1283. Upon Philip's restoration to the throne, he was to confirm the concessions of the Treaty of Viterbo and the privileges granted to Venice at the founding of the Latin Empire, including recognition of the Doge as dominator of "one-fourth and one-eighth of the Latin Empire."

A second document was also drawn up to organize a vanguard to precede the main expedition of 1283. Charles and Philip were to supply fifteen ships and ten transports with about 300 men and horses. The Venetians were to provide fifteen warships for seven months of the year. These forces would make war against Michael VIII and "other occupiers" of the Latin Empire (presumably the Genoese), and would meet at Corfu by 1 May 1282, paving the way for the next year's invasion.

The two treaties were signed by Charles and Philip on 3 July 1281. They were ratified by the Doge of Venice on 2 August 1281.

== Consequences ==
A few weeks after the signing of the treaty, Pope Martin excommunicated Michael VIII. Provisions were duly made for the expedition, and a few skirmishes took place around Euboea. Nikephoros, the ruler of Epirus, also concluded a treaty with Charles, Philip, and Dandolo in September 1281. However, shortly before the expedition was to sail, the Sicilian Vespers broke out (30 March 1282). The resulting civil war split the Kingdom of Sicily in two, and Charles spent the rest of his life trying to quell it. His descendants would continue to maintain an ever more tenuous rule over parts of the Latin Empire, but no grand expedition against Constantinople was ever mounted.
