= Battle of the Rhyndacus =

Battle of the Rhyndacus River or Battle of the Rhyndacus can refer to one of several battles fought near the Rhyndacus River in modern Turkey:

- Battle of the Rhyndacus (85 BC), during the First Mithridatic War between Mithridates VI of Pontus and the Romans under Flavius Fimbria
- Battle of the Rhyndacus (72 BC), during the Third Mithridatic War between Mithridates VI of Pontus and the Romans under Lucullus
- Battle of the Rhyndacus (1211), between the Nicaean Greeks under Theodore I and the Latin Empire under Henry of Flanders
