= Struggle for Constantinople (1204–1261) =

Conflicts following the Fourth Crusade

- Part of the Byzantine–Latin wars, Byzantine–Bulgarian wars, Byzantine–Seljuk wars, Bulgarian–Latin wars, and the Crusades
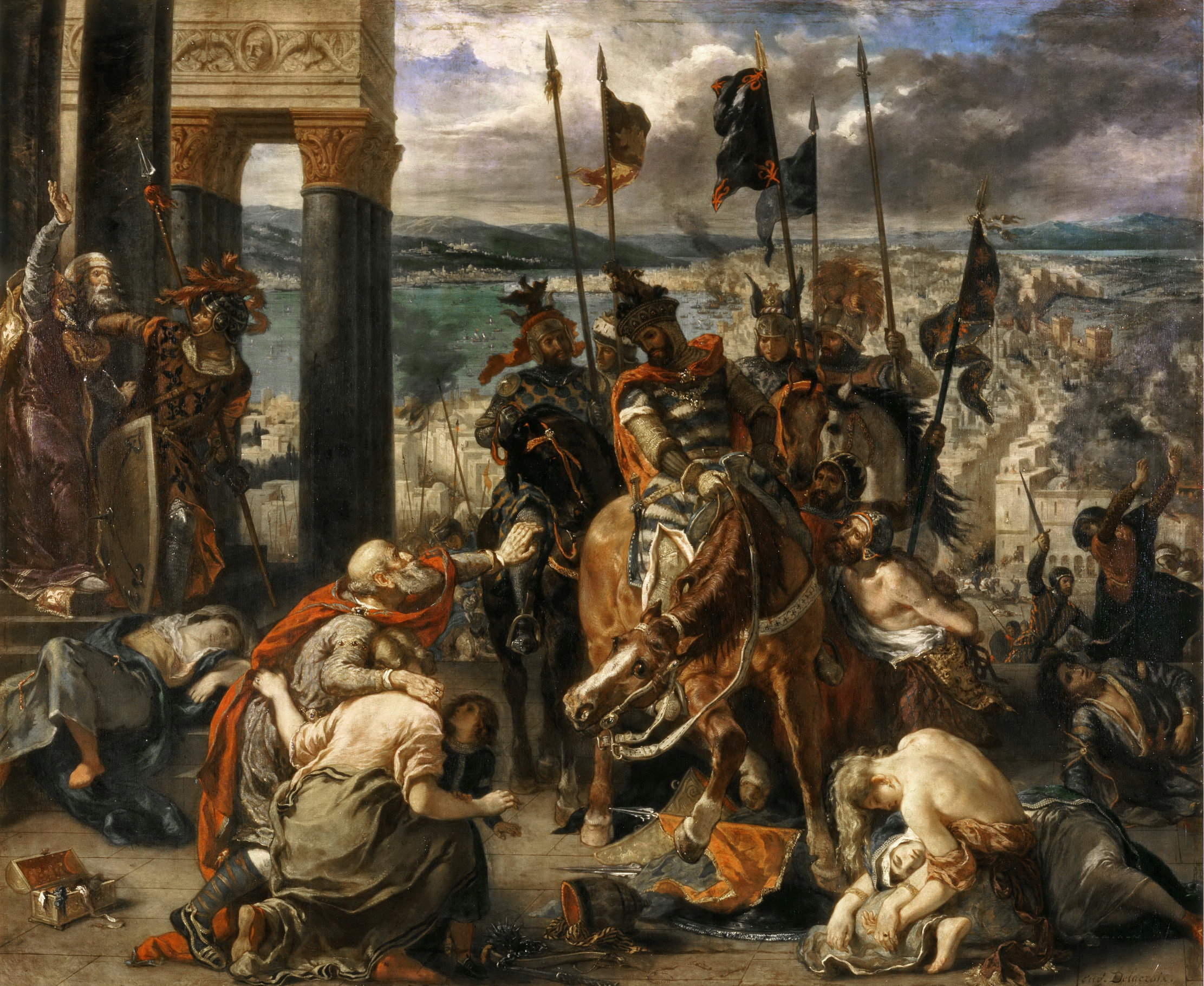
- The Entry of the Crusaders in Constantinople, by Eugène Delacroix
Date	12 April 1204 – 25 July 1261 (57 years, 3 months and 13 days)
Location	The Balkans and Anatolia
Result	Nicaean victory
Territorial changes	The Empire of Nicaea captures Constantinople and restores the Byzantine Empire.

Belligerents
Latin states: Latin Empire; Kingdom of Thessalonica (1204–1224); Principality of Achaea; Duchy of Philippopolis (1204–1208); Duchy of Athens; Duchy of the Archipelago; Republic of Venice	Byzantine states: Empire of Nicaea (1205–1261); Empire of Thessalonica (1225–1242); Empire of Trebizond; Despotate of Epirus; Despotate of Thessaly (1239–1261); Republic of Genoa (Byzantine ally)	Others: Second Bulgarian Empire; Kingdom of Georgia; Sultanate of Rum; Kingdom of Serbia; Kingdom of Sicily; Mongol Empire (1241–1243)

The struggle for Constantinople was a complex series of conflicts following the dissolution of the Byzantine Empire in the aftermath of the Fourth Crusade in 1204, fought between the Latin Empire established by the Crusaders, various Byzantine successor states, and foreign powers such as the Second Bulgarian Empire and Sultanate of Rum, for control of Constantinople and supremacy within the former imperial territories.

At the time of the Fourth Crusade, the Byzantine Empire was already divided by internal revolts. In the aftermath of the Crusader sack of Constantinople, the empire was dissolved into a patchwork of territories held by various pretenders and warlords. The former Byzantine emperors Alexios III and Alexios V both aspired to retake the capital, though were defeated by the Latins. The early years after 1204 saw the rise and fall of numerous Byzantine statelets; the Latins managed to defeat warlords such as Leo Sgouros but were unable to halt the formation of the more well-organized rump states of the Empire of Nicaea, Empire of Trebizond, and Despotate of Epirus. The prospect of a potential swift Latin conquest of the entire former empire's territories effectively ended when the Bulgarian ruler Kaloyan defeated the Latin army at the Battle of Adrianople (1205).

In the years 1205–1209, the Empire of Nicaea transitioned into a proper empire-in-exile, with Theodore Laskaris crowned as emperor by a self-appointed Ecumenical Patriarch of Constantinople-in-exile. The Nicene emperor and his patriarch were not accepted as legitimate by the other Byzantine pretenders. An attempted two-front attack on both Epirus and Nicaea by the Latin emperor Robert of Courtenay in 1223/1224 ended in disaster for the latter and the Latin Empire thereafter only survived the following decades through the rivalry between its enemies. In 1224, Theodore Komnenos Doukas of Epirus captured Thessalonica, the second most important city of the former empire. Komnenous Doukas likewise had himself crowned emperor, establishing the Empire of Thessalonica, and came close to recapturing Constantinople before being defeated by Bulgaria at the Battle of Klokotnitsa in 1230.

After Klokotnitsa, Ivan Asen II of Bulgaria aspired to himself restore the Byzantine Empire, variously allying with and opposing the Nicene emperor John Doukas Vatatzes. In the early 1240s, Bulgaria was weakened by Ivan Asen's death and pressure from the Mongol Empire. During the Mongol invasion of Anatolia, Sultan Kaykhusraw II of Rum was—despite support by Christian forces sent by the Latin, Nicene, and Trapezuntine empires—defeated at the Battle of Köse Dağ (1243) and forced to submit as a Mongol vassal. The weakening of Bulgaria and Rum allowed John Doukas Vatatzes to rapidly expand into the Balkans. Although opposed by Bulgaria, the Thessalonian successor states, and the remaining Latin lords of Greece, the Nicenes under Michael Palaiologos ultimately captured Constantinople in 1261, restoring the Byzantine Empire.

Conflicts resulting from the struggle for Constantinople plagued much of the later reign of Michael Palaiologos (1261–1282). Despite challenges, Palaiologos managed to ensure the safety of the restored empire, which survived for two centuries under his descendants, until its fall in 1453.

== Background ==
=== Byzantium and the Latins ===
Territorial evolution of the Byzantine Empire, 379–1453

The Byzantine (or Eastern Roman) Empire was the medieval continuation of the Roman Empire, ruled from Constantinople. Similar to the ancient Roman emperors, the Byzantine emperors considered themselves universal rulers, nominally ruling all Christendom. Although Byzantine territory gradually declined over the centuries, their claim to rule continued to be acknowledged by temporal and religious authorities in Western Europe, even if formal imperial control could not be restored. In the reign of Emperor Constantine V (r. 741–775), Byzantine efforts were concentrated on the Muslims and the Bulgars, and the defense of Italy was neglected, leading to the fall of the Exarchate of Ravenna, the main Byzantine administrative unit in Italy, to the Lombards in 751. The popes, technically Byzantine vassals, realized that Byzantine support was not a guarantee and instead began to rely on the major western kingdom, the Franks, for support against the Lombards. In 800, Pope Leo III crowned the Frankish king Charlemagne as emperor, laying the groundwork for the later Holy Roman Empire, severing the papacy's connection to the Byzantine Empire, and challenging Byzantium's claim to universal rule.

The Byzantines self-identified as Romans (Rhōmaîoi). Given that they themselves used Greek as both a vernacular and religious language, the common term used in Byzantium for westerners from the 11th century onwards was "Latins" (Latinoi), in reference to the church language of the Catholic Church. Westerners typically referred to the Byzantines as "Greeks". Relations between Byzantium and the west significantly deteriorated with the Great Schism of 1054, which ended communion between the Catholic and Eastern Orthodox churches. Although the Byzantines continued to consider the pope in Rome to be the most important patriarch in the pentarchy, Byzantine religious affairs thereafter became more isolated and reflective of their own customs. Byzantine writers routinely described Western Europeans as uncouth barbarians, while the westerners in turn viewed the Byzantines as effeminate and treacherous.

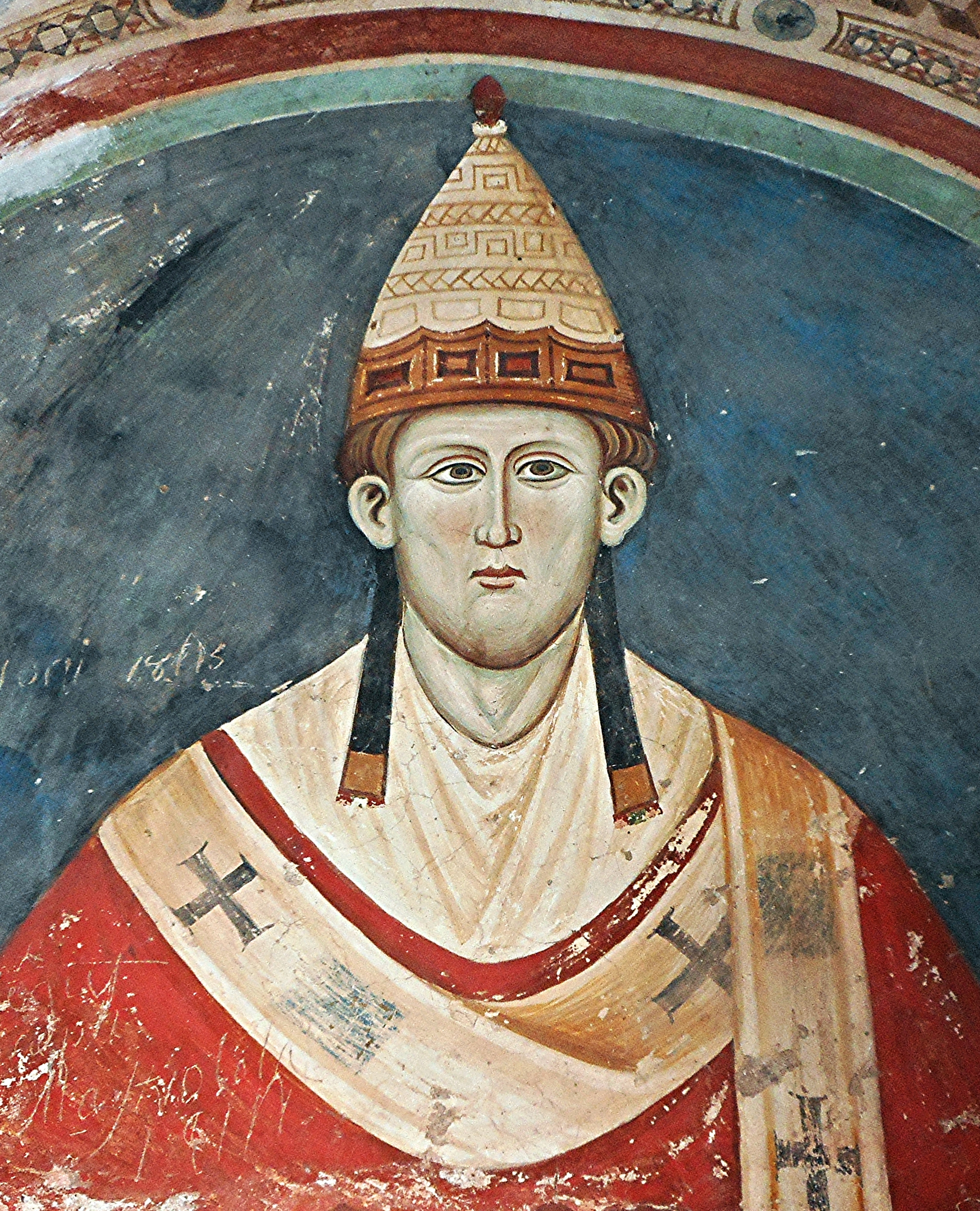
Pope Innocent III (pope 1198–1216)

The Byzantine Empire was nearly driven out of Anatolia, which had traditionally provided the bulk of the empire's armies, by the Seljuk Empire in the 1070s. Emperor Alexios I Komnenos (r. 1081–1118) called for military aid from Pope Urban II, who responded by calling the First Crusade (1096–1099). Although successful in repelling Seljuk advances and restoring Byzantine control over large parts of Anatolia, the crusade generated new difficulties for the Byzantines. The Crusaders cared little that lands they sacked on their way to the Holy Land had been Byzantine merely a few decades prior. The First Crusade solidified the differences between Byzantium and the West and brought hostility to the popular level. When Crusaders under Bohemond of Taranto captured Antioch in 1098, the Crusaders did not return the city to the Byzantines and Bohemond went as far as to appoint a Latin patriarch in the city instead of recognizing the incumbent Orthodox patriarch, causing outcry in Constantinople. Over the course of the Crusades, Crusaders and other westerners (such as the Republic of Venice) were attracted by the splendor and wealth of Byzantium, but repeatedly enraged by Byzantine foreign policy.

Emperor Manuel I Komnenos (r. 1143–1180) unsuccessfully sought to reunify the Orthodox and Latin churches, and also tried to integrate the Byzantine Empire into the world of Latin states in the West and the Levant (the Crusader states) through diplomacy. These diplomatic efforts were largely unsuccessful, since the Latin polities began to view themselves as having a say in imperial politics and a strong anti-Latin sentiment grew in Byzantium, owing to Manuel's concessions and increasing Latin domination. Tensions in Constantinople reached a boiling point after Manuel's death, resulting in the 1182 Massacre of the Latins. The massacre was in 1185 followed by an invasion by the Norman Kingdom of Sicily which resulted in a brutal sack of Thessalonica, deepening the rift between Byzantium and the West. At the same time as tensions were increasing, Byzantium under the Komnenos (1081–1185) and Angelos (1185–1204) dynasties was experiencing a collapse of central authority and manpower issues resulting from an increasingly powerful aristocracy. Despite the decline, Constantinople remained the greatest city in Christendom. During the Third Crusade (1189–1192), the Holy Roman Emperor Frederick Barbarossa led an army through the Byzantine Empire. The march caused Byzantine emperor Isaac II Angelos (r. 1185–1195) to panic, believing Barbarossa also planned to overthrow Byzantium. Isaac imprisoned several Latin citizens in Constantinople and concluded a secret alliance with the Muslim ruler Saladin, promising to delay and destroy Barbarossa's army in return for concessions in the Holy Land. Although full war was avoided, the mistreatment sustained by Barbarossa and his army was long remembered in the West.

=== The Fourth Crusade (1202–1204) ===
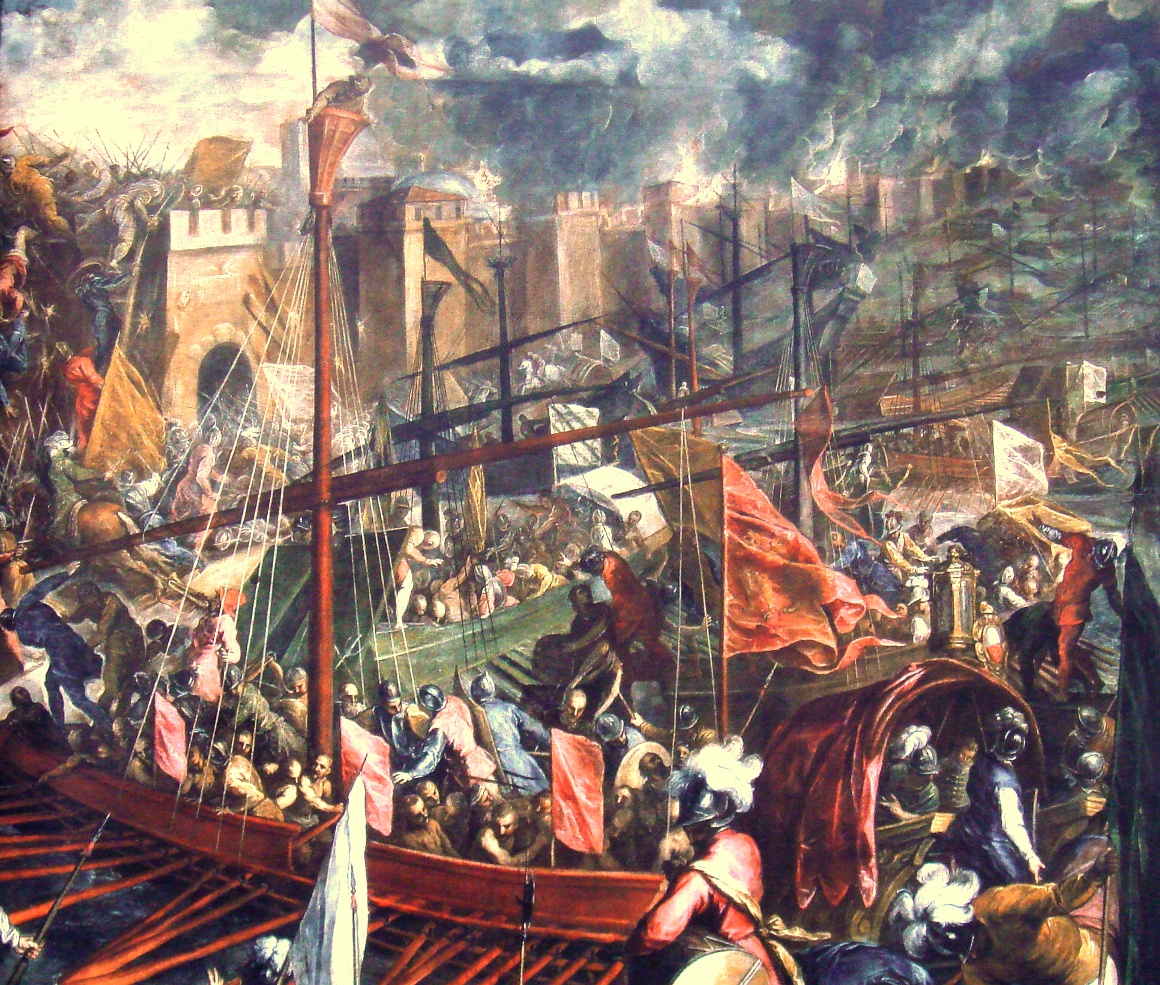
The Taking of Constantinople, by Palma il Giovane (1548/50–1628)

Pope Innocent III called for a Fourth Crusade in 1198 and a Crusader army assembled at Venice in 1202. The leader of the crusade, Boniface of Montferrat, lobbied for a diversion to Constantinople instead of attacking the Holy Land, and succeeded in convincing the crusade leadership as well as the Republic of Venice when it became apparent that the Crusaders had less money and soldiers than had been anticipated. The legitimization of the attack was provided through Alexios IV Angelos, a Byzantine prince and son of Isaac II Angelos, who had traveled to the West and asked for aid in supplanting his uncle Alexios III Angelos (r. 1195–1203, who had usurped Isaac II) on the Byzantine throne. Although Pope Innocent tried to dissuade an attack on Constantinople, writing to the Crusaders in April 1203 that "it is not your business to judge the crimes of Constantinople" and Venice had signed a treaty with Alexios III in 1198, promising to be faithful allies, the plans proceeded. Priests accompanying the crusade justified an attack on Christian Byzantium since "the Greeks are schismatics, worse than the Jews".

The Fourth Crusade reached Constantinople on 24 June 1203. The Crusaders marveled at the vastness of the city and the Byzantines were astonished by the size of the army. Alexios III offered to pay them to leave, though the Crusaders demanded his immediate abdication. When Alexios IV was paraded in front of the city's walls, the populace of Constantinople rejected the young prince. Following several Crusader assaults on the city, Alexios III fled Constantinople in the night of 17/18 July. The confused court and high command of the empire restored the deposed Isaac II to the throne, disarming the Crusaders' pretext of restoring legitimacy to the Byzantine government. Alexios IV was made co-emperor under pressure from the Crusaders on 1 August 1204. Alexios IV immediately began paying the Crusders, resorting to plundering churches, and promised to submit the empire's church to the Pope, though no action was taken to achieve this. The Crusaders stayed in Constantinople, claiming that it was too late in the season for them to depart, and Alexios IV agreed to host them until March 1204. As the westerners mistreated the locals and the locals resisted in turn, Alexios IV began to be regarded as an "abomination" by his subjects. A Constantinopolitan resistance against the Latins formed in late 1203, in which the nobleman Alexios Doukas became a leading figure. As Isaac II laid dying of natural causes, the populace elected a new (unwilling) emperor in Hagia Sophia on 27 January 1204, Nicholas Kanabos. A few days later, Alexios Doukas had both Alexios IV and Kanabos arrested and executed. In their stead, Doukas was proclaimed emperor in Hagia Sophia on 5 February, becoming Alexios V.

After several skirmishes, a Crusader assault on 12–13 April made Alexios V also flee the capital. Over the course of the next three days, the Crusaders brutally sacked Constantinople. Over its centuries as the greatest Christian city, Constantinople had accumulated vast wealth and innumerable holy relics, now looted or destroyed. The common people were slaughtered and raped indiscriminately. In Hagia Sophia, the Latins hacked the great altar to pieces and had a French prostitute dressed in the patriarch's robes to put on a show. The tombs of past Byzantine emperors were plundered and desecrated, including those of Justinian I and Basil II. As a result of numerous great fires started during the Crusaders' stay in the city, about a sixth of Constantinople was a burned ruin and the rest was depopulated and stripped of anything valuable. The Crusaders wrote to Pope Innocent after the sack, calling it "divine justice" against the schismatic Byzantines, and requested that the defense of their conquered lands in Byzantium be sanctioned as an "ongoing crusade" so that further Crusaders would arrive and bolster their forces.

== Collapse and consolidation (1204–1209) ==
=== Dissolution of the empire (1204) ===
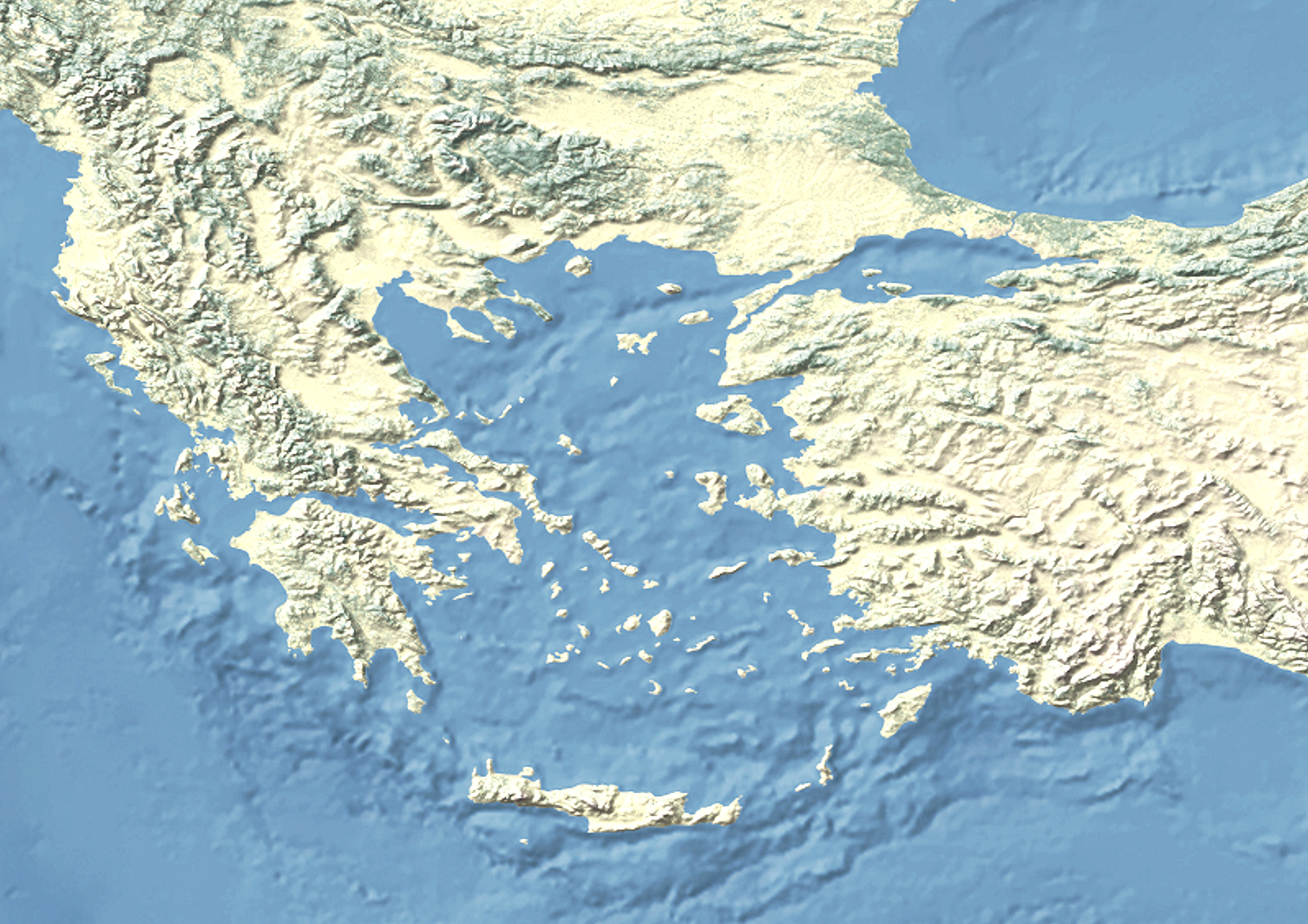
Seats of power of the major figures (other than Alexios Komnenos of Trebizond, further east) in the immediate aftermath of the sack of Constantinople, 1204

Before the sack of Constantinople, the Crusaders and Venetians agreed that a new emperor would be elected by a college of six Venetians and six Crusaders. On 9 May 1204, they elected the Crusader Baldwin of Flanders as Alexios V's successor. Emperor Baldwin I was crowned in the Hagia Sophia in an imitation of Byzantine coronations on 16 May. The Venetian subdeacon Thomas Morosini was made the first Catholic Patriarch of Constantinople. The Venetians and Crusaders concluded a treaty, the Partitio terrarum imperii Romaniae, in which the Byzantine Empire's territory was partitioned. The emperor received a quarter of Constantinople and the empire, with his lands placed in Anatolia and parts of Thrace. The Venetians and other Crusaders each received half of the remainder of the empire, to hold as imperial fiefs. Crusader holdings were primarily in Greece whereas the Venetians fiefs were to consist of islands in the Aegean Sea, some ports, and Epirus.

Baldwin's empire, which the Byzantines dubbed the 'Latin Empire', at first controlled merely Constantinople and its immediate surroundings. Following the sack of the city, the rest of the Byzantine Empire had unraveled into a patchwork of bewildered imperial governors, foreign invaders, rebels, and pretenders. Baldwin's two foremost rivals were the former emperors Alexios III and Alexios V, both of whom had survived the initial Crusader attacks. Alexios V ruled eastern Thrace from Tzurulum and Alexios III, based in Mosynopolis, ruled both western Thrace and the lands surrounding Thessalonica. A third claimant emperor had also risen in the far east, Alexios Komnenos, who had seized Trebizond and the surrounding Black Sea shoreline with the aid of Tamar of Georgia, establishing what historians refer to as the 'Empire of Trebizond'. This Alexios was the grandson of Andronikos I Komnenos, who had reigned as Byzantine emperor 1183–1185.

Other than the imperial claimants, several territories fell under the control of local warlords. The rebel magnate Leo Sgouros controlled large parts of Greece around the cities of Nafplio, Corinth, and Thebes. Much of northwestern Anatolia was held by Theodore Laskaris, Alexios III's son-in-law. Other noteworthy rebel magnates included Leo Gabalas (who controlled Rhodes) and three competing magnates in the Meander valley: Theodore Mangaphas (around Philadelphia), Manuel Maurozomes (in the east), and Sabas Asidenos (around Priene). After the sack of Constantinople, Mangaphas proclaimed himself emperor, becoming a fourth Byzantine imperial claimant. The island of Crete had fallen under Latin control before the sack, being given to Boniface of Montferrat as pronoia by Alexios IV and now held by his men. In southern Anatolia, an Italian adventurer named Aldobrandini seized the city of Attaleia.

=== Anarchy (1204–1205) ===
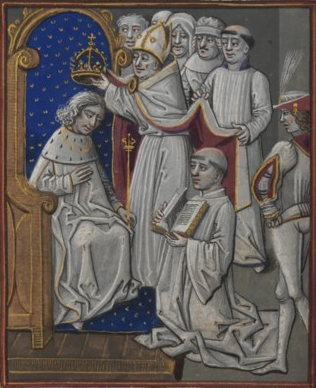
15th-century depiction of Baldwin I's coronation

The Latin Empire was immediately faced with serious internal problems. The Latins had considerably damaged Constantinople, their own new capital, in their sack and much of its wealth had been given away to the Venetians. Some of the new Latin lords also proved unruly, in particular Boniface of Montferrrat who had expected to be elected emperor himself. To placate Boniface, Baldwin promised him a vassal kingdom surrounding Thessalonica, then held by Alexios III. Of the three Alexioi who claimed imperial authority, Alexios III was the best placed to retake Constantinople. Although he had been a disappointing ruler, Alexios III had ruled longer and more successfully than Alexios V, held important territories in the Balkans, and could expect the support of his son-in-law Theodore Laskaris in Anatolia. In the summer of 1204, Baldwin attacked Alexios V. Unable to defeat the Latins, Alexios V sought an alliance with Alexios III and married his daughter, Eudokia Angelina. Alexios III quickly reneged on the alliance however, and had Alexios V blinded. Soon thereafter, the Latins captured Mosynopolis and Alexios V, who was executed in Constantinople. Alexios III fled further into Greece.

After defeating the two Alexioi, the Latin army advanced towards Thessalonica. Boniface, fearing that Baldwin was ignoring his promise, attacked Baldwin's forces near Adrianople. After the intervention of both other Crusaders and the Venetians, Boniface agreed to leave Baldwin's imperial domains and sell Crete to Venice, in return being allowed to go on and occupy Thessalonica on his own. Thessalonica was captured towards the end of the summer of 1204 and Boniface proceeded to campaign further into Greece, enforcing the claims of the Crusaders. Boniface's task was made easier through his marriage to Margaret of Hungary, the widow of Emperor Isaac II. Because the Byzantine populace acknowledged her as a member of the former ruling class, Margaret's new husband could be accepted as a continuation of imperial authority.

Boniface was accompanied by several Byzantine nobles, including Michael Komnenos Doukas, a cousin of Alexios III. In early autumn, Michael was called on by his relative Senachereim, who had served as the imperial governor of Epirus, for aid. Michael left Boniface and travelled to Epirus. Senachereim died before he arrived and Michael took up residence in Arta and organized local resistance against the Latins. Soon, he established control of a realm stretching from Nafpaktos to near Dyrrachium. This land had been promised to Venice in the Partitio, though the Venetians had little interest in the mountainous interior. Michael at no point used a ruling title but is referred to as a despot in later sources; historians thus often refer to his state as the 'Despotate of Epirus'. To protect his realm, Michael nominally submitted to the Roman Catholic Church. Meanwhile, Alexios III was welcomed by Leo Sgouros in southern Greece. Eudokia was married again, to Sgouros, though this new alliance had little time to manifest before Boniface reached them in Thessaly. Sgouros fled to the Peloponnese and was besieged at the Acrocorinth while Alexios III was captured by the Latins. In 1205, Boniface conquered central Greece, Euboea, and much of the eastern Peloponnese.

Prominent Byzantine political leaders 1204–1205

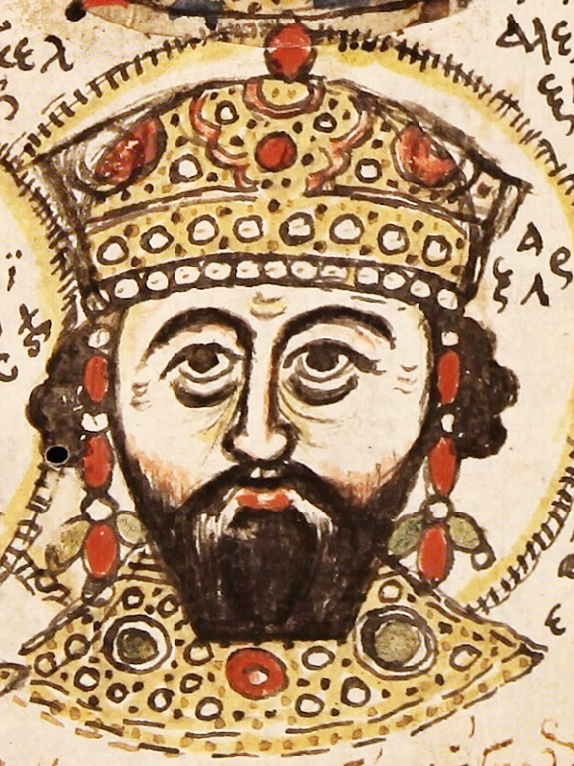
Alexios III Angelos, former emperor

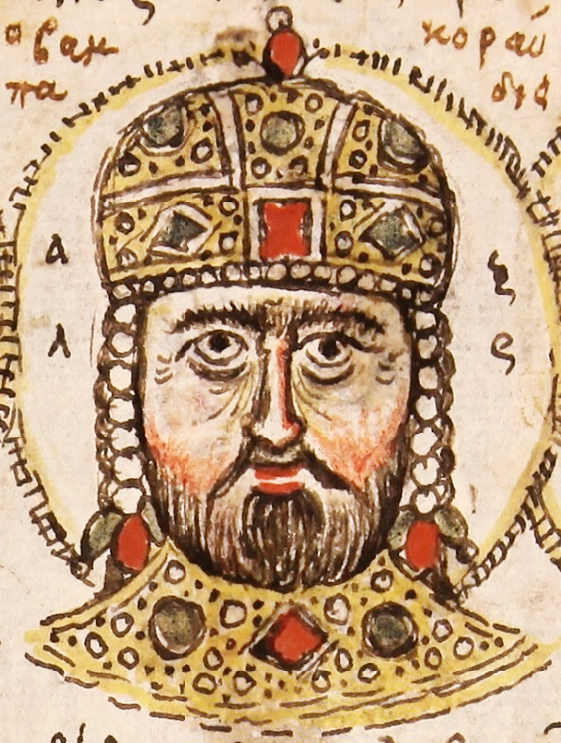
Alexios V Doukas, former emperor

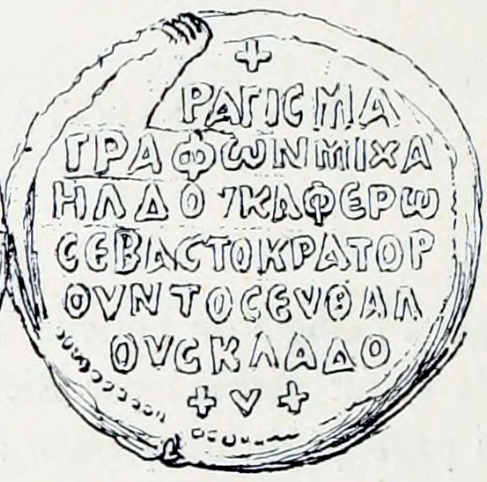
Michael Komnenos Doukas, warlord in Epirus

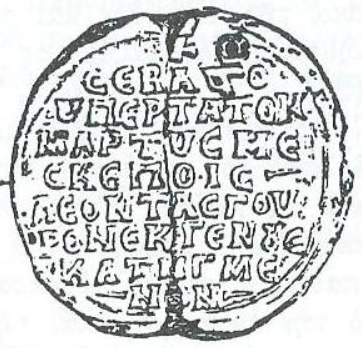
Leo Sgouros, warlord in central Greece

As the Latin Empire's European side was becoming secured, the Latins also struck into Anatolia to enforce Baldwin's claims there. The campaign was led by Baldwin's brother, Henry of Flanders, as well as Louis of Blois, who had been promised the title 'Duke of Nicaea'. On 6 December 1204 the Latins defeated Theodore Laskaris, who professed loyalty to Alxios III, near Poemanenum and besieged Prusa. The defeat led to much of Bithynia falling into Latin hands. Laskaris's position was rendered even worse by Alexios Komnenos of Trebizond sending his brother, David Komnenos, with an army to capture coastal Paphlagonia. In early 1205, Henry returned to Anatolia with reinforcements, capturing Adramyttium and defeating Theodore Mangaphas.

The Byzantine aristocracy in Thrace had initially been prepared to recognize Latin rule, though the Latin regime did not wish to accommodate them. Kaloyan, tsar of the Second Bulgarian Empire, had in reaction to the Latin successes approached Pope Innocent III, offering to accept the Catholic Church in return for a papal coronation. As a Catholic ruler, Kaloyan also approached Baldwin with the prospect of an alliance. Baldwin rejected Kaloyan's offer due to the Bulgarians occupying some border regions in Thrace. In 1205, the Byzantine aristocracy and populace of Thrace rebelled against the Latins and summoned Kaloyan to their aid, possibly promising to proclaim him emperor. Latin garrisons were expelled and massacred in numerous settlements, including Adrianople and Didymoteicho. Baldwin responded by besieging Adrianople but Kaloyan inflicted a crushing defeat on the Latin army at the Battle of Adrianople on 14 April. Many knights and generals were killed, including Louis of Blois, and Baldwin himself was taken prisoner. The defeat threatened the Latin Empire with complete collapse merely a year after its foundation. Baldwin's brother Henry was forced to abandon his campaign in Anatolia in order to rush back to Constantinople to serve as regent.

=== New balance of power (1205–1209) ===
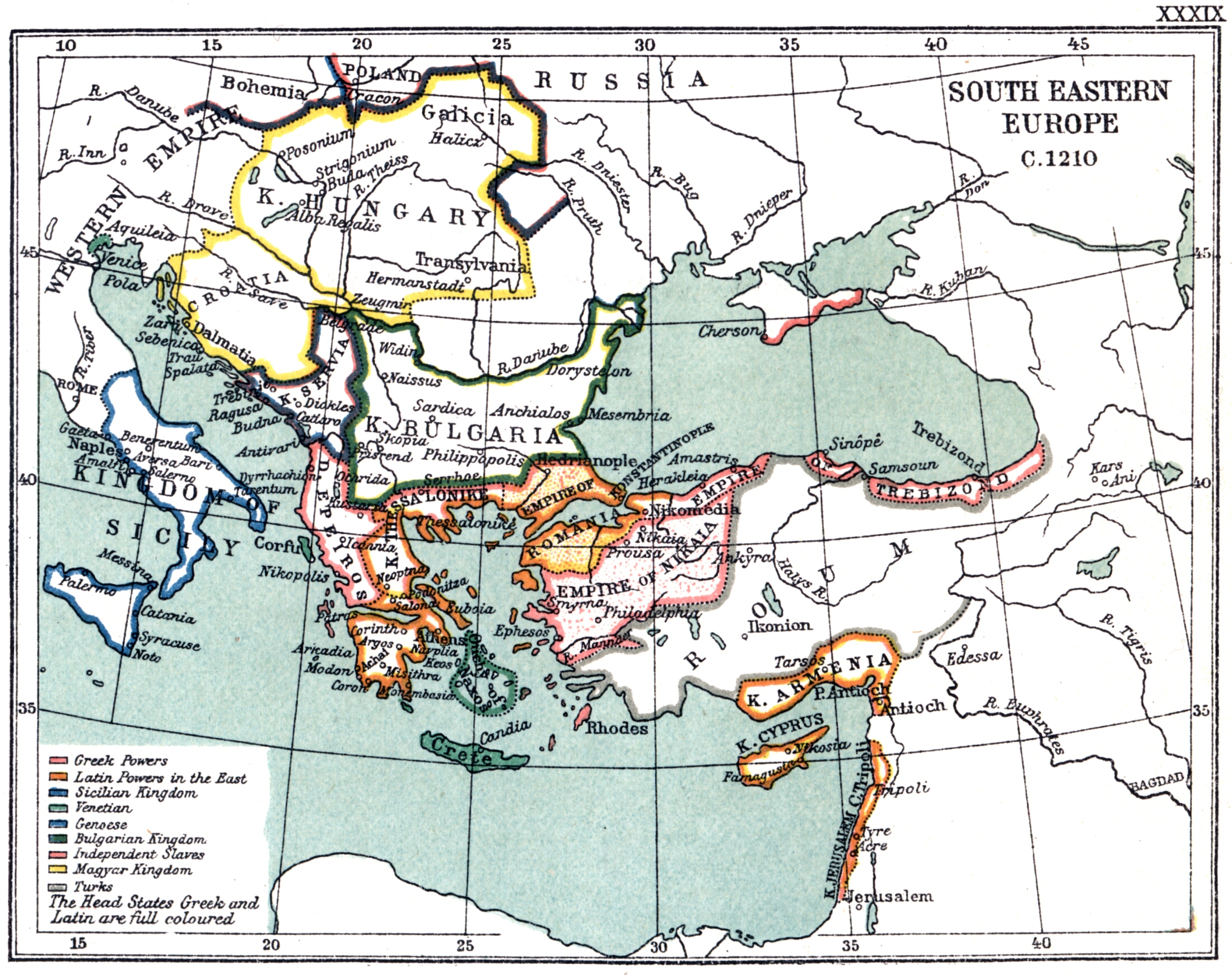
Political map of southeastern Europe c. 1210

The unexpected Latin defeat at Adrianople saved Theodore Laskaris from certain disaster. Henry's return to Constantinople led to most of his gains in Anatolia being abandoned to Laskaris, who also managed to defeat an army sent by David Komnenos. Laskaris also captured Theodore Mangaphas, defeated by Henry a few months prior. After this string of successes, Laskaris, who up until then had used the title despot, proclaimed himself as the rightful Byzantine emperor at Nicaea, establishing what historians refer to as the 'Empire of Nicaea'. The assumption of the imperial title was a challenge to the authority of Emperor Henry in Constantinople, who regarded him as unlawful usurper. Later in 1205, Laskaris campaigned in the south and defeated his remaining rivals there, Sabas Asidenos and Manuel Maurozomes. Maurozomes and Laskaris made peace in early 1206, with Maurozomes being allowed to keep the border forts of Chonae and Laodicea as a vassal of Kaykhusraw I, Sultan of Rum. In order to legitimize his claim to be emperor, Laskaris tried to invite the exiled Orthodox Patriarch of Constantinople, John X Kamateros, to Nicaea. John resided in the rebel-held parts of Thrace but refused to desert his countrymen there and died in the spring of 1206. Laskaris also sent letters to Pope Innocent III, trying to persuade the pope to authorize Orthodox clerics to elect a new Orthodox patriarch and to acknowledge Laskaris as the supreme head of the Orthodox community, though the pope ignored both requests.

After his victory at Adrianople, Kaloyan attacked Boniface's Kingdom of Thessalonica, capturing and sacking Serres. Later, the same fate had the city of Philippopolis. Because Kaloyan at times mistreated and fought his Byzantine allies, the Latins under Henry were able to reverse some of his gains in Thrace. In the spring of 1206, Kaloyan conducted a brutal raid of Thrace, styling himself as "the Roman-slayer" in imitation of the Byzantine emperor Basil II (r. 976–1025, who had been called "the Bulgar-slayer"). The Byzantine rebels, formerly Kaloyan's allies, sought the aid of Henry and surrendered Adrianople to Theodore Branas, a Byzantine general in Latin service. The Latins were then able to retake most of Thrace. After learning that Baldwin had died in Bulgarian captivity, Henry was crowned as the new Latin emperor on 20 August 1206.

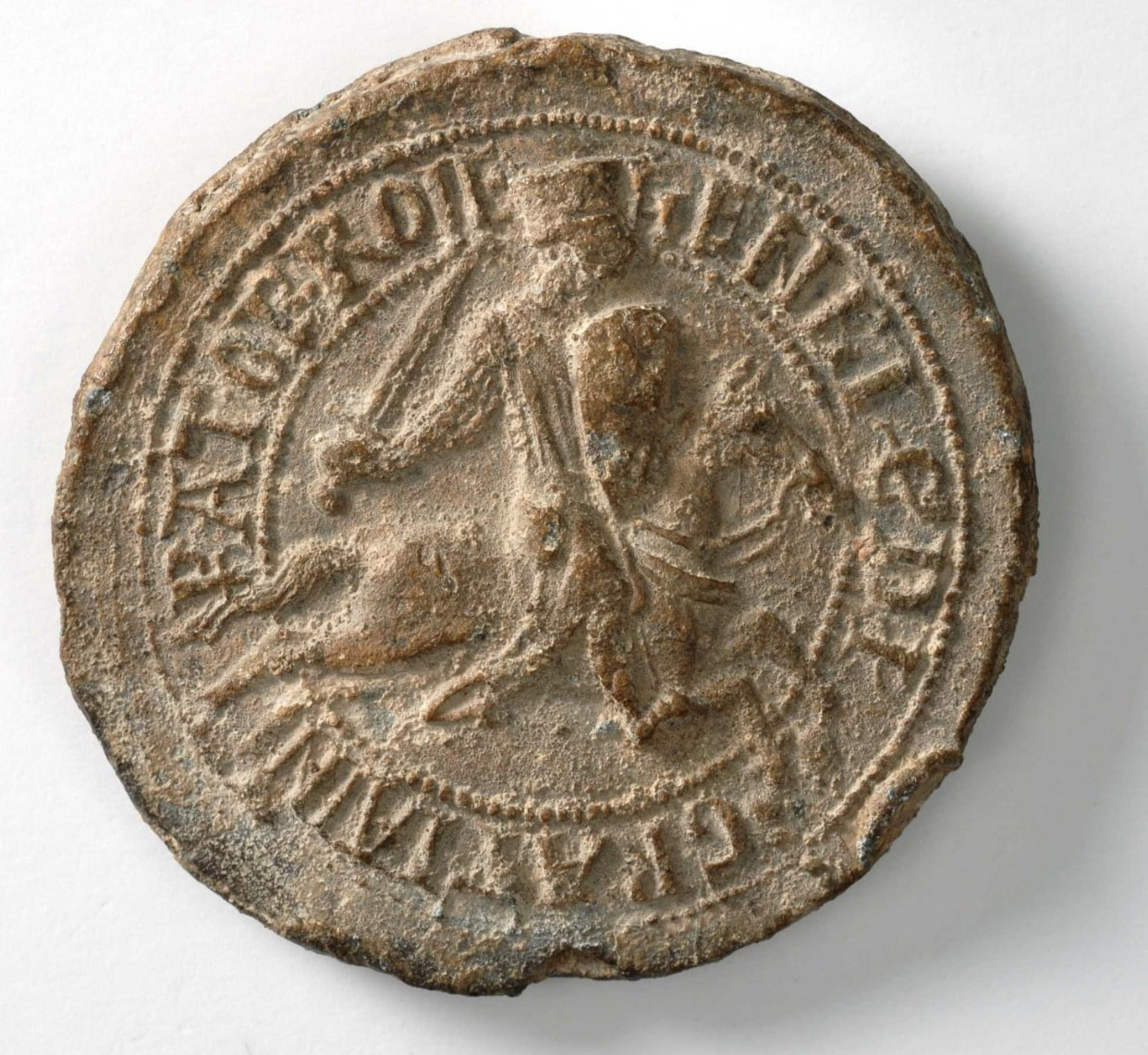
Seal of Henry of Flanders, Latin Emperor of Constantinople 1206–1216

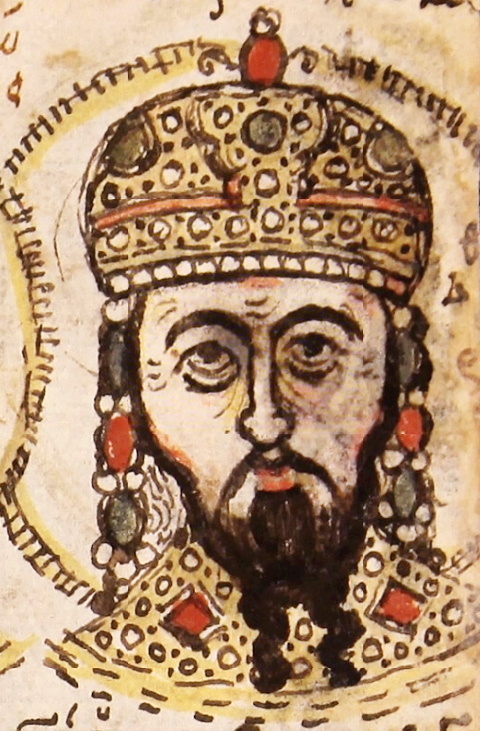
Theodore Laskaris, Emperor at Nicaea 1205/1208–1221

As the new emperor, Henry tried to restrain Theodore Laskaris by allying with David Komnenos. When Larkaris marched to seize David's capital, Heraclea Pontica, the Latins attacked his forces in the rear and forced him to turn back. In the winter of 1206, the Latins once again invaded Laskaris's lands, capturing Nicomedia and Cyzicus. Laskaris retaliated by communicating with Kaloyan. In the spring of 1207, Henry had to withdraw his troops from Anatolia again in order to stop a Bulgarian attack on Adrianople. In order to secure a truce, Henry returned Nicomedia and Cyzicus to Laskaris and agreed to an armistice lasting two years. In 1208, Laskaris appointed his own nominal Patriarch of Constantinople in Nicaea, Michael IV Autoreianos, who officially crowned him as 'Emperor and Autocrat of the Romans'. The appointment and coronation were controversial, since only a lawful emperor could appoint a legitimate patriarch and only a legitimate patriarch could crown a lawful emperor. As such, the status of both was questionable, especially since Laskaris did not hold Constantinople.

By 1207, the major combatants were starting to become exhausted. In late summer, the Bulgarians ambushed and killed Boniface of Montferrat and Kaloyan besieged Thessalonica. Kaloyan died in October, during the siege. Both Boniface and Kaloyan left only underage heirs to succeed them and their realms became politically incapacited. Power was seized in Thessalonica by a group of rebellious Latin barons and the Bulgarian throne was usurped by Kaloyan's nephew, Boril. In early 1208, Leo Sgouros, still besieged in the Acrocorinth, committed suicide by riding his horse off a cliff. Attaleia, still held by Aldobrandini, was captured by Sultan Kaykhusraw. Venice completed its conquest of the Aegean islands, except for Crete which had been captured by the Republic of Genoa. In the summer, Henry defeated a raid by Boril, captured Philippopolis, and marched on the rebel barons of Thessalonica. Thessalonica was retaken in early 1209 and Henry installed his brother Eustace as regent for Boniface's son Demetrius, ruling together with Demetrius's mother, Margaret of Hungary. Henry then received homage from the Latin vassals throughout Greece. Michael of Epirus married his daughter to Eustace and made a formal submission to Henry in order to avoid invasion from the resurgent Latin Empire.

== Struggle for supremacy (1209–1248) ==
=== Stabilization of resistance (1209–1216) ===
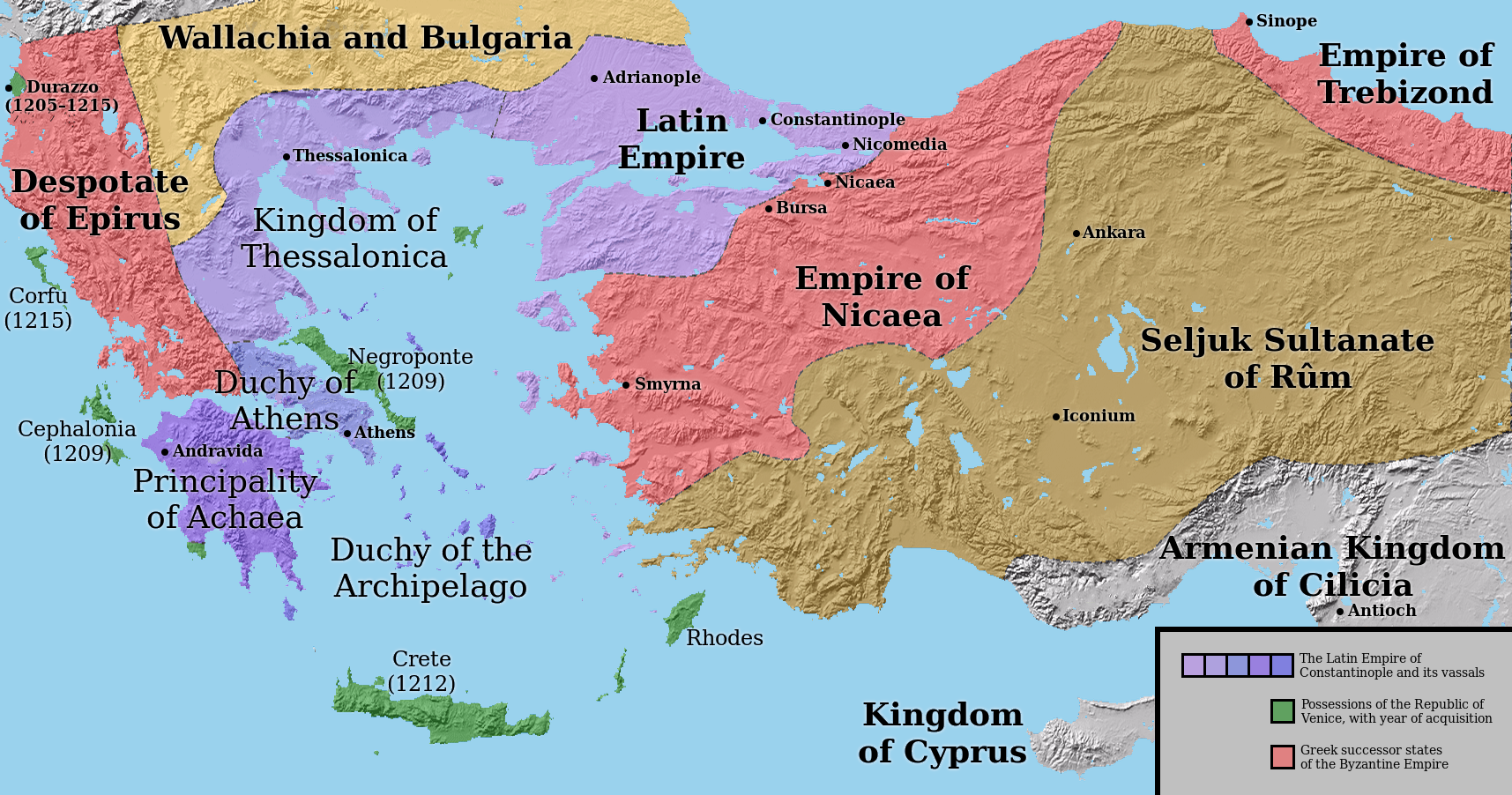
Another map of borders c. 1210

When their armistice expired in 1209, Henry returned to fighting against Theodore Laskaris. As part of the struggle, the Latin Empire concluded a secret alliance with Sultan Kaykhusraw. The establishment of a Byzantine center of power in Nicaea had intensified the long-running Byzantine–Seljuk conflict, with the Empire of Nicaea having become a new major obstacle for westward Seljuk expansion. Michael of Epirus paid the Latin regime a ransom for his cousin, Alexios III, and sent the former emperor to Kaykhusraw. Kaykhusraw could use Alexios to disguise his plans for conquest under a veneer of legitimacy, demanding that Laskaris abdicate in favor of the "more legitimate" emperor. Michael took part in the scheme only to diminish Laskaris's position in favor of his own, not to demonstrate loyalty to the Latins. In 1210, Michael invaded the Kingdom of Thessalonica and captured Thessaly. For this he was excommunicated by Pope Innocent III, ending Epirus's nominal adherence to Catholicism. To protect himself, Michael accepted Venetian suzerainty, though most of Venice's forces were busy capturing Crete from the Genoese. Henry defeated Michael in Thessaly and he was made a Latin vassal again.

To rival the Latin–Seljuk alliance, Laskaris allied with Boril in Bulgaria, though Henry defeated a Bulgarian force attacking the Kingdom of Thessalonica. Laskaris had to postpone his plans of a naval attack on Constantinople to counteract the threat posed by Kaykhusraw. With a force of two thousand soldiers, out of which 800 were Latin mercenaries, Laskaris was victorious against Rum in the Battle of Antioch on the Meander in late spring 1211. Kaykhusraw was killed in battle and Alexios III was captured and then forced to live out his life in a monastery. Peace was forged between Nicaea and Rum, now ruled by Kaykhusraw's son Kaykaus I. The victory was followed by defeat against the Latins as Henry defeated Laskaris in the Battle of the Rhyndacus on 15 October 1211. The Latins could occupy the northwestern corner of Anatolia, though both empires were exhausted on manpower. In either 1212 of 1214, the Latin Empire and Nicaea signed the Treaty of Nymphaeum, in which the Latins were allowed to retain northwestern Anatolia as far as Adramyttium in the south, the rest being left to Nicaea. The Nicene–Bulgarian alliance came to an end in 1213, when a papal legate managed to forge an alliance between Boril and Henry, who conducted an unsuccessful joint campaign against Stefan Nemanjić of Serbia.

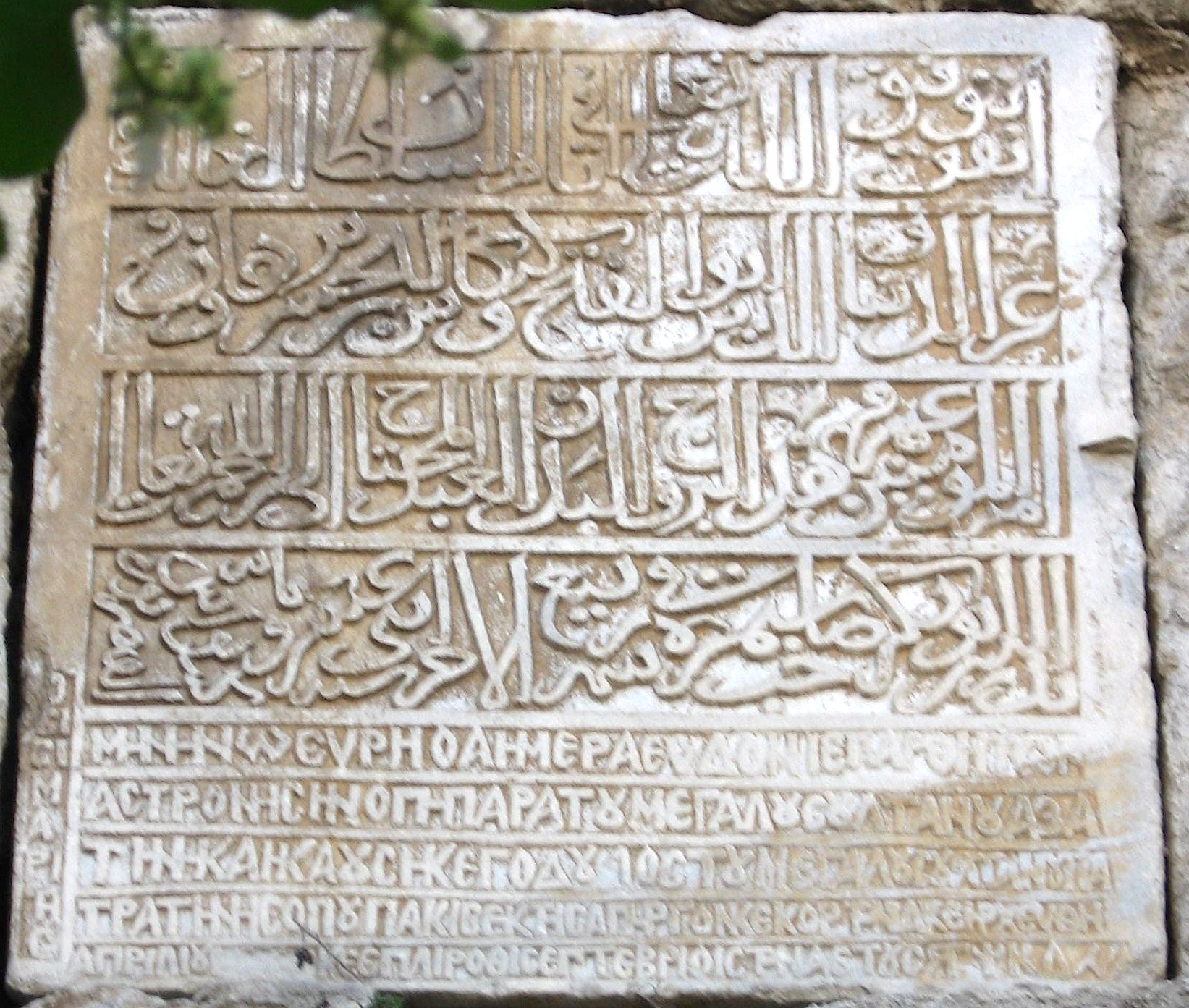
Bilingual inscription of the Seljuk sultan Kaykaus I at Sinope

While the Latins were focused on the Nicenes, Michael of Epirus again expanded his influence. He once more conquered western Thessaly from the Kingdom of Thessalonica and renounced Venetian suzerainty, capturing both Dyrrachium and Corfu from the Venetians in 1213–1214. The Epirote state began to set itself up as an independent Byzantine realm, becoming a center of Byzantine cultural and political tradition similar to Nicaea. In addition to his successful military efforts, Michael became known for his cruelty against the Latins, reportedly executing Latin priests and crucifying a Latin general and his companions. The third Byzantine pretender, Alexios of Trebizond, meanwhile suffered severe setbacks. After recovering from his defeat by the Latins, Laskaris attacked David Komnenos, who was unable to oppose him without Latin support. Laskaris capturing Heraclea Pontica, Amastris, and all of David's other territories, forcing David to flee to Sinope. Sultan Kaykaus took advantage of the situation, capturing Sinope and killing David. When Alexios of Trebizond arrived to retake the city, he was also defeated and captured. In order to secure his freedom, Alexios had to formally surrender Sinope to Kaykaus and agree to become the sultan's vassal. The fall of Sinope diminished Alexios's status as well as the influence of the Empire of Trebizond, which ceased to be a major contender in the Byzantine world.

Around the beginning of 1215, Michael of Epirus was assassinated. He was succeeded in Epirus by his half-brother, Theodore Komnenos Doukas, who after 1204 had spent many years in the Empire of Nicaea and had only returned to Epirus at Michael's request. Theodore taxed his subjects harshly to finance ambitious and successful military campaigns. His first victory came against Boril and Epirus seized Ohrid and much of the Vardar valley from the Bulgarians. Henry resolved to stop the growing Epirote threat and marched against Theodore but died at Thessalonica in the spring of 1216.

=== Rise of Epirus (1216–1225) ===
Emperors of the 1220s

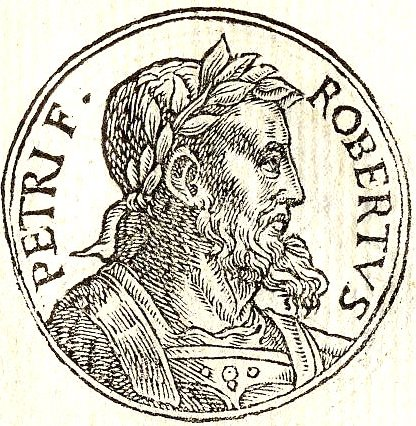
Robert of Courtenay
Latin Emperor of Constantinople 1221–1228

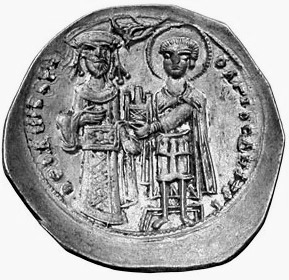
Theodore Komnenos Doukas
Emperor at Thessalonica 1225/1227–1230

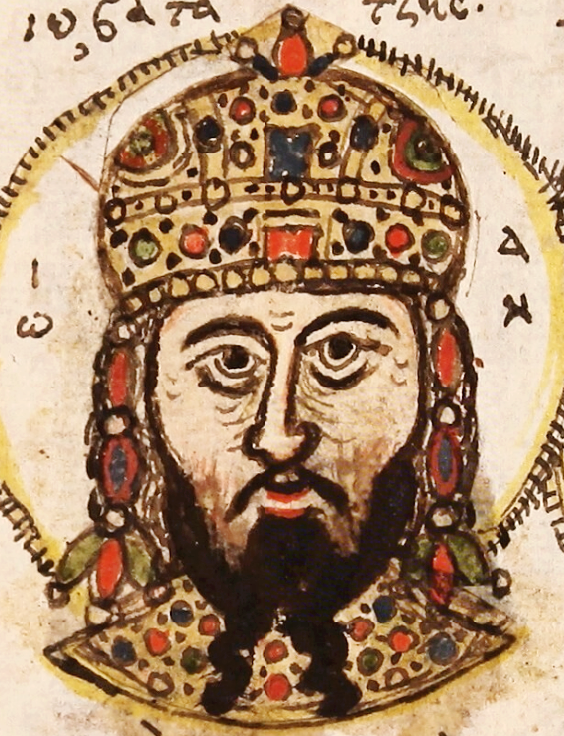
John Doukas Vatatzes
Emperor at Nicaea 1221–1254

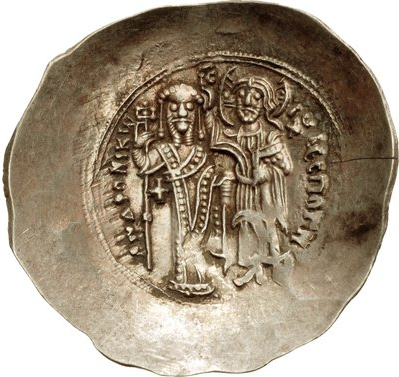
Andronikos Komnenos Gidos
Emperor at Trebizond 1222–1235

The Latin barons of Constantinople elected Peter of Courtenay, husband of Henry's sister Yolanda, as Henry's successor. In France at the time, Peter traveled to Rome and was crowned emperor of Constantinople by Pope Honorius III. The new emperor gathered an army and landed near Dyrrachium in 1217, sending his wife to Constantinople while preparing to wage war on the Epirotes. Peter was almost immediately ambushed and defeated in the Albanian mountain passes by Theodore Komnenos Doukas. Since he is never heard from again, Peter was probably killed. In his place, Yolanda became ruling empress in Constantinople. The Latin Empire was in a precarious position. In 1218, Boril of Bulgaria was overthrown by Ivan Asen II, removing Yolanda's only remaining ally in her immediate surroundings. Peace was maintained with the Empire of Nicaea through the 1219 marriage of Theodore Laskaris to Maria of Courtenay, niece of emperors Baldwin and Henry. Upon Yolanda's death in 1219, the throne was inherited by her young son Robert of Courtenay, who did not arrive in the city until 1221.

Theodore Laskaris died late in the autumn of 1221 and was succeeded as emperor at Nicaea by his son-in-law, John Doukas Vatatzes. John's accession was disputed by Laskaris's brothers, Alexios and Isaac, and he transferred his seat of power south to Nymphaion, further away from the Latin border. In early 1222, Alexios of Trebizond died, the last of the original successors. Alexios was succeeded by his son-in-law, Andronikos Gidos, who continued to rule Trebizond as an isolated Seljuk vassal.

In the west, Theodore of Epirus steadily expanded his realm, focusing his efforts on the Kingdom of Thessalonica. The death of Boniface, weakened Latin leadership, and return of many Latin knights to Western Europe had effectively paralyzed the kingdom. By the early 1220s, Theodore had conquered virtually the entire state, save for Thessalonica itself, which constantly called for aid from Constantinople. In 1223/1224, Emperor Robert divided his forces, sending troops both to relieve Thessalonica and to attack John Doukas Vatatzes of Nicaea. Vatatzes defeated the forces sent against him at the Battle of Poimanenon, a victory which allowed him to push the Latins out of most of Anatolia. Both of his rebel brothers-in-law Alexios and Isaac, who had sided with the Latin army, were captured and blinded. Once the Latin army in the west heard of Vatatzes's victory they abandoned a siege of Epirote-held Serres. Without hope for military aid, the Latins of Thessalonica surrendered their city to Theodore Komnenos Doukas near the end of 1224, bringing an end to the Kingdom of Thessalonica, the most important Latin vassal state. Despite its effects abroad, Vatatzes's victories were not enough to ensure his position domestically. Already in 1225 the emperor had to root out a conspiracy against him, organized by his cousins Andronikos and Isaac Nestongos.

Expansion of the Epirote state, and later the Empire of Thessalonica, 1205–1230

With the capture of Thessalonica, Theodore Komnenos Doukas now held the Byzantine Empire's second most important city and governed a realm that included Epirus, Thessaly, and much of Macedonia, somewhat larger than the Empire of Nicaea. Theodore refused to recognize the religious authority of the patriarch at Nicaea, as well as the imperial titles of John Doukas Vatatzes or Andronikos Gidos. Supported by the Epirote clergy, Theodore reestablished the former Byzantine ecclesiastical administrations in the reconquered territories, though prelates were appointed by provincial synods rather than the permanent synod under the patriarch. At some point in 1225–1227, Theodore assumed the imperial title and was crowned by Demetrios Chomatenos, Archbishop of Ohrid, establishing what historians refer to as the 'Empire of Thessalonica'. Theodore was deemed a usurper by both John Doukas Vatatzes and his patriarch, Germanus II Nauplius. Theodore's supporters could however point to him having been proclaimed emperor through traditional means, and argued that he deserved to be emperor for his virtues and military successes, and through his descent from former emperors. His coronation in opposition to Nicaea was further justified as legitimate since both empires were provisional states created out of "odd circumstances" and the "confusion of the times". The Epirotes argued that the legitimate and real empire would only be reinstated once the Latins were driven from Constantinople and a Byzantine emperor and their patriarch once more held Constantinople.

=== First attempts on Constantinople (1225–1236) ===
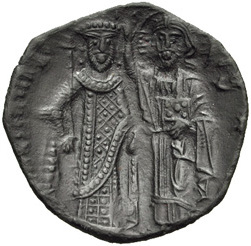
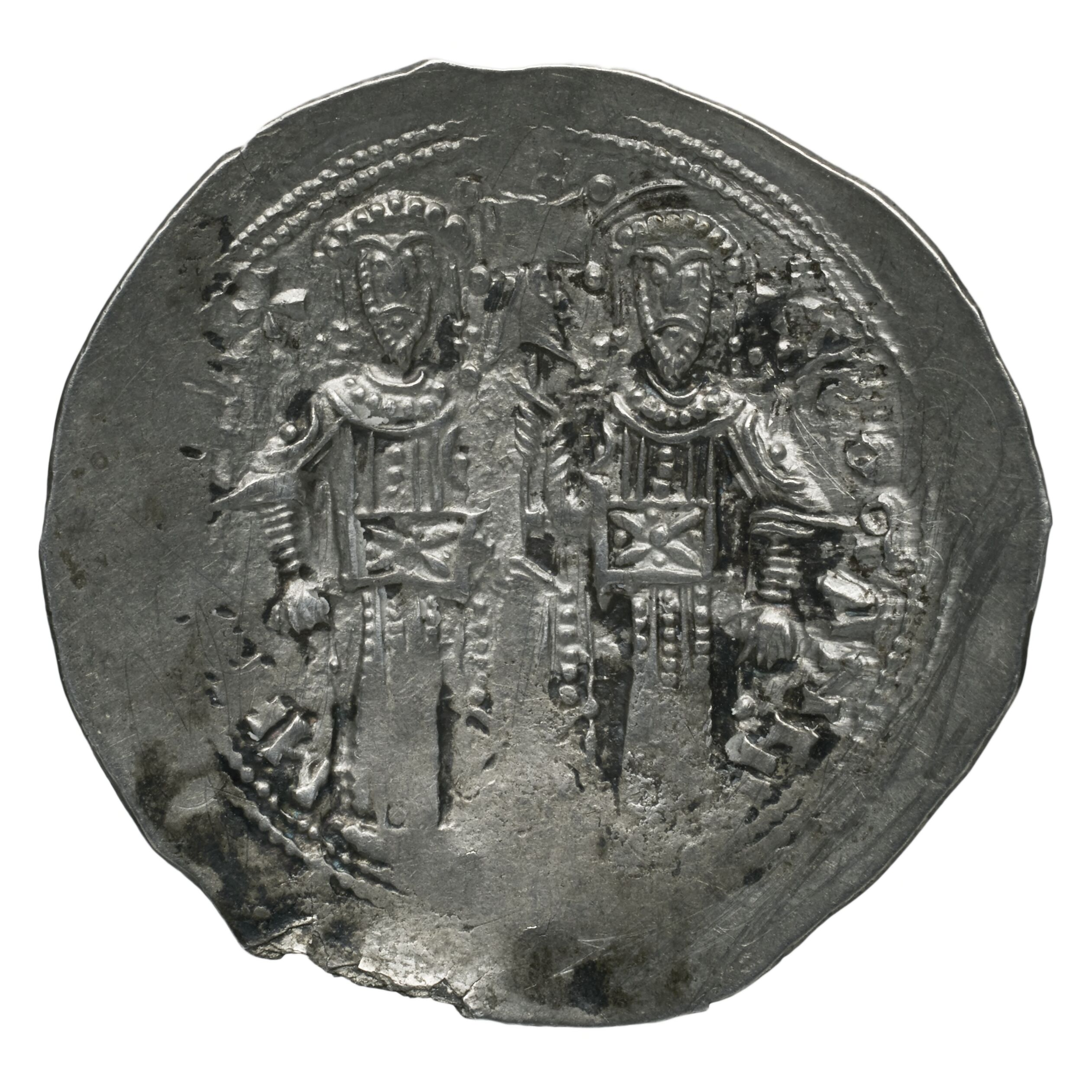
Coinage of the despots that succeeded Theodore Komnenos Doukas: his brother Manuel Doukas in Thessalonica (left) and his nephew Michael II Komnenos Doukas in Epirus (right)

In 1225, the Byzantine people of Adrianople invited John Doukas Vatatzes to liberate their city. A Nicene force successfully captured the city and seized the land between it and the sea. A few months later, Theodore of Thessalonica arrived with a much larger force and the Nicene garrison surrendered Adrianople without fighting. Theodore concluded an alliance with Ivan Asen of Bulgaria through a dynastic marriage and then captured most of the rest of Thrace, reaching the walls of Constantinople. At the height of his power, Theodore aspired not only to take the city, but to restore the entire old empire. His rapid rise caused his rivals to unite against him. Vatatzes began to support the Latin emperor Robert, and Asen also began to open negotiations with the Latins. Threatened with the prospect of a coalition against him, Theodore hesitated to march on Constantinople. In 1228, Robert died and the Latin throne was inherited by his underage brother Baldwin II. Asen warned Theodore to not seize the opportunity to attack Constantinople, since the Bulgarian ruler wished to marry his daughter to the new emperor. In September 1228, Theodore thus concluded a truce with the Latins, establishing commercial relations and a right of return for refugees.

The Bulgarian opposition to an attack on Constantinople ended when the Latin barons of the city shut down the idea of a Bulgarian marriage, fearing that Asen would take control of the empire as Baldwin's father-in-law. Instead, John of Brienne, the aged former king of Jerusalem, was invited to become senior co-emperor. In the spring of 1230, Theodore broke his alliance with Asen and marched up the Maritsa river into Bulgaria, with an army of Byzantines and Latin mercenaries. Theodore likely sought to check Bulgarian power and avoid the threat of a Bulgarian attack in his rear if he were to move on Constantinople. Asen was caught by surprise and hung the text of his broken treaty with Theodore from his standards. On 9 March 1230, the Bulgarians inflicted a crushing defeat on Theodore at the Battle of Klokotnitsa. Theodore himself was taken captive, alongside many of his generals. At some point during his captivity, Theodore was blinded by Asen after being accused of being part of a conspiracy.

The Second Bulgarian Empire under Ivan Asen II, after 1230

The defeat at Klokotnitsa shattered the Empire of Thessalonica. In its place, Bulgaria emerged as the strongest power in the Balkans, taking control over much of Thrace, Macedonia, and Albania. Unlike Kaloyan, Ivan Asen was a milder imperial overlord. Epirus became practically independent under Michael II Komnenos Doukas, illegitimate son of the first Michael of Epirus. Theodore's brother Manuel Doukas escaped Klokotnitsa unharmed and seized power in Thessalonica. Manuel controlled a much reduced domain, effectively being a Bulgarian client ruler, and quickly recognized the imperial authority of Vatatzes and the religious authority of his patriarch in order to "heal the dissension among us Romans". Manuel officially ruled as despot (not emperor) but continued to use 'emperor' in certain documents and to sign his decrees with red ink, an imperial prerogative. In 1231, Ivan Asen challenged the authority of the Byzantine pretenders by taking the title 'Emperor and Autocrat of the Bulgarians and Romans', beginning to aspire to conquer Constantinople and revive the Byzantine Empire under himself.

In 1231, John of Brienne arrived to lead the failing Latin Empire. Vatatzes avoided conflict with Asen and instead focused on expanding his power in other ways. A Seljuk invasion of the Meander valley was defeated, Lesbos, Chios, and Samos were reconquered from the Latins, and Vatatzes aided a revolt by the natives of Crete against the Venetians. Vatatzes also tried to negotiate with Pope Gregory IX, offering to work on reuniting the Catholic and Orthodox churches in return for the surrender of the Latin Empire. Meanwhile, Asen worked on increasing the power and autonomy of the Bulgarian church. Byzantine bishops were replaced with Bulgarians in several cities and attempts were made to integrate Thessalonica and Mount Athos under the Bulgarian church. While Vatatzes fought against Leo Gabalas of Rhodes in 1234, John of Brienne invaded Anatolia. The attack made Vatatzes abandon his negotiations with the papacy and conclude an anti-Latin alliance with Asen in 1235. The alliance was sealed through the marriage of Vatatzes's son, Theodore II Laskaris, and Asen's daughter Elena Asanina. In conjunction with the alliance, Nicene authorities recognized the Bulgarian church leader Joachim I as a patriarch and the Bulgarian church as autocephalous, affirmed by Germanus II of Constantinople (Nicaea), Dorotheus of Antioch, and Nicholas I of Alexandria. Any ties of the Bulgarian church to the papacy were severed and it was firmly placed back in the Orthodox orbit. In return, Asen accepted Germanus II's religious jurisdiction over Thessalonica and Mount Athos.

Asen and Vatatzes agreed to partition Thrace, with Bulgaria to gain the north and Nicaea to gain the south (including Constantinople). In light of the alliance, Patriarch Germanus II preached total war on "the western people" to "send them packing, back to their own countries". Germanus referred to the Byzantines of his time as the "humiliated generation" and publicly encouraged Vatatzes to "rebaptize the Latins in their own blood". In 1235, Bulgaria and Nicaea launched a joint attack on Constantinople. As per their agreement, Nicaea took most of southern Thrace and Bulgaria took the north. Vatatzes and Asen besieged Constantinople together, with Leo Gabalas joining them and commanding a Byzantine fleet. The two were forced to lift the siege due to the arrival of John of Brienne, Geoffrey II of Villehardouin, and a Venetian fleet. In early 1236, another joint siege was attempted, though it too ended in failure.

=== Rise of Nicaea (1236–1248) ===
Emperors of the 1230s

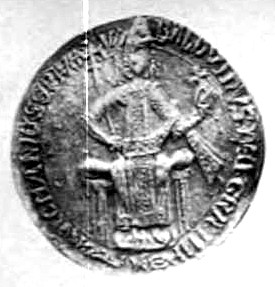
Baldwin II of Courtenay
Latin Emperor of Constantinople 1228–1261

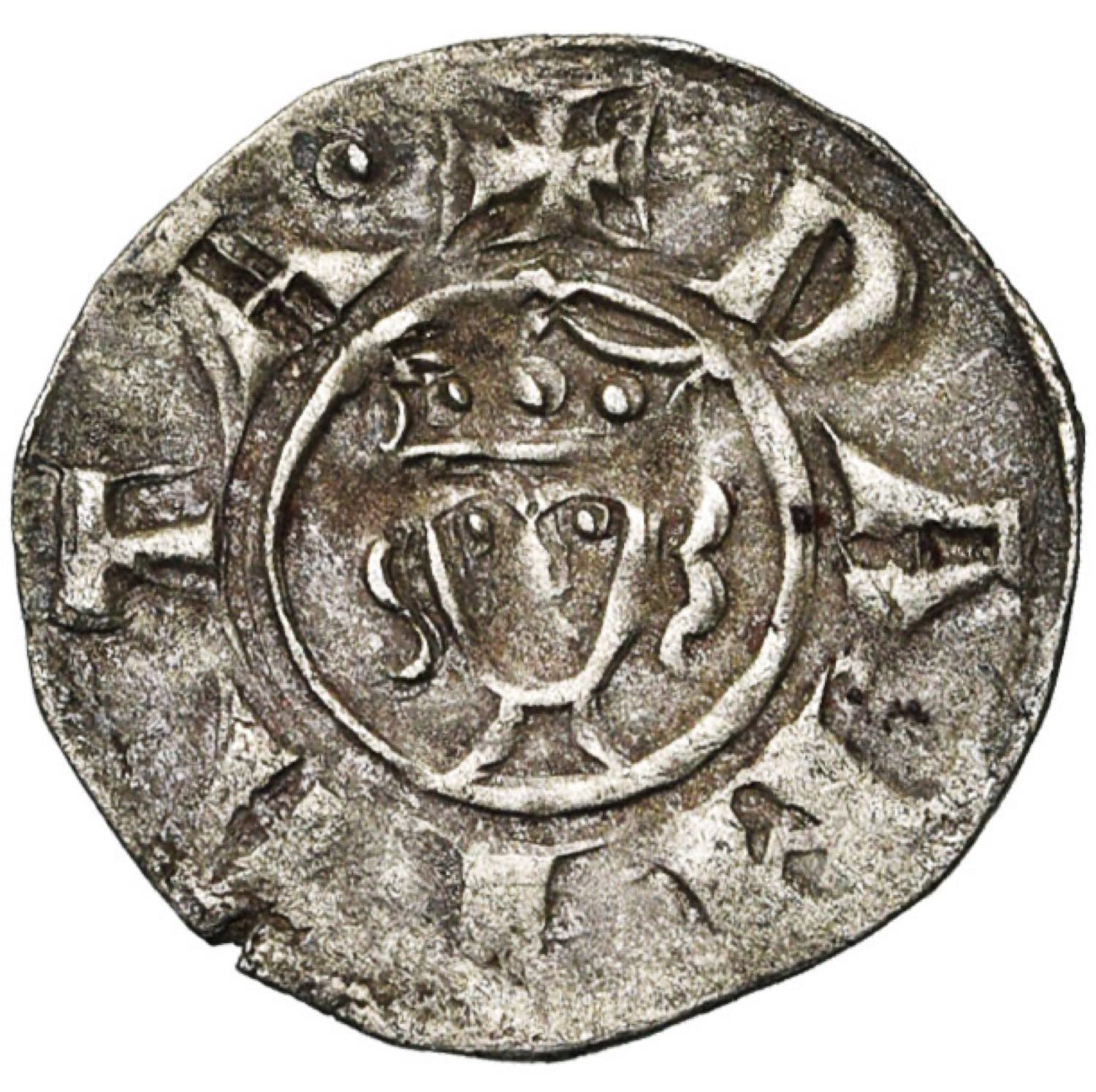
John of Brienne
Latin Co-emperor of Constantinople 1229–1237

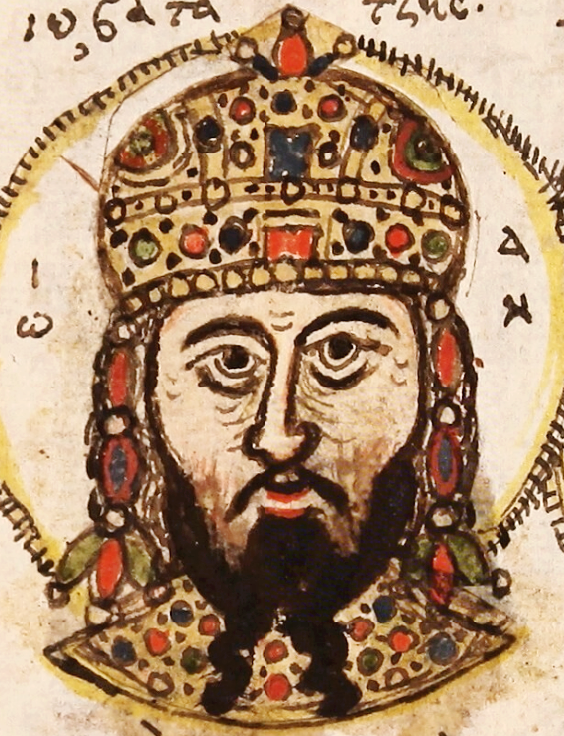
John Doukas Vatatzes
Emperor at Nicaea 1221–1254

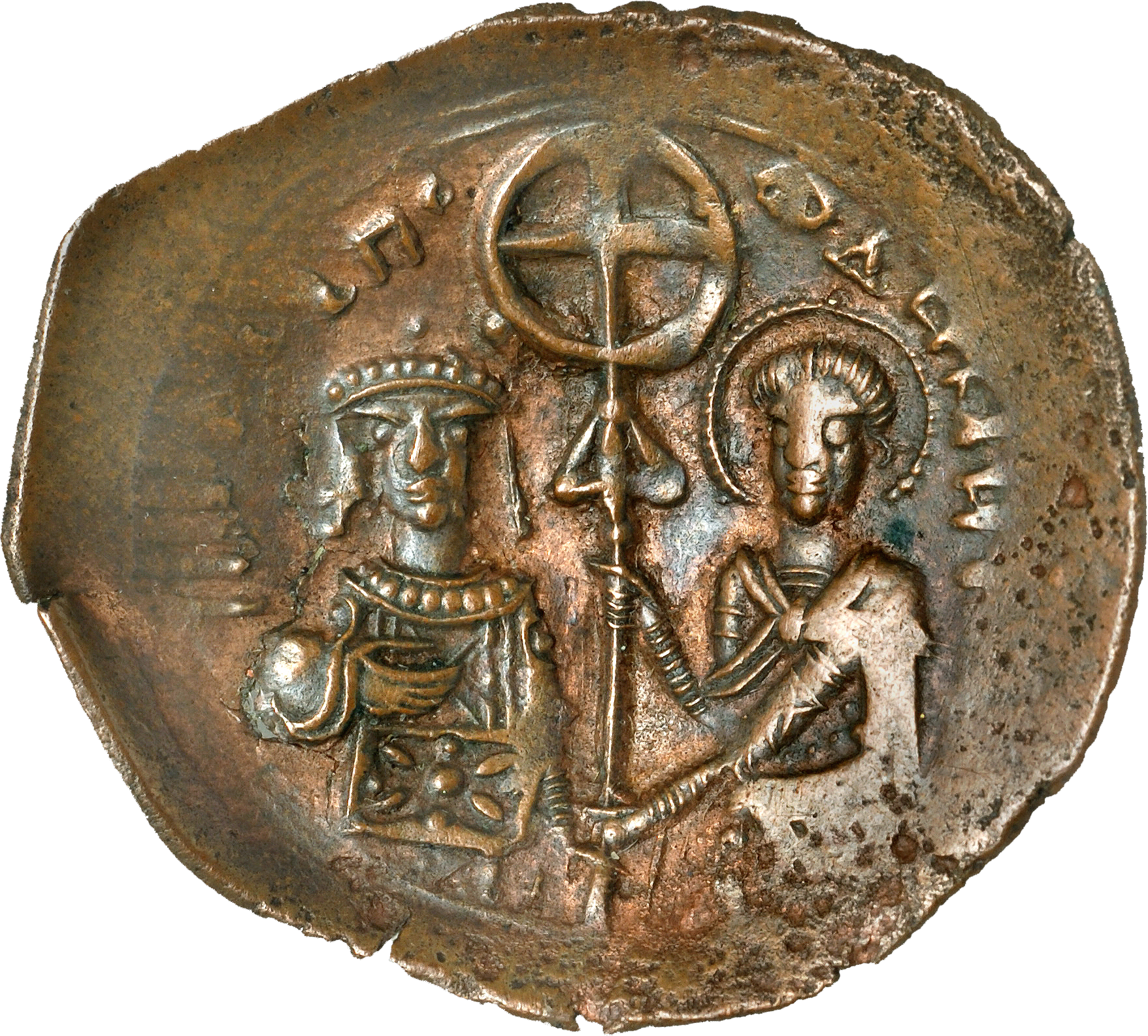
John Komnenos Doukas
Emperor at Thessalonica 1237–1242

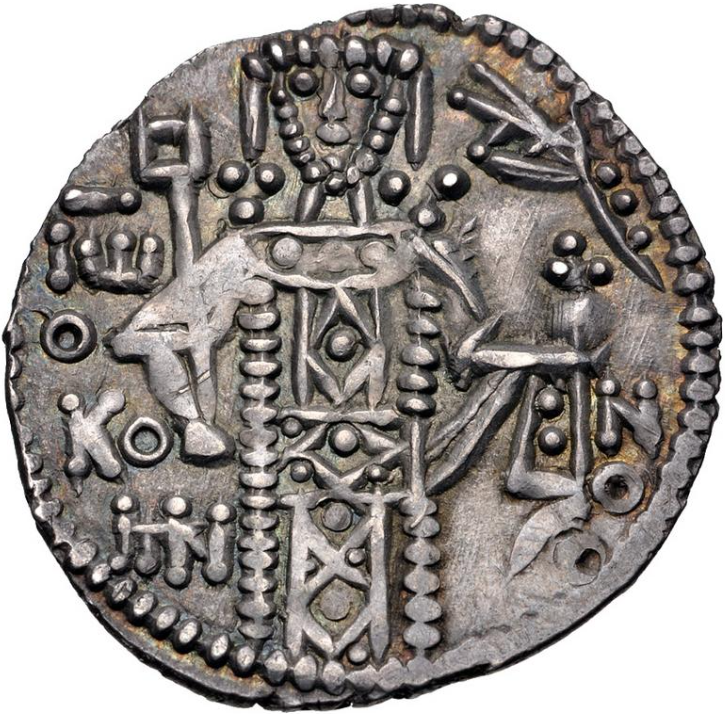
John Komnenos Axouchos
Emperor at Trebizond 1235–1238

John of Brienne died of old age in 1237, at a time when the young Baldwin II was away from Constantinople, traveling through Italy asking for aid. Though another joint attack on Constantinople may have been fruitful, Asen realized that Vatatzes was the chief beneficiary of the Latin Empire's downfall. Perhaps motivated by his own desire to take Constantinople, Asen broke his marriage agreement with Vatatzes, recalling his daughter to Bulgaria. He also made a treaty with the Latins and joined a Latin siege of the Nicene-held Tzurulum. Asen furthermore released the blinded Theodore Komnenos Doukas from captivity and married Theodore's daughter, Irene. Theodore made his way to Thessalonica and organized an uprising against Manuel, who fled to Turkish territory. Since Theodore could no longer officially rule himself, he had his younger son John Komnenos Doukas crowned as emperor in Thessalonica while he himself held the real power form the nearby town of Vodena.

An outbreak of the plague in Bulgaria, which killed both high church officials and several of Asen's immediate family members was interpreted by the Bulgarian emperor as divine wrath for his treachery against the Nicenes. Asen ended his participation in the siege of Tzurulum, returned his daughter to Nicaea, and renewed his alliance. At the same time, Manuel Doukas resurfaced at Nicaea and Vatatzes agreed to help him retake Thessalonica. In early 1239, Manuel and a Nicene force landed in Thessaly, though Theodore stopped the invasion diplomatically by allowing Manuel to govern Thessaly under Thessalonian suzerainty. Later in the same year, Baldwin II returned to Constantinople, backed by an army of French soldiers he had raised through selling a Byzantine relic purported to be the crown of thorns to Louis IX of France. The Latin army, also joined by a force of Cumans fleeing the Mongols, captured Tzurulum from Nicaea in 1240. In retaliation, Vatatzes managed to capture Nicomedia from the Latins in a naval campaign.

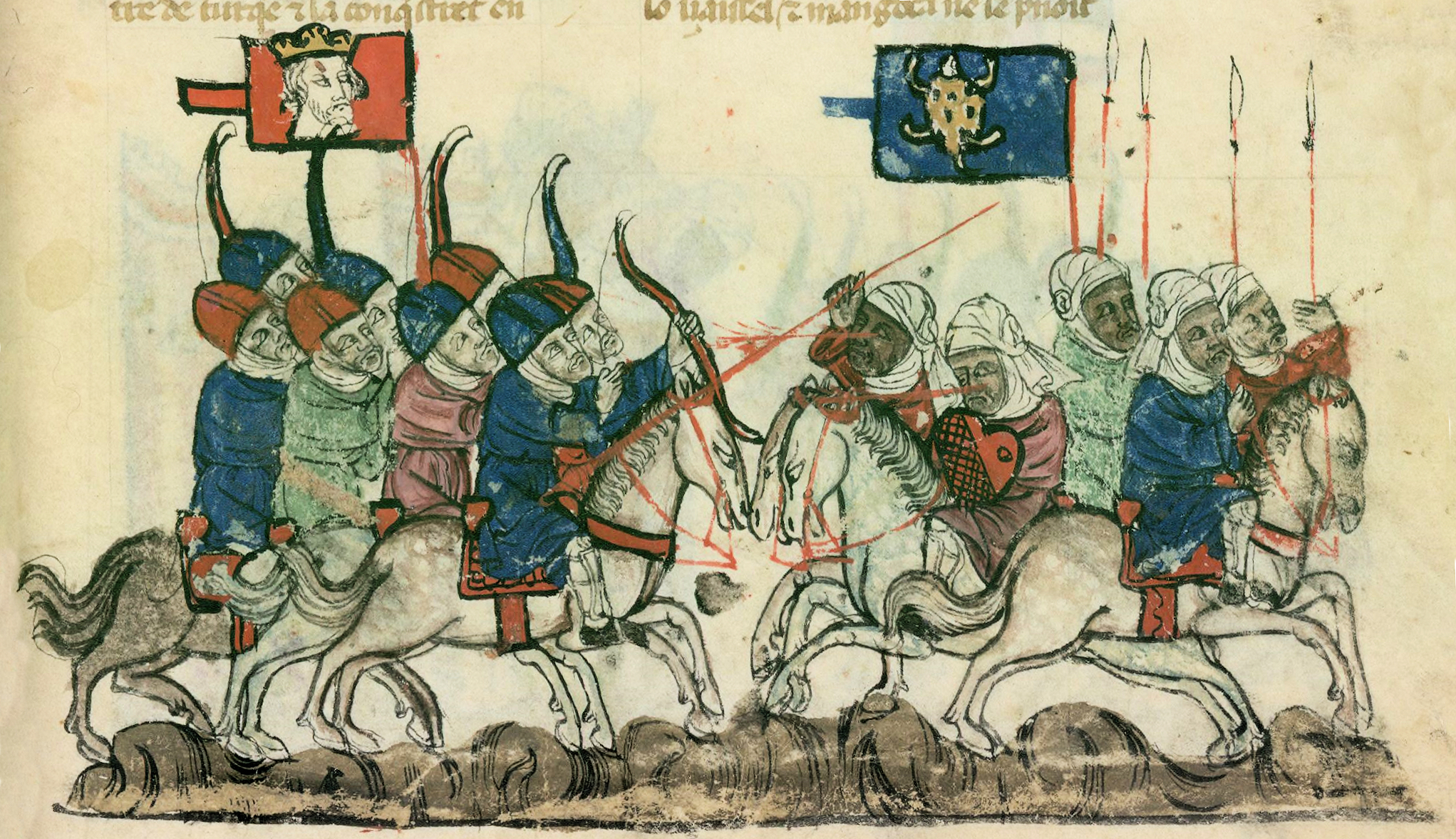
The Battle of Köse Dağ (1243) from Hayton of Corycus's Fleur des histoires d'orient.

Ivan Asen died in 1241 and was succeeded by his young son Kaliman Asen I and a group of regents. The death of its strong leader weakened the Bulgarian Empire, which was already suffering from internal quarrels and external pressure from the Mongols to its north. Ivan Asen's successors ceased to claim to be Byzantine emperors, returning to styling themselves as 'Emperor and Autocrat of the Bulgarians'. The weakening of Bulgaria again strengthened the Komnenoi Doukai in the west. Vatatzes invited Theodore to Nicaea, ostensibly to discuss an anti-Latin alliance, and then imprisoned him. Vatatzes went on to conclude a two-year truce with the Latin Empire and managed to win over its Cuman allies through granting them lands along the Anatolian border. In the spring of 1242, Vatatzes and the Cumans launched an attack on John of Thessalonica and Michael II of Epirus (who now also ruled Thessaly following Manuel's death). Thessalonica was placed under siege, though the siege was interrupted once Vatatzes heard that the Mongols had invaded the Sultanate of Rum. Worried about the prospect of the Mongols reaching his own lands, Vatatzes cut the campaign short. Thessalonica and Epirus were allowed to remain independent, though Vatatzes annexed some Thracian territory and made John give up the title of emperor in favor of despot, nominally under Nicene suzerainty.

Wishing to stop the Mongols from penetrating into Anatolia, Vatatzes concluded an alliance with Sultan Kaykhusraw II of Rum in 1243, promising to send him a detachment of 400 soldiers. In total, Kaykhusraw was joined by 3,000 Christian soldiers, also including forces sent by the Latin Empire and by Manuel Komnenos, the emperor of Trebizond. On 26 June 1243, the Mongols decisively defeated the assembled army at the Battle of Köse Dağ. Both the Sultanate of Rum and the Empire of Trebizond were forced to become tributary vassals to the Mongols. The Empire of Nicaea emerged from the battle unharmed, however, and even benefitted from the weakening of its neighbors after the Mongols were diverted from Anatolia by pressing matters elsewhere.

In the summer of 1246, Kaliman Asen died and was succeeded in Bulgaria by his brother Michael Asen, only a child. Vatatzes broke his treaty with the Bulgarians and captured Serres, whereafter he was able to capture large swaths of territory from the Bulgarians almost unopposed, including cities such as Adrianople and lands all the way to the foothills of the Balkan Mountains. Michael II of Epirus took the chance to capture Ohrid from the Bulgarians. In reaction to Vatatzes's success, the populace of Thessalonica organized a conspiracy in his favor. Vatatzes was able to capture the city without resistance, with the despot Demetrios Angelos Doukas (having succeeded John in 1244) being deposed and exiled to Anatolia. In the spring of 1247, Vatatzes attacked the Latins, their truce having expired, and recaptured Tzurulum. The Nicene emperor now surrounded the capital. In 1248, Michael of Epirus recognized Vatatzes as emperor and was in return formally bestowed with the title of despot. As the Latin Empire was bankrupt and doomed, Pope Innocent IV began to seriously consider Vatatzes's former offer of surrendering the Latin Empire in return for reuniting the churches.

== Fall of the Latin Empire (1248–1261) ==
=== Opposition to Nicene dominance (1248–1259) ===
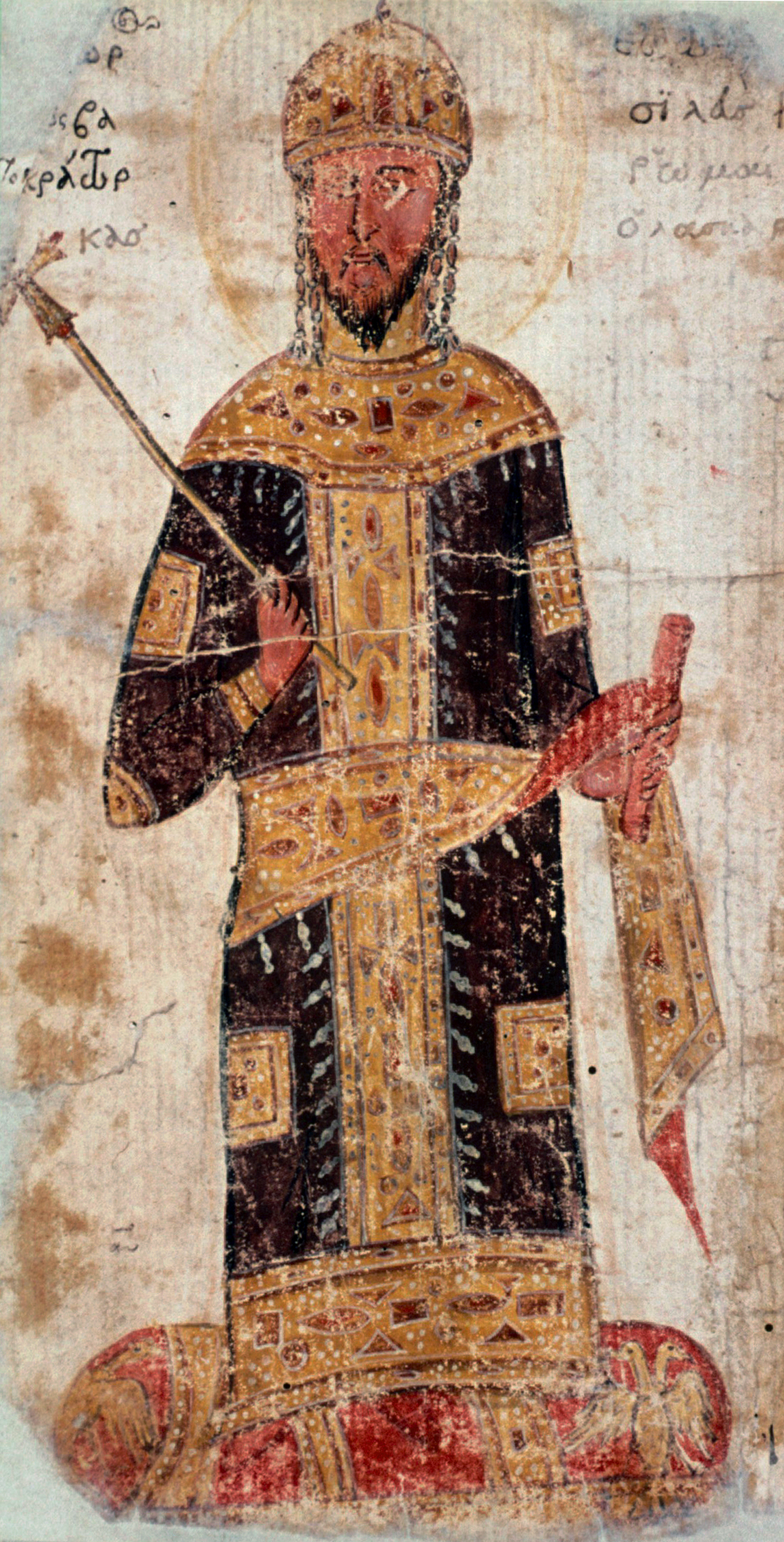
Theodore Doukas Laskaris, Emperor at Nicaea 1254–1258

In late 1251, Theodore Komnenos Doukas launched his last attempt at restoring his empire, conducting a joint campaign against the Nicene holdings in the Balkans with his nephew, Michael II of Epirus. Together, they captured Prilep and marched on Thessalonica. By the end of 1252, they had been defeated and the Vatatzes occupied Kastoria. With the war lost, Michael agreed to accept Nicene suzerainty again, give his son Nikephoros as a hostage, and to cede Prilep, Kastoria, Ohrid, Vodena, as well as the hinterland of Dyrrachium to Vatatzes. Theodore was taken to Nicaea as a prisoner and later died in captivity. The war of 1251–1252 was the final step in the Komnenoi Doukai's reduction into being a minor power. Although Manuel of Trebizond had managed to retake Sinope from the Seljuks in 1254, Trebizond likewise remained a minor power, leaving Nicaea as the foremost Byzantine state.

In the autumn of 1254, John Doukas Vatatzes died and was succeeded by his son, Theodore Doukas Laskaris. The new emperor was challenged by Michael Asen of Bulgaria, who in the beginning of 1255 captured several forts along the northern border. Laskaris led an army to Adrianople and defeated a Bulgarian force near Melnik. In the spring of 1256, the Bulgarians were defeated again and Michael Asen signed a peace treaty, giving up the Byzantine lands the Bulgarians had captured since 1204. Not long after the treaty, Asen was ambushed and killed by a group of his own nobles, angered that he had given up so much land. He was succeeded by his relative Kaliman Asen II, who was also murdered within a year. This extinguished the male line of the Asen dynasty, plunging Bulgaria into a chaotic period of fragmentation and civil war.

Michael of Epirus sought to protect his status through a marriage between his son Nikephoros and Laskaris's daughter Maria. Michael sent his wife Theodora Petraliphaina to negotiate with the Nicene emperor at Thessalonica. Laskaris demanded Dyrrachium and Servia in return for the marriage; scared that she would be imprisoned if she refused, Theodora agreed and Michael surrendered both towns. The wedding took place in the autumn of 1256, whereafter Laskaris returned to Nicaea. The loss of territory angered Michael and in 1257 he supported a rebellion against Laskaris in Albania. The Nicene troops, commanded by George Akropolites, were driven back to Prilep. Laskaris sent Michael Palaiologos, one of his greatest generals, to reassert control but since his loyalty was suspect, Palaiologos did not receive enough reinforcements and was unable to achieve victory. Prilep was captured by Michael of Epirus and Palaiologos was recalled and imprisoned. A new Epirote attempt at recapturing Thessalonica fell through when Epirus was attacked by Manfred, regent of the Kingdom of Sicily, who captured most of Albania as well as the island of Corfu. Michael of Epirus made peace with Manfred to giving him the hand of his daughter Helena in marriage and agreeing to consider Manfred's conquests as her dowry. He also allied with the strongest Latin ruler in Greece, William of Villehardouin of Achaea, through offering his second daughter Anna in marriage. Laskaris countered these new alliances by marrying his daughter Irene to the strongest Bulgarian claimant, Konstantin Tih.

While the war raged on, Laskaris died of epilepsy in the summer of 1258. Nicaea was inherited by his seven-year-old son John Doukas Laskaris, with the grand domestic George Mouzalon appointed as regent. Mouzalon had been one of Laskaris's close friends but was despised by the Nicene aristocracy. Michael Palaiologos, freed from prison, and the nobility had sworn an oath to both the dying emperor and to Mouzalon personally. Despite this, Mouzalon was ambushed during a commemoration service for Laskaris only nine days into the regency and murdered in front of the church altar. In his place, Michael Palaiologos made himself regent with the support of the nobility. At the beginning of 1259, Michael used the supposed state of emergency brought on by the war with Epirus to have himself proclaimed co-emperor.

=== Reconquest of Constantinople (1259–1261) ===
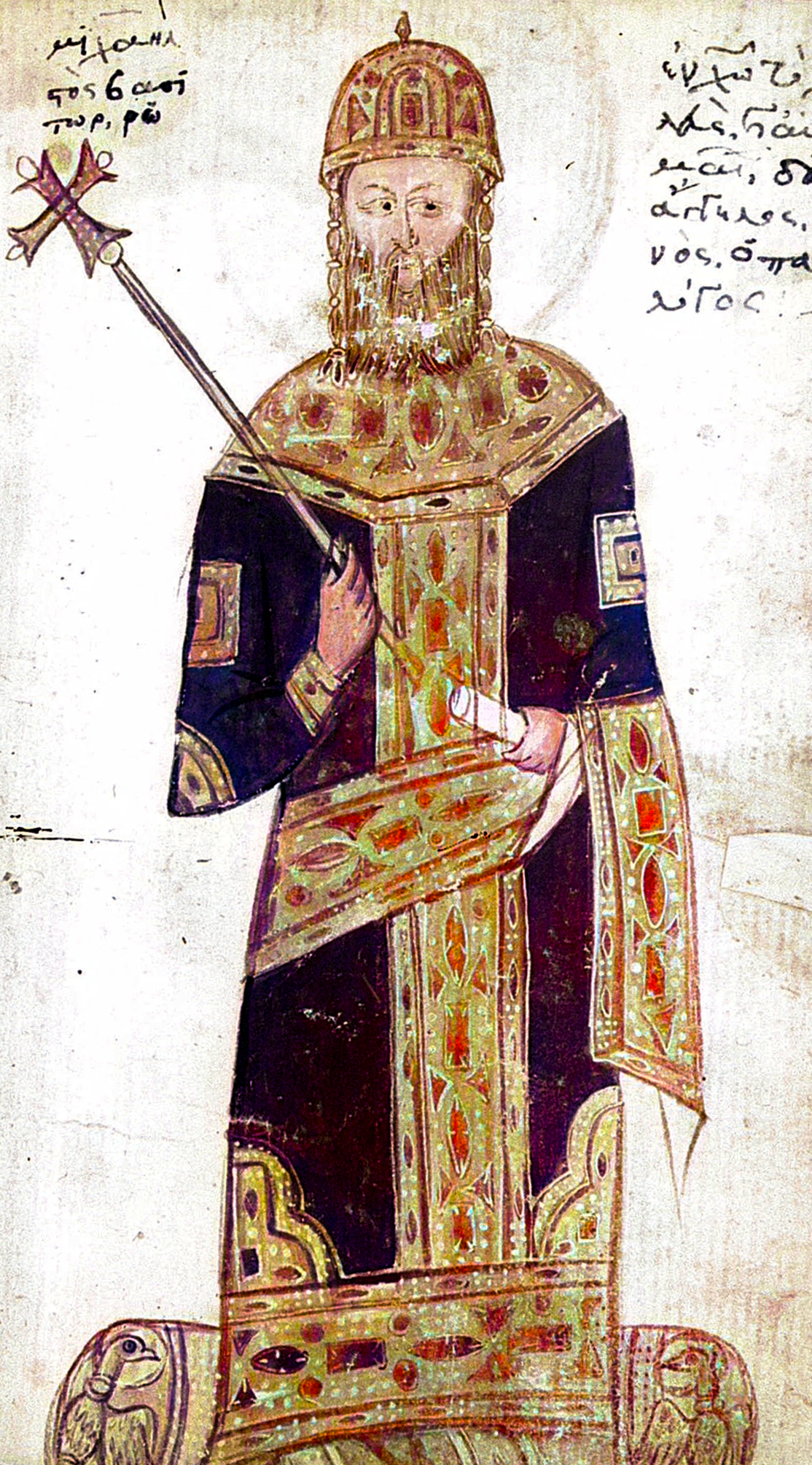
Michael VIII Palaiologos, the first Byzantine emperor to hold Constantinople since 1204

Michael Palaiologos sent his brother John Palaiologos to defeat the Epirote-Latin league. John, promoted to grand domestic and then sebastokrator, routed the Epirote army near Kastoria and captured Ohrid and much of southern Albania from Manfred. In the summer of 1259, Michael of Epirus rallied his own troops and those of Manfred and William and marched to Pelagonia. The alliance soon began to fracture due to internal disputes and Michael of Epirus's illegitimate son John Doukas, who ruled Thessaly, deserted to Palaiologos. John Palaiologos achieved a decisive victory at the Battle of Pelagonia. The Latins and Sicilians were routed, William was captured, and Palaiologos could occupy Thessaly. Palaiologos's second-in-command, Alexios Strategopoulos, went on to capture almost all of Epirus, including its capital of Arta. Michael of Epirus fled to the Latin-held island of Cephalonia, only retaining control of Ioannina and Vonitsa.

With victory almost complete, John Palaiologos was recalled to Nicaea. Michael Palaiologos promoted his brother to despot and began to make plans for the reconquest of Constantinople. In the spring of 1260, Constantinople was put under siege with the help of a Latin baron captured at Pelagonia. Although the Nicenes captured Selymbria and attacked Galata, the city resisted and the Palaiologoi were forced to sign a year's truce with Emperor Baldwin II. Meanwhile, Michael of Epirus retook his mainland possessions, having reconciled with his son John, and invaded Thessaly. John Palaiologos was sent against the Epirotes again. The Epirote invasion was halted, though John was unable to recover Epirus itself.

In 1261, Michael Palaiologos again prepared to take Constantinople. He signed a treaty with Genoa, the main trading competitor of Venice, granting the Genoese large commercial concessions in Nicene ports in return for help in capturing Constantinople. In July, before the truce with Baldwin had expired, Alexios Strategopoulos was sent with a small force of 800 soldiers (mostly Cumans) to gauge the city's defenses. As Strategopoulos closed in on Constantinople he learnt from the local Byzantines that both the Latin army and the Venetian fleet were away from the city, conducting a surprise attack on the Nicene island of Daphnusia. Surprised that the city was defenseless, Strategopoulos took his chance.

In the night of 25 July 1261, Strategopoulos's informants entered Constantinople, killed some Latin guards, and opened the Gate of the Spring. Strategopoulos rode into the city with his small force, taking the Latins by surprise. Baldwin fled by boat alongside many of the Latin barons. The Venetians of Constantinople tried to resist but fled with their families and what property they could carry when Strategopoulos set fire to their commercial quarter. Three weeks after the reconquest, Michael Palaiologos made a triumphant entry into Constantinople and on 15 August had himself crowned emperor in proper Byzantine ceremony in Hagia Sophia.

== Aftermath: Reign of Michael Palaiologos ==
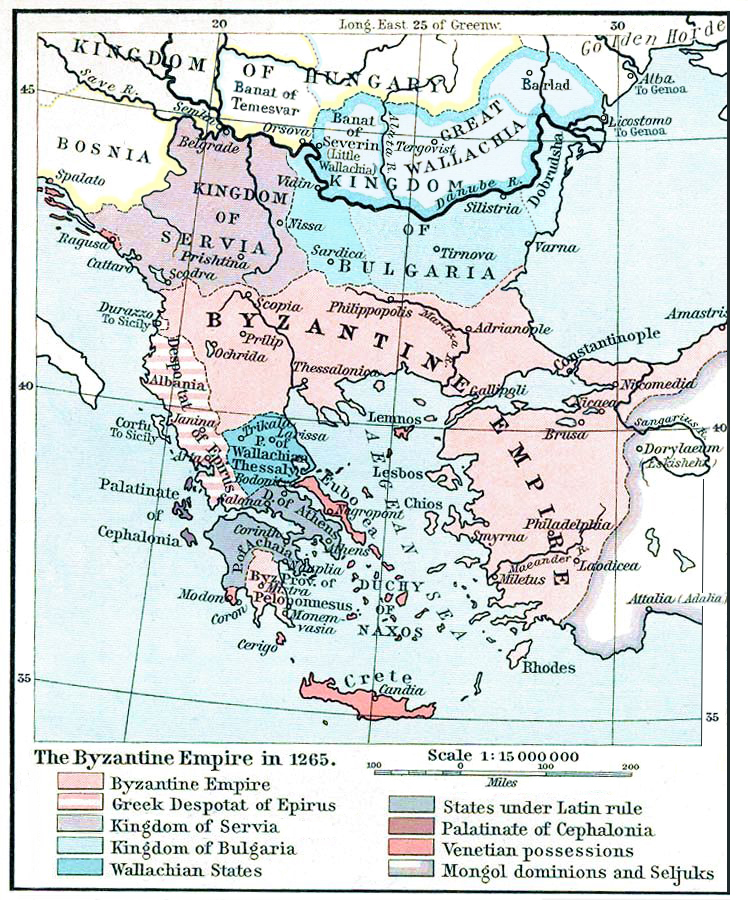
Political map of the Balkans in 1265

Following his coronation in Hagia Sophia, Michael Palaiologos controlled much of the pre-1204 Byzantine Empire, including the old empire's core territory in Thrace and western Anatolia, as well as the two most important cities of Constantinople and Thessalonica. Michael associated his son Andronikos Palaiologos with the throne, ignoring John Doukas Laskaris for whom he was supposed to be regent. On 25 December 1261, the usurpation was completed with the removal and blinding of the young John. When this became public knowledge in early 1262, Patriarch Arsenios Autoreianos excommunicated Michael, preventing the emperor from taking part in any religious services. Modern scholars consider the reconquest of Constantinople as a restoration of the Byzantine Empire, enumerating Michael Palaiologos as Emperor Michael VIII Palaiologos, legitimate successor to the pre-1204 emperors. Because their state retook Constantinople, the emperors at Nicaea are also often retroactively considered the 'legitimate' emperors in the period 1204–1261 (enumerated by historians as Theodore I, John III, Theodore II, and John IV) despite having had their authority widely disputed in their own time. From a more contemporary perspective, the emperors in Thessalonica and Trebizond had been no less legitimate than those in Nicaea. The emperors in Trebizond long refused to recognize Michael Palaiologos as a legitimate emperor and continued to present themselves as the rightful Byzantine emperors until an imperial marriage was arranged in 1282.

Michael Palaiologos was also challenged internationally. The fall of the Latin Empire caused the papacy to lose both prestige and spiritual authority, as the Orthodox church reasserted control in Constantinople. Aware that this could lead to military action against him, Michael had immediately dispatched two ambassadors to Pope Urban IV. Upon reaching Italy, the two were captured and one was flayed alive. In the spring of 1262, Pope Urban organized a joint Venetian-Latin campaign, headed by William of Villehardouin, in the name of the deposed emperor Baldwin. The Byzantines managed to defeat this campaign, as well as a simultaneous Bulgarian invasion of Thrace. Over the course of 1262–1267, Michael stabilized his empire, though was unable to defeat the remaining Latin principalities in southern Greece. He deposed Patriarch Arsenios and the emperor's excommunication was lifted by the new Patriarch Joseph I. Arsenios's deposition divided the clergy into "Arsenites" and "Josephists", beginning the Arsenite schism (1265–1315).

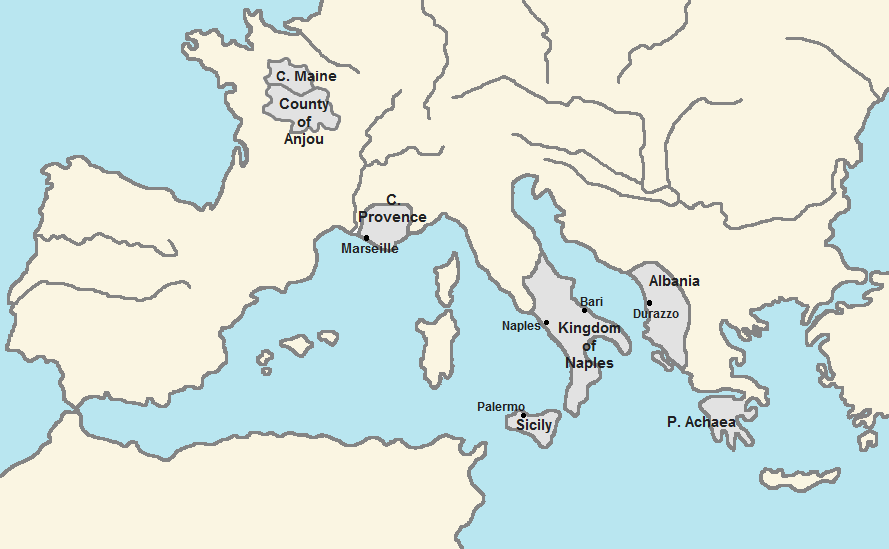
Lands ruled by Charles of Anjou, Michael Palaiologos's foremost Catholic enemy, in the 1270s

The most prominent Catholic figure opposing Michael was the new king of Sicily, Charles of Anjou (r. 1266–1285), who wished to enlarge his lands in Greece. In 1267, Charles married his daughter Beatrice to Baldwin's son Philip and promised to help retake Constantinople in return for the Peloponnese. Michael anticipated an attack and made peace with his neighbors, which included arranging a marriage between Kontantin Tih of Bulgaria and his niece Maria Palaiologina Kantakouzene and the promise of giving the Bulgarians Mesembria and Anchialos if this marriage produced children. Charles allied with Hungary and Serbia and openly planned a crusade against Michael. In the early 1270s, Charles occupied almost all of Albania and managed to gain the allegiance of John Doukas of Thessaly, as well as Konstantin Tih, who had sired a son with Maria without receiving the promised territories from Michael. The threat of a crusade was nullified through the Second Council of Lyon (1272–1274), at which the Byzantine delegation agreed to a reunion of the churches. Although a diplomatic triumph, the church union was unpopular in much of Byzantium and was rejected by almost all Orthodox Christians outside the empire, including the rulers of Trebizond, Epirus, and Thessaly.

In Thessaly, John Doukas held an anti-unionist church council. In Bulgaria, Maria seized power as her husband had become paralyzed and ordered an attack on the Byzantine Empire. In response to the opposition against him, Michael ceased to recognize Nikephoros (who inherited Epirus in 1266) as a legitimate ruler and named his brother Demetrios as the rightful ruler of Epirus. Nikephoros held onto power by becoming a vassal of Charles of Anjou in 1279, choosing Latin vassalage over recognizing the church union. The Bulgarian invasion was defeated and Michael's forces seized Tarnovo and proclaimed Ivan Asen III, a matrilineal grandson of Ivan Asen II, as tsar. Asen was deposed within a year by George Terter I, who due to internal revolts and Mongol threats was unable to offer any opposition to Byzantium.

In 1281, Michael's forces recovered much of Albania from Charles. The new pope, Martin IV, declared that Michael had failed to achieve a true union of the churches, allowing Charles to again plan a crusade. In the summer, Charles recruited the Venetians and Philip of Courtenay, heir to the Latin Empire, and in the fall, Martin excommunicated Michael. The idea of a crusade again led to nothing as Michael helped to finance a revolt against Charles in the spring of 1282. The resulting Sicilian Vespers crippled Charles's power and forced him to abandon his plans. In the same year, Michael achieved recognition by the emperor of Trebizond, John Megas Komnenos, as the legitimate Byzantine emperor, with the rulers of Trebizond instead beginning to style themselves as the "emperors of the east". Michael died in the autumn of 1282, having rebuilt Byzantium as an empire able to hold its own against its enemies. Michael's family, the Palaiologos dynasty, ruled the Byzantine Empire until its ultimate fall in 1453, becoming the empire's longest-lived ruling family.

== Byzantine rulers family tree, 1081–1261 ==
Simplified family tree of the Byzantine rulers of Nicaea, Epirus, Trebizond, and Thessalonica until 1261
Byzantine emperor
Despot of Epirus/Emperor of Thessalonica
Emperor of Nicaea
Emperor of Trebizond

Alexios I Komnenos; 1081–1118
Constantine Angelos	Theodora Komnene	John II Komnenos; 1118–1143	Isaac Komnenos
John Doukas	Andronikos Angelos Doukas	Manuel I Komnenos; 1143–1180	Andronikos I Komnenos; 1183–1185
Michael I Komnenos Doukas; 1205–1215 (E)	Theodore Komnenos Doukas; 1215–1230 (E); 1224–1230 (T)	Manuel Doukas; 1230–1237 (T)	Alexios III Angelos; 1195–1203	Isaac II Angelos; 1185–1195; 1203–1204	Alexios II Komnenos; 1180–1183	Manuel Komnenos
Michael II Komnenos Doukas; 1230–1268 (E)	John Komnenos Doukas; 1237–1244 (T)	Demetrios Angelos Doukas; 1244–1246 (T)	Alexios Palaiologos	Irene Angelina	Theodore I Laskaris; 1205–1221	Anna Angelina	Eudokia Angelina	Alexios V Doukas; 1204	Alexios IV Angelos; 1203–1204	Alexios Komnenos; 1204–1222
Andronikos Palaiologos	Theodora Palaiologina	John III Doukas Vatatzes; 1221–1254	Irene Laskarina	Andronikos Gidos; 1222–1235	? Komnene	John Komnenos Axouchos; 1235–1238	Manuel Komnenos; 1238–1263
Michael VIII Palaiologos; 1261–1282	Theodore II Laskaris; 1254–1258
John IV Laskaris; 1258–1261

== See also ==
- Frankokratia
- Chronology of the Crusades, 1187–1291
- List of wars of succession in Europe
