= Treaty of Nymphaeum =

Treaty of Nymphaeum or Nymphaion can refer to two treaties signed at Nymphaeum or Nymphaion, the winter resort of the Nicaean emperors near Smyrna:

- Treaty of Nymphaeum (1214), between the Empire of Nicaea and the Latin Empire
- Treaty of Nymphaeum (1261), between the Empire of Nicaea and the Republic of Genoa
