= Battle of the Rhyndacus (1211) =

Part of the Nicaean–Latin Wars

- Part of the Nicaean–Latin wars
- Map of the area of the Propontis in the Middle Ages. The Battle of the Rhyndacus was fought near Lopadion.
Date	15 October 1211
Location	Rhyndacus river
Result	Latin victory; Treaty of Nymphaeum

Belligerents
Empire of Nicaea	Latin Empire

Commanders and leaders
Theodore I	Henry of Flanders

Strength
Unknown	2,000; 275 knights & escorts

The Battle of the Rhyndacus was fought on 15 October 1211 between the forces of the Latin Empire and the Byzantine Greek Empire of Nicaea, established following the fragmentation of the Byzantine state after the Fourth Crusade.

The Latin emperor, Henry of Flanders, desired to expand his territory in Asia Minor at the expense of the Nicaeans. He had already achieved a victory in 1205 at Adramyttium, but the need to counter the Bulgarians in Europe had forced him to conclude a truce and depart. By 1211, only a small exclave around Pegai remained in Latin hands. Taking advantage of the losses suffered by the Nicaean army against the Seljuks in the Battle of Antioch on the Meander, Henry landed with his army at Pegai and marched eastward to the Rhyndacus river. Henry had probably some 260 Frankish knights. Laskaris had a larger force overall, but only a handful of Frankish mercenaries of his own, as they had suffered especially heavily against the Seljuks. Laskaris prepared an ambush at the Rhyndacus, but Henry assaulted his positions and scattered the Nicaean troops in a day-long battle on 15 October. The Latin victory, won reportedly without casualties, was crushing: after the battle Henry marched unopposed through Nicaean lands, reaching south as far as Nymphaion.

Warfare lapsed thereafter, and both sides concluded the Treaty of Nymphaeum, which gave the Latin Empire control of most of Mysia up to the village of Kalamos (modern Gelenbe), which was to be uninhabited and mark the boundary between the two states.

== Sources ==
- Brand, Charles M. (1991). "Rhyndakos River". In Kazhdan, Alexander (ed.). The Oxford Dictionary of Byzantium. Oxford and New York: Oxford University Press. p. 1794. ISBN 0-19-504652-8.
- Macrides, Ruth (2007), George Akropolites: The History – Introduction, translation and commentary, Oxford University Press, pp. 148–153, ISBN 978-0-19-921067-1
- Van Tricht, Filip (2011). The Latin Renovatio of Byzantium: The Empire of Constantinople (1204–1228). Leiden: Brill. ISBN 978-90-04-20323-5.
