= Treaty of Nymphaeum (1214) =

1214 treaty between the Nicaean and Latin Empires

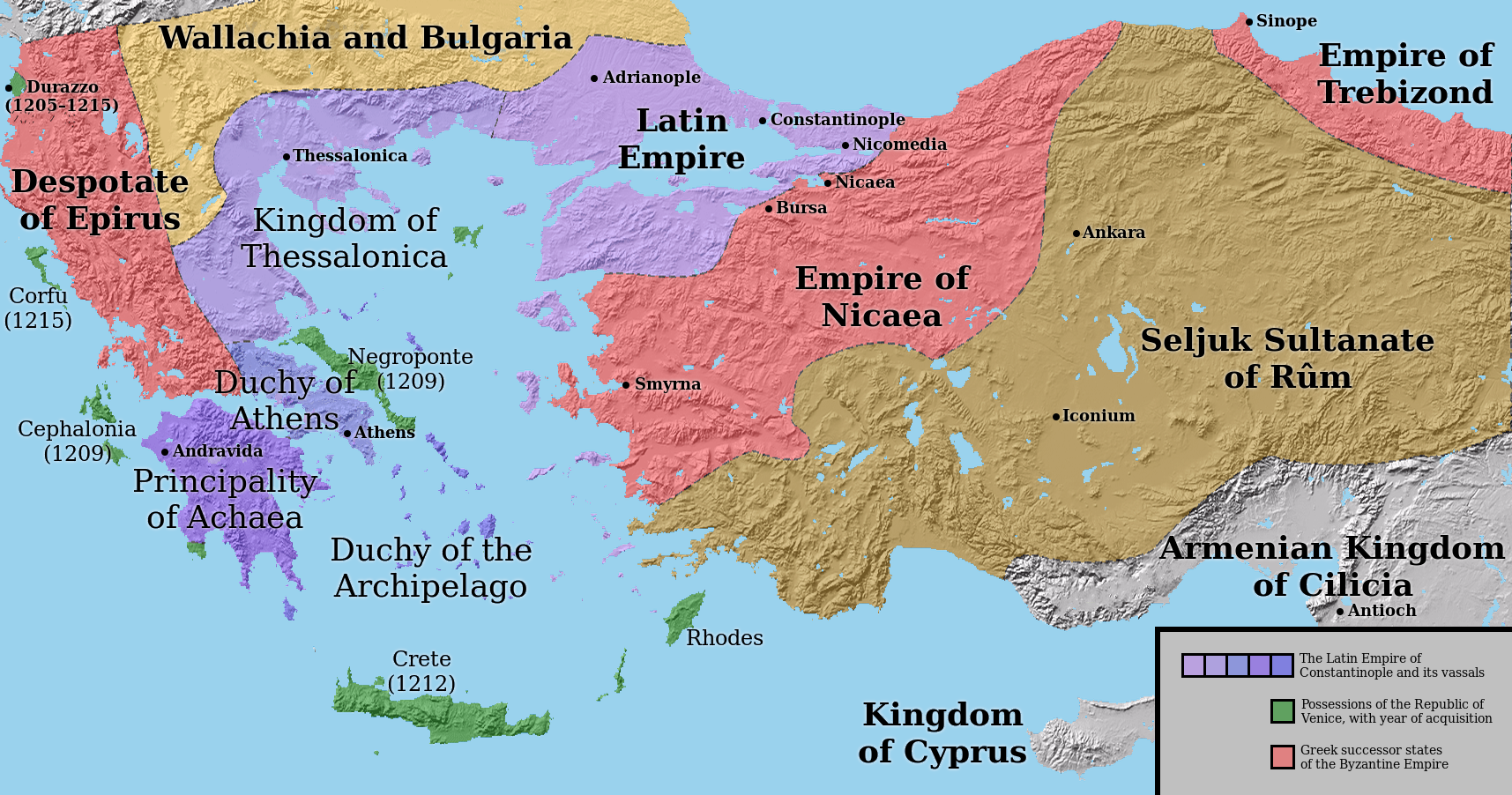
- The Latin Empire and the other Byzantine successor states. The Asian border reflects the provisions of the Treaty of Nymphaeum.
- Signed: December 1214
- Location: Nymphaeum
- Signatories: Latin Empire; Empire of Nicaea

The Treaty of Nymphaeum (Greek: Συνθήκη του Νυμφαίου) was a peace treaty signed in December 1214 between the Nicaean Empire, successor state of the Byzantine Empire, and the Latin Empire, which was established in the aftermath of the Fourth Crusade of 1204.

== Background ==
Following the Fourth Crusade, Baldwin IX of Flanders was elected emperor of the Latin Empire and was recognized to have not only a portion of Constantinople (the remainder was given to the Venetians), but also the north-west region of Asia Minor, although recognition of sovereignty did not mean actual control of the territory. It was up to the emperor to exercise that control, by force of arms if necessary. Following the Fourth Crusade, Baldwin was occupied with events in Thrace and was later taken prisoner by the Bulgarians in the Battle of Adrianople in April 1205. Asia Minor was ignored by the Latins for the time being, thus giving a breathing space for Theodore Lascaris, who had declared himself emperor and was based at Nicaea, to consolidate his power and focus his attention on the Sultanate of Rûm during this time.

Baldwin's brother, Henry, took over the Latin Empire and started operations against the Nicaean Empire at the end of 1206, but these were only minor engagements until Henry focused his attention in 1211. On October 15 of that year, Henry won a major victory at the Rhyndacus River and pushed forward onto Pergamum and Nymphaeum, but guerrilla warfare on Theodore's part limited Henry's further advances. Due to both sides being exhausted, the Treaty of Nymphaeum was signed between the two emperors, halting the Latin advance into Asia Minor. The Latin holdings were confined to the north-western part of Anatolia, comprising the coasts of Bithynia and most of Mysia.

== Aftermath ==
Although both sides would continue to fight for years to come, there were some important consequences of this peace agreement. First, the peace treaty effectively recognized both parties, as neither one was strong enough to destroy the other. The second consequence of the treaty was that David Komnenos, who had been a vassal of Henry and who had been carrying out his own war against Nicaea with the support of the Latin Empire, now effectively lost that support. Theodore was thus able to annex all of David's lands west of Sinope in late 1214, gaining access to the Black Sea. The third consequence was that Theodore was now free to wage war against the Seljuqs without the distraction of the Latins for the time being. Nicaea was able to consolidate their eastern frontier for the remainder of the century. Hostilities broke out again in 1224, and a crushing Nicaean victory at the Second Battle of Poemanenum reduced Latin territories in Asia effectively only to the Nicomedian peninsula. This treaty allowed the Nicaeans to go on the offensive in Europe years later, culminating in the reconquest of Constantinople in 1261.

== Sources ==
- Ostrogorsky, George (1969). History of the Byzantine State. New Brunswick, New Jersey: Rutgers University Press. ISBN 0-8135-1198-4.
