= Geoffrey of Briel =

- Baron of Karytaina
- Reign: 1238–1275
- Predecessor: Hugh of Briel
- Successor: Isabella de la Roche
- Born: c. 1223
- Died: 1275
- Spouse: Isabella de la Roche
- Father: Hugh of Briel
- Mother: Alice of Villehardouin
- Religion: Roman Catholic

Geoffrey of Briel, in older literature Geoffrey of Bruyères, was a French knight and the third lord of the Barony of Karytaina in the Principality of Achaea, in Frankish Greece. He led a colourful and turbulent life, narrated in detail in the Chronicle of the Morea. Accounted the finest knight in the Principality, he fought in the wars against the Byzantine Greeks, was captured in the Battle of Pelagonia in 1259, and was sent back to Achaea bearing the Byzantine terms in 1261. Geoffrey was twice deprived of his barony, once for rebelling against his uncle, the Prince of Achaea William II of Villehardouin, and then for abandoning the Principality without leave in order to spend time with a mistress, the wife of one of his feudatories, in Italy. He was pardoned both times, but henceforth held his title as a gift of the Prince. He died childless in 1275, and the Barony of Karytaina was split up.

== Origin ==
Geoffrey was the son of Hugh of Briel and Alice of Villehardouin, a daughter of the second Prince of Achaea, Geoffrey I of Villehardouin. The family, which hailed from Briel-sur-Barse in the French province of Champagne, is variously named in the sources, e.g. Brieres or Prieres (Μπριέρες or Πριέρης in Greek), Bruières, Briers, Briel or Brielle. Geoffrey's father inherited the Barony of Karytaina sometime around 1222 from his brother, Renaud of Briel. The Barony was the third largest (after Akova and Patras) in the Principality of Achaea, counting 22 knights' fiefs and being responsible for keeping watch over the rebellious inhabitants of the mountainous Skorta area.

== Baron of Karytaina and revolt against William of Villehardouin ==
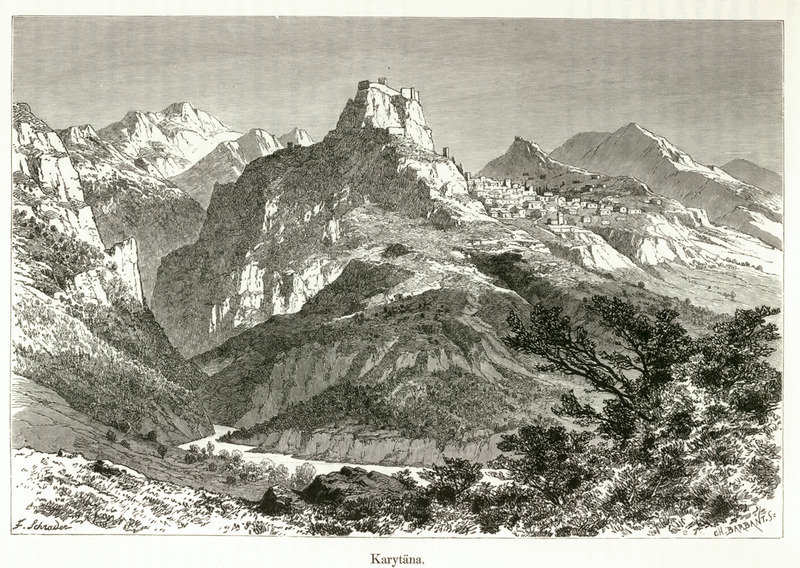
View of Karytaina and its castle in the 19th century

Geoffrey was born in Greece, possibly in Karytaina, soon after his father's arrival there (about 1222/3). Hugh of Briel died in early 1238, not yet forty years old, and was succeeded by the young Geoffrey. The main source on Geoffrey's life are the various versions of the Chronicle of the Morea, which, in the words of the French medievalist Antoine Bon, "narrates with so much detail and indulgence" the "many and colourful adventures" of "a peculiar and charming figure, very representative of the generation of Frankish seigneurs born in Greece". The Chronicle credits Geoffrey with the construction of the Castle of Karytaina, the "Greek Toledo" as William Miller calls it. Geoffrey enjoyed a high reputation as a warrior, and was deemed to be the "best knight in the Morea". According to the Aragonese version of the Chronicle he maintained a school of chivalry at the castle Karytaina, where the sons of the Greek nobles were trained as knights in the Western manner.

Geoffrey married Isabella de la Roche, daughter of the Great Lord of Athens and Thebes, Guy I de la Roche. In 1256–1258, he became involved in the War of the Euboeote Succession, at first as a lieutenant of his uncle, Prince William II of Villehardouin, leading an army that laid waste to Euboea and recovered the town of Negroponte for the Prince. Later, he sided with his father-in-law Guy de la Roche and the other Frankish lords who opposed William's hegemonic ambitions. William however prevailed in the Battle of Karydi in 1258, and a parliament was assembled at Nikli to judge the defeated lords. Geoffrey was pardoned by the Prince and his confiscated lands returned, but this time as a personal grant, rather than a fief held in right of conquest.

== Pelagonia, Byzantine captivity and sojourn in Italy ==
In 1259, Geoffrey participated in the princely army that joined the Achaean–Epirote–Sicilian alliance opposing the Greek Empire of Nicaea. The allied forces, riven by distrust between the Latins and the Epirote Greeks, were dealt a crushing defeat in the Battle of Pelagonia. Prince William and most of his barons, including Geoffrey, were captured in the aftermath of the battle.

Map of the Morea (Peloponnese) in the late Middle Ages

The Frankish lords remained in captivity until 1261, when, following the recovery of Constantinople by the Nicaean Greeks, the Emperor Michael VIII Palaiologos offered to release them in exchange for an oath of fealty to him, and the cession of a number of fortresses in the southeastern Morea. After William agreed, Geoffrey was released in order to convey the emperor's proposals to the nobles of the Principality. A parliament was once again held in Nikli, in the presence of Geoffrey, Guy de la Roche, and the Principality's chancellor, Leonard of Veroli. The captive lords were represented by their wives, whereby this assembly became known as the "Parliament of Ladies". The parliament agreed to the terms, Geoffrey handed over the castles to the Greeks, and returned to Constantinople along with a number of hostages, whereupon Prince William and his barons were released.

The surrender of the fortresses began a long period of conflict between the Greeks of the reconstituted Byzantine Empire and the forces of the Principality for control of the Morea. Prince William was absolved by the Pope of his oaths to Palaiologos, and warfare began almost as soon as he returned to the Principality. Despite this precarious situation, Geoffrey absented himself from the Morea, without William's permission, and spent the years 1263–1265 in Italy, ostensibly on a pilgrimage, but in reality living with the wife of one of his feudatories, John of Katavas. His absence allowed the inhabitants of Skorta to rise up and aid the Byzantine troops in their offensive, which was halted by the same John of Katavas in the Battle of Prinitsa. Geoffrey was again deprived of his barony for this act, but was pardoned and restored to it on his return.

== Final years and death ==
Geoffrey is mentioned again in the campaigns of the early 1270s, when Palaiologos sent a new commander to the Morea, Alexios Doukas Philanthropenos. In 1270, Geoffrey and his neighbour, the Baron of Akova, joined the Prince's army with 150 horsemen and 200 infantry. The Latin force raided the Byzantine holdings in Laconia, but Philanthropenos avoided being drawn into a pitched battle. A period of relative peace followed due to Palaiologos' attempts to placate the Pope in the ongoing Second Council of Lyon, but in 1275, the mutual truce was broken by the Greeks. Prince William entrusted a force of 50 horse and 200 crossbowmen to Geoffrey, who stationed them to keep watch over the defiles of Skorta, but he died of dysentery in late 1275. After his death, Karytaina was increasingly subject to the attacks of the Byzantines, and finally fell to them in 1320.

Geoffrey died childless; the barony, held by grant, was inheritable only by Geoffrey's direct descendants, and consequently was split upon his death: one half remained with his widow, Isabella de la Roche, who married Hugh, Count of Brienne, before her death in 1279, and the other reverted to the Prince's domain. Two pretenders to Geoffrey's inheritance appeared over the next few years: a certain John Pestel, who achieved nothing, and Geoffrey's nephew, Geoffrey the Younger, who after much persistence managed to obtain the fief of Moraina.

== Fictional portrayals ==
Geoffrey is the eponymous subject of Alfred Duggan's 1962 novel, Lord Geoffrey's Fancy. A sympathetic but flawed hero, observed by his distant cousin, an admiring but increasingly disillusioned narrator, the baron of Karytaina is portrayed as a supreme exemplar of both the qualities and the limitations of Frankish chivalry.

== Sources ==
- Bon, Antoine (1969). La Morée franque. Recherches historiques, topographiques et archéologiques sur la principauté d'Achaïe [The Frankish Morea. Historical, Topographic and Archaeological Studies on the Principality of Achaea] (in French). Paris: De Boccard.
- Dourou-Iliopoulou, Maria (2005). Το Φραγκικό Πριγκιπάτο της Αχαΐας (1204-1432). Ιστορία. Οργάνωση. Κοινωνία. [The Frankish Principality of Achaea (1204-1432). History. Organization. Society.] (in Greek). Thessaloniki: Vanias Publications. ISBN 960-288-153-4.
- Evergates, Theodore (1994). "The Origin of the Lords of Karytaina in the Frankish Morea". Medieval Prosopography. 15 (1): 81–114.
- Longnon, Jean (1969) [1962]. "The Frankish States in Greece, 1204–1311". In Setton, Kenneth M.; Wolff, Robert Lee; Hazard, Harry W. (eds.). A History of the Crusades, Volume II: The Later Crusades, 1189–1311. Vol. 2 (Second ed.). Madison, Milwaukee, and London: University of Wisconsin Press. pp. 234–275. ISBN 0-299-04844-6.
- Miller, William (1921). Essays on the Latin Orient. Cambridge: Cambridge University Press.
- Setton, Kenneth M. (1976). The Papacy and the Levant (1204–1571), Volume I: The Thirteenth and Fourteenth Centuries. Vol. 1. Philadelphia: The American Philosophical Society. ISBN 0-87169-114-0.

Preceded by Hugh of Briel	Baron of Karytaina; 1238–1275	Succeeded by Isabella de la Roche as Lady of one half of the Barony of Karytaina
