= Villehardouin family =

Coat of arms of the Villehardouin family

The Villehardouin family was a noble dynasty that originated in Villehardouin, a former commune of the Aube department, now part of Val-d'Auzon, France. It is most notable as the ruling house of the Principality of Achaea, a Frankish crusader state in the Peloponnese peninsula of Greece, between 1209 and 1278, when possession passed to the Angevin Kings of Naples.

== Notable members ==
1. Vilain of Villehardouin (died before 1170)
  1. John of Villehardouin (died after 1216), Lord of Villehardouin
    1. Geoffrey I of Villehardouin (ca. 1169–1229/31), helped William of Champlitte conquer the Morea, Prince of Achaea in 1209–1229/31; married Elisabeth (de Chappes?)
      1. Geoffrey II of Villehardouin (c. 1194-1246), Prince of Achaea in 1229/31–1246; married Agnes of Courtenay
      2. William II of Villehardouin (1211–1278), Prince of Achaea in 1246–1278; married a daughter (name unknown) of Narjot of Toucy, Carintana dalle Carceri (died 1255); Anna Komnene Doukaina (died 1286)
        1. Isabella of Villehardouin (1260/63–1312), Princess of Achaea in 1289–1307; married Philip of Sicily (died 1277), Florent of Hainaut (died 1297), Philip of Savoy (died 1334)
          1. Matilda of Hainaut (died 1331), Lady of Kalamata in 1297–1308, 1311–1322, Princess of Achaea in 1313–1318; married Guy II de la Roche (died 1308), Louis of Burgundy (died 1316), John of Gravina (died 1336), (secretly) Hugh de la Palisse
        2. Margaret of Villehardouin (1266–1315), Lady of Akova; married Isnard of Sabran (died 1297), Richard Orsini (died 1303/4)
          1. Isabella of Sabran (1297–1315), married Infante Ferdinand of Majorca (died 1316)
      3. Theodosius of Villehardouin, Patriarch of Antioch known as Theodosius V
      4. Alice of Villehardouin, married Hugh of Briel, Lord of Karytaina
    2. Eremburge of Villehardouin, married de Bernard de Montbar
    3. unknown
      1. Eudes, Bishop of Coron before 1209
  2. Roscelin of Villehardouin (died before 1170), Canon of Saint-Etienne Church in Troyes
  3. Vilain of Villehardouin, vice-dean of Saint-Etienne Church in Troyes, excommunicated 1192
  4. Geoffrey of Villehardouin (died before 1218), Marshal of the Champagne, participant in the Fourth Crusade, Marshal of the Latin Empire, and author of the Chronicle of The Fourth Crusade and The Conquest of Constantinople
    1. Erard I of Villy (died 1224), Lord of Lézinnes, of Villehardouin etc.
      1. William I of Lézinnes (died 1246), Marschal of the Champagne
        1. Erard II of Lézinnes (died 1279), Bishop of Auxerre, Cardinal and Bishop of Palestrina in 1276–1279
        2. William II of Lézinnes (died 1264)
        3. Isabeau (died after 1299); married Walter IV of Châtillon (died 1261)
    2. Mary of Villehardouin, married Ascelin de Merry
    3. Alix of Villehardouin (died 1249) also called Adelaide, abbess of Abbey of Notre Dame aux Nonnains in Troyes
    4. Geoffroi of Villehardouin
    5. Dameron of Villehardouin, abbess of Foissy abbey
  5. Emeline of Villehardouin, abbess of Montier-en-l'Isle (1232)
  6. Haice of Villehardouin, nun at Foissy abbey
  7. Gui of Villehardouin (died before 1223), also called la Grive, Lord of Villevoques
  8. Gautier of Villehardouin

== Sources ==
- Bon, Antoine (1969). La Morée franque. Recherches historiques, topographiques et archéologiques sur la principauté d'Achaïe (in French). Paris: De Boccard. p. 697.
- Longnon, Jean (1949). L'empire latin de Constantinople et la principauté de Morée (in French). Paris: Payot.
- Petit, Ernest (1913). Société Académique de l'Aube - Généalogies Féodales - Les Sires de Villehardouin (in French). Troyes: Imprimerie & Lithographie J.-L. Paton. p. 19.
