= Briel =

Briel is a parish in the municipality of Buggenhout, Dendermonde in Flanders, Belgium

Briel may also refer to:

== Given name ==
- Briel Adams-Wheatley, American beauty influencer

== Surname ==
- Dick Briel (1950–2011), Dutch comic artist
- Don J. Briel (1947–2018), American theologian
- Jonatan Briel (1942–1988), German director, screenplay author, and actor
- Judah Briel (1643–1722), Italian rabbi
- Lou Briel (living), Puerto Rican singer, composer, comedian, record producer, pianist, and host
- Louis Briel (1945–2021), American painter and author
- Murri Briel (living), American politician

== See also ==
- Briel-sur-Barse, commune in France
  - Renaud of Briel (died c. 1222)
  - Hugh of Briel (died 1238)
  - Geoffrey of Briel (c. 1223 – 1275)
  - Geoffrey II of Briel (fl. 1279)
- Brielle, town in the Netherlands
- Brielle, New Jersey
- Brielle (given name)
- Breil (disambiguation)
