= Battle of Pelagonia =

Battle between Frankish and Byzantine forces in 1259

Coordinates: 40°49′N 21°34′E

- Part of the Nicaean–Latin wars and Epirote–Nicaean conflict
Date	Early summer or autumn of 1259
Location	Plain of Pelagonia
Result	Nicaean victory
Territorial changes	Collapse of the Epiroto-Latin League

Belligerents
Empire of Nicaea	Despotate of Epirus; Principality of Achaea; • Duchy of Athens; • Duchy of the Archipelago; • Triarchy of Negroponte; Kingdom of Sicily

Commanders and leaders
John Palaiologos; Alexios Strategopoulos; John Doukas	Michael II Komnenos Doukas; John Doukas (defected); William of Villehardouin (POW); Geoffrey of Briel (POW); Angelo Sanudo (surrendered)
- Approximate location within Greece

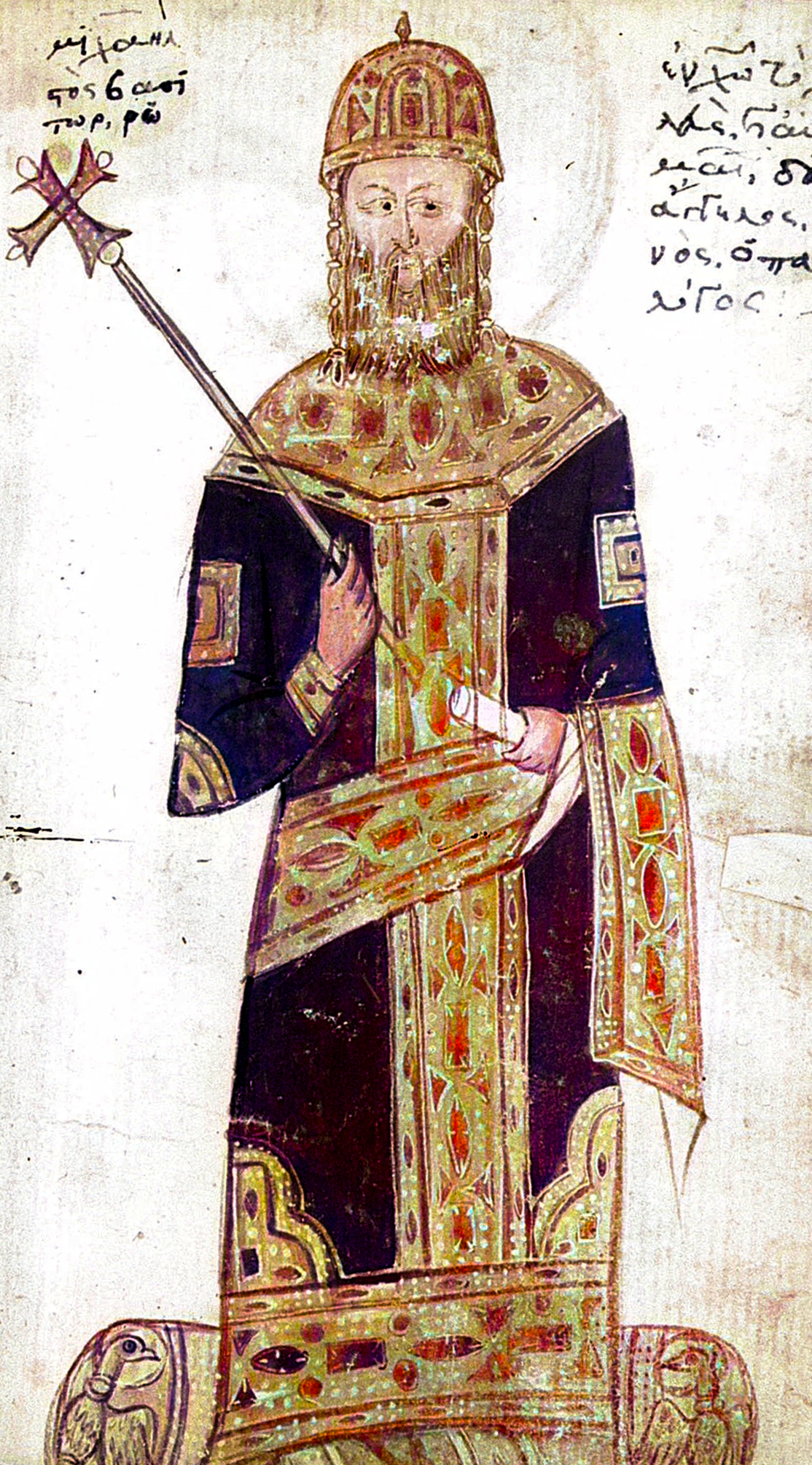
Miniature portrait of Michael VIII Palaiologos in full regalia

The Battle of Pelagonia or Battle of Kastoria took place in early summer or autumn 1259, between the Empire of Nicaea and an anti-Nicaean alliance comprising Despotate of Epirus, Kingdom of Sicily and the Principality of Achaea. It was a decisive event in the history of the Eastern Mediterranean, ensuring the eventual reconquest of Constantinople and the end of the Latin Empire in 1261.

The rising power of Nicaea in the southern Balkans, and the ambitions of its ruler, Michael VIII Palaiologos, to recover Constantinople, led the formation of a coalition between the Epirote Greeks, under Michael II Komnenos Doukas, and the chief Latin rulers of the time, the Prince of Achaea, William of Villehardouin, and Manfred of Sicily. The details of the battle, including its precise date and location, are disputed as the primary sources give contradictory information; modern scholars usually place it either in July or in September, somewhere in the plain of Pelagonia or near Kastoria. It appears that the barely concealed rivalries between the Epirote Greeks and their Latin allies came to the fore in the lead-up to the battle, possibly fanned by Palaiologos' agents. As a result, the Epirotes abandoned the Latins on the eve of the battle, while Michael II's bastard son John Doukas defected to the Nicaean camp. The Latins were then set upon by the Nicaeans and routed, while many nobles, including Villehardouin, were taken captive.

The battle cleared the last obstacle to the Nicaean reconquest of Constantinople in 1261 and the re-establishment of the Byzantine Empire under the Palaiologos dynasty. It also led to the brief conquest of Epirus and Thessaly by Nicaean forces, although Michael II and his sons rapidly managed to reverse these gains. In 1262, William of Villehardouin was released in exchange for three fortresses on the southeastern tip of the Morea peninsula. This foothold would be gradually expanded, and would over the next century become the Despotate of the Morea.

== Background ==
Following the fall of the Byzantine Empire to the Fourth Crusade in 1204, the two main Byzantine Greek contenders for the imperial legacy of Byzantium were the Empire of Nicaea in western Asia Minor, and the Despotate of Epirus in western Greece. This engendered a persistent rivalry between the two states as to which would first recover Constantinople. Nicaea gained an important advantage following the conquest of Macedonia by the Nicaean emperor John III Vatatzes (r. 1222–1254). Following Vatatzes' conquests, the region of Pelagonia in western Macedonia became a border zone between the Nicaean and Epirote domains.

When Vatatzes died in 1254, the ruler of Epirus, Michael II Komnenos Doukas (r. 1230–1268), sponsored a rebellion against Nicaea in Macedonia, and invaded the Nicaean domains, capturing the fortress of Prilep and the local Nicaean governor, and future historian, George Akropolites. Michael II's advance on Thessalonica was interrupted, however, when Manfred of Sicily (r. 1258–1266) landed his own troops in Albania and captured most of it, as well as Corfu. Like the earlier Norman kings of Sicily, Manfred had his own ambitions in the Balkans, including Constantinople itself; and the enforced residence of his half-sister, Constance, the widow of Vatatzes, at the Nicaean court, only aggravated his feelings towards Nicaea. Thus, when Michael II offered to hand over Albania and Corfu as the dowry of his eldest daughter Helena, Manfred accepted. Michael II now formed a wider anti-Nicaean alliance, by giving his second daughter, Anna, to the Latin Prince of Achaea, William of Villehardouin (r. 1246–1278), who was also overlord of the other Latin states of southern Greece, the Duchy of Athens and the Triarchs of Negroponte. Michael II also secured the backing of the Serbian king, Stephen Urosh I (r. 1243–1276), while Vatatzes' son and successor, Theodore II Laskaris (r. 1254–1258), in turn sought the support of Constantine Tikh of Bulgaria (r. 1257–1277) giving him his own daughter Irene in marriage. Before he could campaign against Epirus, however, he died and was succeeded his young son John IV Laskaris (r. 1258–1261). Very soon, power was seized by the ambitious aristocrat Michael VIII Palaiologos (r. 1259–1282), first as regent and then as senior co-emperor.

== Nicaean expedition against Epirus ==
Michael Palaiologos found himself faced with a powerful coalition that, according to the Byzantinist Donald Nicol, "seemed likely to threaten the possession not only of Thessalonica but even of Constantinople itself". Michael Palaiologos did not tarry. Already in the autumn of 1258, his army crossed over into Europe, under his brother John Palaiologos, who held the quasi-imperial rank of sebastokrator, and the megas domestikos (commander-in-chief) Alexios Strategopoulos, and wintered in Macedonia, where it was joined by local levies. At the same time, Michael Palaiologos sent separate embassies to each of the three main allies, hoping to pry them apart by diplomacy. These efforts failed, as the three allies stood to gain much from a successful offensive against Nicaea.

In spring 1259, the Nicaeans went on the offensive, and advanced quickly westwards along the Via Egnatia. Michael II of Epirus, who was encamped at Kastoria, was caught off guard by the rapidity of their advance, and when the Nicaeans crossed the pass of Vodena to face him, he was forced to hastily retreat with his troops across the Pindus mountains to the vicinity of Avlona, held by his ally Manfred. There the final negotiations for the marriage between Manfred and Helena were concluded: the wedding took place at Trani on 2 June 1259. In their retreat, which continued even during night, the Epirotes reportedly lost many men in the dangerous mountain passes, while the Nicaean generals captured Ohrid and Deavolis and other cities.

== Opposing forces ==
The Epirote ruler had lost much of his territory, but soon his Latin allies came to his aid. Manfred, preoccupied with his conflicts against the Guelphs in central Italy, did not come in person–although his presence is erroneously reported by near-contemporary sources like Nikephoros Gregoras and Matteo Spinelli—but sent 400 superbly outfitted German knights, who probably landed at Avlona to join Michael II's forces. William of Villehardouin on the other hand campaigned at the head his forces. The Greek and French versions of the Chronicle of the Morea mention troops from Achaea, the Duchy of Athens, the Triarchy of Negroponte, and the Duchy of the Archipelago under William's command, implying a general feudal levy from the Frankish states of Greece, which were vassals of the Prince of Achaea. Many of the most distinguished nobles of Frankish Greece also took part in the expedition. The Achaean host crossed the Gulf of Corinth at Naupaktos and marched to the Epirote capital of Arta, before crossing the Pindus at joining the forces of the other Frankish states at Thalassionon (possibly Elassona in northern Thessaly). Michael of Epirus in turn was accompanied by his elder son Nikephoros and further aided by his bastard son John Doukas, who brought with him many Vlachs from the Great Vlachia region of Thessaly. The Aragonese Chronicle of the Morea gives the totals of 8,000 heavily-armed and 12,000 lightly armed troops for William's army, including twenty dukes, counts, and barons; and 8,000 heavily-armed and 18,000 lightly armed troops for the Epirote army. These numbers are universally considered as much exaggerated by modern historians.

On the Nicaean side, the army comprised not only native Greek contingents from Asia Minor, Macedonia and Thrace, but also many mercenaries; according to the Chronicle of the Morea, (Note: The Greek and French versions of the Chronicle are in agreement, whereas the later Aragonese and Italian versions give exaggerated numbers.) 300 German knights, "all select, all hand-picked", 1,500 Hungarian "choice mounted archers", 600 Serbian horsemen, (Note: Historians point out that if true, this is a remarkable fact, given the close relations of the Serbian king with the anti-Nicaean alliance. Thus Kenneth Setton suggests that rather than a royal army, it may instead have been "some disaffected Serbian nobleman [...] with his own followers" who joined the Nicaeans on his own account.) likewise "all good archers", and even Bulgarian cavalry, as well as 1,500 Turkish and 2,000 Cuman cavalry. The Chronicle mentions that the Germans were led by the "Duke of Karentana", usually identified with Carinthia. The duke at the time was Ulrich III, but he ruled for many years after 1259, and was probably not at the battle, where the Chronicle maintains that he was killed at the hand of Geoffrey of Briel, the Baron of Karytaina. The modern editor of the Greek version of the chronicle, Petros P. Kalonaros, opined that the "Duke of Karantana" is a fictitious character symbolizing a brave warrior, and the name was chosen possibly under the influence of a corruption of the name Karytaina. It is also likely that Latin troops fought on the Nicaean side, although they are not explicitly mentioned: they were a prominent element of previous Nicaean armies, and Michael Palaiologos had relied on their support for his usurpation. The total size of the Nicaean army is nowhere reported, except for a reference in the Greek Chronicle that it comprised 27 regiments (allagia). However, according to the historian Deno John Geanakoplos, "the statements of the Chronicle of the Morea are often exaggerated", and "one gets a clear impression from the sources [...] that the allied forces surpassed those of Nicaea in size".

== Differences in the sources ==
The main Byzantine sources, George Akropolites, Nikephoros Gregoras, and George Pachymeres, offer considerably divergent accounts on the exact course of events before and during the battle, while the Western sources, chiefly the Greek and French versions of the Chronicle of the Morea and the history of the Venetian Marino Sanudo Torcello, in turn differ from the Byzantine sources and from each other. The narrative of the Chronicle is generally considered less reliable, being riddled with errors and mix-ups, but often provides details not appearing elsewhere. The account of the Chronicle focuses not on Prince William of Villehardouin, but on his nephew Geoffrey of Briel, whose deeds in the battle are presented in length, and in a style reminiscent of contemporary epic poems on Achilles or Digenes Akritas, whereas William is almost mentioned in passing. Briel was the only male grandchild of the first Villehardouin Prince of Achaea, Geoffrey I of Villehardouin, and hence a potential claimant to the Principality. (Note: It is therefore likely that the Chronicle''s author relied on an epic on Briel's life as his main source for the events of the campaign.)

Akropolites emphasizes the Nicaeans' use of strategy, and his account describes "a series of skirmishes on the road rather than a confrontation of two armies on a battlefield", giving the impression that "the defeat of the allies at the hands of the Nicene forces came quickly and ingloriously", whereas the Chronicle is at pains to portray the fight as a heroic albeit doomed combat, exaggerating the number of the Nicaean troops, avoiding any mention of the Sicilian contingent, and stressing the role of Nicaean agents in spreading dissension among the allies. Gregoras and Pachymeres, while following the earlier account of Akropolites in the main, contain elements also found in the Chronicle, including the role of a Nicaean agent, and praise for the valiant conduct of the Achaean nobles.

As a result of the differences in the sources, numerous details of the battle remain unclear, from the exact date (proposed dates range from June to November), the location (Pelagonia or Kastoria), or the exact roles the various leaders played in the events. The two main suggestions for the date are by Donald Nicol, in early summer (July), and Deno Geanakoplos, in early fall (around September). The exact location of the battle has been disputed, as the only clear toponym given in the sources is Boril's Wood (Βορίλλα λόγγος), which has been variously placed by modern researchers close to Prilep, Kastoria, or Bitola (then known as Pelagonia). Using the sources and the topography to reconstruct the movements of the armies, the modern scholars Freiderikos Rochontzis and Robert Mihajlovski have independently suggested as the battlefield the plain between Florina and Kaimakchalan, north of Kastoria, near the modern settlement of Vevi (formerly known as Banitsa); a strategically important location where the Battle of Lyncestis had been fought in 423 BC and the Battle of Vevi was fought in 1941.

== Battle ==
[The Nicaeans] engaged the enemy, striking them with arrows from a distance. They began to attack the enemy from a place whose name is Borilla Longos. They allowed them neither to march freely in the daytime nor to rest at night. For they clashed with them in the day when they were watering their horses—if someone should distance himself to water his horse—and they fell upon them also on the road and, drawing near their carts and beasts of burden, they plundered their loads, while those who were guarding yielded.

— Description of the Nicaean hit-and-run strategy of attrition by George Akropolites, The History, §81

Akropolites puts the location of the first clashes between the two armies at Boril's Wood. In view of their numerical disadvantage, the Nicaeans had no choice but to employ strategy to overcome their opponents, aiming at the cohesion of the enemy alliance. Like all Greeks, the Epirotes mistrusted and hated the Franks as a result of the Fourth Crusade and the oppression of the Orthodox Greeks by the Roman Catholic clergy in the Frankish states, while the Franks despised the Greeks as cowardly, devious and schismatic.

The sebastokrator John Palaiologos followed a deliberate strategy of attrition to wear down his opponents and impact their morale, while avoiding a direct confrontation. Akropolites ascribes this to advice given from the outset of the campaign by Michael Palaiologos to his brother. According to this plan, John distributed his men, leaving the heavily armed troops to occupy strong defensive positions on the hills, while his lighter Cuman, Turkish and Greek troops harassed the allied army with hit-and-run attacks, striking at their horses when they were being watered and plundering their supply trains. Faced with this constant harassment, Akropolites reports that the morale of the Epirote army withered, and Michael II with his troops withdrew towards Prilep, while John Doukas deserted the allied cause and went over to the Nicaeans.

Gregoras, however, reports that Michael II's flight was precipitated by John Palaiologos, who sent a false deserter to the Epirote camp, claiming that the Franks had secretly agreed with the sebastokrator to betray the Epirotes in exchange for money. Persuaded, the Epirote ruler immediately fled his camp with as many men as he could gather, while the rest of the Epirote army too dispersed after his flight became known. Pachymeres offers a completely different version, highlighting the discord present among the allies even before they met with the Nicaean army, allegedly as the result of some Achaean knights coveting John Doukas' beautiful Vlach wife. Matters were made worse when William of Villehardouin not only did not punish his men, but also insulted John Doukas for his illegitimate birth, infuriating the latter. John Doukas then entered into contact with John Palaiologos, and after extracting promises that his father and half-brother would not be harmed, persuaded them to withdraw during night. Pachymeres' account of William insulting John the Bastard is further confirmed by Marino Sanudo.

The first battalion [the Nicaeans] had was that of the Germans, and when the renowned lord of Karytaina saw them, he immediately rushed at them, and they couched their lances. The first he met and to whom he dealt a blow of the lance was he who was called Duke of Carinthia, and striking him on the chest, where his shield was raised for protection, he flung him lifeless onto the ground together with his horse. After that he slew two others who were the Duke’s kinsmen. The lance which he held shattered into three pieces, and so he quickly drew his sword and began to do battle in earnest with the Germans, and all those who came to fight him he mowed down like hay in a field.

— Geoffrey of Briel kills the 'Duke of Carinthia', Chronicle of the Morea, Greek version, vv. 4017–4032

Whatever the true course of events, on the next morning, when the Epirote flight was discovered by their Latin allies, they too tried to withdraw, but it was too late. The Nicaeans fell upon them, and in addition, according to Pachymeres, John Doukas and his Vlachs attacked from the rear. Many Latins were killed, while most of the survivors were taken prisoner. Gregoras reports that the 400 Germans surrendered to only four Nicaeans (possibly high-ranking commanders), while the forces of William of Villehardouin scattered. The Prince himself was discovered hiding in a pile of hay (Akropolites) or a shrub (Pachymeres) near Kastoria, and some thirty of his most senior barons were likewise taken captive.

The Chronicle of the Morea offers a variant account, but confuses the leading personages, claiming that "Theodore Doukas" (an error for John Doukas) was the commander of the Nicaean forces, and placing Nikephoros at the head of the Epirote army. According to the Chronicle, the Nicaean commander tried to frighten his opponents by lighting many camp fires and using cattle to simulate marching troops, and sent an agent to the allied camp to persuade the Despot of the vastly superior size of the Nicaean force. The stratagem worked in so far as the Epirote troops fled during the night, while the Nicaeans, emboldened by this, moved to confront the Achaeans. The Achaeans, with Geoffrey of Briel leading the van, managed to rout the German knights who were the Nicaeans' first line; but the sebastokrator ordered his Hungarian and Cuman horse archers to shoot indiscriminately at the horses of the Franks and the Germans, bringing the knights down and forcing them to surrender.

According to Geanakoplos, although differing in details, the various accounts can be reconciled to form a more complete picture of the battle. Certainly the crucial turning point, Michael II's flight on the eve of the battle, is easy to explain even without a Nicaean stratagem: the Epirote ruler was disquieted by the presence of such a strong Frankish army, and feared that in the event of an allied victory, he would be likely to lose his own territory to the Latins, fears which would have been confirmed with the clash between his son John Doukas and William of Villehardouin in the days leading up to the battle. Conversely, if the Nicaeans won, not only his rule, but his own life would be in danger, leading him to choose flight instead.

== Aftermath ==
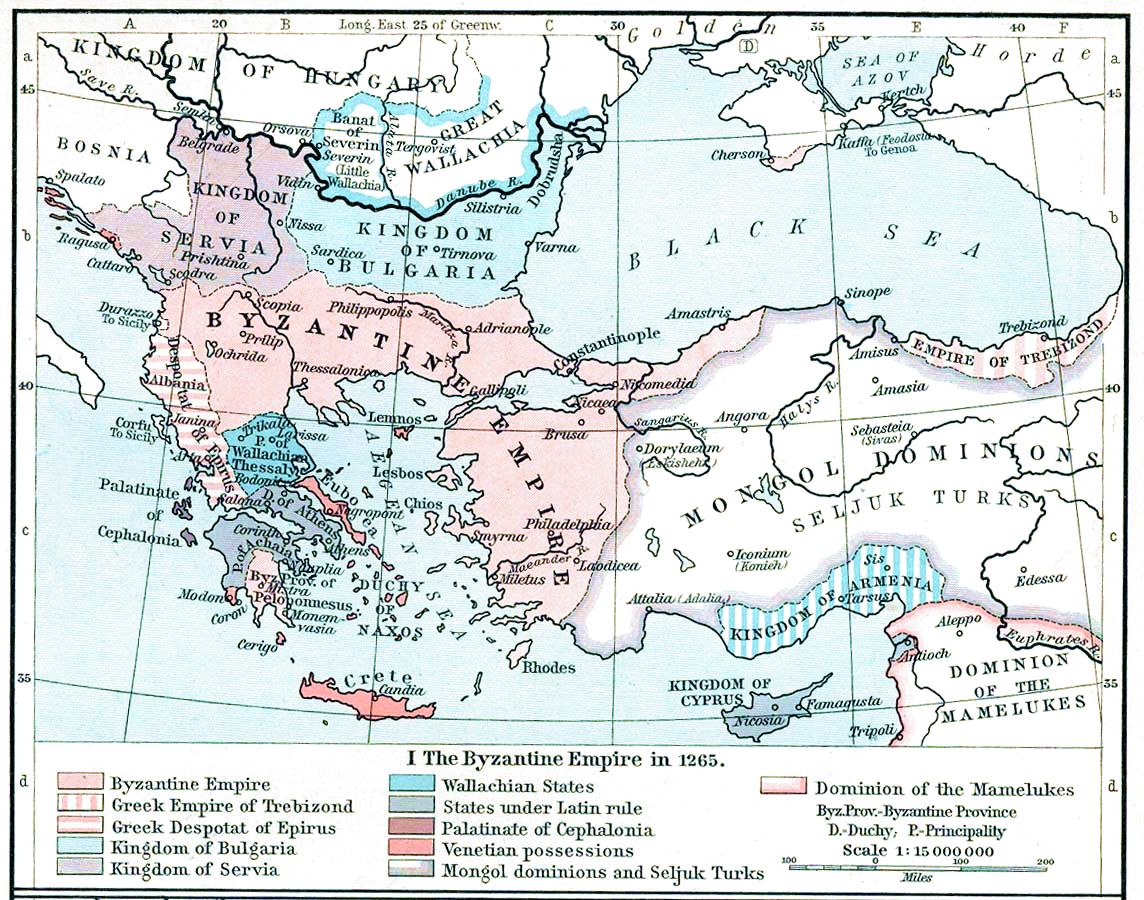
Map of the restored Byzantine Empire of Michael VIII Palaiologos and the surrounding states in 1265

The battle was a decisive event for the subsequent history of the Balkans. With the collapse of the Epirote–Latin league, Michael Palaiologos was free to pursue the reconquest of Constantinople and the revival of the Byzantine Empire: the rump Latin Empire was now cut off from any aid, and the capture of Villehardouin deprived it, in the words of Donald Nicol, "of its only capable defender". Already in 1260, Michael Palaiologos attacked Constantinople, as one of the knights taken prisoner in Pelagonia, and whose house was in the city walls, had promised to open a gate for the emperor's troops. He failed to do so, and Palaiologos launched an unsuccessful assault on Galata instead. Constantinople was finally captured, almost by chance, by Alexios Strategopoulos on 25 July 1261, allowing for the re-establishment of the Byzantine Empire under the Palaiologos dynasty.

The Nicaean victory at Pelagonia also led to immediate, but short-lived, territorial expansion in Greece: John Palaiologos invaded Thessaly and the Duchy of Athens up to Thebes, while Alexios Strategopoulos and John Raoul Petraliphas were tasked with reducing Epirus proper. Strategopoulos and Petraliphas crossed the Pindus Mountains, bypassed Ioannina, which they left under siege, and captured the Epirote capital, Arta, forcing Michael II to flee to the island of Cephalonia. At Arta they found and released many Nicaean prisoners, including Akropolites. In the next year, however, the Nicaean successes were largely undone: John Doukas defected back to his father, and Michael II with an Italian mercenary army landed at Arta, and the Epirote population rallied to his cause. The Epirotes routed the Nicaeans, and Strategopoulos himself was captured and briefly held prisoner.

The battle was a particularly heavy blow to the Principality of Achaea. It was the first heavy defeat it had ever suffered, and at a stroke lost most of its soldiers and a greater part of its nobles. Alongside the Prince, his close relatives Anselin of Toucy and Geoffrey of Briel were also captured. As a result, the entire Morea peninsula was also opened up to Michael Palaiologos' ambitions. The emperor offered to set free Villehardouin and his nobles and provide for comfortable retainers for them, if they were to hand over the Principality to him; and while Villehardouin refused this offer, after the fall of Constantinople he finally agreed to hand over a number of fortresses and swear an oath of allegiance to Palaiologos in exchange for his freedom. This was ratified by the so-called "Parliament of Ladies" (as most of the male nobles of Achaea were prisoners), and in early 1262 Villehardouin was released, and the forts of Monemvasia and Mystras, as well as the district of Mani, were handed over to the Byzantines. From there the Byzantines would launch repeated attempts to conquer Achaea, and although these failed for the moment, (Note: In one of these conflicts, the Battle of Prinitza, a small Frankish force routed a far more numerous Byzantine army. The Chronicle of the Morea has an envoy from Michael Palaiologos berating the Byzantine commander (another of Michael's brothers, Constantine) for neglecting the lessons of Pelagonia and confronting the Franks head on instead of by stratagem, and of not shooting at their horses.) they were extremely costly to the Achaeans. In the longer term, the foothold gained by the Byzantines in the region would form the nucleus of the Despotate of the Morea, where Byzantine culture enjoyed its last flowering before the Ottoman conquest.

The defeat at Pelagonia also ended the supremacy of the Principality of Achaea in the affairs of Frankish Greece, and the Nicaean/Byzantine offensive that followed further curtailed its political independence. No longer able to confront the resurgent Byzantines, Prince William turned to the successors of Manfred of Sicily, the Angevins of Naples, for aid, as, faced with a common enemy, did the Greek rulers of Epirus and Thessaly. The result was the Treaty of Viterbo in 1267, after which, in the words of the historian Peter Lock, "The Frankish states of the Aegean [...] became virtual marcher lordships of the Angevin kingdom of Naples and no longer lordships in their own right. They become subsumed in the power politics of the Mediterranean as viewed from a Neapolitan perspective".

== Sources ==
- Bartusis, Mark C. (1997). The Late Byzantine Army: Arms and Society 1204–1453. Philadelphia, Pennsylvania: University of Pennsylvania Press. ISBN 978-0-8122-1620-2.
- Bon, Antoine (1969). La Morée franque. Recherches historiques, topographiques et archéologiques sur la principauté d'Achaïe [The Frankish Morea. Historical, Topographic and Archaeological Studies on the Principality of Achaea] (in French). Paris: De Boccard.
- Fine, John V. A. (1994) [1987]. The Late Medieval Balkans: A Critical Survey from the Late Twelfth Century to the Ottoman Conquest. Ann Arbor, Michigan: University of Michigan Press. ISBN 978-0-472-10079-8.
- Geanakoplos, Deno John (1953). "Greco-Latin Relations on the Eve of the Byzantine Restoration: The Battle of Pelagonia–1259". Dumbarton Oaks Papers. 7: 99–141. doi:10.2307/1291057. JSTOR 1291057.
- Geanakoplos, Deno John (1959). Emperor Michael Palaeologus and the West, 1258–1282: A Study in Byzantine-Latin Relations. Cambridge, Massachusetts: Harvard University Press.
- Lock, Peter (2013) [1995]. The Franks in the Aegean, 1204–1500. New York and London: Routledge. ISBN 978-0-582-05139-3.
- Longnon, Jean (1969) [1962]. "The Frankish States in Greece, 1204–1311". In Setton, Kenneth M.; Wolff, Robert Lee; Hazard, Harry W. (eds.). A History of the Crusades, Volume II: The Later Crusades, 1189–1311. Vol. 2 (Second ed.). Madison, Milwaukee, and London: University of Wisconsin Press. pp. 234–275. ISBN 0-299-04844-6.
- Lurier, Harold E., ed. (1964). Crusaders as Conquerors: The Chronicle of Morea. New York and London: Columbia University Press. LCCN 62-9367.
- Macrides, Ruth (2007). George Akropolites: The History – Introduction, Translation and Commentary. Oxford: Oxford University Press. ISBN 978-0-19-921067-1.
- Mihajlovski, Robert (2006). "The Battle of Pelagonia 1259: A New Look through the March Routes and Topography". Byzantinoslavica. 64: 275–284. ISSN 0007-7712.
- Nicol, Donald M. (1993) [1972]. The Last Centuries of Byzantium, 1261–1453 (Second ed.). Cambridge: Cambridge University Press. ISBN 978-0-521-43991-6.
- Ostrogorsky, George (1956). History of the Byzantine State. Oxford: Basil Blackwell.
- Rochontzis, Freiderikos (1982). "Η αναβίωση του Ελληνισμού και η παρακμή της Φραγκοκρατίας: μάχη της Καστοριάς (1259 μ.Χ.)" [The rebirth of Hellenism and decline of Frankocracy: The Battle of Kastoria (1259 AD)]. Makedonika (in Greek). 22: 340–357. doi:10.12681/makedonika.528. ISSN 0076-289X.
- Setton, Kenneth M. (1976). The Papacy and the Levant (1204–1571), Volume I: The Thirteenth and Fourteenth Centuries. Vol. 1. Philadelphia: The American Philosophical Society. ISBN 0-87169-114-0.
- Shawcross, Teresa (2009). The Chronicle of Morea: Historiography in Crusader Greece. Oxford and New York: Oxford University Press. ISBN 978-0-19-955700-4.
- Talbot, Alice-Mary (1991). "Morea, Despotate of". In Kazhdan, Alexander (ed.). The Oxford Dictionary of Byzantium. Oxford and New York: Oxford University Press. pp. 1409–1410. ISBN 0-19-504652-8.
- Talbot, Alice-Mary (1991). "Pelagonia, Battle of". In Kazhdan, Alexander (ed.). The Oxford Dictionary of Byzantium. Oxford and New York: Oxford University Press. pp. 1619–1620. ISBN 0-19-504652-8.
- Treadgold, Warren (1997). A History of the Byzantine State and Society. Stanford, California: Stanford University Press. ISBN 0-8047-2630-2.
- Wilskman, Juho (2009–2010). "The Campaign and Battle of Pelagonia 1259". Byzantinos Domos. 17–18: 131–174. ISSN 1106-1901.
- Wolff, Robert Lee (1969) [1962]. "The Latin Empire of Constantinople, 1204–1261". In Setton, Kenneth M.; Wolff, Robert Lee; Hazard, Harry W. (eds.). A History of the Crusades, Volume II: The Later Crusades, 1189–1311. Vol. 2 (Second ed.). Madison, Milwaukee, and London: University of Wisconsin Press. pp. 186–233. ISBN 0-299-04844-6.
