= 1263 =

1263 in various calendars
Gregorian calendar	1263; MCCLXIII
Ab urbe condita	2016
Armenian calendar	712; ԹՎ ՉԺԲ
Assyrian calendar	6013
Balinese saka calendar	1184–1185
Bengali calendar	669–670
Berber calendar	2213
English Regnal year	47 Hen. 3 – 48 Hen. 3
Buddhist calendar	1807
Burmese calendar	625
Byzantine calendar	6771–6772
Chinese calendar	壬戌年 (Water Dog); 3960 or 3753 — to — 癸亥年 (Water Pig); 3961 or 3754
Coptic calendar	979–980
Discordian calendar	2429
Ethiopian calendar	1255–1256
Hebrew calendar	5023–5024
- Hindu calendars
Vikram Samvat	1319–1320
Shaka Samvat	1184–1185
Kali Yuga	4363–4364
Holocene calendar	11263
Igbo calendar	263–264
Iranian calendar	641–642
Islamic calendar	661–662
Japanese calendar	Kōchō 3 (弘長３年)
Javanese calendar	1173–1174
Julian calendar	1263; MCCLXIII
Korean calendar	3596
Minguo calendar	649 before ROC 民前649年
Nanakshahi calendar	−205
Thai solar calendar	1805–1806
Tibetan calendar	阳水狗年 (male Water-Dog); 1389 or 1008 or 236 — to — 阴水猪年 (female Water-Pig); 1390 or 1009 or 237

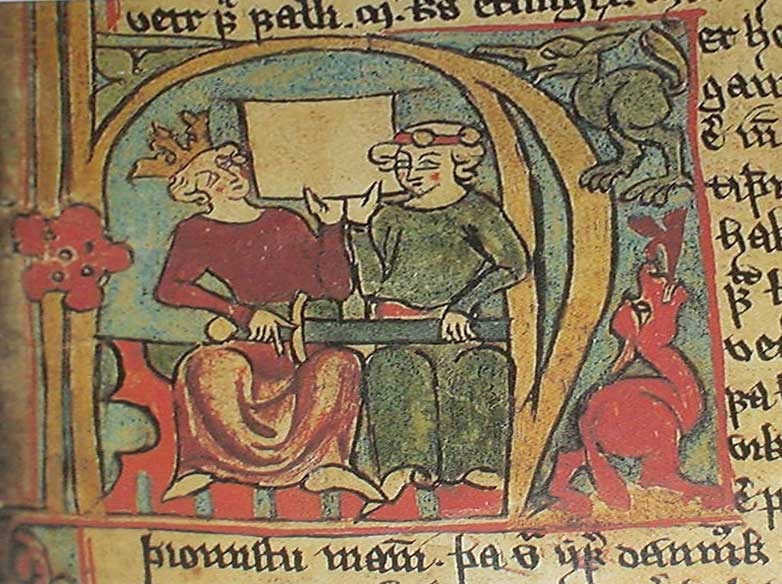
King Haakon IV of Norway (left) is succeeded by his son Magnus VI "the Law-mender")

Year 1263 (MCCLXIII) was a common year starting on Monday of the Julian calendar.

== Events ==
=== By place ===
==== Byzantine Empire ====
- Before July – Battle of Settepozzi: A Byzantine-Genoese fleet (some 50 galleys) is routed by the Venetians near Spetses in the Argolic Gulf, who capture four ships and inflict considerable casualties. Later, the Genoese that survive the battle managed to capture Chania on Crete. They receive orders to avoid direct confrontations with the Venetian fleet, but instead are engaged in raiding against the Venetian merchant convoys in the Euripus Strait.
- Summer – Emperor Michael VIII Palaiologos sends a Byzantine expeditionary force (some 3,500 men) led by his half-brother, Constantine Palaiologos, to the Peloponnese in southern Greece. The army is transported to Monemvasia on Genoese ships, while a small Byzantine fleet is sent to harass the Latin island holdings in Euboea and the Cyclades. After arriving at Monemvasia, Constantine lays siege to Sparta, while the Byzantine fleet seizes the southern coast of Laconia.
- Battle of Prinitza: Constantine Palaiologos marches the Byzantine army up the rivers Eurotas and Alfeios towards the Achaean capital, Andravida. At a narrow pass at Prinitza (near Ancient Olympia) in Elis, the Byzantines are attacked by Achaean forces (some 300 horsemen) under John of Katavas, who inflict a resounding defeat upon them; many Byzantine soldiers are killed. Constantine himself barely escapes with his life, and flees with the remainder of his army to the safety of Mystras.

==== Europe ====
- July – Scottish–Norwegian War: King Haakon IV of Norway ("the Old") assembles a fleet (some 120 warships), and sets sail to defend the Hebrides, in an attempt to reassert Norwegian sovereignty over the Western Isles of Scotland. Haakon stops at the Isle of Arran, where in August negotiations are started with the 21-year-old King Alexander III of Scotland. The talks are prolonged by the Scots until the autumn storms begin.
- September 12 – Mindaugas (or Mendog), the only Christian king of Lithuania, is assassinated by his cousin Treniota. The country reverts to paganism and loses its status as a kingdom. Treniota usurps the throne (until 1264).
- October 2 – Battle of Largs: Scottish forces under Alexander Stewart rout a Viking invasion force led by Haakon IV at Largs in North Ayrshire. The battle is inconclusive. On the morning of October 3, the Norwegians return to collect their dead and burn their beached ships. By the end of October, the Viking fleet reaches Orkney, where Haakon becomes ill and dies at the Bishop's Palace, on December 16.
- December – Magnus VI ("the Law-mender") succeeds his father Haakon IV as King of Norway. The chieftains of the eastern part of Iceland become the last to pledge fealty to Magnus, bringing a more complete end to the Icelandic Commonwealth and the Age of the Sturlungs.
- Winter – Reconquista: King Alfonso X of Castile ("the Wise") conquers Niebla from the Moors, terminating any Muslim presence in the western region of Spain.
- Reconquista – King James I of Aragon ("the Conqueror") captures Crevillent from the Moors and it becomes a part of the Kingdom of Valencia.

==== England ====
- April – Simon de Montfort, 6th Earl of Leicester, newly returned from exile, takes control of southern England. In early May he summons a meeting of rebel barons at Oxford.
- July 16 – Rebels occupy London.
- Baronial forces led by Robert de Ferrers and Henry de Montfort lay siege to Worcester. The attackers finally enter the city and are allowed to sack it. They kill most of the Jewish community as part of the targeting of Jews during the conflict with the Barons by allies of de Montfort.
- October 2 – King Henry III of England travels to Boulogne for an attempt to broker peace with his barons by King Louis IX of France.

==== Levant ====
- April 4 – Egyptian forces led by Sultan Baibars (or Abu al-Futuh) attack Acre; there is severe fighting outside the walls, in which the seneschal, Geoffrey of Sergines, is badly wounded. Baibars is not yet ready to besiege the city and begins a major campaign to eliminate the Crusader kingdom of Jerusalem, the county of Tripoli and the principality of Antioch.

=== By topic ===
==== Arts and Culture ====
- The Savoy Palace is constructed in London by Peter II, Count of Savoy.

==== Education ====
- Presumed date – Balliol College is established in the University of Oxford (England) by John I de Balliol on its modern-day site.

==== Markets ====
- The Lord Edward, son and heir of Henry III of England, seizes £10,000 which had been deposited to the trust of the Knights Templar in London by foreign merchants and English magnates.
- The Bonsignori firm gains the full market of the transfer of fiscal revenue from the papal estates to Rome.

==== Religion ====
- July 20–24 – Nahmanides, Spanish chief rabbi, defends the Talmud in an important debate (the Disputation of Barcelona) against Pablo Christiani, before James I of Aragon.
- Probable date – The doctrines of Joachim of Fiore, French hermit and theologian, are condemned as heresy by the Catholic Church Synod of Arles.

== Births ==
- January 22 – Ibn Taymiyyah, Syrian philosopher (d. 1328)
- February 8 – Afonso of Portugal, Lord of Portalegre, Portuguese prince (d. 1312)
- March 20 – Yolande of Dreux, queen consort of Scotland (d. 1330)
- Henry III, German nobleman (House of Gorizia) (d. 1323)
- Ingeborg of Sweden, countess of Holstein-Plön (d. 1292)
- Juliana FitzGerald, Lady of Thomond, Norman-Irish noblewoman (d. 1300)
- Napoleone Orsini, Italian cardinal and diplomat (d. 1342)
- Philip of Chieti, Flemish nobleman and knight (d. 1308)
- Roseline of Villeneuve, French Carthusian nun and saint (d. 1329)
- Theobald II, Duke of Lorraine (or Thiebaut), German nobleman (d. 1312)
- Tolberto III da Camino, Italian nobleman and condottiero (d. 1317)
- Zhongfeng Mingben, Chinese Buddhist master (d. 1323)

== Deaths ==
- January 7 – Agnes of Merania, duchess of Carinthia (b. 1215)
- January 16 – Shinran, founder of Jōdo Shinshū (Shin Buddhism) (b. 1173)
- March 19 – Hugh of Saint-Cher, French friar and bishop (b. 1200)
- April 20 – John I, Count of Holstein-Kiel, German nobleman (House of Schauenburg)
- June 7 – Boniface, Savoyan nobleman (House of Savoy) (b. 1245)
- September 12 – Mindaugas (or Mendog), king of Lithuania, assassinated (b. 1203)
- November 14 – Alexander Nevsky, Grand Prince of Novgorod
- November 20(?) – Martino della Torre, Italian nobleman and condottiero
- December 16 – Haakon IV of Norway ("the Old"), king of Norway (b. 1204)
- December 24 – Hōjō Tokiyori, Japanese nobleman (b. 1227)
- Al-Ashraf Musa, Ayyubid prince (emir) and ruler of Homs (b. 1229)
- Caesarius of Alagno, Italian priest, bishop and counsellor
- Gilbert I de la Hay, Scottish nobleman, knight and regent
- Guy I de la Roche, duke of Athens and Thebes (b. 1205)
- John XIII bar Ma'dani, Syrian patriarch of Antioch
- Manuel I (Megas Komnenos), emperor of Trebizond
- Senana ferch Caradog, Welsh noblewoman (b. 1198)
