= Alice of Villehardouin =

Lady of Karytaina

- Lady of Karytaina
- Reign: 1222–1238
- Spouse: Hugh of Briel
- Father: Geoffrey I of Villehardouin
- Mother: Elizabeth of Chappes
- Religion: Roman Catholic

Alice of Villehardouin (French: Alix de Villehardouin) was the only daughter of Geoffrey I of Villehardouin, Prince of Achaea and his wife Elizabeth of Chappes. She was Lady of Karytaina through her wedding.

Around 1222 Alice was married to Hugh of Briel, the second lord of the Barony of Karytaina and a man greatly appreciated by her father. Karytaina was the third largerst lordship of the Principality holding 22 knightly fiefs, coming close after Patras and Akova (24 fiefs each). At 1222 Hugh bestowed one third of his lands in France to the Abbey of Larrivour while he sold all his other possessions on Bouy with the approval of Alice. Bouy was only 9 kilometres from the commune of Villlehardouin, the ancestral home of the Villehardouin family and these lands presumambly belonged to Alice according to the records of Larrivour.

Together they had one son Geoffrey of Briel that Alice christened after her fathers name. Hugh died on 1238 and Geoffrey succeeded his father as Baron of Karytaina. Alice was the only member of the Villehardouin dynasty of Achaea that gave birth to a son as her brother Geoffrey II was childless and William II had only daughters. However Geoffrey of Briel died on 1275 without heirs, thus bringing the line of Alice to an end.
