= Theodosius V =

Theodosius V or Theodosios V may refer to:

- Theodosius of Villehardouin, Greek Orthodox patriarch of Antioch from 1278 to 1283
- Theodosius V Dahan, patriarch of the Melkite Greek Catholic Church from 1761 to 1788
