= Theodosius of Antioch =

Theodosius of Antioch may refer to:

- Saint Theodosius of Antioch (4th–early 5th century), Christian ascetic, monk, and founder of monasteries near Antioch and Maraton
- Theodosius Romanus, Syriac Orthodox patriarch of Antioch (887–896)
- Theodosius I of Antioch, Greek Orthodox patriarch of Antioch (870–890)
- Theodosius II of Antioch, Greek Orthodox patriarch of Antioch (936–943)
- Theodosius III of Antioch, Greek Orthodox patriarch of Antioch (1057–1059)
- Theodosius IV of Antioch, Greek Orthodox patriarch of Antioch (1269–1276)
- Theodosius of Villehardouin, Greek Orthodox patriarch of Antioch (1278–1283)
- Theodosius V Dahan, Melkite Greek Catholic patriarch of Antioch (1761–1788)
- Theodosius VI of Antioch, Greek Orthodox patriarch of Antioch (1958–1970)
