= Isabella de la Roche =

French noblewoman

- Coat-of-arms de La Roche
- Died: before 1291
- Noble family: De la Roche
- Spouses: Geoffrey of Briel; Hugh, Count of Brienne
- Issue: Walter V, Count of Brienne; Agnes
- Father: Guy I de la Roche

Isabella de la Roche (died before 1291) was a daughter of Guy I de la Roche. She was married twice, firstly to Geoffrey of Briel, Lord of Karytaina and then secondly to Hugh, Count of Brienne, having children only with her second husband.

== Life ==
Isabella's date of birth is unknown. She was the fifth of six children, her siblings included: John I de la Roche, William de la Roche and Alice de la Roche, who was regent of Beirut. Her father Guy was created Duke of Athens in 1260 by King Louis IX of France.

Isabella was married firstly in 1256 to Geoffrey of Briel, Lord of Karytaina. The couple were married for thirteen years however, no children were born in this time. In 1269, Geoffrey died of fever while commanding the garrison at Skorta. Upon Geoffrey's death, Isabella received the half of the barony as her dower, the other half going to the prince William II of Villehardouin as suzerain of the barony.

In 1277, Isabella was married a second time, this time to Hugh, Count of Brienne, a claimant to the thrones of Cyprus and Jerusalem. Their children became part of the Brienne claim to the Kingdom of Jerusalem. The couple had two children:

- Walter V of Brienne (d. 1311), Duke of Athens, Hugh's heir.
- Agnes of Brienne, married John, Count of Joigny

Isabella's date of death is unknown however, she did not outlive Hugh as he remarried in 1291 to Helena Komnena Dukaina, meaning Isabella must have died before 1291. Hugh and Helena had another daughter named Joanna. Through Isabella, her son Walter was able to claim Duchy of Athens in 1308 upon the death of his cousin Guy II de la Roche.
