= Messara =

Messara may refer to:

- John Messara, Australian horse breeder
- Messara Plain, an illuvial plain in southern Crete
- Messara horse, an animal breed

== See also ==
- Mesarea, historical region of Greece
- Mesaria (disambiguation)
