= Harold E. Lurier =

American historian, academic and translator

Harold Edmond Lurier (September 28, 1923 – June 30, 2000) was an American historian, academic and translator. He was known for his translations of Greek poetry and Chronicle of the Morea.

== Biography ==
Lurier was born in Worcester, Massachusetts. His paternal grandparents were Russian Jewish emigrants, and his maternal grandparents were Greek. After matriculating at Clark University in 1941, he served as a Greek interpreter for the U.S. Army during World War II from 1943 to 1946, then received his B.A. (1948), M.A. (1949) and Ph.D. (1955), in Medieval History, all at the University of Pennsylvania.

He first held an academic position at Princeton University, and then moved in 1956 to Pace University, where he spent the rest of his career in the Social Sciences Department. He retired in 1997.

Lurier won Pace's Kenan Award for Teaching Excellence in 1962. In the early 1970s, after tensions inflamed by a failed attempt to unionize the Pace faculty, Lurier collaborated with mathematician William J. Adams to develop the Lurier–Adams plan for faculty promotion and tenure decision-making at Pace.

Speculum praised his annotated translation of Chronicle of the Morea into English for its accuracy and for conveying "the flavor" of the Greek. Lurier is among a group of medievalists arguing that the original of the Chronicle was written in medieval French.

Lurier died in New York in 2000.

== Bibliography ==
- Crusaders as Conquerors: The Chronicle of Morea, Columbia University Press (1964), ISBN 978-0-231-02298-9. This book is an annotated translation from the original Greekvverse version of Chronicle of the Morea (Greek: Το χρονικόν του Μορέως), a famous historical account of the Frankish principality of Morea in southern Greece, written in the 14th century.
- The Emergence of the Western World /Book, Maps and Prints , (1994). Paperback: 288 pages, Publisher: Kendall/Hunt Publishing Company; Pap/Map edition (June 1994), ISBN 978-0-8403-9963-2
- Basic Facts of History of Western Civilization, Prehistory to 1600, 63 pages, general editor: John E. Flaherty. Published 1963 by Collier Books in New York.
