= Renaud of Briel =

- Baron of Karytaina
- Reign: 1209–around 1222
- Predecessor: None
- Successor: Hugh of Briel
- Died: around 1222

Renaud of Briel, in older literature Renaud of Bruyères, was a French knight and the first lord of the Barony of Karytaina in the Principality of Achaea, in Frankish Greece.

Hailing from Briel-sur-Barse in the French province of Champagne, Renaud had accompanied Geoffrey of Villehardouin on the Fourth Crusade, traveling directly to Syria rather than to Constantinople with the main crusader expedition. Renaud then went to Greece, where after five years of service as a knight, he was appointed lord of Karytaina (1209-1222) by Geoffrey of Villehardouin. Renaud’s younger brother Hugh joined him in Greece in 1215, married Geoffrey of Villehardouin’s only daughter Alix, and later succeeded Renaud as baron of Karytaina (ca. 1222-38).

== Sources ==
- Bon, Antoine (1969). La Morée franque. Recherches historiques, topographiques et archéologiques sur la principauté d'Achaïe [The Frankish Morea. Historical, Topographic and Archaeological Studies on the Principality of Achaea] (in French). Paris: De Boccard.
- Evergates, Theodore (1994). "The Origin of the Lords of Karytaina in the Frankish Morea". Medieval Prosopography. 15 (1): 81–114.
- Evergates, Theodore (2007). The aristocracy in the county of Champagne, 1100-1300. University of Pennsylvania Press.

New title	Baron of Karytaina; 1209–around 1222	Succeeded by Hugh of Briel
