= Hugh of Briel =

- Baron of Karytaina
- Reign: around 1222–1238
- Predecessor: Renaud of Briel
- Successor: Geoffrey of Briel
- Died: 1238
- Spouse: Alice of Villehardouin
- Religion: Roman Catholic

Hugh of Briel, in older literature Hugh of Bruyères, was a French knight and the second lord of the Barony of Karytaina in the Principality of Achaea, in Frankish Greece.

Hailing from Briel-sur-Barse in the French province of Champagne, Hugh inherited the Barony of Karytaina sometime around 1222 from his brother, Renaud of Briel. Hugh married Alice of Villehardouin, a daughter of the Prince of Achaea, Geoffrey I of Villehardouin. Hugh of Briel died in early 1238, not yet forty years old, and was succeeded by his son Geoffrey.

== Sources ==
- Bon, Antoine (1969). La Morée franque. Recherches historiques, topographiques et archéologiques sur la principauté d'Achaïe [The Frankish Morea. Historical, Topographic and Archaeological Studies on the Principality of Achaea] (in French). Paris: De Boccard.
- Evergates, Theodore (1994). "The Origin of the Lords of Karytaina in the Frankish Morea". Medieval Prosopography. 15 (1): 81–114.

Preceded by Renaud of Briel	Baron of Karytaina around 1222–1238	Succeeded by Geoffrey of Briel
