= John of Katavas =

John of Katavas (Greek: Ιωάννης Καταβάς) was a feudal lord and regent in the Principality of Achaea.

He was one of the feudatories of Geoffrey of Briel, the Baron of Karytaina. He fought against the Byzantines in the battle of Prinitza in 1263.

== Sources ==
- Bartusis, Mark C. (1997). The Late Byzantine Army: Arms and Society, 1204–1453. Philadelphia, Pennsylvania: University of Pennsylvania Press. ISBN 0-8122-1620-2.
- Geanakoplos, Deno John (1959). Emperor Michael Palaeologus and the West, 1258–1282: A Study in Byzantine-Latin Relations. Cambridge, Massachusetts: Harvard University Press. OCLC 1011763434.
