= Moraitis =

Family name

Moraitis (Greek: Μωραΐτης) is a surname of Greek origin, denoting origin from the Morea, also known as the Peloponnese. The genitive case form Moraiti (Μωραΐτη) is used for female name-bearers. Notable people with this surname include:

- Antonia Moraiti (born 1977), Greek water polo player and Olympic silver medalist
- Chris Moraitis (born 1962), senior Australian public servant
- Dimitrios Moraitis (born 1999), Greek basketball player
- George Moraitis (born 1970), American politician
- Nikolaos Moraitis (born 1957), Greek politician
- Panagiotis Moraitis (born 1997), Greek footballer

== See also ==
- Moraitis School, a private school in Athens, Greece
