= Mesaria =

Mesaria (Greek: Μεσαριά) may refer to:

- Mesaria, Andros, on List of settlements in the Cyclades
- Mesaria, Corfu, community within Agios Georgios, Corfu
- Mesaria, Santorini, subdivision of Santorini

== See also ==
- Mesarea, historical region of Greece
- Messara (disambiguation)
