= Geoffrey II of Villehardouin =

Geoffrey II Geoffroi II
- Prince of Achaea
- Coat of Arms of the Principality of Achaea
- Reign: c. 1229-1246
- Predecessor: Geoffrey I
- Successor: William II
- Born: c. 1195; Unknown
- Died: after May 6, 1246; Unknown
- Burial: Church of St James, Andravida
- Spouse: Agnes of Courtenay
- Issue: None
- Dynasty: Villehardouin
- Father: Geoffrey I
- Mother: Elisabeth of Chappes

Geoffrey II of Villehardouin (French: Geoffroi II de Villehardouin) (c. 1195- after May 6, 1246) was the third prince of Achaea (c. 1229-1246). He battled in the imperial capital three times.

== Early years ==
Geoffrey was born as the eldest son of Geoffrey of Villehardouin, a French knight from Champagne and his wife, Elisabeth of Chappes. His father entered the Fourth Crusade in 1205, later conquered a significant part of the Peloponnese and seized the throne of the Principality of Achaea following the death of its first prince, William I (1205–1209).

His marriage occurred during 1217.

== His reign ==
Geoffrey II took the throne by 1230.

In July 1237 he gave the Teutonic Knights a hospital in Andravida.

Geoffrey II died in 1246 and was buried in his capital, Andravida, in the church of the monastery of St. Jacob.

== See also ==
- Principality of Achaea
- Chronicle of Morea

Regnal titles
Preceded by Geoffrey I	Prince of Achaea c. 1229–1246	Succeeded by William II
