= Val-d'Auzon =

Commune in Grand Est, France

- Commune
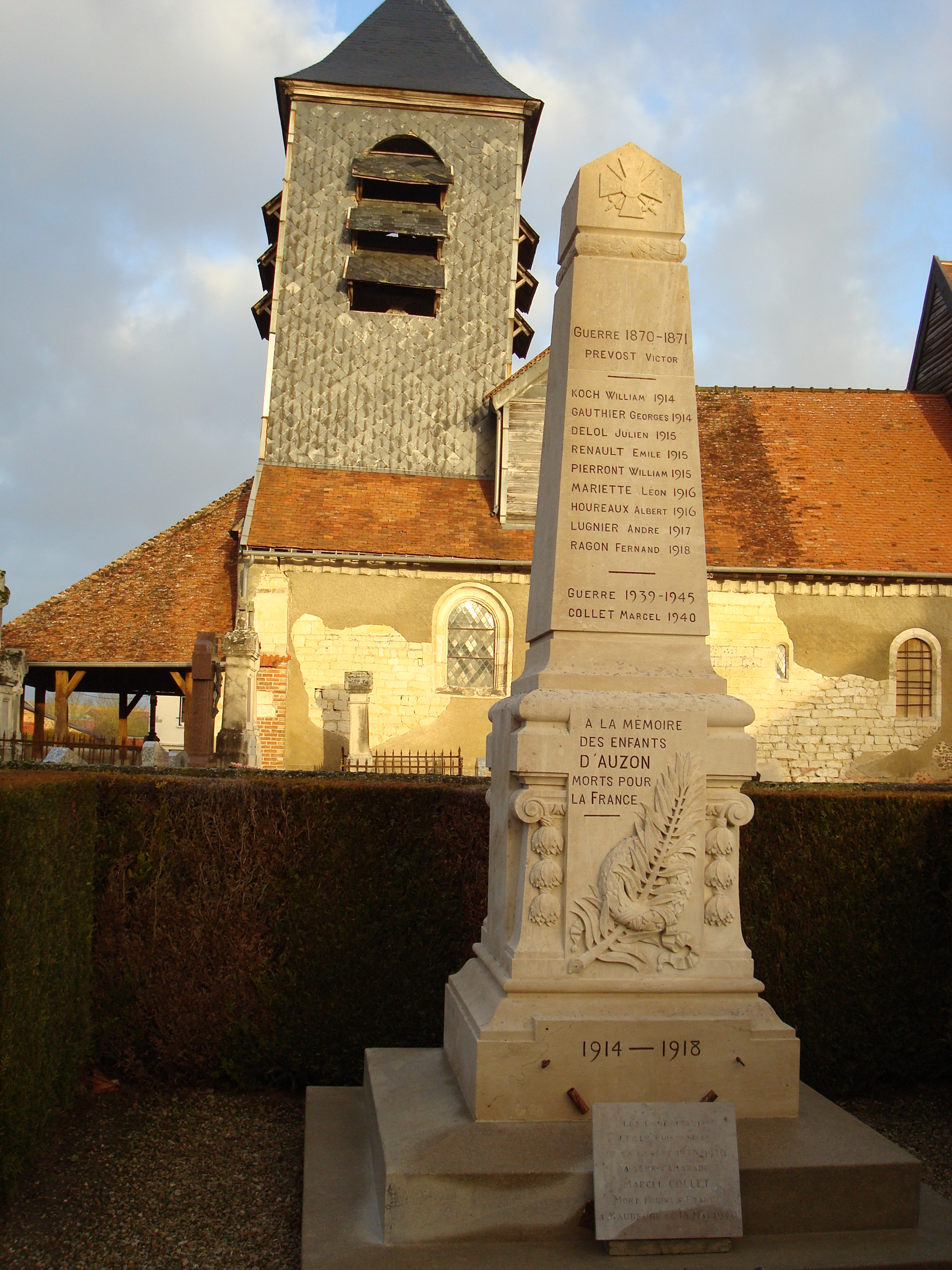
- Church and war memorial
- Location of Val-d'Auzon
- Location within France Location within Grand Est
- Coordinates: 48°24′28″N 4°21′50″E
- Country: France
- Region: Grand Est
- Department: Aube
- Arrondissement: Troyes
- Canton: Brienne-le-Château

Government
  - Mayor (2020–2026): John Jailliard
- Area^{1}: 27.58 km^{2} (10.65 sq mi)
- Population (2023): 356
  - Density: 12.9/km^{2} (33.4/sq mi)
- Time zone: UTC+01:00 (CET)
  - Summer (DST): UTC+02:00 (CEST)
- INSEE/Postal code: 10019 /10220
- ^{1} French Land Register data, which excludes lakes, ponds, glaciers > 1 km^{2} (0.386 sq mi or 247 acres) and river estuaries.

Val-d'Auzon (French pronunciation: [val dozɔ̃]) is a commune in the Aube department in north-central France. It is approximately 30 kilometres northeast of Troyes.

It was created on 1 May 1972 from the amalgamation of the communes of Auzon-les-Marais, Montangon and Villehardouin.

== Population ==
Historical population
Year	Pop.	±% p.a.
1968	434	—
1975	417	−0.57%
1982	342	−2.79%
1990	329	−0.48%
1999	351	+0.72%
2007	394	+1.46%
2012	398	+0.20%
2017	381	−0.87%
2023	356	−1.12%
Source: INSEE

== See also ==
- House of Villehardouin
- Communes of the Aube department
- Parc naturel régional de la Forêt d'Orient
