= Foissy =

- Commune
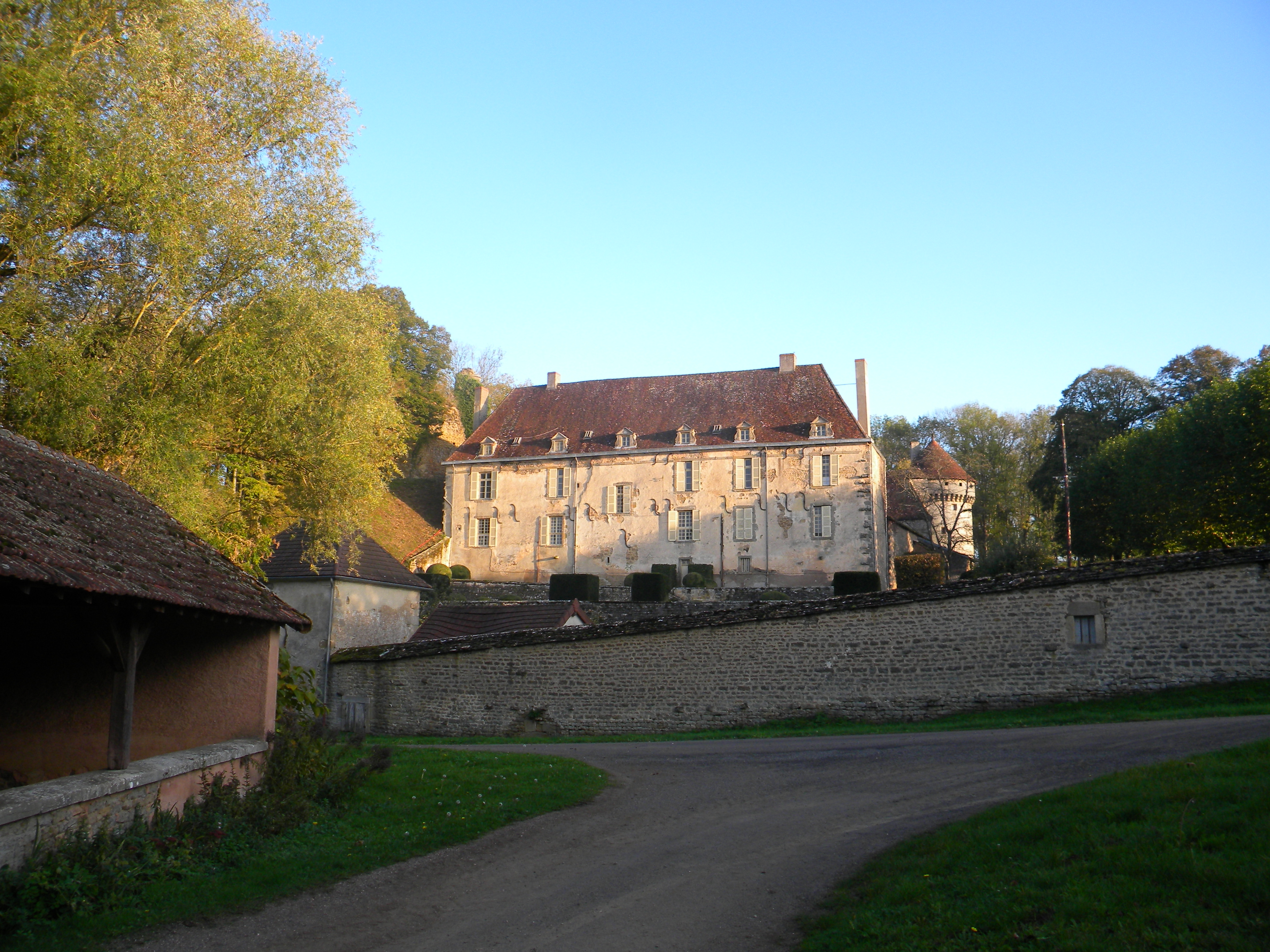
- The Château
- Location of Foissy
- Location within France Location within Bourgogne-Franche-Comté
- Coordinates: 47°07′23″N 4°33′47″E
- Country: France
- Region: Bourgogne-Franche-Comté
- Department: Côte-d'Or
- Arrondissement: Beaune
- Canton: Arnay-le-Duc
- Intercommunality: Pays Arnay Liernais

Government
  - Mayor (2020–2026): Martine Chambin
- Area^{1}: 15.12 km^{2} (5.84 sq mi)
- Highest elevation: 487 m (1,598 ft)
- Lowest elevation: 365 m (1,198 ft)
- Population (2023): 173
  - Density: 11.4/km^{2} (29.6/sq mi)
- Time zone: UTC+01:00 (CET)
  - Summer (DST): UTC+02:00 (CEST)
- INSEE/Postal code: 21274 /21230
- ^{1} French Land Register data, which excludes lakes, ponds, glaciers > 1 km^{2} (0.386 sq mi or 247 acres) and river estuaries.

Foissy (French pronunciation: [fwasi]) is a commune in the Côte-d'Or department and Bourgogne-Franche-Comté region of eastern France.

== Population ==
Historical population
Year	Pop.	±% p.a.
1968	195	—
1975	162	−2.61%
1982	146	−1.47%
1990	138	−0.70%
1999	135	−0.24%
2007	150	+1.33%
2012	158	+1.04%
2017	165	+0.87%
2023	173	+0.79%
Source: INSEE

== See also ==
- Communes of the Côte-d'Or department
