= Louis Briel =

American portrait painter (1946–2021)

Louis Briel (1945 – January 20, 2021) was an American painter and author from Richmond, Virginia. He specialized in portraits, especially ones of celebrities. Three of his works hang in the National Portrait Gallery, including portraits of Arthur Ashe and Dustin Lance Black. One of his paintings, a portrait of John F. Kennedy, was given to Robert F. Kennedy after his brother's assassination. Another portrait was given to Elton John, one depicting his recently deceased friend, Diana, Princess of Wales.

Briel was born and raised in Richmond. He graduated with honors from college and earned his master's at Harvard University. After returning to Richmond in the 1970s, he continued painting portraits and commissions, and lived in his hometown for the rest of his life, except for a brief period in Los Angeles. In 2012, Briel suffered a debilitating stroke, rendering the left side of his body numb. After that, he was only able to paint with his right hand. Briel died in 2021, just days after a solo exhibition of his works had begun.

== Biography ==
=== Early life ===
David N. Martin (1980), National Portrait Gallery

Bernard Louis Briel Jr. was born in 1945 in Richmond, Virginia. After graduating from Douglas S. Freeman High School, Briel attended Hampden–Sydney College, where he excelled in classes and graduated with honors. It was during his college years that Briel began an interest in painting celebrities. While a sophomore, he painted a portrait of President John F. Kennedy after the 1963 assassination. He gave it to Senator Robert F. Kennedy when the two met at an event criticizing massive resistance. According to Briel, after Robert F. Kennedy shook his hand, he didn't wash it for a week. The portrait would later hang in the Atkinson Museum at Hampden–Sydney College, after being found in an elderly man's belongings. In response, Briel said "I always like to know where my paintings end up. They're sort of like children that run away from home."

He earned his master's in classical philology at Harvard University where he also taught classics as a teaching fellow. His art studies took place at the American Academy in Rome. Afterwards, he moved to Boston, working under Anne Tabachnick and Morton Sacks. He began working as a fundraiser at Hampden–Sydney College. In the 1970s, Briel moved back to Richmond where his home doubled as a studio and art gallery.

=== Career ===
Briel began focusing more on painting, and during the 1990s, his works became more popular as he painted well-known figures in addition to commissions. He moved to Los Angeles for a few years and befriended artist David Hockney and author Doris Kearns Goodwin. The reason for Briel moving to Los Angeles probably had something to do with the amount of celebrities in that state. Briel eventually moved back to Richmond, where he purchased an apartment in Jackson Ward. He continued his work on celebrity portraits in Richmond, while also painting commissions.

During his first visit to the National Portrait Gallery (NPG) in Washington, D.C., Briel said "God, wouldn't it be wonderful to have a painting here? I know that’ll never happen." He befriended fellow Virginian Arthur Ashe, whom he painted. After Ashe's death in 1993, the portrait was donated to the Smithsonian Institution. That same year the United States House of Representatives acquired Briel's portrait of Representative Thomas J. Bliley Jr..

Following the death of Diana, Princess of Wales, in 1997, Briel painted a portrait of her. He sent it to Elton John, a close friend of Diana, which was brought along on his next tour. Elton John would have the portrait hung in his dressing room at each venue. Another celebrity who received a painting after the loss of a loved one was Carol Burnett, whose daughter Carrie Hamilton died in 2002. Other people Briel painted portraits of include Bette Davis, Sophia Loren, Keanu Reeves, and Dustin Lance Black, which is one of three portraits by Briel to hang in the NPG, the others being Ashe and Richmond businessman David N. Martin.

Briel wrote two novels during a sabbatical: Braided Shame: A Mystery Novel and Sunset and Vine. He returned to painting until 2012 when he suffered a stroke. While recovering, in 2014 he found out the NPG had bought another one of his paintings, giving him some inspiration during a dark period of his life. He had long-lasting effects from the stroke, mostly on the left side of his body, and was only able to paint with his right hand. Briel told one reporter "I'm painting in my head all the time, whether it goes on canvas or not." On January 20, 2021, Briel died at the age of 75, just five days after a solo exhibition of his work began in Richmond.

== Bibliography ==
- Braided Shame: A Mystery Novel, CreateSpace Independent Publishing Platform, 2008, ISBN 9781439207901
- Sunset and Vine, CreateSpace Independent Publishing Platform, 2010, ISBN 9781450534369

== See also ==
- List of American artists 1900 and after
- Visual art of the United States
