= Skorta =

Area of Arcadia in the Peloponnese

Map of the Peloponnese with its principal locations during the late Middle Ages

Skorta (Greek: τὰ Σκορτὰ, French: Escorta) was a name used in the 13th and 14th centuries, during the period of Frankish rule in the Peloponnese, to designate the mountainous western half of the region of Arcadia, which separated the coastal plains of the western (Elisian) and southwestern (Messinian) Peloponnese from the Arcadian plateau in the interior. The name is found chiefly in the various-language editions of the Chronicle of the Morea. It also appears as Skodra and Skorda (Σκορδὰ, Σκοδρὰ), in the chronicle of Pseudo-Dorotheos of Monemvasia.

The northern portion of this area, around Akova, was also known by the Greek name Mesarea (Μεσαρέα, a common term in Greece for inland locations, cf. Mesaria); in some cases, when juxtaposed with Mesarea, the term "Skorta" is limited to the southern portion, around Karytaina. The local population was renowned for its rebellious character, and never fully submitted to the Frankish Princes of Achaea. It frequently rose up, aided by the Byzantine Greeks of the province of Mystras. As a result, two of the most powerful baronies of Achaea were set up to control the region, the Barony of Akova in the north and the Barony of Karytaina (or Skorta) in the south.

The region of Skorta rose up in rebellion ca. 1302, when Prince Philip of Savoy raised new taxes on the local Greek gentry. Taking advantage of the absence of the Principality's marshal, Nicholas III of Saint Omer, with many troops on campaign in Thessaly, and with the aid of the Byzantines of Mystras, the rebels took and burned to the ground the castles of Saint Helen and of Crèvecoeur, and laid siege to the castle of Beaufort. When the Prince with the levies from his feudatories moved against the Greeks, however, the latter chose to withdraw, and Frankish rule was swiftly re-established over the region.

== Sources ==
- Bon, Antoine (1969). La Morée Franque: Recherches Historiques, Topographiques et Archéologiques sur la Principauté d'Achaïe (in French). Paris: De Boccard.
- Longnon, Jean (1969). "The Frankish States in Greece, 1204–1311". In Wolff, Robert Lee; Hazard, Harry W. (eds.). A History of the Crusades, Volume II: The Later Crusades, 1189–1311. University of Wisconsin Press. pp. 234–275. ISBN 0-299-06670-3.
