= Barony of Karytaina =

Medieval Frankish fiefdom in Greece

- Barony of the Principality of Achaea
- 1209–1275/89
- Map of the Peloponnese with its principal locations during the late Middle Ages
- Capital: Karytaina
- Area
  - Coordinates: 37°29′N 22°3′E
  - Type: Feudal lordship
- Historical era: Middle Ages
  - Established: 1209
  - Return to the princely domain: 1275/89

The Barony of Karytaina or of Skorta was a medieval Frankish fiefdom of the Principality of Achaea, located in the Peloponnese peninsula in Greece, centred on the town of Karytaina (Greek: Καρύταινα; French: Caraintaine; Italian: Caritena) in the mountainous region known as Skorta.

== History ==
The Barony of Karytaina was established ca. 1209, after the conquest of the Peloponnese by the Crusaders, and was one of the original twelve secular baronies within the Principality of Achaea. The Chronicle of the Morea mentions that the barony, centred on the mountain town of Karytaina, comprised twenty-two knight's fiefs. Karytaina was of particular strategic importance, as it controlled the southern part of the Skorta region and the ravine of the Alpheios valley, which was the main route from and into the central Peloponnese from the coastal plains of Elis.

The first baron was probably Renaud of Briel (or Brières), from the Champagne, who is attested in the Treaty of Sapienza in 1209. He was succeeded by his brother, Hugh of Briel, who married a daughter of Prince Geoffrey I of Villehardouin. His son and successor, Geoffrey of Briel, was the one who built the Castle of Karytaina in the middle of the century. Due to his participation in the War of the Euboeote Succession against the Prince William II of Villehardouin, and his absence from the Peloponnese in 1263–65 without authorization, as required by Achaean feudal law, he was dispossessed twice, but was each time pardoned and restored to the barony, albeit now no longer by inalienable right of conquest, but as a gift from the Prince. Geoffrey had no heirs, and on his death in 1275 the barony was split: one half remained with his widow, Isabella de la Roche, and the other reverted to the Prince's domain. Two pretenders to the barony appeared a few years later: a certain John Pestel, and Geoffrey's nephew, Geoffrey the Younger, who after much persistence managed to obtain the fief of Moraina.

Isabella married a second time, to Hugh, Count of Brienne, but he was more concerned of his Italian domains and spent more time there; after Isabella's death in 1279, Hugh became increasingly weary of holding a fief exposed to the incessant Byzantine raids into Arcadia. In 1289 he abandoned the barony and returned it to the domain in exchange for the fortress of Beauvoir (which he soon after exchanged again with John Chauderon for lands in Italy). The barony was then reconstituted in its entirety and granted by King Charles II of Naples to Isabella of Villehardouin and her husband Florent of Hainaut, at the occasion of their confirmation as Princess and Prince of Achaea. In 1303, Isabella granted the fortresses of Karytaina and Araklovon (French: Bucelet) to her infant daughter Margaret of Savoy, who renounced her claims in Achaea upon her marriage in 1324. In 1320, Karytaina and the eastern half of the ancient barony fell into the hands of the Byzantines under Andronikos Asen. Five years later, Prince John of Gravina tried to recover the fortress, but without success.

== Coinage ==
Along with the Barony of Damala, Karytaina is the sole barony of Achaea known to have minted coinage in its own name: a series of billon deniers issued in the 1290s by Helena Angelina Komnene, second wife and widow of Hugh of Brienne. These were marked with the legends HELENA D[E]I GRA[TIA] and CLARICTIA S[EMI] F[EUDI DOMINA], apparently in claim of her husband's half-barony. As A. Bon points out, however, this issue was struck with CLARICTIA and not CARITENA, and at any rate was made in her capacity as regent for the Duchy of Athens rather than as lady of Karytaina.

== Sources ==
- Bon, Antoine (1969). La Morée franque. Recherches historiques, topographiques et archéologiques sur la principauté d'Achaïe [The Frankish Morea. Historical, Topographic and Archaeological Studies on the Principality of Achaea] (in French). Paris: De Boccard. OCLC 869621129.
- Evergates, Theodore (1994). "The Origin of the Lords of Karytaina in the Frankish Morea". Medieval Prosopography. 15 (1): 81–113. JSTOR 44947037.
- Mallo, Alex G.; Preston, Irene Fraley; Seltman, A. J. (1994). Coins of the Crusader States, 1098–1291: including the Kingdom of Jerusalem and its vassal states of Syria and Palestine, the Lusignan Kingdom of Cyprus (1192–1489), and the Latin Empire of Constantinople and its vassal states of Greece and the Archipelago. New York: Attic Books Ltd. ISBN 0-915018-50-0.
- Miller, William (1921). Essays on the Latin Orient. Cambridge: Cambridge University Press. OCLC 457893641.
