= Theodosius of Villehardouin =

Theodosius of Villehardouin or Theodosios Prinkips (fl. 1260–1283) was the Greek Orthodox patriarch of Antioch as Theodosius V from 1278 to 1283. He amassed a considerable library of manuscripts, several of which are known today dispersed among different collections.

== Life ==
Theodosius was a member of the Villehardouin family of French origin, which ruled the Principality of Achaia. Emperor Michael VIII Palaiologos called him 'uncle', which may indicate that he was an uncle of William of Villehardouin, who stood as godfather to one of Michael's sons. He was a friend of George Pachymeres, whose writings provide important information about his career.

Theodosius may be a religious name. In his youth, he joined an Orthodox monastery on the Black Mountain outside of Antioch, the same monastery where the future Patriarch Germanus III of Constantinople was living. In 1259 or 1260, he joined the court of the Empire of Nicaea, possibly in connection with the imprisonment of William of Villehardouin and Michael's efforts to form an alliance with the Principality of Achaia. In 1260–1261, Michael VIII appointed Theodosius trustee of the dying Patriarch Nicephorus II.

Michael VIII named Theodosius archimandrite of the Pantokrator Monastery, probably shortly after the reconquest of Constantinople in 1261. His influence helped secure Germanus' appointment as patriarch in 1265. In that year, he escorted the princess Maria Palaiologina to the court of the Ilkhanate in order to finalize a Byzantine–Mongol alliance. Afterwards, he retired to the Hodegon Monastery.

Theodosius added a warning at the bottom of this page after acquiring the manuscript, Vindobonensis Historicus Graecus 73

In 1275, after the abdication of the Patriarch of Constantinople Joseph I, Theodosius was initially a favored candidate to succeed him, though ultimately John Bekkos was chosen, partly, according to Pachymeres, due to the latter's scholarly background, which, it was believed, would aid him in dealing with the Arseniate Schism and those opposed to church union. In 1278 he was again put forward by the bishops as the favored candidate for the Patriarchate of Antioch. Michael VIII was initially skeptical of the choice, doubting his commitment to church union, and only consented to his election after Pachymeres, following a private examination of Theodosius, vouched for him. As Patriarch he worked, in accordance with the Second Council of Lyon, to bring about the union of the churches, which angered Prince Bohemond VII of Antioch, since it caused some of his Orthodox subjects to obey the interdict imposed on Tripoli by its Catholic bishop. Following the accession in December 1282 of Andronikos II Palaiologos, who was opposed to church union, Theodosius left Constantinople for Antioch. He resigned in 1283 and went into voluntary exile in the Crusader states. A late notice claims that he became a monk at Mount Sinai.

== Library ==
There are at least eleven surviving manuscripts that are known to have been owned by Theodosius. He bequeathed his library to the unidentified church in which he was buried. His books are identified by the presence on the final page of a book curse—a warning or anathema against those who would remove the books from the church where he, "Theodosius the Prince", is buried. The collection was dispersed against his wishes between the 15th and 17th centuries.

Theodosius's library contained mainly biblical and theological texts, but also a copy of Aristotle. His manuscripts included:

- Laurentianus 87.24 is a copy of books 6–8 of Aristotle's Physics. It is much older than the 12th century.
- Parisinus Graecus 159, which contains the Minor Prophets with catena, was probably copied for Theodosius in Constantinople from the exemplar Vaticanus Graecus 1153.
- Vindobonensis Historicus Graecus 73, a copy of the Apostolic Constitutions, is a palimpsest containing an erased copy of Dexippus' Scythica as an undertext. It was acquired by Ogier Ghiselin de Busbecq in Constantinople.
- Vaticanus Graecus 401 is a 13th-century copy of Saint Athanasius and Gregory of Nyssa. It later belonged to Pope Nicholas V.
- Vaticanus Graecus 1219 is a 13th-century copy of Gregory Nazianzus, acquired by Antonio Carafa in the 16th century.
- Ottoboni Graecus 259 is a 13th-century manuscript containing Epiphanius of Salamis On Weights and Measures and Nicetas David Paphlago's verses on Nazianzus, acquired by Guglielmo Sirleto in the 16th century.
- Ambrosianus A 176 sup. is a 12th-century copy of Chrysostom's homilies on the Psalms.

== Bibliography ==
- Angold, Michael (1991). "The Latin Empire of Constantinople, 1204–1261: Marriage Strategies". In Judith Herrin; Guillaume Saint-Guillain (eds.). Identities and Allegiances in the Eastern Mediterranean after 1204. Routledge. pp. 65–86.
- Darrouzès, Jean (1977). "Review of Aristoteles graecus: Die griechischen Manuskripte des Aristoteles (Walter de Gruyter, 1976)". Revue des études byzantines. 35: 293–294.
- De Gregorio, Giuseppe; Gamillscheg, Ernst; Grusková, Jana; Kresten, Otto; Martin, Gunther; Mondrain, Brigitte; Wilson, Nigel (2020). "Palaeographical and Codicological Remarks on the Vienna Dexippus Palimpsest". In Fritz Mitthof; Gunther Martin; Jana Grusková (eds.). Empire in Crisis: Gothic Invasions and Roman Historiography (PDF). Holzhausen. pp. 5–13.
- Galadza, Daniel (2018). Liturgy and Byzantinization in Jerusalem. Oxford University Press.
- Hamilton, Bernard (1980). The Latin Church in the Crusader States: The Secular Church. Routledge. ISBN 9780860780724.
- Kotzabassi, Sofia (2013). "The Monastery of Pantokrator between 1204 and 1453". In Sofia Kotzabassi (ed.). The Pantokrator Monastery in Constantinople. De Gruyter. pp. 57–69.
- Lowden, John (1988). Illuminated Prophet Books: A Study of Byzantine Manuscripts of the Major and Minor Prophets. Pennsylvania State University Press.
- Mercati, Giovanni (1950). "Origine antiochena di due codici greci del secolo XI". Analecta Bollandiana. 68: 210–222. doi:10.1484/J.ABOL.4.01034.
- Pachymère, Georges (1984). Failler, Albert (ed.). Relations historiques. Corpus fontium historiae byzantinae. Vol. II (Livres IV–VI). Translated by Vitalien Laurent. Paris: Les Belles lettres. ISBN 978-2-251-32231-5.
- Papavarnavas, Christodoulos (2023). "1.10.3 Maria Palaiologina leaves Constantinople and travels to the Mongols, first as a bride-to-be (1265) and then as an ambassador (1307)". In Claudia Rapp; Johannes Preiser-Kapeller (eds.). Mobility and Migration in Byzantium: A Sourcebook. Vienna University Press. pp. 198–202.
