= Morea =

Former name of the Peloponnese peninsula

Coordinates: 37.6°N 22.2°E

Map of the medieval Peloponnese (Morea) with its principal localities

Morea (Greek: Μορέας or Μωριάς) was the name of the Peloponnese peninsula in Southern Greece during the Middle Ages and the early modern period. The name was used by the Principality of Achaea, the Byzantine province known as the Despotate of the Morea, by the Ottoman Empire for the Morea Eyalet, and later by the Republic of Venice for the short-lived Kingdom of the Morea.

== Etymology ==
There is some uncertainty over the origin of the medieval name "Morea", which is first recorded in the 10th century in the Byzantine chronicles.

Traditionally, scholars thought the name to have originated from the word morea (μορέα), meaning morus or mulberry, a tree which, though known in the region from the ancient times, gained value after the 6th century, when mulberry-eating silkworms were smuggled from China to Byzantium.

The British Byzantinist Steven Runciman suggested that the name comes "from the likeness of [the peninsula's] shape to that of a mulberry leaf".

== History ==
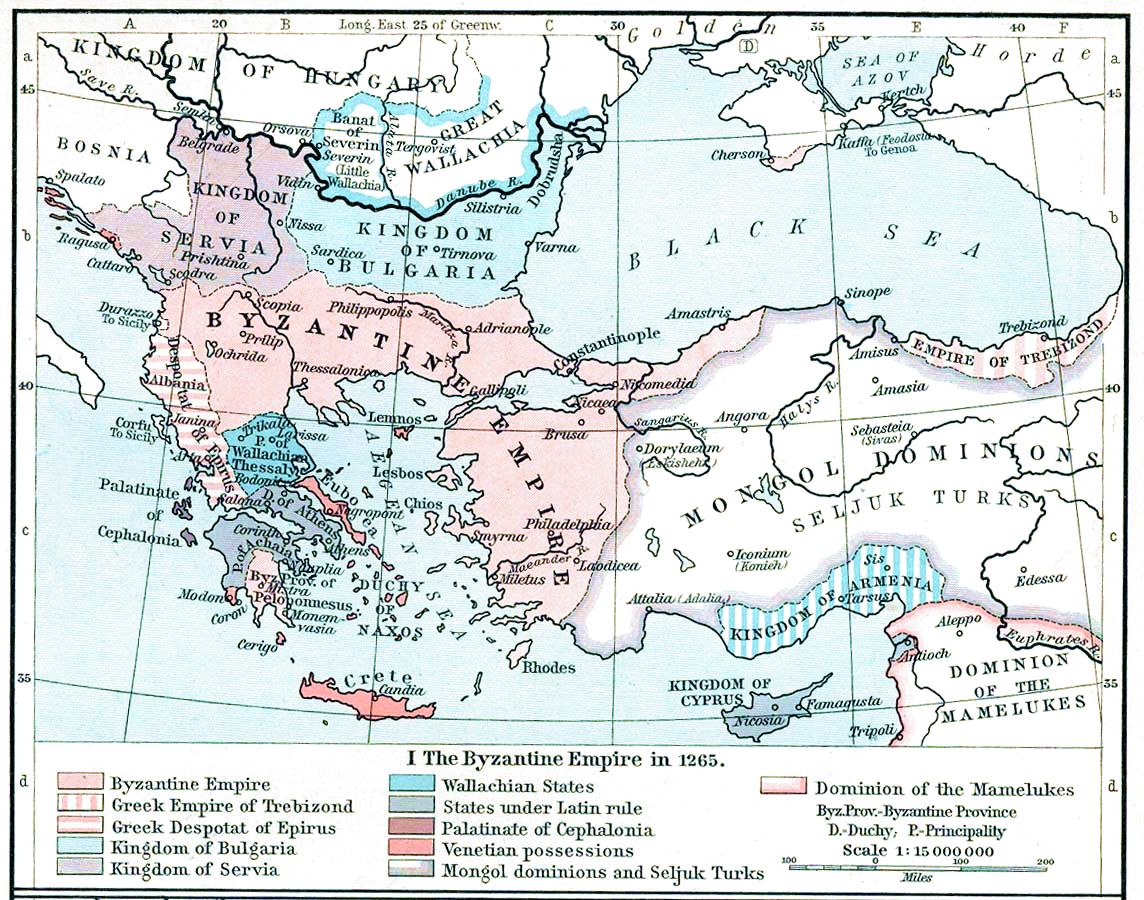
The Morea c. 1265 in its international context: the Byzantine Empire and the Latin states of Greece. Map from William R. Shepherd's Historical Atlas (1911)

After the conquest of Constantinople by the forces of the Fourth Crusade (1204), two groups of "Franks" (a term used by the Byzantines to refer to Catholic Western Europeans) undertook the occupation of the Morea. They created the Principality of Achaea, a largely Greek-inhabited statelet ruled by a Latin (Western) autocrat. In referring to the Peloponnese, they followed local practice and used the name "Morea".

The most important prince in the Morea was Guillaume II de Villehardouin (1246–1278), who fortified Mistra (Mystras) near the site of Sparta in 1249. After losing the Battle of Pelagonia (1259) against the Byzantine emperor Michael VIII Palaeologus, Guillaume was forced to ransom himself by giving up most of the eastern part of Morea and his newly built strongholds. An initial Byzantine drive to reconquer the entire peninsula failed in the battles of Prinitza and Makryplagi, and the Byzantines and Latins settled to an uneasy coexistence.

In the mid-14th century, the later Byzantine emperor John VI Kantakouzenos reorganized Morea into the Despotate of the Morea. Sons of the emperor with the rank of despotes were usually sent to rule the province as an appanage. By 1430, the Byzantines eventually recovered the remainder of the Latin part of the Morea, but in 1460 the peninsula was almost completely overrun and conquered by the Ottoman Empire. In these conquests, the coastal and port cities remained in the hands of the Venetians such as Monemvasia, Lepanto, Modon, Koron, but these places were captured during the reigns of Bayezid II and Suleiman the Magnificent. In July 1461, the last holdout, Salmeniko Castle, was taken.

The peninsula was captured for the Republic of Venice by Francesco Morosini during the Morean War of 1684–99. Venetian rule proved unpopular, and the Ottomans recaptured the Morea in a lightning campaign in 1714. Under renewed Ottoman rule, centered at Tripolitsa, the region enjoyed relative prosperity. The latter 18th century was marked by renewed dissatisfaction. Armed bands of the klephts emerged, undeterred by the brutal repression of the Orlov revolt. They waged guerrilla war against the Turks, aided both by the decay of Ottoman power and the emergence of Greek national consciousness. Ultimately, the Morea and its inhabitants provided the cradle and backbone of the Greek Revolution.

== Chronicle of the Morea ==
The anonymous, 14th-century Chronicle of the Morea relates events of the Latins' establishment of feudalism in mainland Greece following the Fourth Crusade. Despite its unreliability about historical events, the Chronicle is famous for its lively portrayal of life in the feudal community. The language in Greek versions is notable as it reflects the rapid transition from Medieval to Modern Greek. The original language of the Chronicle is disputed, but recent scholarship prefers the Greek version in MS Havniensis 57 (14th–15th century, in Copenhagen). Other manuscripts include the Ms Parisinus graecus 2898 (15th–16th century, at the Bibliothèque nationale de France, Paris). The difference of about one century in the texts shows a considerable number of linguistic differences due to the rapid evolution of the Greek language.

== See also ==
- List of traditional Greek place names
- Moraitis
- Navarino Massacre

== Bibliography ==
- Bon, Antoine (1969). La Morée franque. Recherches historiques, topographiques et archéologiques sur la principauté d'Achaïe (in French). Paris: De Boccard.
- Fine, John Van Antwerp (1994), The Late Medieval Balkans: A Critical Survey from the Late Twelfth Century to the Ottoman Conquest, University of Michigan Press, ISBN 978-0-472-08260-5
- Crusaders as Conquerors: the Chronicle of Morea, translated from the Greek with notes and introduction by Harold E. Lurier, Columbia University, 1964.
- M. J. Jeffreys, "The Chronicle of Morea: Priority of the Greek Version." Byzantinische Zeitschrift 68 (1975), 304–350.
- Teresa Shawcross, The Chronicle of Morea: Historiography in Crusader Greece (Oxford/New York: Oxford University Press, 2009) (Oxford Studies in Byzantium).
