= Briel-sur-Barse =

Commune in Grand Est, France

- Commune
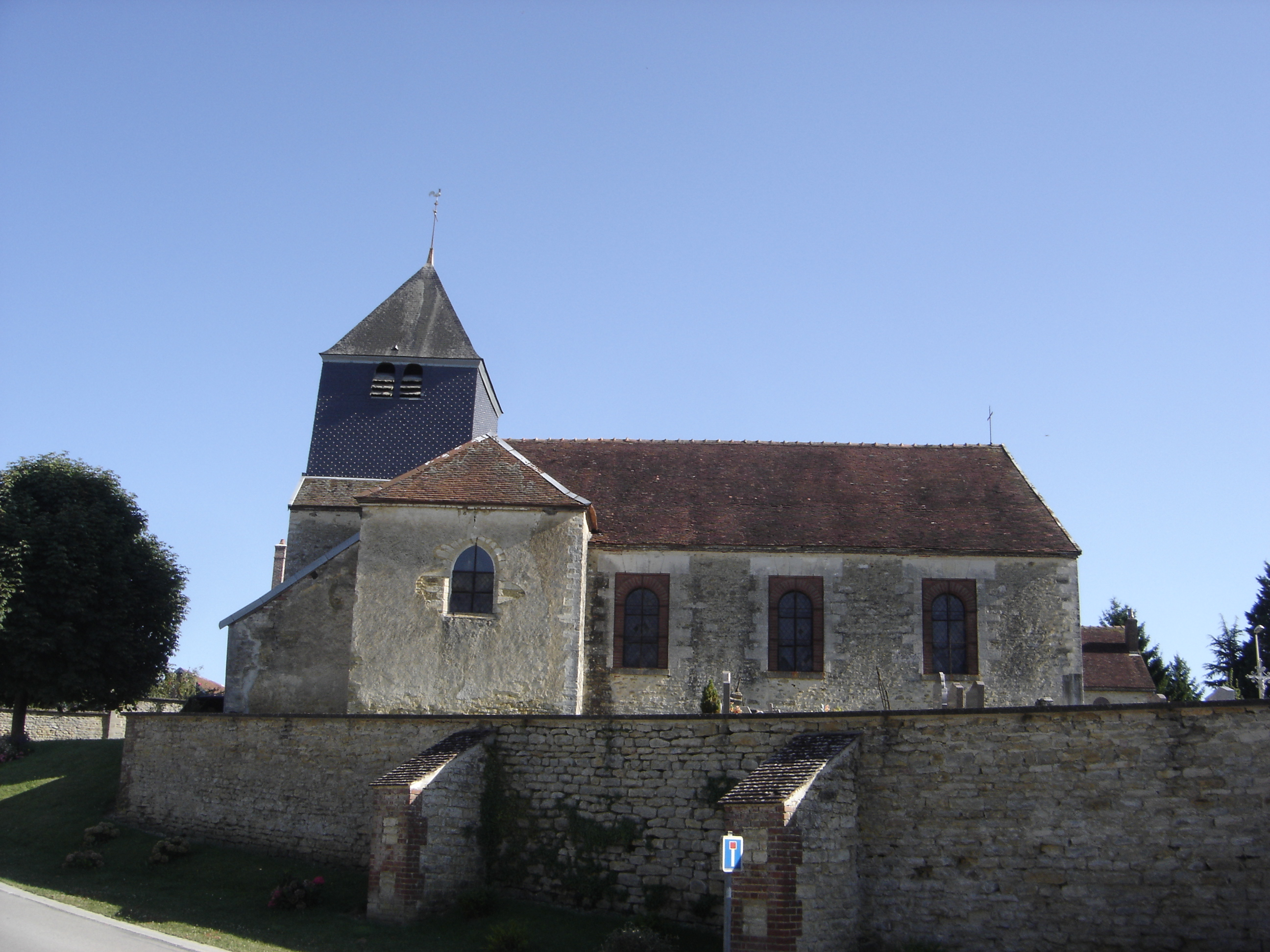
- The church in Briel-sur-Barse
- Location of Briel-sur-Barse
- Location within France Location within Grand Est
- Coordinates: 48°12′38″N 4°21′23″E
- Country: France
- Region: Grand Est
- Department: Aube
- Arrondissement: Troyes
- Canton: Bar-sur-Seine

Government
  - Mayor (2020–2026): Christophe Viard
- Area^{1}: 12.45 km^{2} (4.81 sq mi)
- Elevation: 138 m (453 ft)
- Population (2023): 195
  - Density: 15.7/km^{2} (40.6/sq mi)
- Time zone: UTC+01:00 (CET)
  - Summer (DST): UTC+02:00 (CEST)
- INSEE/Postal code: 10062 /10140
- ^{1} French Land Register data, which excludes lakes, ponds, glaciers > 1 km^{2} (0.386 sq mi or 247 acres) and river estuaries.

Briel-sur-Barse (French pronunciation: [bʁijɛl syʁ baʁs], literally Briel on Barse) is a commune in the Aube department in north-central France.

== Geography ==
The Barse flows through the commune.

== Population ==
Historical population
| Year | Pop. | ±% p.a. |
|---|---|---|
| 1968 | 143 | — |
| 1975 | 154 | +1.06% |
| 1982 | 145 | −0.86% |
| 1990 | 158 | +1.08% |
| 1999 | 160 | +0.14% |
| 2007 | 183 | +1.69% |
| 2012 | 220 | +3.75% |
| 2017 | 206 | −1.31% |
| 2023 | 195 | −0.91% |
Source: INSEE

== See also ==
- Communes of the Aube department
- Parc naturel régional de la Forêt d'Orient
