= Geoffrey I of Villehardouin =

Geoffrey I Geoffroi I^{er}
- Prince of Achaea
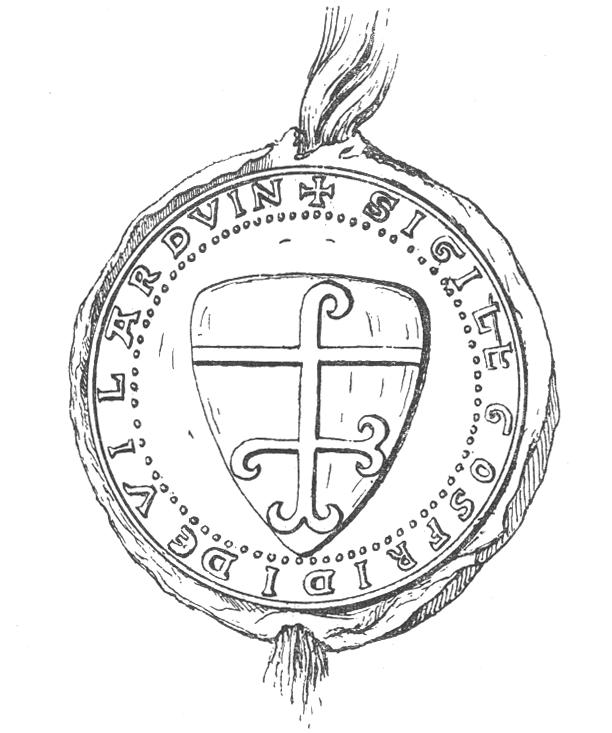
- Seal of Geoffrey I
- Reign: 1209/1210–c. 1229
- Predecessor: William I
- Successor: Geoffrey II
- Born: c. 1169; Unknown
- Died: c. 1229; Unknown
- Burial: Church of St James, Andravida
- Spouse: Elisabeth (of Chappes?)
- Issue: Geoffrey II, Alix, William II
- Dynasty: Villehardouin
- Father: John of Villehardouin
- Mother: Céline of Briel

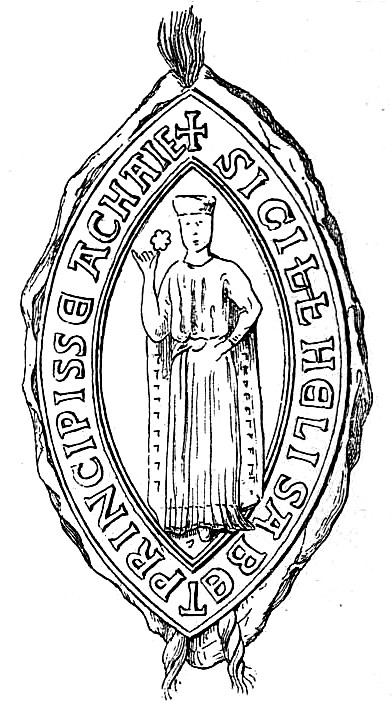
Seal of wife Elisabeth.

Geoffrey I of Villehardouin (French: Geoffroi I^{er} de Villehardouin) (c. 1169 – c. 1229) was a French knight from the County of Champagne who joined the Fourth Crusade. He participated in the conquest of the Peloponnese and became the second prince of Achaea (1209/1210–c. 1229).

Under his reign, the Principality of Achaea became the direct vassal of the Latin Empire of Constantinople. He extended the borders of his principality.

== Early years and the Fourth Crusade ==
Geoffrey was the eldest son of Céline of Briel and John of Villehardouin. He married one Elisabeth, who may be Elisabeth of Chappes, a scion of a fellow crusader family, an identification rejected by Longnon.

== Conquest of the Peloponnese ==
The Peloponnese in the Middle Ages

William of Champlitte was prince of Achaea (1205–1209) under the suzerainty of the king of Thessalonica. Geoffrey received Kalamata and Messenia as a fief from the new prince.

== Reign in Achaea ==
In 1208 William I of Achaea sought to claim an inheritance his brother had left to him. However, both the first prince of Achaea and his nephew died.

The Chronicle of the Morea narrates that Geoffrey only became prince of Achaea some time later.

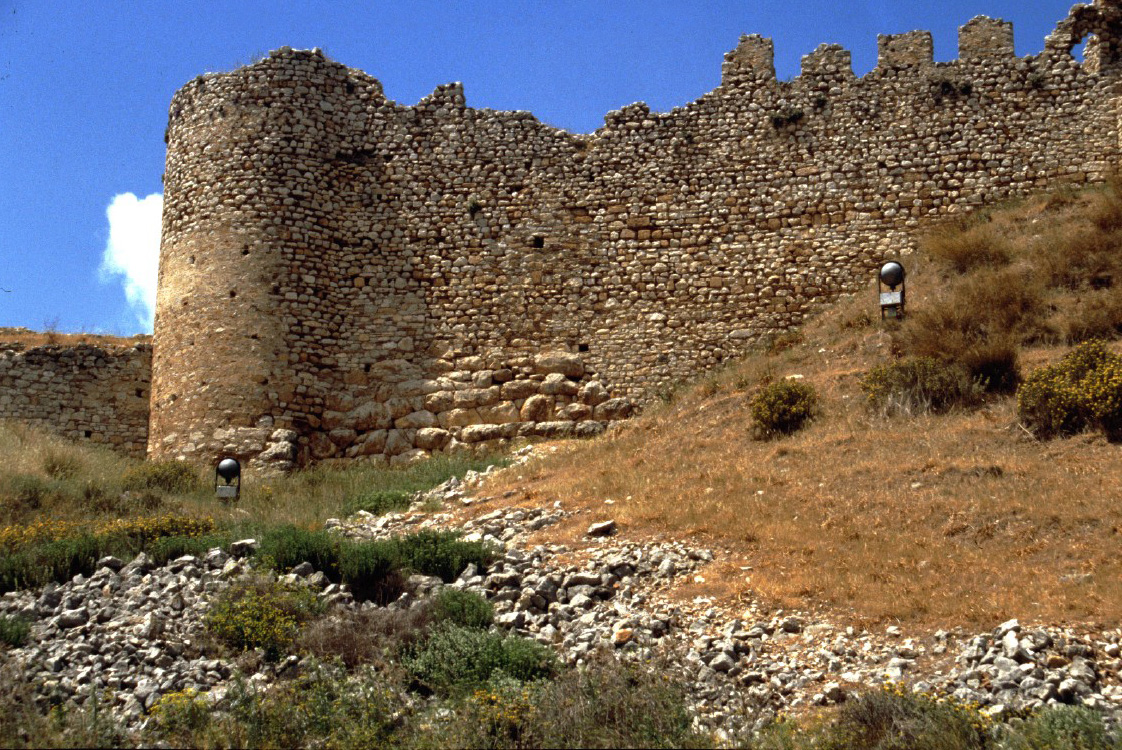
The medieval castle on Larissa Hill in Argos

Next the papal legate Cardinal Giovanni Colonna in 1218 excommunicated Geoffrey I. Upon the request of the local high clergy, it was confirmed during 1219.

Geoffrey died sometime between 1228 and 1230. He was buried in the Church of St James in Andravida.

== See also ==
- Fourth Crusade
- Principality of Achaea
- Chronicle of Morea

Regnal titles
Preceded by William I	Prince of Achaea; 1209/1210 – c. 1229	Succeeded by Geoffrey II
