= The Chronicle of Morea =

14th-century text about the Principality of Achaea

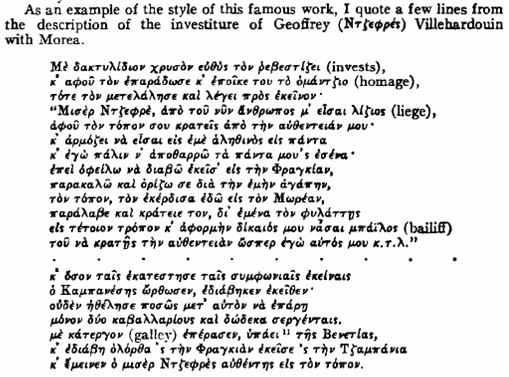
Text from The Chronicle of Morea

The Chronicle of Morea (Greek: Τὸ χρονικὸν τοῦ Μορέως) is a long 14th-century history text, of which there are four extant versions: in French, Greek (in verse), Italian and Aragonese. More than 9,000 lines long, the Chronicle narrates events of the Franks' establishment of feudalism in mainland Greece. West European Crusaders settled in the Peloponnese (called Morea at the time) following the Fourth Crusade. The period covered in the Chronicle was 1204 to 1292 (or later, depending on the version). It gives significant details on the civic organization of the Principality of Achaia.

== The extant texts of The Chronicle of Morea ==
The Greek text is the only text written in verse. The French, Italian and Aragonese texts are written in prose.

=== Greek text ===
The verses of the Greek text are written in a 15-syllable political verse. The verses are accented but not rhymed. It is written in the spoken Greek of the time, with the inclusion of several French words.

There are two parallel Greek texts, surviving in five manuscript copies:

- Ms Havniensis 57 (14th–15th century, Royal Library of Copenhagen) 9219 verses
  - Ms Taurinensis B.II.I, library of Turin, closely related to the Copenhagen text
- Ms Parisinus graecus 2898 (15th–16th century, at the Bibliothèque nationale de France, Paris) 8191 verses
  - Ms Parisinus graecus 2753, at the Bibliothèque nationale de France, and
  - Ms Bern 509 grec, both copies of the Paris version.

The Copenhagen text is considered older, and its language is more archaic. The more recent Parisian text is simpler in language and has fewer foreign words. The transcriber omitted several anti-Hellenic references, so the overall text expressed less contempt of Greeks.

The difference of about one century between the Copenhagen and Parisian version shows a considerable number of linguistic differences due to the rapid evolution of the Greek language. The text of the Copenhagen version describes events until 1292.

=== French text ===
- Royal Library of Belgium No 15702

This text is known under the title: "The Book of the Conquest of Constantinople and the Empire of Roumania and the country of the Principality of Morea", since in the incipit, it is indicated "C'est le livre de la conqueste de Constantinople et de l'empire de Romanie, et dou pays de la princée de la Morée"

Information in this text reaches until the year 1304.

=== Italian text ===
- Cronaca di Morea, is a summary that was compiled later than the previous texts and contains several mistakes. Its source is the text found in the Greek manuscript held in Turin.

=== Aragonese text ===
- Libro de los fechos et conquistas del principado de la Morea, was compiled at the end of the 14th century, in 1393, from the Greek version and other later sources, at the request of the Grand Master Jean Fernandez de Heredia of the Knights of St. John. It covers events to 1393.

== Which text is the original? Which version came out first? ==
It appears that the original text of The Chronicle of Morea has been lost. Although the Aragonese and Italian texts have been clearly identified as later texts, there is no widely accepted consensus on the priority of the Greek or French text.

== The author ==
The author of the original text of the Chronicle appears to be a Franc or a gasmoule (a French-Greek, born from a mixed French-Greek marriage, the word seems to have an etymology from garçon (boy) and mule). He appeared to admire the Franks (Crusaders) and have contempt of the local population and the Roman Empire. Notably, the author respects the citizenship of the Byzantine Greeks, calling them Romans (Ρωμαῖοι) (especially in verses 1720–1738).

== The significance of the Chronicle ==
The Chronicle is famous in spite of certain historical inaccuracies because of its lively description of life in the feudal community and because of the character of the language which reflects the rapid transition from Medieval to Modern Greek.

Polet explains that since the author admired the Franks and had contempt for the Byzantine culture, the Chronicle of Morea did not become part of popular culture and history after the Franks left the Peloponnese.

Numerous administrative laws and practices of the Principality of Achaia are mentioned in the Chronicle, making it a significant source on the Frankish period in Greece.

== Language of the Chronicle ==
Since the year of the Fall of Constantinople, 1453, marks the symbolic boundary between Medieval and Modern Greek, The Chronicle of Morea is generally classified under Medieval Greek. However, The Chronicle of Morea, along with the Ptochoprodromic poems and acritic songs are considered the beginnings of modern Greek literature. They are classified as part of both "Byzantine / medieval vernacular" and "(early) modern Greek" literature.

== The first editions in print ==
The first printed edition of the Chronicle was published in 1840 by J.A. Buchon. It contained the Greek text from Paris.

Buchon named the book Βιβλίον της κουγκέστας του Μωραίως (Book of the conquest of Morea), a different title than the text. The second printed edition of the Chronicle was that of the Greek text from Copenhagen, published by Buchon in 1845. In 1889 John Schmitt published both texts of the Copenhagen and Paris manuscripts side by side.

=== Translations ===
A 1964 translation of the Greek text by Harold E. Lurier.

=== The first text ===
The book begins with a prologue of 1302 verses. The first three verses are:

I will tell a tale to thee rehearse, a tale of import mighty
And if attention you do lend, I hope the tale will please you
T'is how the Frank by arms did gain the realm of fair Morea

== Editions of The Chronicle of Morea ==
- J. A. C. Buchon, Chroniques etrangères relatives aux expéditions françaises pendant le xiii siécle, first edition, Paris, 1840.
- J. A. C. Buchon, Recherches historiques sur la principauté française de Morée et ses hautes baronnies Le livre de la conqueste de la princée de la Morée, Paris, vol. ii, 1845.
- J. A. C. Buchon, Chroniques etrangères relatives aux expéditions françaises pendant le xiii siécle, Paris, 1875.
- A. Colantuoni, La Cronaca della Morea. Edizione e studio della versione francese, Napoli, 2017, [in Italian].
- C. Hopf, (ed.), "Versione italiana inedita della Cronaca di Morea", in: Chroniques gréco-romanes inédites ou peu connues, Berlin, 1873, pp. xlii-xlviii & 414–468.
- P. P. Kalonaros, (ed.), Τὸ Χρονικὸν τοῦ Μορέως. Τὸ ἑλληνικὸν κείμενον κατὰ τὸν κώδικα τῆς Κοπεγχάγης μετὰ συμπληρώσεων καὶ παραλλαγῶν ἐκ τοῦ Παρισινοῦ, Athens, 1940, [in Greek].
- J. Longnon, (ed.), Livre de la conqueste de la Princée de l ’amorée: Chronique de Morée (1204-1305), Paris, 1911, [in French].
- A. P. V. Morel-Fatio, Libro de los fechos et conquistas del principado de la Morea compilado por comandamiento de Don Fray Johan Ferrandez de Heredia, maestro del Hospital de S. Johan de Jerusalem - Chronique de Morée aux XIIe et XIVe siècles, publiée & traduite pour la première fois pour la Société de l'Orient Latin par Alfred Morel-Fatio, Genève, 1885, [in Spanish].
- J. Schmitt, Die Chronik von Morea. Eine untersuchung über das Verhältnis ihrer Handschriften und Versionen, München, 1889, [in German].
- J. Schmitt, The Chronicle of Morea, Τὸ Χρονικὸν τοῦ Μορέως. A history in political verse, relating the establishment of feudalism in Greece by the franks in the thirteenth century, edited in two parallel texts from the MSS of Copenhagen and Paris, with introduction, critical notes and indices, London, 1904.
- T. C. Shawcross, The Chronicle of Morea: Historiography in Crusader Greece, Oxford, 2009.
