= War of Curzola =

1295–1299 war between Venice and Genoa

- Part of the Venetian–Genoese wars
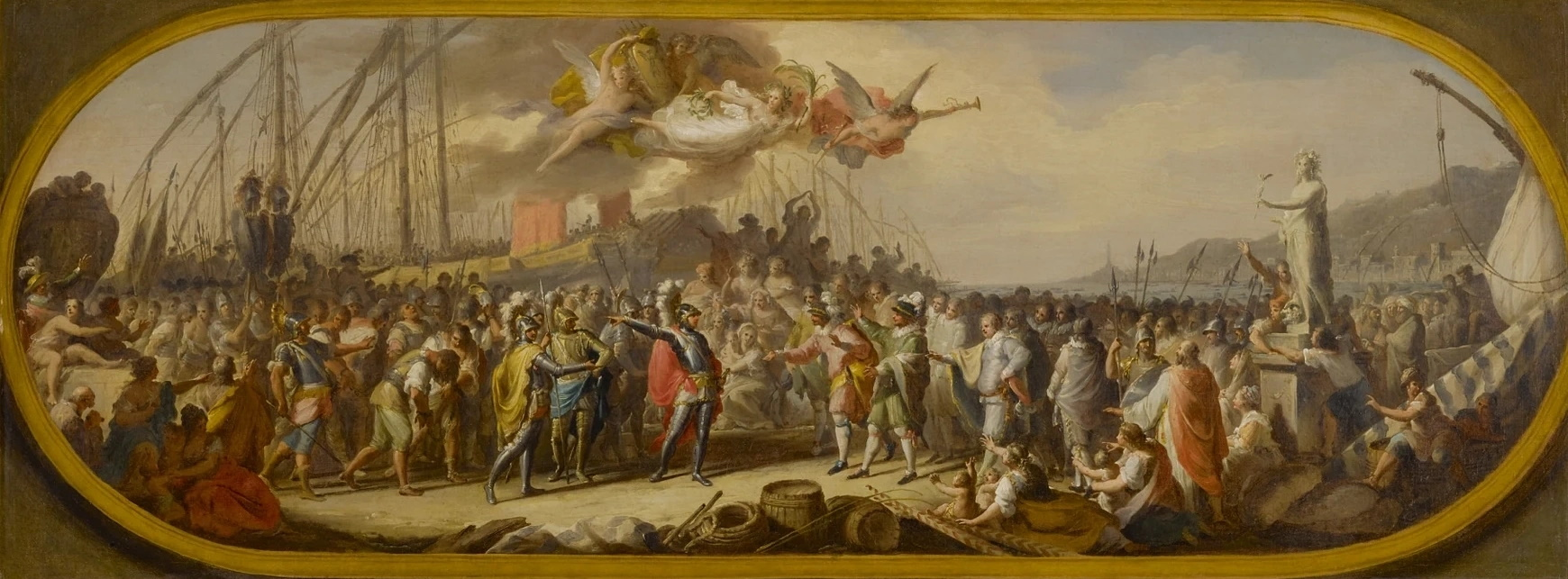
Date	1295–1299
Location	Aegean Sea, Black Sea, and Adriatic Sea, Byzantine Empire
Result	Genoese Victory

Belligerents
Republic of Venice	Republic of Genoa; Byzantine Empire(1295)

Commanders and leaders
Pietro Gradenigo; Roger Morosini; Giovanni Soranzo; Andrea Dandolo †	Lamba Doria; Andronikos II

Strength
40 war galleys 95 vessels	165 galleys

Casualties and losses
65 vessels destroyed 9,000 killed 5,000 captured	Unknown

The War of Curzola was fought between the Republic of Venice and the Republic of Genoa due to increasing hostile relations between the two Italian republics. Spurred largely by a need for action following the commercially devastating Fall of Acre, Genoa and Venice were both looking for ways to increase their dominance in the Eastern Mediterranean and Black Sea. Following the expiration of a truce between the republics, Genoese ships continually harassed Venetian merchants in the Aegean Sea.

In 1295, Genoese raids on the Venetian quarter in Constantinople further escalated the tensions, resulting in a formal declaration of war by the Venetians in the same year. A steep decline in Byzantine-Venetian relations, following the Fourth Crusade, resulted in Byzantine Empire favouring the Genoese in the conflict.

The Byzantines entered the war on the Genoan side. While the Venetians made swift advances into the Aegean and Black Seas, the Genoans exercised dominance throughout the war, finally besting the Venetians in the Battle of Curzola in 1298, with a truce being signed the next year.

== Background ==
The Fall of Acre in 1291 proved to be a devastating defeat both morally and militarily for Christians across western Europe. For Venice, however, the loss of the city was particularly tragic. Acre had had a significant Venetian population, and with the loss of the city, Venice had also lost a significant trade route for the transfer of eastern spices into Europe. This corresponds with the overall loss of the eastern spice trade in Europe during the Middle Ages as Muslim empires began to close off the traditional routes. Now unable to compete with Genoa, who were able to maintain their colonies in Azov and Crimea, Venice's economy was crippled.

Since the Fourth Crusade, Byzantine emperors continued to favour Genoa as a trading ally, rather than Venice. Because of this, by 1291, Genoa had the institutional power within the Byzantine Empire to blockade Venetians from passing the Bosphorus Strait, completely barring their access to the Black Sea. All of these factors coalesced into consecutive Genoese attacks on Venetian merchants and convoys in the Aegean, as well as significant raiding on Venetian Crete. Now, with the blockade of the Bosphorus, the raiding on Crete and the attacks on Venetian merchants in the Aegean, and, in a final flurry of Genoese aggression, a raid on the Venetian quarter in Constantinople in 1295, followed with the arrest of the surviving Venetians by the Byzantine Emperor, Andronikos II Palaiologos (r. 1282–1328), the Venetians had no choice but to formally retaliate, declaring war on both entities in the same year.

== Course of the War ==
Venice soon arranged a fleet of 40 war galleys. Captained by Roger Morosini, he sailed to Constantinople soon after the declaration of war and attempted to break the Genoese blockade. He soon captured the Golden Horn, Constantinople's inner harbour, and began attempts to take the city, targeting all Genoese and Greek shipping moving through the harbour. Andronikos, remembering the Fourth Crusade and fearing he would lose the city, soon made peace with Venice, arranging for the release of all imprisoned Venetians and the swift return of their confiscated property. Another Venetian fleet soon departed; this time captained by Giovanni Soranzo.

The goal of this fleet was to attempt to actually break past the Genoan Bosphorus and get into the Black Sea itself. Soranzo was successful. He managed to break the blockade and sail into the Black Sea to Crimea, capturing the large port of Caffa. The Genoese, however, were still determined to best the Venetians. From their still dominant position in the Aegean they began to launch several successful raids in the Adriatic itself, severely endangering Venetian supply lines.

Finally, in 1298, the Genoans decisively engaged the Venetians off the coast of Curzola (modern Korčula). In the Battle of Curzola, the Genoese navy won a clear victory, managing to sink 65 of the Venetians' 95 vessels, killing 9,000 Venetians and capturing another 5,000. The next year, the Genoans and the Venetians arranged an uneasy treaty, putting an inconclusive end to the four-year war.
