= Venetian–Genoese Wars =

Series of territorial conflicts between Genoa and Venice (13th-14th centuries)

Venetian-Genoese Wars
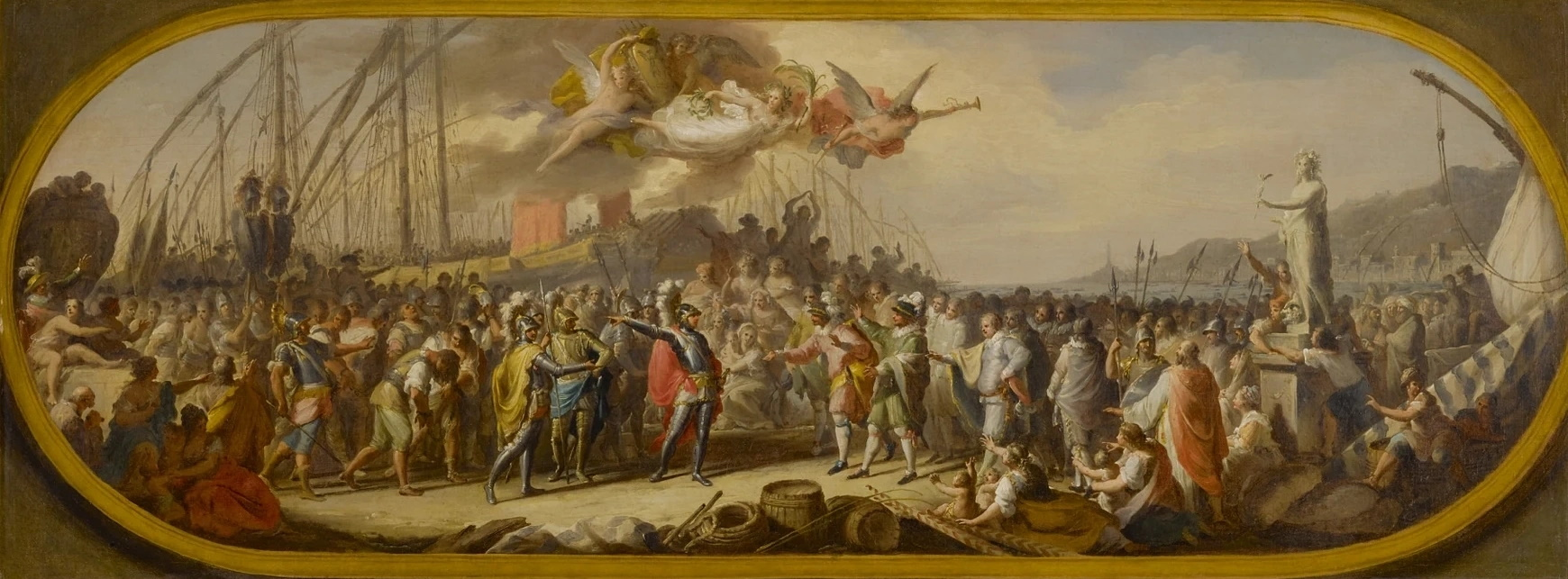
- The triumph of Lamba Doria in the Battle of Curzola
Date	First War (1256–1270); Second War (1294–1299); Third War (1350–1355); Fourth War (1378–1381)
Location	Eastern Mediterranean Sea and Black Sea
Result	Inconclusive, with the accumulation of many debts by the two maritime republics

Belligerents
Venetian Republic; Crown of Aragon; Duchy of Milan	Republic of Genoa; Byzantine Empire; Paduan Contado; Kingdom of Hungary

Commanders and leaders
First War Reniero Zeno; Lorenzo Tiepolo Second War Pietro Gradenigo; Giovanni Soranzo; Andrea Dandolo (POW) Third War Niccolò Pisani; Peter IV of Aragon Fourth War Vettor Pisani; Carlo Zeno; Andrea Contarini; Bernabò Visconti	First War Guglielmo Boccanegra; Michael VIII Palaiologos (1261–1268) Second War Lamba Doria; Andronikos II Palaiologos Third War Paganino Doria Fourth War Luciano Doria †; Pietro Doria †; Francesco I da Carrara; Louis I of Hungary

The Venetian–Genoese Wars were four conflicts between the Republic of Venice and the Republic of Genoa which took place between 1256 and 1381. Each was resolved almost entirely through naval clashes, and they were connected to each other by interludes during which episodes of piracy and violence between the two Italian trading communities in the Mediterranean Sea and the Black Sea were commonplace, in a "cold war" climate.

Starting in the 11th century, Venice and Genoa had built commercial empires which, in the 13th century, became thalassocracies so solid as to oust the other maritime republics and to make the two cities privileged interlocutors of state structures such as the Byzantine Empire, the Kingdom of Hungary, etc. In the second half of the 13th century the tensions between Venice and Genoa, exacerbated by the Venetian control over Constantinople following the Fourth Crusade, exploded. The first conflict, known as the War of Saint Sabas (1256–1270), was a Venetian victory, though it did not undermine the growing Genoese power in Constantinople and the Black Sea. The second conflict (1294–1299) recorded a revenge for the Ligurians, with significant military victories. After a temporary alliance against the Mongols during the siege of Caffa (1346), Venice and Genoa clashed again in the War of the Straits (1350–1355), during which Venice dragged in the Crown of Aragon, Genoa's emerging Tyrrhenian rival. This third war again ended in stalemate with a Genoese military victory at great cost. The fourth conflict, the War of Chioggia (1377–1381), saw Venice surrounded by various fronts, with the Genoese reaching the entrance to the Venetian Lagoon, but, with an enormous war effort, Venice achieved the final victory, saving the city from destruction, even without a debilitating economic outlay. Acts of piracy between the Venetians and Genoese (subject to French control in the meantime) continued until the Venetian victory at the Battle of Modon (1403). Thirty years later, the two republics faced each other again in the Battle of San Fruttuoso (1431), but in the context of the Wars in Lombardy and with Genoa then subject to the Visconti of Milan.

The real cause of the truce between Venice and Genoa starting in the 15th century was their involvement in systematic conflicts with other powers: for Genoa the confrontation with Aragon, then concluded by the subjugation of the Genoese to the Kingdom of Spain in the 16th century; for Venice the exhausting, centuries-old conflict with the Ottoman Empire. In general, the Ottoman threat to trade and the coasts of the entire Mediterranean, especially thanks to the alliance between the Sultan of Istanbul and the Barbary pirates, favored the rapprochement and collaboration between the two ancient rivals, e.g. in the Battle of Lepanto. At the same time, the decline in the share of world trade passing through the Mediterranean during the Age of Discovery thwarted the Italian republics' ambitions for commercial dominance and the resulting tensions. Despite a significant Genoese military superiority, this series of wars damaged the resources of both sides, leading Genoa into a long series of internal struggles, to the advantage of its neighbors.

== Background ==
The economic recovery that occurred in Europe starting from the 9th century, combined with the insecurity of land communication routes, meant that the main trade routes developed along the coasts of the Mediterranean Sea: in this context, and given the crisis of the central powers, some port cities of the Italian Peninsula were able to acquire ever greater autonomy, to the point of playing a leading role in the European scenario. The traffic of these cities reached Africa and above all Asia, effectively inserting itself between the Byzantine and Islamic maritime powers, with which a complex relationship of competition and collaboration was established for the control of the Mediterranean routes. The Crusades offered these cities, the so-called maritime republics (Amalfi, Genoa, Venice, Pisa, Ancona and Ragusa) the opportunity to expand trade, which was already active, with the Levant: thousands of inhabitants of these cities flocked to the East, creating warehouses, colonies and commercial establishments, supporting the Crusaders both logistically (e.g. the Genoese supplied the troops of Bohemond of Hauteville engaged in the Siege of Antioch) and with the supply of soldiers and military support.

During the 12th century, it was the Republic of Venice (an "excellent" commercial interlocutor of Byzantium since the so-called Chrysobull of 1082) and the Republic of Genoa that emerged as dominant powers among the maritime republics, creating true and proper thalassocracies across the Mediterranean. At the beginning of the 13th century, the Mediterranean political-commercial balance was undermined by the Latin conquest of Constantinople (1204) during the Fourth Crusade which made Venice the undisputed master of trade with the East, which by then had extended, in that period, to the Black Sea, a commercial hub along the Silk Road.

In March 1261, the Byzantine-Nicene emperor Michael VIII Palaiologos allied himself with Genoa to reconquer Constantinople from the Latins and signed the Treaty of Nymphaeum which granted the Genoese important commercial privileges in the Black Sea and the Mediterranean in exchange for their active support against the other Latin powers and, above all, Venice. Constantinople was liberated from the Latins on the following 25 July and Genoa was able to establish itself there, then extending its influence into the Black Sea, where it reached Pontus (northern Anatolia) and the Crimea, while Venice was formally expelled (although the Venetian quarter of the metropolis continued to be used and populated).

This first open clash between Venice and Genoa, which originated well before the Byzantine reconquest of Constantinople and due to the inevitable collision between the two thalassocracies, came to be known as the War of Saint Sabas and was the prelude to a conflict that dragged on with alternating events until the threshold of the 15th century.

== Battlefield ==
The Venetian-Genoese clashes usually took place off the coasts and trading posts that the two maritime republics controlled both along the Italian Peninsula and elsewhere in the Mediterranean and Black Seas.

Venice had built the foundations of its commercial empire thanks to the Chrysobull of 1082, establishing itself in Constantinople, Athens, Thessaloniki, Thebes, Antioch, Ephesus as well as in the islands of Euboea and Chios. In 1204 it considerably extended its area of influence in the Mediterranean following the capture of Zadar, the subsequent annexation of Dalmatia and the sack of Constantinople by the Crusaders. In the arrangement among the crusaders regarding the distribution of conquered territories, the Partitio terrarum imperii Romaniae, the Venetians received (in theory) three-eighths of the Byzantine Empire, including three-eighths of the city of Constantinople itself. Venice subsequently renounced part of its territorial claims, believing that control of the commercial centers and trade routes that crossed the former Byzantine Empire was more essential. In addition to its positions on the mainland, Venice took advantage of the Byzantine weakening to take control of several Greek islands: in the Cyclades, where the Duchy of Naxos was founded (1207); in Crete (1209), where the Duchy of Candia was founded; and in the Ionian Islands (Corfu, Lesbos, Kythira, etc.). The management of these territories was "mixed": in Constantinople, power was centralized in the hands of a podestà who was responsible, theoretically, for everything that happened in Romania; in the Aegean, as anticipated, Venice preferred to enfeoff its nobles and citizens by creating a network of vassalage on the model of what was done by the French Christian potentates with whom it had collaborated in the Fourth Crusade.

Genoa established itself as a maritime power following a series of victories against the Republic of Pisa between 1118 and 1131. In 1191 it took possession of Monaco, over whose currently independent principality the Genoese Grimaldi family still reigns. Following the Treaty of Nymphaeum (1261) with the Byzantines, Genoa gained access to the Black Sea, where it established several trading ports around the Crimea (e.g. Gazaria), whose main port, Caffa, was founded around 1266, a stable settlement in Constantinople in the district of Pera and others in Anatolia: in the cities of Phocaea and Scalanova (current Kuşadası) on the Mediterranean side, Trabzon, Amasra and Sinop on the Black Sea side. In 1284 Genoa took possession of Corsica and part of Sardinia following the victory against Pisa in the Battle of Meloria (in which the Pisan fleet was commanded by a Venetian, former consul of Constantinople Alberto Morosini). Like Venice, Genoa also managed these territories with an approach that favored, in the most important strategic-commercial hub (in this case the Crimea), a management consistent with the democratic regime of the city while in the Aegean there was massive recourse to the enfeoffment of citizens who personally built the overseas dominion of the republic. Compared to the Venetians, however, the Genoese were free, in the 14th century, to create real potentates with great autonomy with respect to their homeland, due to the intrinsic characteristics of the Genoese municipality, which lacked the widespread state presence of Venice.

== Conflicts ==
=== War of Saint Sabas ===
The first large-scale conflict between Genoa and Venice, named the War of Saint Sabas, dates back to a few years before the Byzantine reconquest of Constantinople. It originated from a dispute between merchants in Acre (then the capital of the Kingdom of Jerusalem since the Holy City had been reconquered for the Muslims by Saladin), a key business center for all trade and interests, especially Italian, in Levantine coast. Futile reasons, actually fueled by old grievances that had excluded the Genoese from the division of the Byzantine lands after the Fourth Crusade, led to a Genoese attack on the Venetian district of Acre. The Venetians, together with Pisans and Provencals, the Knights Templar and some of the local nobility, turned against the Catalans, the Anconitans, the Knights Hospitaller, other local nobles and the Genoese. A fleet sent from Venice under Lorenzo Tiepolo in 1257 defeated a Genoese fleet off Acre when it arrived in June of the following year.

In 1261, with the signing of the Treaty of Nymphaeum between Genoa and the Nicaean emperor Michael VIII Palaiologos, the reconquest of Constantinople from the Latins supported by Venice took place, as anticipated. On the maritime side, the Venetian navy maintained its dominance in battle over the Genoese. The major battles that occurred, at Acre in 1258, at Settepozzi in Euboia in 1263, and off Trapani in Sicily in 1266, were crushing Venetian victories. The Genoese instead concentrated on attacks on Venetian commercial convoys with acts of piracy as in the Battle of Saseno.

The disputes between the Genoese and Emperor Michael VIII allowed the Venetians the possibility of having commercial privileges in the Byzantine Empire, with a truce signed in 1268. The war ended in 1270 with the Peace of Cremona, mediated by Louis IX of France and Pope Clement IV who wished to organize the Eighth Crusade and needed the Venetian and Genoese fleets for this undertaking. Following the peace, Venice increased its power in what remained of the Kingdom of Jerusalem but was unable to prevent the relaunch of Genoese trade in the Byzantine world and the establishment of their commercial dominion in the Black Sea which would last until the Ottoman conquest of Constantinople (1453).

=== War of Curzola ===
The continuous rivalry between Venice (which in 1277 had managed to re-enter the Byzantine political orbit by settling in Thessaloniki) and Genoa led to clashes in 1291 and the resumption of war in 1295.

In 1294, at the Battle of Laiazzo, a Venetian fleet was destroyed by a naval fleet from Genoa's eastern colonies off the important port of Laiazzo, in the Armenian Kingdom of Cilicia. Subsequently, the Venetians rebuilt a fleet that sacked the Genoese ports of Phocaea in the Aegean, Caffa in the Crimea, and Pera (then unwalled) in Constantinople. In retaliation for the sack of Pera, the Genoese of Constantinople attacked the local Marciano neighborhood, massacring its inhabitants. Despite the Byzantine-Venetian truce of 1285, the Byzantine emperor Andronikos II Palaiologos immediately sided with the Genoese, arresting the Venetian survivors of the massacre, including bailo Marco Bembo. In July, the Venetian fleet, under the command of Ruggiero Morosini Malabranca, stormed the Bosphorus. During the expedition, various Genoese possessions in the Mediterranean and Black Sea were captured and plundered, including again Phocaea and Pera. The basileus, however, preferred at that point to avoid siding with Genoa again to avoid a war with Venice.

In 1298, the Genoese fleet under the command of Lamba Doria entered the Adriatic and engaged the Venetians in the bloody Battle of Curzola, the largest and most challenging maritime clash between the two republics to date. The Venetian fleet, under Andrea Dandolo, was destroyed. The Genoese had also suffered serious losses and decided to return home rather than advance towards Venice. It was during this battle, according to some in Curzola and according to others in Laiazzo, that the famous Venetian Marco Polo was taken prisoner and while in prison he wrote his memoirs.

In 1299 with the Treaty of Milan the two Republics signed peace. The Venetians instead continued the war with the Byzantines.

=== Interlude: Fights against the Turks and Mongols ===
At the beginning of the 14th century, relations between Genoa and Venice were still in a state of tension (in 1304 the Genoese occupied Chios with the approval of Byzantium) but the political upheavals in Crimea managed to make the two thalassocracies unlikely allies.

On the Black Sea, relations between the Mongols and Italian merchants were somewhat ambiguous: the Mongol knights, averse to the sea, benefited from the Italian trade that connected Asia and Europe through the Crimea but the enrichment of the European trading posts fueled their greed. From 1307 tensions emerged on the issue of the trade in Turkish slaves, sold by the Italians to the Mamluk Sultanate of Egypt to make them soldiers. Dissatisfied with this trade fueled by steppe kidnappings to provide an army to his enemy the Mamluks, Khan Toqta of the Golden Horde arrested the Genoese residents of Sarai Berke and besieged Caffa. Poorly protected by an earth and wood fence, the city fell in May 1308 and was abandoned by the Genoese who set it on fire. When Toqta died in 1312, Genoa sent ambassadors to his successor, Özbeg Khan, who agreed to welcome the Genoese back and in 1316 adopted measures to encourage the reconstruction of Caffa.

In 1327, Venice began to push for the formation of an anti-Turkish league including Byzantium, the Knights Hospitallers and the lord of Chios, to put a brake on the growing power of the Turkish Beilicates of Anatolia (in 1320, Smyrna, already Genoese, had been conquered by the Turkish emir of Aydin). The league faced and defeated the Turkish fleets in the Battle of Adramyttium (1334) and then supported the Anatolian expeditions of Hugh IV of Cyprus (1336-1337). The subsequent Christian expeditions, known as the Smyrna Crusades (1343-1351), managed to bring some order to Anatolia, giving the Venetians respite from the Turkish threat.

In the meantime, after the death of Özbeg Khan in 1341, his son Jani Beg reignited tensions between the Mongols, recently converted to Islam, and the Italians in Crimea. In 1343, a Mongol merchant was killed during an altercation with a Venetian nobleman in the city of Tana, and in retaliation, the Horde attacked the Venetian exercises in Tana, giving Jani Beg the pretext to assume control of all Italian trading posts, while the Genoese took advantage of the Venetian withdrawal from Tana to establish a commercial monopoly in the Black Sea.

In 1346 Jani Beg attacked Caffa. After two years of siege, the Mongols were forced to retreat after being decimated by the plague, which also infected the Genoese after Jani Beg decided to throw plague-ridden corpses over the city walls. Following this act of bacteriological warfare, the epidemic rapidly spread to Caffa, most likely from rats making their way into the city rather than because of the flung corpses, and forced the Genoese to abandon the city after the siege was lifted by the Mongols. The dispersal of Italian merchants in the Mediterranean, with their ships carrying flea-infested rats, was the cause of the second plague pandemic in Europe, the "Black Death".

=== War of the Straits ===
Disputes over Black Sea prompted the outbreak of another war in 1350, in which Venice allied with King Peter IV of Aragon, who was at odds with Genoa over control of Sardinia and the commercial rivalry between his Catalan subjects and the Genoese, and entered the war in 1351.

Following clashes between local forces in the Aegean and around the Bosphorus, in 1351 a major Genoese fleet under Paganino Doria besieged the Venetian colony of Negroponte before advancing to Constantinople. The Byzantine Emperor John VI, who had lost a short war with the Genoese in 1348–1349, had been induced to enter the war on the Venetian side and assisted them in attacks on Pera. A combined Venetian-Catalan fleet under Niccolo Pisani and the Catalan Ponce de Santapau arrived soon afterwards and joined forces with the Byzantines, and the bloody battle of the Straits was fought in the Bosphorus in February 1352. Both sides suffered heavy casualties, but the most serious losses were inflicted on the Catalans, inducing Pisani to withdraw and enabling Doria to force Byzantium out of the war.

In August 1353, Pisani led the Venetians and Catalans to a crushing victory over the Genoese under Antonio Grimaldi off Alghero in Sardinia. Alarmed by the defeat, Genoa submitted to Giovanni Visconti, Lord of Milan, in order to secure his financial support. In 1354 Paganino Doria caught Pisani unprepared in his anchorage at Zonklon (Sapienza) in the Peloponnese and captured the entire Venetian fleet. This defeat contributed to the deposition of doge Marino Faliero, and Venice made peace with Genoa on 1 June 1355. Though inconclusive in itself, Venice's exhaustion by this war helped bring about the loss of Dalmatia to Hungary shortly afterwards. Freed of the need for support from Milan, the Genoese brought an end to Milanese rule in 1356.

=== War of Chioggia ===
In 1376 Venice bought the strategically positioned island of Tenedos near the Dardanelles from the Byzantine Emperor John V, threatening Genoese access to the Black Sea. This induced the Genoese to help John's son Andronikos IV to seize the throne, in return for the transfer of the island to Genoa, initiating a new war between the two republics. The Genoese failed to take Tenedos from the Venetians in 1377, but gained the support of a coalition of Venice's mainland rivals Hungary, Austria, Aquileia and Padua, although only Padua gave substantial assistance. Venice allied with Milan, whose army threatened Genoa from the landward side, and with the Kingdom of Cyprus, which had been defeated in a war with Genoa in 1373-74 and subjected to Genoese hegemony.

A small Genoese fleet led by Luciano Doria invaded the Adriatic in 1378 and defeated the Venetians under Vettor Pisani at Pula in 1379. Having been reinforced, they advanced against Venice under Pietro Doria, Luciano having been killed at Pula. Though failing to break through the defences of the Venetian lagoon, the Genoese captured the port of Chioggia near its southern end, with support from the Paduans on land.

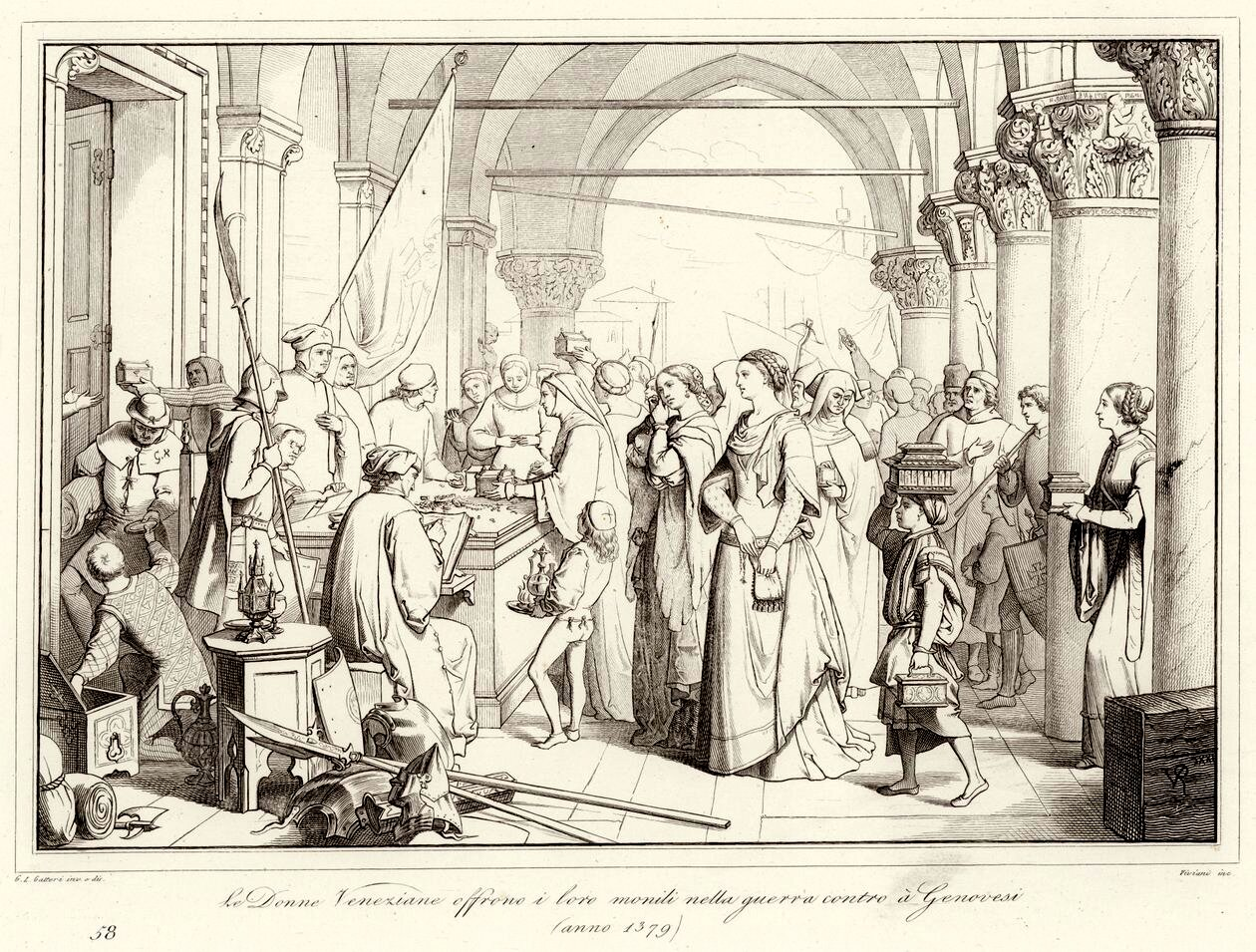
Venetian noblewomen offering their jewelry in the fight against Genoa, 1379

In December 1379 the Venetians were able to sink blockships in the harbour of Chioggia, trapping the Genoese fleet inside. Venice was reinforced by the return of a raiding fleet under Carlo Zeno, which had enjoyed exceptional success against Genoese commerce throughout the Mediterranean. A new Genoese fleet was assembled in the Adriatic, but was unable to break through to relieve Chioggia. The forces trapped inside were forced to surrender in June 1380.

Fighting continued between the Genoese and Venetian fleets over the ports of the upper Adriatic, but through the mediation of Amadeus VI of Savoy, the two sides negotiated peace at Turin in 1381. Despite the victory at Chioggia, the war had been financially disastrous for Venice, which only secured peace by agreeing to concessions including the evacuation of Tenedos, recognition of Genoese supremacy in Cyprus, the surrender of its principal mainland possession of Treviso, and the payment of an annual tribute to Hungary, whereas Genoa and its allies made no significant concessions.

== Disengagement ==
The War of Chioggia left the rivalry between Venice and Genoa unresolved, as had all previous conflicts between them. Venice was left severely debilitated, but was gradually able to rebuild its public finances and to take advantage of the weaknesses of its mainland rivals to redress its losses. Genoa had less success in dealing with the debts accumulated during these wars, and fell into deepening financial incapacity over the following decades. Its chronic political instability became acute after 1390, contributing to the acceptance of French sovereignty in 1396, the first of a series of prolonged bouts of foreign rule during the fifteenth century, which reduced its freedom of action.

These contrasting developments diminished Genoa's capacity to compete with Venice politically, although its commercial fortunes continued to flourish until the middle of the fifteenth century. After 1400, the expansion of Aragonese power in the western Mediterranean posed an increasing threat to Genoa, which led to a series of full-scale wars (1420–26, 1435–44, 1454–58) and remained a major preoccupation until the death of Alfonso V of Aragon in 1458, taking priority over the old rivalry with Venice.

Sporadic piratical violence between Venetians and Genoese continued, notably in the wake of a naval clash at Modon in 1403. During a period of Milanese rule in Genoa, conflict on the Italian mainland between Milan and Venice drew Genoa into another inconclusive naval war with Venice in 1431-33. Nonetheless, the rivalry had ceased to be a dominant consideration in either city's affairs.
