= Hours of Philip the Good =

Collection highlight from the National Library of the Netherlands

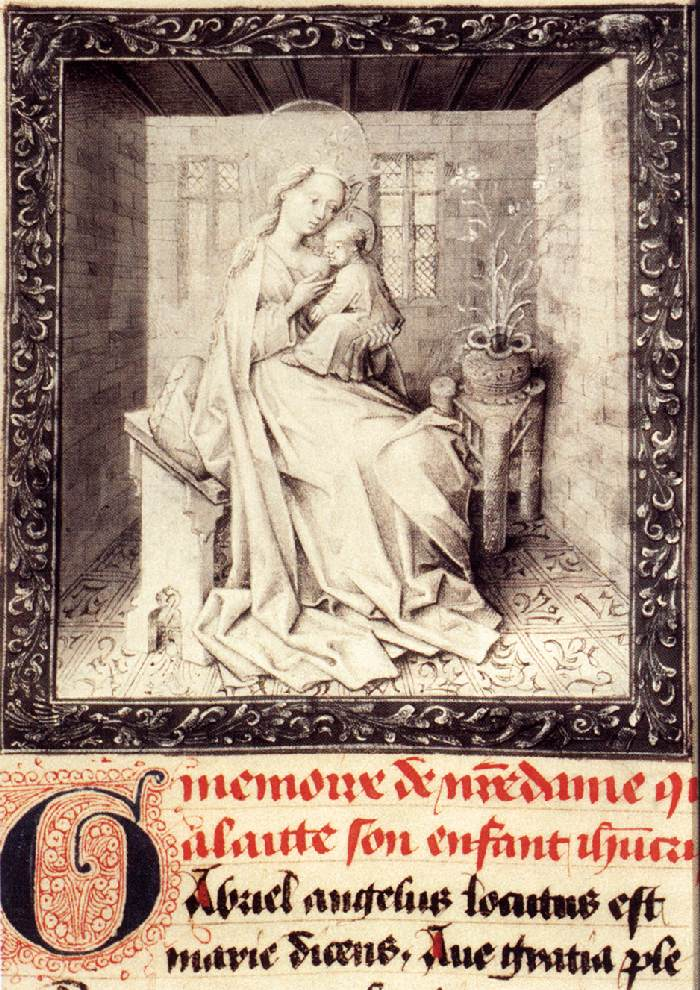
Folio 245, Virgin and Child. National Library of the Netherlands

The Hours of Philip the Good refers to one of at least two illuminated books of hours produced for Philip the Good. The first of these (c. 1416) is in the Bibliothèque Nationale, Paris, and the second (1454–55) in the National Library of the Netherlands, The Hague.

The book in Paris includes miniatures attributed to the Boucicaut Master.

The book in the Netherlands was probably written by Jean Miélot, secretary to the duke, and illuminated by Jean Le Tavernier. It consists of 341 pages, each 27 cm x 19 cm, and contains 165 miniatures, each painted in grisaille.

== Sources ==
Lieftinck, G. I. "Grisailles in the Book of Hours of Philip the Good in The Hague and the Master of Mary of Burgundy". Oud Holland, Volume 85, No. 4, 1970
