= Hours of Jean de Boucicaut =

Illuminated manuscript in Musée Jacquemart-André

Flight from Egypt
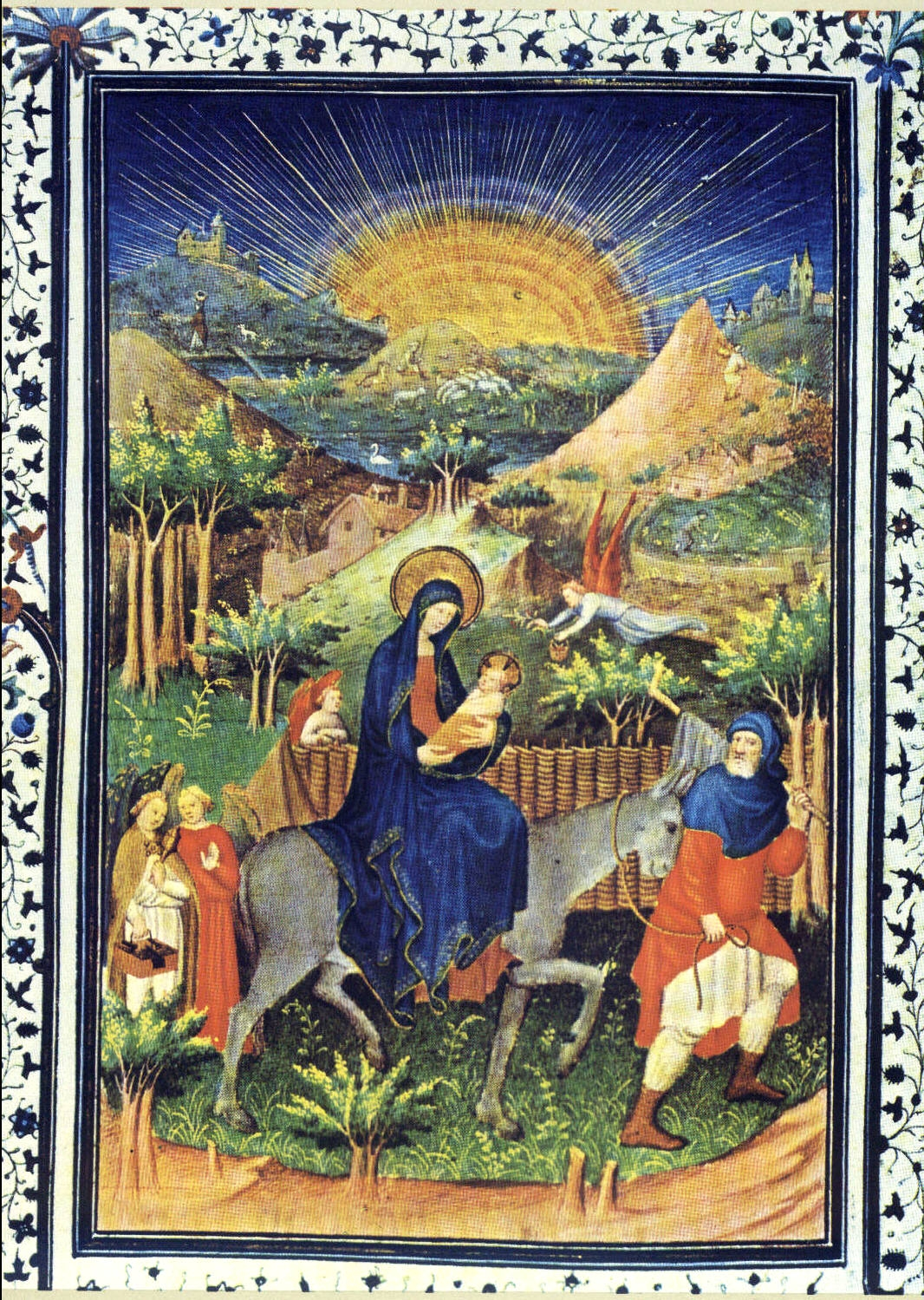
- Ascribed to: The Boucicaut Master
- Patron: Jean de Boucicaut
- Date: 1405-1408

The Hours of Jean de Boucicaut is believed to have been created between 1405 and 1408. It contains the Paris Liturgy of the Hours. While characterized by typical Parisian styles of illumination, some illustrations in the manuscript are quite innovative. This manuscript contains 44 miniatures by the Boucicaut Master, possibly within the assistance of students, and is now in the Musée Jacquemart-André, Paris, ms. 2. The Boucicaut Master experimented with perfecting aerial perspective and with his works established the precedent of historically portraying biblical scenes. Jean de Boucicaut, who was a Marshal of France, commissioned the book as a tool of daily devotion. The illuminated pages correspond to events in Marshal Jean de Boucicaut's life as well as incorporating biblical figures with whom he identifies.

== Patron ==
Jean de Boucicaut, born 1366, was a Marshal of France. He was named Marshal in 1391 by King Charles VI and married Antoinette de Turenne in 1393. While on a crusade against the Turks, led by the Duke of Nevers, Boucicaut was captured. The Duke of Nevers negotiated Boucicaut's release with Bayazid, the leader of the Turkish army. After his release he was made Governor of Genoa by the people of the region and served for seven years. After his unceremonious deposition as Governor of Genoa, he fled to Piedmont. As Governor of Guyenne and Languedoc he was taken prisoner again by the English after the loss of the battle of Agincourt in 1415.

== Artist ==
David Before God
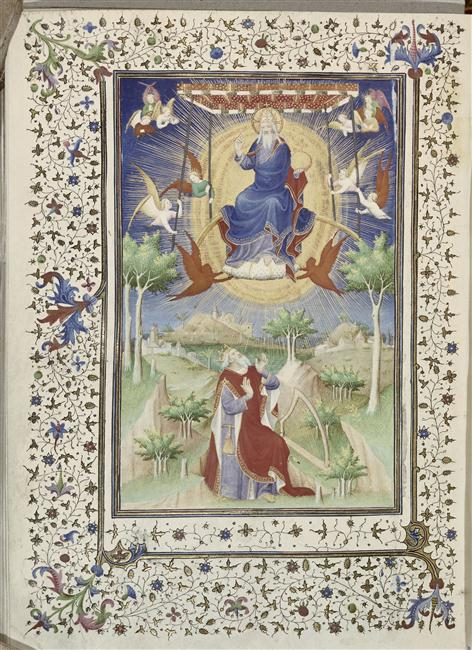
- Ascribed to: The Boucicaut Master
- Patron: Jean de Boucicaut
- Date: 1405-1405

The Boucicaut master is named for the patron of the Book of Hours of Jean de Boucicaut. His true identity is unknown, but art historians have established that he headed a workshop of artists who painted in his style. Like many artists he drew inspiration and took examples from other masters to develop his own unique individual form of artistry.

The Boucicaut master most likely discovered aerial perspective as witnessed by his mastery of it in this book of hours. Master Boucicaut was interested in bright colors and their roles in creating expression and meaning in static forms. In other words, he used bright colors to imply a certain mood. The artist concentrates on creating grouped forms that seem to have their own independent importance. He paints the forms in a way that seems like the individual could be displaced from the group and still have context. Through his composition Master Boucicaut introduces the concept of depicting biblical scenes as earthly events. In the scenes Flight into Egypt and Pentecost, a shepherd off in the distance with his flock places the foreground scene in the context of the real world. This implies the foreground event is in "reality" rather than a purely celestial moment.

Master Boucicaut used bright colors also to illustrate depth, and perceived imagery rather than the expected as seen in the David Before God illumination. With perceived imagery Master Boucicaut pioneered a new way of depicting forms that looked "realistic" instead of idealistic. He used lined templates as a structure to create perspectives in his illustrations. He also used the entire page to layer planes of perceived depth. An example of this is the Martyrdom of St Thomas of Canterbury. He includes an entry way with columns and an arch close to the edges of the illustrated frame. This further separates the scene from the rest of the page. This effect added to the blank space between the gold linear frame and the thicker pseudo-acanthus leaf border, emphasizes the disconnect between the seemingly three dimensional scene and the two dimensional page.

Master Boucicaut and his guild included scenes requested by the patron (Marshal Boucicaut). The martyrdom of St. Thomas was added to the book to illustrate the Marshal's distaste for the English. The saints Master Boucicaut chose to include were chosen because the Marshal felt a connection to them. Saints like Saint Leonard who was the patron saint of prisoners appealed to the Marshal, having been a prisoner twice before. St. Michael appealed to the Marshal because he crusaded against evil to preserve the Christian faith as Michael smote the demon. St. Catherine was the patron saint of a town for which the Marshal constructed a hospital.

== Illuminations ==
The artist uses visual banding in the composition of the illuminated works. Horizontal lines that corresponded to the analogous text were drawn on the illumination page and these lines influenced the composition of the illustration. One example is The Virgin and Child Enthroned on folio 46v: registers A-D would match the description on the text page. The patron of this book of hours requested certain illustrations to be included, such as an illumination of his wedding to Antoinette de Turenne.

The Wedding
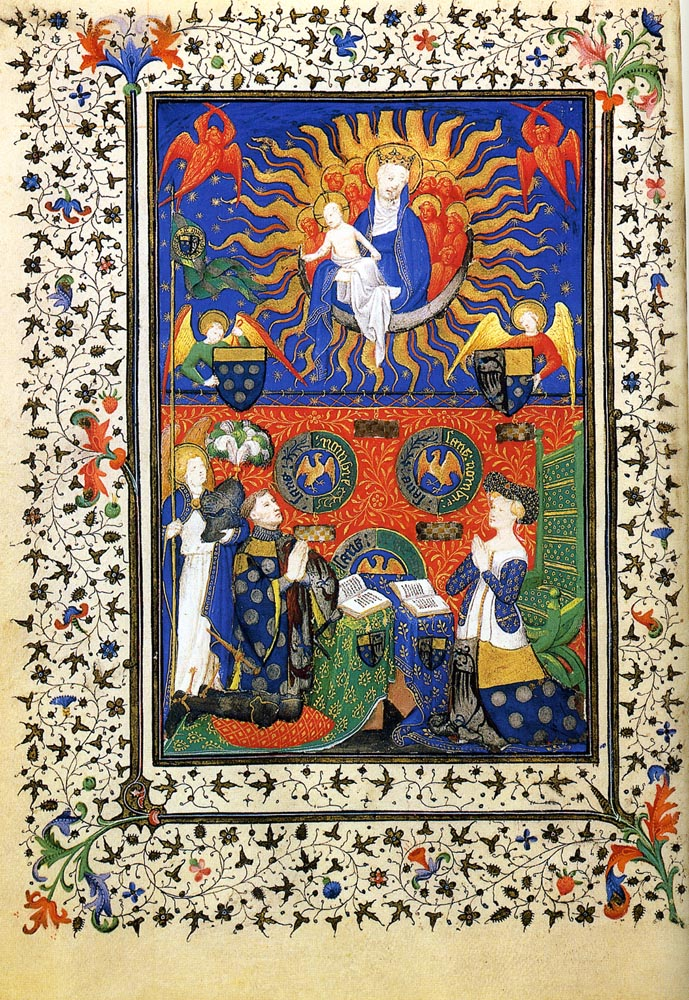
- Ascribed to: The Boucicaut Master
- Patron: Jean de Boucicaut
- Date: 1405-1408

He also had his emblem of an eagle spreading his wings added to many of the folios. This was unusual because people of Jean de Boucicaut's station do not display their emblems so often, especially in a book of hours which is supposed to be contemplative instead of boastful. Jean de Boucicaut's motto was “ce que vous voudrez” which translates to English as “whatever you want”. Marshal Boucicaut had this motto put on many of the illuminations, however the most recent owner of the book of hours after Boucicaut (Aymar de Poitiers) had this motto blacked out along with Boucicaut's emblem. In the Adoration of the Magi

the youngest magus is wearing black and a gold collar unique to that figure in that scene. This was unusual to the scene because the Adoration scene should have been a happy one but the youngest magus was dressed in mourning clothes. Marshal Boucicaut wanted the form of the youngest magus to represent his friend Louis de Orleans who was assassinated in 1407. The placement of the somber representation of the assassinated Louis de Orleans gives an indication of when the Boucicaut Hours was finished.

The borders of the illuminations seem to all be created at the same time as evidenced by the similarity in the scroll-work. Although the Boucicaut master altered the design of the boarder slightly with every illumination, there is no great deviation in style. The pseudo-arcanthus leaf work of the boarders are all similar. The space between the two gold outlines of the scene vary in width but the effect of distancing the scene and the page is still achieved.
