= Battle of Modon =

Battle of Modon can refer to one of the following engagements that took place at Methoni, Messenia (medieval Modon):

- Battle of Modon (1403), between the Venetians and the Genoese
- Battle of Modon (1500), between the Venetians and the Ottomans
- Siege of Modon (1686), between the Venetians and the Ottomans
