= Boucicaut's expedition to the Levant (1403) =

- Part of the Crusades
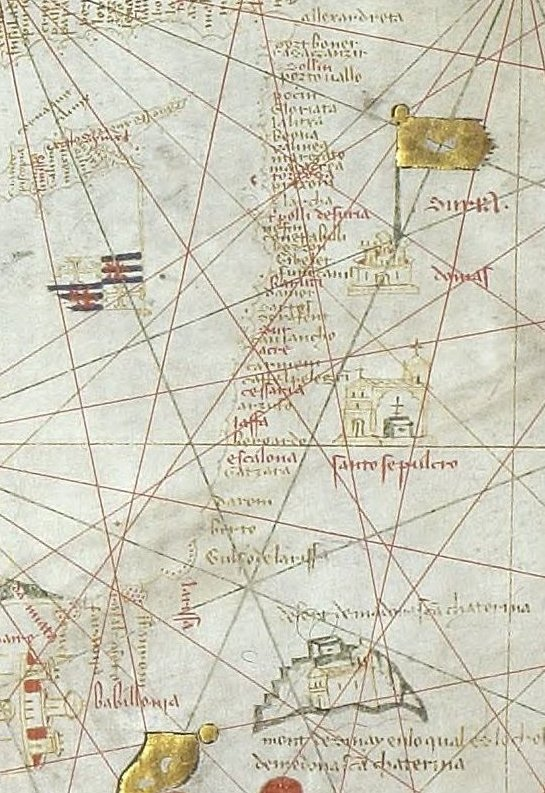
- Map of Levant in 14th century
Date	August 1403
Location	Levant
Result	Mamluk victory

Belligerents
Kingdom of France; Republic of Genoa (Sovereign Military Order of Malta) Knights Hospitaller	Mamluk Sultanate

Commanders and leaders
Marshal Boucicaut; Philibert de Naillac	Al-Mu'ayyad Shaykh

Strength
Unknown	Unknown

Casualties and losses
Heavy	Heavy

In 1403, the French commander Marshal Boucicaut launched a military expedition against the Mamluk Sultanate. The Crusaders aimed to attack the Levantine coast. During the campaign, several attacks were launched on coastal cities, including Beirut, which sacked Venetian spices. The expedition failed to achieve anything besides the resumption of hositilies between Venice and Genoa.

== Background ==
In 1396, Genoa proposed an alliance to French King Charles VI because it was weakened by the recent war with Venice and the peace treaty of Turin. Genoa eventually chose outright French rule, and French general Boucicaut was appointed governor in 1401. Boucicaut was known for his successful campaign to save Constantinople from the Ottomans. In 1373, Genoa captured Famagusta, a crucial trading port, but the kings of Cyprus refused to accept the loss. King Janus ascended to the throne and began military campaigns to regain Famagusta. Boucicaut dispatched reinforcements and successfully relieved the city.

After this, Boucicaut had already made plans for an expedition against the Mamluks. The Byzantine emperor Manuel II Palaiologos, who had passed Genoa in January 1403 on his way back to Constantinople. Boucicaut aimed to pursue old crusader dreams as he expected the Mamluks to have been severely weakened by the devastating campaigns of Timur. The Genoese-French fleet's massive fleet alerted the Venetians, who believed they intended to attack their colonies in the Eastern Mediterranean. Boucicaut attempted to reach Alexandria by sea but faced strong winds, so he moved towards the Levantine coast. Meanwhile, the Venetians were alerting the coastal towns of an upcoming attack. The French-Genoese fleet was joined by the Knights of Rhodes.

== Expedition ==
=== Battle of Tripoli ===
Afterwards, the Crusaders sailed towards Tripoli, Lebanon. On August 1, the Crusaders disembarked and started a battle with the Mamluks. The port and the shores were covered by the Mamluks; the Crusaders attempted to capture Tripoli but were repelled after a costly attempt. During the fight, the Hospitallers, led by Philibert de Naillac, distinguished themselves. Three days later, the Crusaders sailed to Batroun.

=== Sack of Batroun ===
Boucicaut's next target was the coastal town of Batroun in the south of Tripoli. Batroun was a small town with no walls. Aiming to restore lost confidence after the loss at Tripoli, the Crusaders looted, burned, and massacred the Muslim inhabitants.

=== Sack of Beirut ===
On August 8, the Crusaders sailed to Beirut. The city was vulnerable as the harbors were not fortified at the time of the attack. The Venetians did not want to ruin their relations with the Mamluks, so they warned them. The inhabitants of the city evacuated as soon as they saw the Crusader approach. Only the Mamluk garrison and the Lebanese feudal lords remained to fight. The Crusaders landed to the west of the city and began sacking the city. They torched the houses and the markets. Among the things sacked were the Venetians properties, including spices worth 10,000 dinars.

The Muslims finally rallied and pushed the Crusaders out of the city. According to Muslim sources, a number of Crusaders were killed, and three Muslims died. The Crusaders retreated to their ships in the afternoon. The Muslims decapitated the heads of dead Crusaders and dispatched them to Damascus. Boucicaut was upset with the Venetians betraying the Christian cause, which may have allowed for the sack of their spice.

=== Battle of Sidon ===
After the sack of Beirut, Boucicaut sailed to Sidon. The Mamluk governor of Damascus, Al-Mu'ayyad Shaykh, traveled to Sidon to meet the Crusaders. A fierce battle ensued in which the governor's horse was wounded. In the end, the Crusaders were forced to retreat and took shelter in an old fortress by the harbor in Sidon. The Mamluks expected another Crusader attack the next day, so they began making defensive preparations. However, the Crusaders had retreated to their ships and sailed towards Beirut to replenish their water supplies. An attempt to chase them failed.

== Aftermath ==
Boucicaut sailed to Latakia but discovered a large number of Muslims ready to repel them, so he abandoned the campaign and sailed to Famagusta. The Boucicaut expedition to the Levant failed to reconquer any city in the holy land. It's unknown if he intended to recapture Palestine, but it may suggest his true goal was to construct a Christian fortress along the coast of Syria and Palestine, which the Genoese from Famagusta could have provided and utilized as a starting point for additional operations in Syria.

The campaign resulted in enmity between the Venetians and Genoa. Venice saw this as a violation of the treaty of 1381. The Venetians clashed with Boucicaut in a battle near Modon, which ended in a Venetian victory.

== Sources ==
- Albrecht Fuess (2005), Prelude to a Stronger Involvement in the Middle East: French Attacks on Beirut in the Years 1403 and 1520.
- Eliyahu Ashtor (2014), Levant Trade in the Middle Ages.
- Kenneth Meyer Setton (1976), The Papacy and the Levant, 1204-1571: The thirteenth and fourteenth centuries, Vol I.
- Luttrell, Anthony (1975). "The Hospitallers at Rhodes, 1306–1421". In Setton, Kenneth M.; Hazard, Harry W. (eds.). A History of the Crusades, Volume III: The Fourteenth and Fifteenth Centuries. Vol. 3. Madison and London: University of Wisconsin Press. pp. 278–313. ISBN 0-299-06670-3.
