= Jean II Le Maingre =

French knight, marshal and crusader (1366–1421)

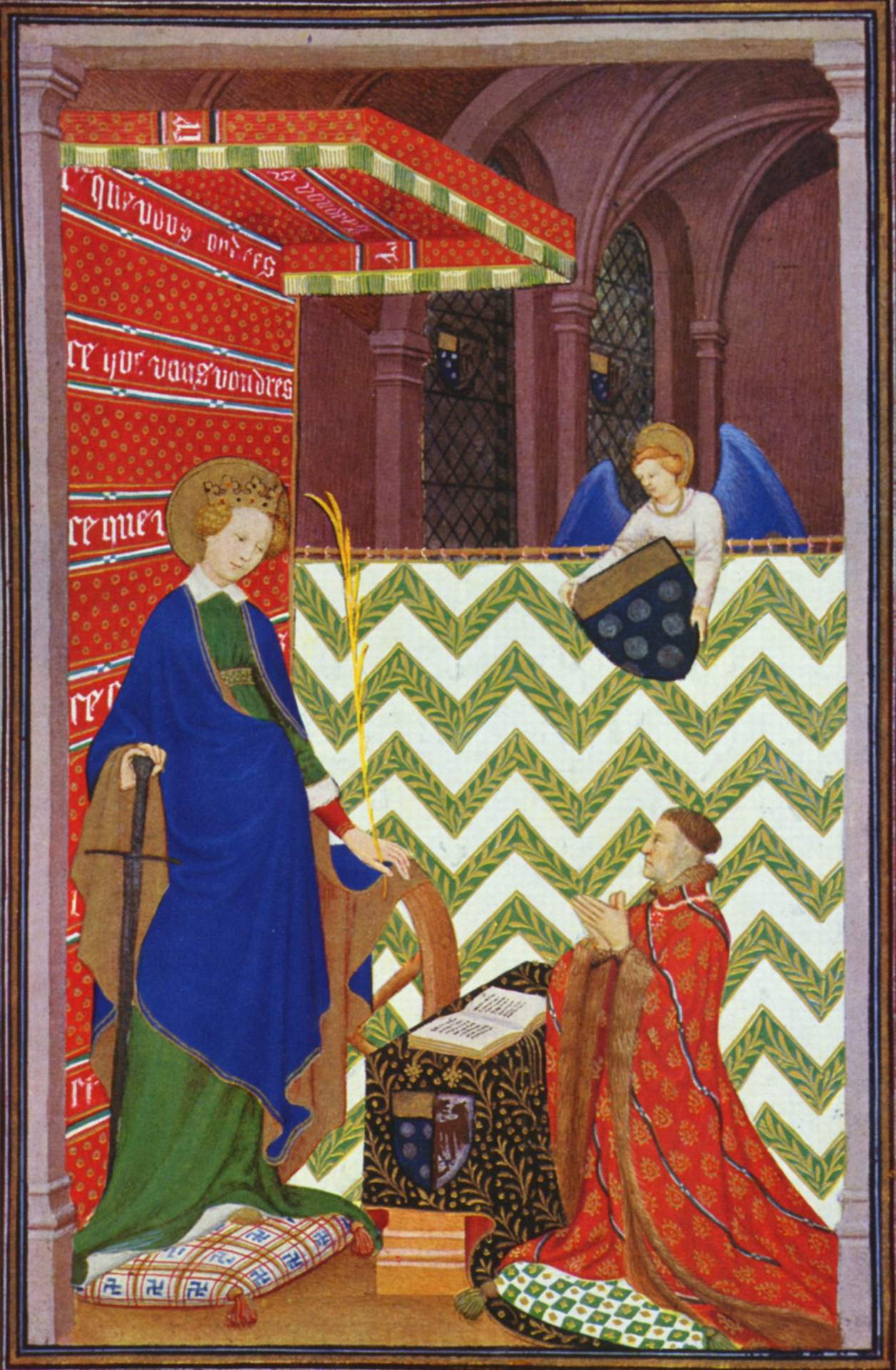
- Boucicaut praying to Saint Catherine from the Hours of Jean de Boucicaut
- Born: 28 August 1366; Tours, France
- Died: 21 June 1421 (aged 54) Yorkshire, England

Jean II Le Maingre (Old French: Jehan le Meingre), also known as Boucicaut (28 August 1366 – 21 June 1421), was a French knight and military leader. Renowned for his military skill and embodiment of chivalry, he was made a Marshal of France.

== Biography ==
He was the son of Jean I Le Maingre, also called Boucicaut and likewise a Marshal of France. He became a page at the court of King Charles V of France, and at the age of 12 he accompanied Louis II, Duke of Bourbon, in a campaign against Normandy. At age 16 he was knighted by Louis on the eve of the Battle of Roosebeke (27 November 1382). In 1383, he began the first of his journeys that would take up more than twenty years of his life.

In 1384, he undertook his first journey to Prussia in order to assist the Teutonic Order in its war against the pagan Lithuanians, who would convert to Roman Catholicism in 1386. After some campaigns against the Moors in Spain, and against Toulouse in France he again accompanied the Duke of Bourbon, this time to Spain, which had become a secondary battlefield of the Hundred Years' War. From there he travelled for two years through the Balkans, the Near East, and the Holy Land, in the company of his friend Renaud of Roye and later with Philip of Artois, Count of Eu. There, he and his companions composed the Livre des Cent Ballades, a poetical defense of the chaste knight, the central figure of chivalry, which Johan Huizinga found a startling contrast with the facts of his military career.

Arms of Jean II Le Meingre,d'argent à l'aigle éployée de gueules becquée et membrée d'azur, Argent, an eagle displayed Gules armed and beaked Azure

In 1390, while the Truce of Leulinghem had temporarily interrupted the war with England, Boucicaut and two other French knights set up the tournament of Saint-Inglevert, where he jousted, along with his two comrades, against redoubtable English knights, unhorsing three of his 18 opponents. The next year he travelled to Prussia for a third time. Because of his great service in the war against the heathens in Livonia and Prussia, he was named Marshal of France on 25 December 1391 by King Charles VI at the Cathedral of St. Martin in Tours.

In 1393, Boucicaut married Antoinette of Turenne, the only daughter and heir of Viscount Raymond VIII of Turenne, a powerful Provençal noble and papal captain.

In 1396, he took part in the joint French-Hungarian crusade against the Ottoman Empire, which suffered a heavy defeat on September 28 at the Battle of Nicopolis. He was taken hostage by the Ottoman Sultan Bayezid I, but, unlike many of his companions, escaped execution and was eventually ransomed. According to one source, he was only saved because his companion, commander John the Fearless, Count of Nevers, son of Duke Philip the Bold and future Duke of Burgundy, "begged the sultan to spare his good friend." In 1399, he founded the Emprise de l'Escu vert à la Dame Blanche, a chivalric order inspired by the ideal of courtly love: "one might have supposed him cured of all chivalrous delusions after the catastrophe of Nicopolis", remarked Huizinga. In the same year, he was sent with six ships carrying 1,200 men to assist Byzantine emperor Manuel II Palaiologos against the Ottomans, who were besieging Constantinople.

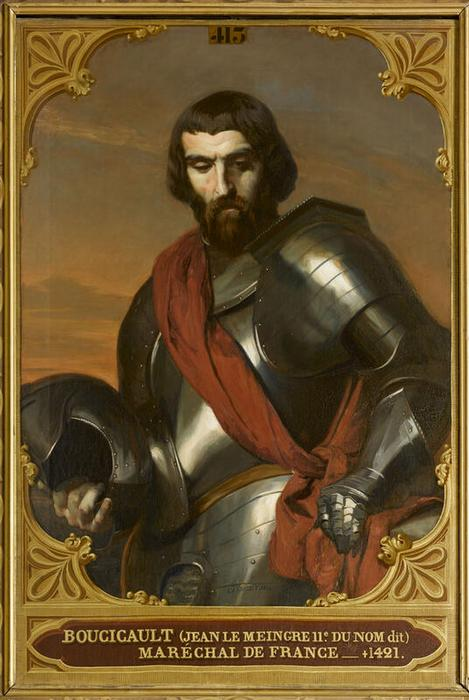
Jean II Le Meingre, also named Boucicaut. Portrait commissioned by King of the French Louis Philippe I for the Historical Museum of Versailles in 1843.

In 1401, because of his military accomplishments and his knowledge of the east, he was appointed French governor of Genoa, which had fallen to Charles VI in 1396. He successfully repelled an attack from King Janus of Cyprus, who tried to take back the city of Famagusta on Cyprus, which had been captured by Genoa. Later on, Boucicaut wanted to attack Alexandria but he was prevented by adverse winds to land there, he later went to Tripoli, then after a costly attempt to capture it, he went south to Botron which was burned and pillaged, then to Beirut on 10 August 1403, which was also sacked and 500 bundles of spices worth 30,000 ducats were taken from the Venetian warehouses there, he later went to attack Sidon then Latakia, which both showed resistance due to strong garrison, he returned to Famagusta in late August, eventually to settle in Rhodes in September, where he dispatched 500 men with two large ships who tried in vain to take Alexandria.

On his return, he was defeated by the Venetians at the Battle of Modon on 7 October 1403. After some struggles in the Mediterranean, the Genoese freed themselves from French rule by 1409.

Boucicaut returned to France and became involved in the rivalry between Burgundy and Orléans. In the Battle of Agincourt in 1415 he commanded the French vanguard with Constable Charles I d'Albret, but was captured by the English and died six years later in Yorkshire. He was buried in the Collégiale Saint-Martin, at the location of what is now the Basilica of St. Martin, Tours, in his family's chapel, with the epitaph "Grand Constable of the Emperor and of the Empire of Constantinople."
