= Leulinghem =

Leulinghem Loningem
- Commune
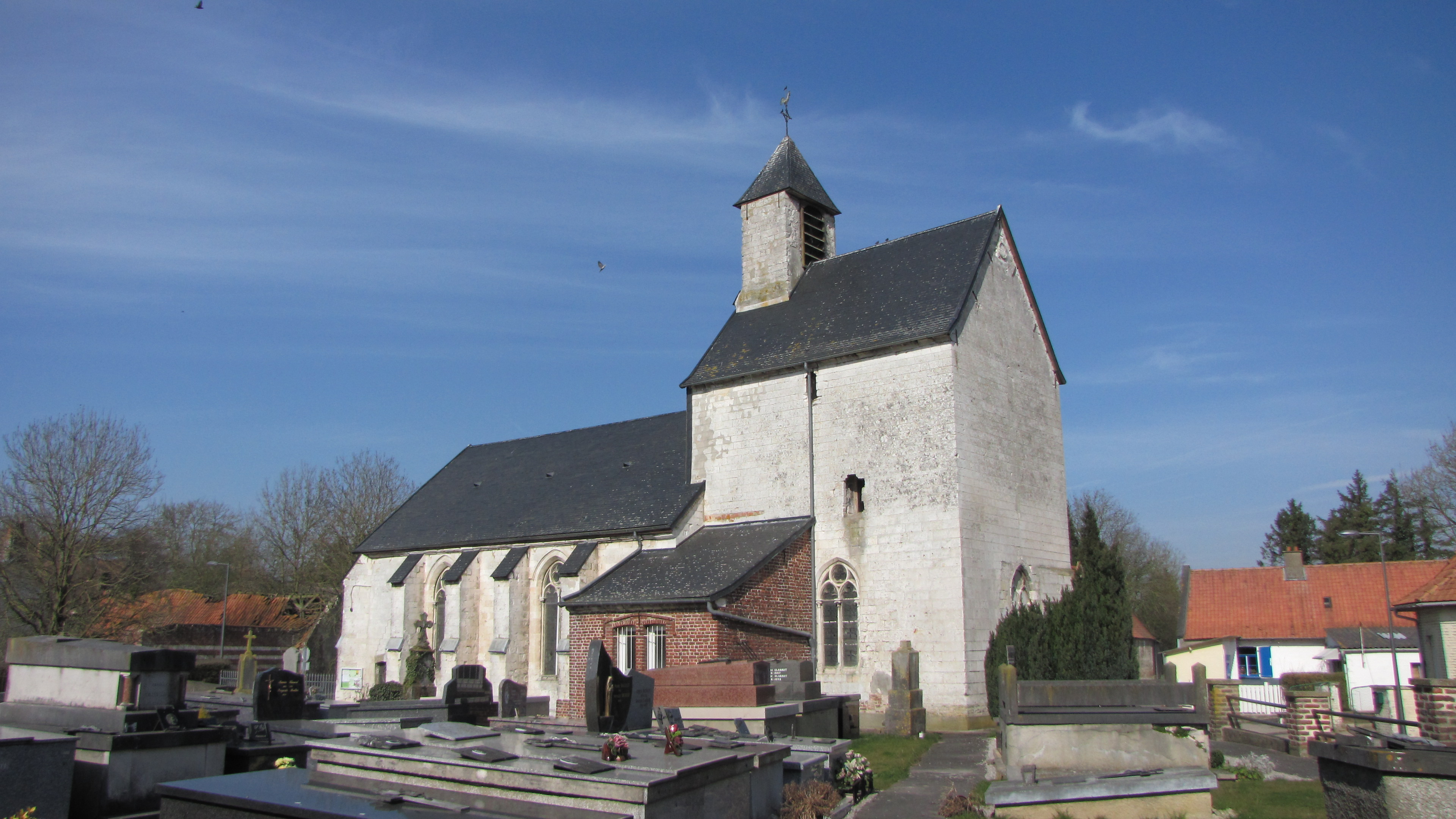
- The church of Leulinghem

- Coat of arms
- Location of Leulinghem
- Location within France Location within Hauts-de-France
- Coordinates: 50°44′09″N 2°09′54″E
- Country: France
- Region: Hauts-de-France
- Department: Pas-de-Calais
- Arrondissement: Saint-Omer
- Canton: Lumbres
- Intercommunality: Pays de Lumbres

Government
  - Mayor (2020–2026): Alain Clabaut
- Area^{1}: 4.72 km^{2} (1.82 sq mi)
- Elevation: 93 m (305 ft)
- Highest elevation: 127 m (417 ft)
- Lowest elevation: 60 m (200 ft)
- Population (2023): 269
  - Density: 57.0/km^{2} (148/sq mi)
- Time zone: UTC+01:00 (CET)
  - Summer (DST): UTC+02:00 (CEST)
- INSEE/Postal code: 62504 /62500
- ^{1} French Land Register data, which excludes lakes, ponds, glaciers > 1 km^{2} (0.386 sq mi or 247 acres) and river estuaries.

Leulinghem (French pronunciation: [lœlɛ̃ɡɑ̃]; West Flemish: Loningem) is a commune in the Pas-de-Calais department in the Hauts-de-France region of France.

The Truce of Leulinghem was signed in Leulinghem in June 1389.

== Geography ==
A small village situated 5 miles (8 km) southwest of Saint-Omer, on the D212 road and 23 miles (38 km) southwest of Calais, half a mile from the A26 autoroute.

== Population ==
Historical population
Year	Pop.	±% p.a.
1968	149	—
1975	114	−3.75%
1982	164	+5.33%
1990	211	+3.20%
1999	219	+0.41%
2007	219	+0.00%
2012	233	+1.25%
2017	252	+1.58%
2023	269	+1.09%
Source: INSEE

== Places of interest ==
- The church of St. Maurice, dating from the twelfth century.

== See also ==
- Communes of the Pas-de-Calais department
- Truce of Leulinghem
