= View of Genoa =

Painting by Cristoforo Grassi

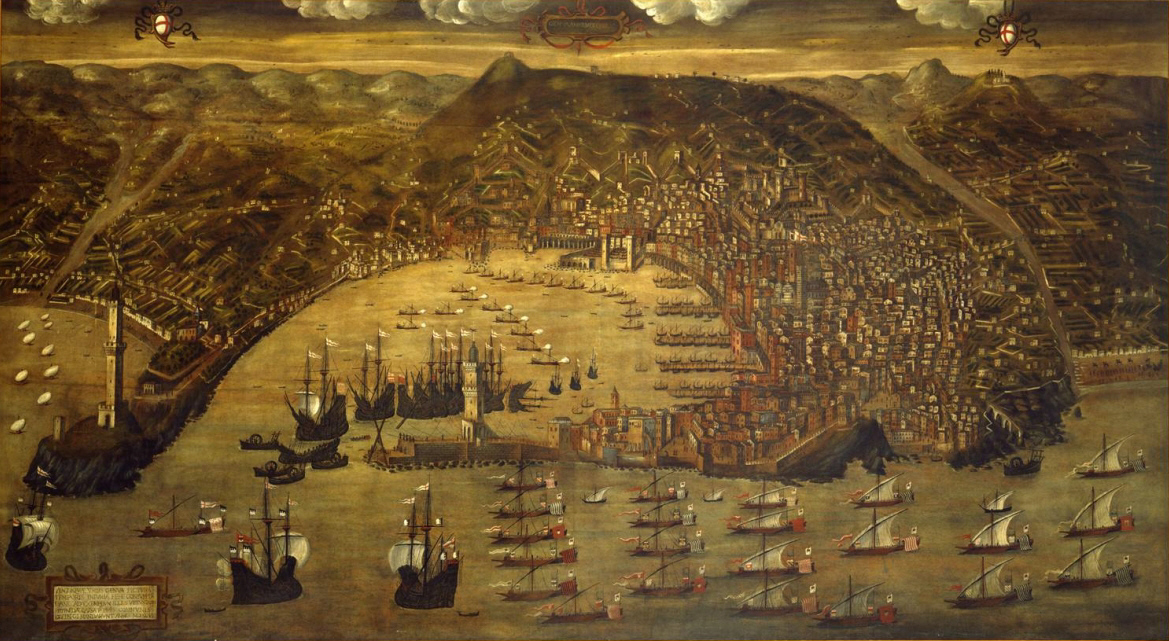
- Artist: Cristoforo de Grassi
- Year: c. A.D 1597
- Medium: Tempera on canvas
- Subject: Genoa, Italy
- Location: Galata Museo del Mare

The View of Genoa is a 16th century painting of the harbor of Genoa. The painting was done in tempera on canvas in 1597 by Genoese painter Cristoforo de Grassi.

== Description ==
View of Genoa depicts the harbor of the Italian city state of Genoa as it was in the late 15th century. The painting was started by an unknown artist in 1481, but was left incomplete. Cristoforo de Grassi, a painter who was often commissioned to portray naval scenes, was commissioned to finish the painting, which he did in 1597.

The painting depicts the city state of Genoa as it was in 1481. Heavy emphasis is placed upon Genoa's prominence as a trading and naval power, as can be seen with the abundance of ships. Several war galleys of the Genoese navy occupy the center of the harbor, and city's arsenal and famous lighthouse (the Laterna) can be seen. Two crests of Saint George (the patron saint of Genoa) are placed above the hills surrounding the city. The scene references the return of a Genoese fleet from an expedition against the Ottoman Turks.

The View of Genoa is currently on display at the Galata Museo del Mare in Genoa.
