= Jacques Coene =

Flemish painter, illustrator, and architect (1380 –1411)

Jacques Coene (active late 1380s – 1411) was a Flemish painter, illustrator, and architect. He worked in Belgium, France, and Italy. In 1399, he worked in the building of Milan Cathedral. He apparently had commissions from John, Duke of Berry and Philip the Bold.

Art historians sometimes attribute the Book of Hours created by the Boucicaut Master to him, however, this is no longer considered correct based on historical evidence.

== Bibliography ==
- Coene, Jacques; van den Gheyn, J (1911). Deux Livres d'heures <nos 10767 et 11051 de la Bibliothèque Royale de Belgique> attribués à l'enlumineur Jacques Coene [Two Books of hours <numbers 10767 and 11051 and the Royal Library of Belgium has attributed to the illuminator> Jacques Coene] (in French). Bruxelles: Vromant. OCLC 63258290.
- Durrieu, Paul (1906). Jacques Coene, peintre de Bruges, établi à Paris sous le règne de Charles VI, 1398-1404. [By Count Paul Durrieu. With plates.] [Jacques Coene, painter of Bruges, established in Paris under the reign of Charles VI, 1398-1404] (in French). Association pour la Publication des Monuments de l'Art Flamand (BRUGES). Bruxelles: Verbeke. OCLC 25716463.
- Heinritz, Ulrich (1993). "Eine Überlegung zu Jacques Coene". Zeitschrift für Kunstgeschichte (in German). 56 (1). Berlin, Germany: Deutscher Kunstverlag GmbH Munchen Berlin: 113–115. doi:10.2307/1482663. ISSN 0044-2992. JSTOR 1482663. OCLC 483193441.
