= Boucicaut Master =

French painter

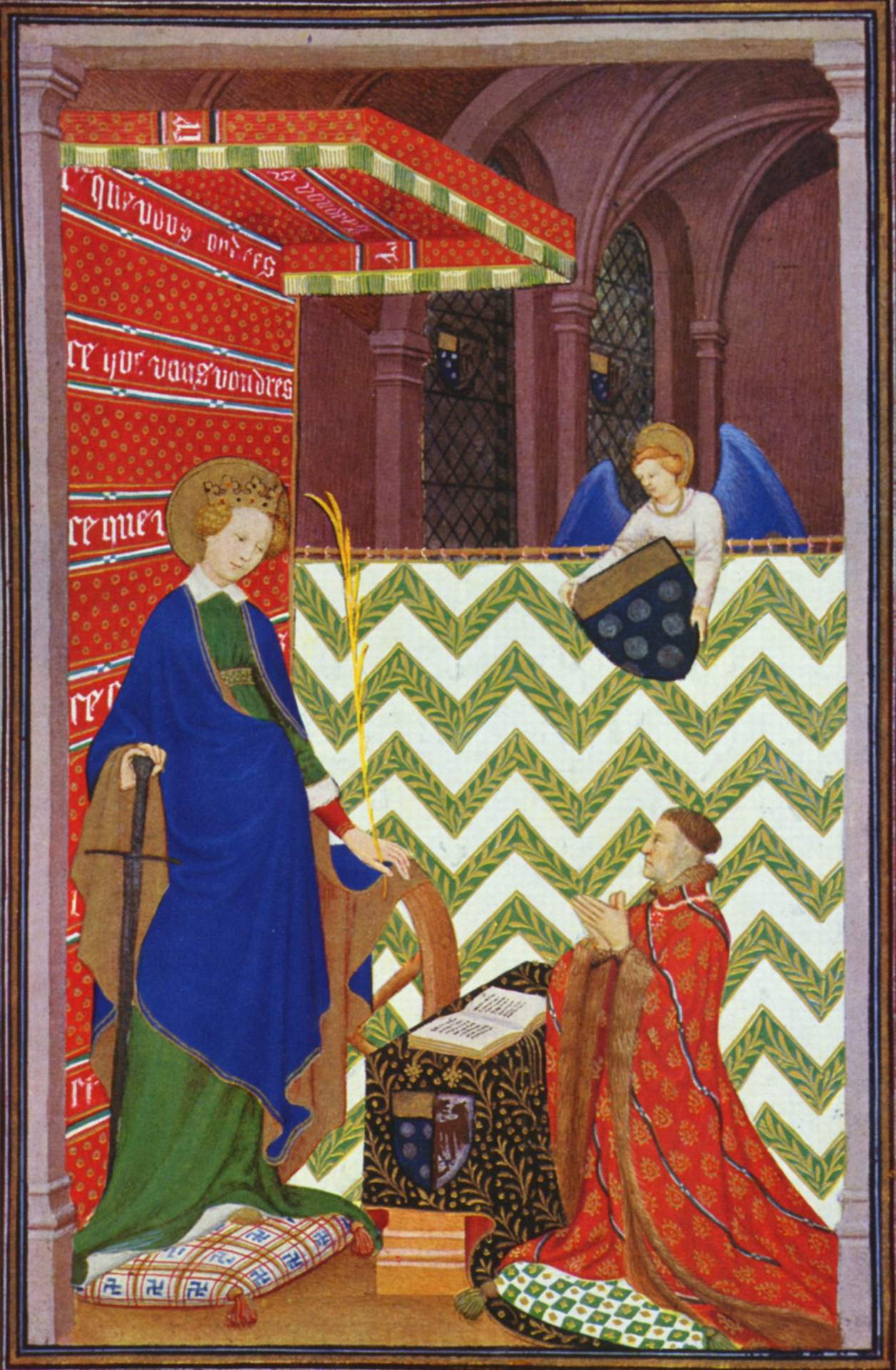
Heures de Maréchal de Boucicaut (Hours), Scene: The Marshal of Boucicaut praying to St. Catherine

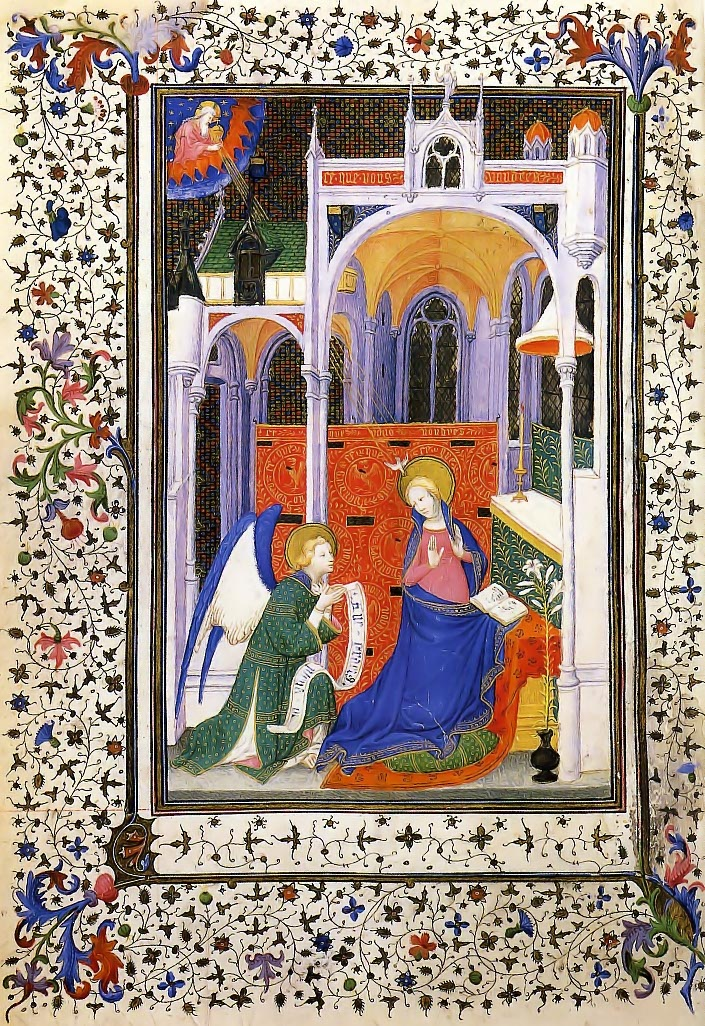
A page from the Hours of Boucicaut

The Boucicaut Master or Master of the Hours for Marshal Boucicaut was an anonymous French or Flemish miniaturist and illuminator active between 1400 and 1430 in Paris. He worked in the International Gothic style.

He is named after his illustrated book of hours for Jean II Le Meingre Boucicaut, Marshal of France, created between 1410 and 1415, now in the Musée Jacquemart-André in Paris.

The Master of Boucicaut was a contemporary of the Limbourg brothers and with them belonged to the most important and influential illuminators of manuscripts of the period in Northern Europe. He was probably the head of a productive workshop or studio in which artists fulfilled commissions for the court, the aristocracy and wealthy citizens. It is known that the artist also collaborated with the equally active Bedford Master in Paris.

The Boucicaut Master was advanced in terms of his depiction of light and perspective, based partly on developments in Italian painting. Based on style, many paintings and manuscripts are attributed to the artist. He has been associated with the Early Netherlandish painter, miniaturist, and architect Jacques Coene by some scholars, but it is now clear Coene was active in Paris too early for this to be plausible.
