= Lamba Doria =

Italian admiral

Lamba D'Oria (also spelled Doria) (1245–1323) was an admiral of the Republic of Genoa.

The brother of the capitano del popolo Oberto Doria, he was one of the best Genoese admirals, together with his descendant Andrea Doria. He defeated the Venetians in the battle of Curzola in 1298, where he took prisoner the admiral Andrea Dandolo (who subsequently committed suicide) and, according to a tradition, Marco Polo.

After his triumphal return to Genoa, the commune donated him a palace in the San Matteo Square and other lands at Savona, where today a Palazzo D'Oria Lamba is still existing (such as others in Genoa and Piedmont). He was also proclaimed capitano del popolo. Emperor Henry VII gave him the command of 40 galleys.
