= Truce of Leulinghem =

1389 truce between England and France

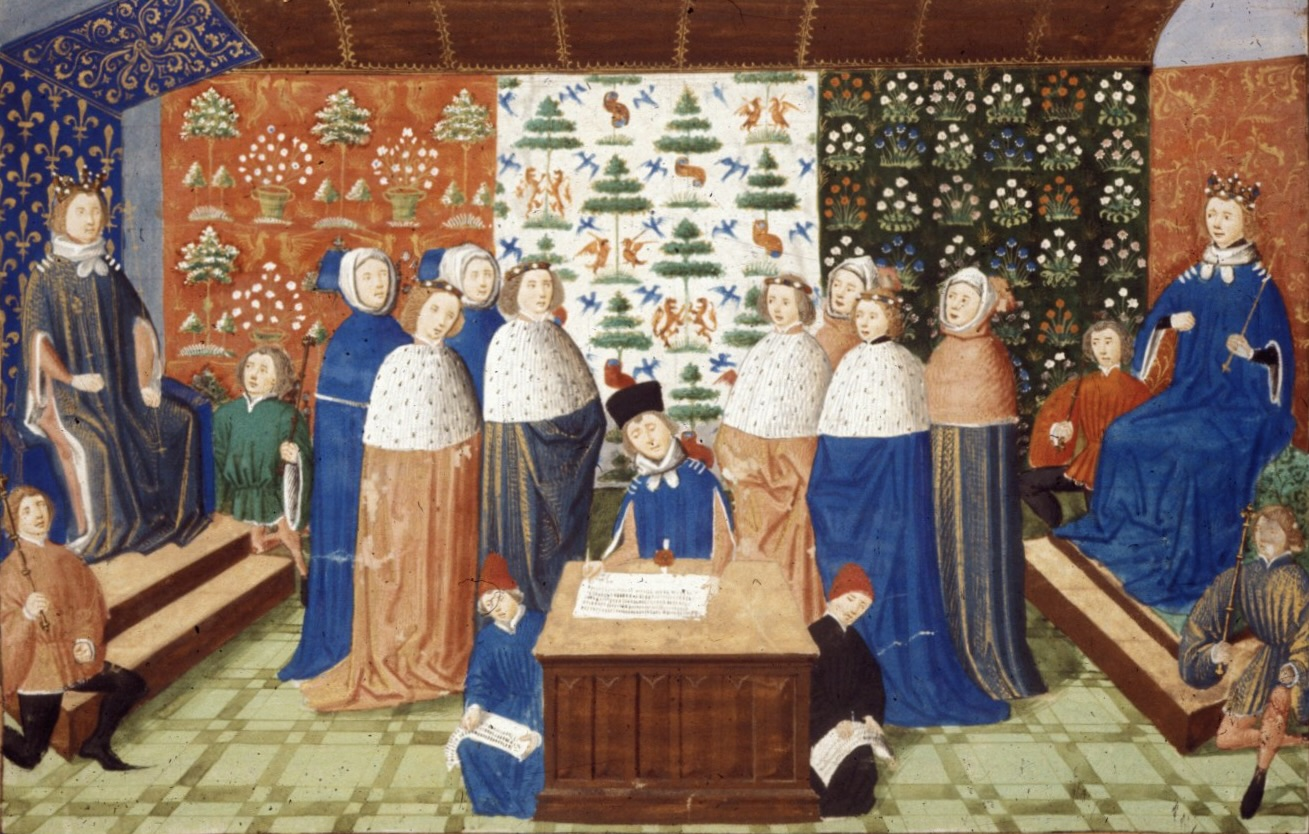
- Type: Temporary truce
- Drafted: June 1389
- Signed: June 1389
- Effective: 18 July 1389
- Condition: Continued peace negotiations; Joint crusade against the Turks; English support of French plan to end the Papal schism; Marriage alliance between England and France
- Expiration: Set to expire July 1416; was repudiated in August 1402
- Signatories: Richard II of England; Charles VI of France
- Parties: Kingdom of England; Kingdom of Portugal; Kingdom of France; Kingdom of Castile; Kingdom of Scotland
- Language: French

The Truce of Leulinghem was a truce agreed to by Richard II's kingdom of England and its allies, and Charles VI's kingdom of France and its allies, on 18 July 1389, ending the Caroline War of the Hundred Years' War. England was on the edge of financial collapse and suffering from internal political divisions. On the other side, Charles VI was suffering from a mental illness that handicapped the furthering of the war by the French government. Neither side was willing to concede on the primary cause of the war, the legal status of the Duchy of Aquitaine and the King of England's homage to the King of France through his possession of the duchy. However, both sides faced major internal issues that could badly damage their kingdoms if the war continued. The truce was originally negotiated by representatives of the kings to last three years, but the two kings met in person in the small village at Leulinghem, on the border of the English-owned Pale of Calais and French territory, and agreed to extend the truce to a twenty-seven years' period. Other provisions were agreed to, in attempts to bring an end to the Papal schism, to launch a joint crusade against the Turks in the Balkans, to seal the marriage of Richard to Charles' daughter Isabella along with an 800,000 franc dowry, and to guarantee to continue peace negotiations, to establish a lasting treaty between the kingdoms. The treaty brought peace to the Iberian Peninsula, where Portugal and Castile were supporting the English and French respectively. The English evacuated all their holdings in northern France except Calais.

The truce was the result of a decade of failed peace negotiations and inaugurated a thirteen years peace, the longest period of sustained peace during the Hundred Years' War. During the years following the truce, Richard reneged on his agreement to assist in ending the schism, leading the French to unilaterally withdraw from the obedience of either pope and seize Avignon by military force. French foreign policy also began to focus on Italy, and Genoa became a French protectorate. In England, Richard used the lapse in fighting to attack his political enemies and confiscate their lands, which he redistributed as rewards to his supporters. He then left for Ireland to put down a revolt among the Irish chieftains, but during his absence a number of his exiled opponents returned, led by his cousin Henry of Bolingbroke, Duke of Lancaster. Henry began an insurrection and seized most of England before Richard could return. Upon his return, Richard was imprisoned, and before he was starved to death he was forced to agree to abdicate. Henry was crowned in his place. The French initially interpreted events in England as a repudiation of the truce and raised an army and put garrisons in place on the fronts. Henry IV reaffirmed the truce which remained in place for several more years.

Henry made a number of aggressive political moves against France in the following years, marrying Joanna, widow of the duke of Brittany on February 7, 1403, and forming alliances with several German rulers, including a marriage alliance with Bavaria. Scotland was the first nation to break the truce, invading England in August in coordination with a revolt in Wales. The French reentered the conflict in September 1403, landing an army in Wales.

== Background ==
In 1369 the French government repudiated the 1360 Treaty of Brétigny, resuming the Hundred Years' War between the kingdom of France and the kingdom of England and their various allies. The war originated over the King of England's status as both a French duke and also an English king, creating conflicting interests in many of his actions. The French had declared the English duchy in southwestern France forfeit, beginning the war. The English won the first phase, and the treaty granted the English possession of the duchy as a fief independent of France. During the ensuing decade of peace, the French government strengthened and determined to establish control over the duchy. For nearly two decades, the French pursued a military policy of avoiding direct battle with the English armies and wearing them down by attrition. Although the English won a few victories, eventually almost all of their gains from the earlier phases of the war were lost, including all of the Duchy of Aquitaine except for a narrow coastal strip from Bordeaux to the border of Navarre.

By 1389 England was in the midst of political divisions. King Richard II, favoured making peace because the English parliament refused to grant sufficient funds to prosecute the war, the population had twice risen in revolt of the high taxation, and the nobility, led by his uncle the Duke of Gloucester, was attempting to subvert his control over the kingdom. France was also suffering from internal crisis. Charles VI was having recurring attacks of mental illness that paralyzed the government. During the 1380s a series of revolts occurred in the kingdom as a result of high taxation, beginning with the Harelle in 1383. As a result of these difficulties, the two kingdoms had been making attempts to negotiate a peace throughout the decade.

== Negotiations ==
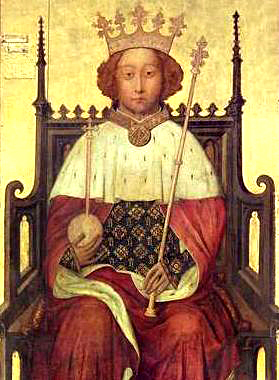
Richard II of England, ca 1390

In June 1389, high-level diplomats finished negotiations on a formal peace treaty in the village of Leulinghem, located right on the border of French territory and the English-owned Pale of Calais. England and its allies, Portugal, Ghent and the Duchy of Guelders, had been represented in the negotiations by John of Gaunt, Duke of Lancaster, and Thomas of Woodstock, Duke of Gloucester, the uncles of Richard II. France and its allies, the Kingdom of Castile and the Kingdom of Scotland, were represented by Philip the Bold, Duke of Burgundy, and John of Valois, Duke of Berry, the uncles of Charles VI. The Kingdom of Aragon, several counties of the low countries, and the Duchy of Brittany had already made peace and became neutral in the conflict. The Holy Roman Empire nominally supported the English position but had remained neutral in the conflict. One of those allied with Richard II and England was Donald Macdonald, Lord of the Isles.

Lower-level diplomats had been working out many of the details of the treaty in the years prior. France, overestimating England's ability to continue prosecuting the war, made major concessions, offering to return all the Duchy of Aquitaine to the English, except for the County of Poitou, permitting the English to maintain their fortress at Calais, and offering an indemnity of 1.5 million francs for English losses. In exchange, the King of England had to agree to do homage to the King of France in exchange for his duchy. The treaty would essentially restore to England everything lost in the course of the war except the full sovereignty of Aquitaine. Both delegations returned to their respective governments to have the treaty approved. In the interim, a three-year truce was agreed to go into effect on 18 July.

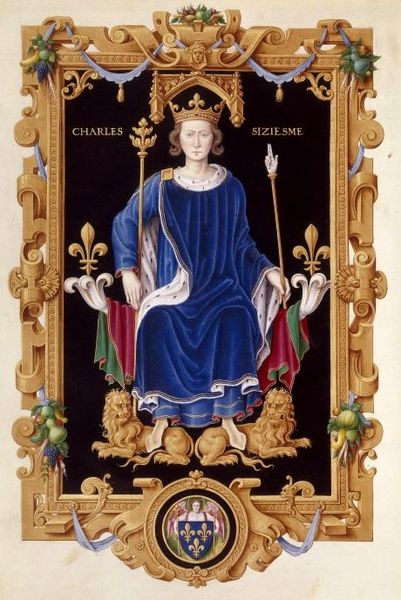
Charles VI of France

The French government was in effect led by the Duke of Burgundy since Charles VI's incapacity, and French approval was quickly granted. In England, Richard's political position was weak and the House of Commons of England in Parliament was controlled largely by the knights fighting the war. Richard feared open rebellion if he agreed to the treaty without the approval of Parliament, and called a session to consider the treaty. Parliament rejected the treaty, citing their fear of placing the king as a liege of the king of France and suggesting it would effectively make England a client kingdom of France. The Parliament also refused to pass a significant tax increase to continue funding the stalled war.

Richard decided to enact a de facto peace with the French and use the interim to punish his political enemies. On 15 May 1395 he received a French embassy to negotiate with him personally. It was agreed that he would marry the six-year-old daughter of Charles, Isabelle, and Charles would provide a dowry of 800,000 francs and extend the truce by five years. In exchange Richard began evacuating the ports he controlled in northern France, surrendering them all except Calais. Brest and Cherbourg were only evacuated after substantial payments by the local nobility were made in exchange. The two kings agreed to meet in future and finalize negotiations. Charles, however, remained in a fragile mental state and was frequently unaware of his surroundings. He made a temporary recovery in 1396, and the two kings met privately at Leulinghem over the course of two days and made a number of commitments. They agreed to a joint crusade against the Turks in the Balkans, Richard agreed to support French attempts to end the Papal schism and formally accepted Isabelle as his wife and received his dowry. The truce was extended by another nineteen years, and both men agreed to continue negotiations towards a permanent peace. With negotiations complete, both kings returned to their respective capitals and the truce remained in effect.

== Aftermath ==
In the aftermath of the treaty, Richard began taking revenge against his political enemies. Several men with large landed estates were dispossessed and executed or exiled. Their property was assigned to allies of Richard, who was attempting to create a bloc of allies in central England. Richard failed to send support for the crusade against the Turks; the French contingent, which contained many of France's prominent fighters, was annihilated at the Battle of Nicopolis in September 1396. Some of Richard's advisers suggested reopening the war, but he rejected the idea. Richard also repudiated his agreement to end the papal schism and continued to support the Roman pope over the Avignon pope. This led the French to unilaterally withdraw support for either pope and to seize Avignon by force. Richard's attacks against the landed nobility were met with hostility which remained suppressed for a time. After the death of John of Gaunt in 1399, Richard seized his duchy from his exiled son, Henry of Bolingbroke. Bolingbroke had taken up residence in Paris, where many of his fellow exiles began plotting a return to England. Richard left England to suppress a revolt in Ireland during 1399 and while he was away Henry led a small army back to England and seized his former estate by force. He quickly raised an army among the rest of the disaffected nobility and took control of most of England without force before Richard could return. Upon his return, Richard was forced to abdicate and was then starved to death. Henry was crowned King.

French foreign policy shifted in the years following the truce, and the focus was placed on Italy as the French attempted to gain a foothold whereby they could force the Roman pope to abdicate. Genoa became a French protectorate. Charles's mental state continued to deteriorate, leading to more fighting in the court, with his wife allying with his uncles in opposition of Charles's brother, Louis of Orleans, Duke of Touraine. When Henry took the throne in England, the French initially interpreted it as a repudiation of the truce and raised an army and strengthened their garrisons on their borders. An embassy to England reconfirmed the truce with Henry.

== Repudiation ==
Henry made a number of aggressive political moves toward France in the following years, marrying the dowager duchess of Brittany, Joan of Navarre in April 1402, giving him control over the two largest duchies with ties to France. The French responded by making one of Charles' sons Duke of Guyenne, a part of the Duchy of Aquitaine which the French claimed was forfeit. Henry formed alliances with several German states, including a marriage alliance with Bavaria. Scotland was the first nation to break the truce, invading England in August in coordination with a revolt in Wales. The Welsh revolt was likely influenced by the French. The French reentered the conflict in September 1403, landing an army in Wales. The thirteen-year truce was the longest period of peace between England and France in the Hundred Years' War. The war continued intermittently for another five decades.

== See also ==
- Merciless Parliament: English parliament of 1388

== Sources ==
- Sumption, Jonathan (2009). The Hundred Years War: Divided Houses. University of Pennsylvania Press. ISBN 978-0-571-13897-5.
