= Battle of Curzola =

1298 Genonese naval victory over Venice

- Part of the War of Curzola
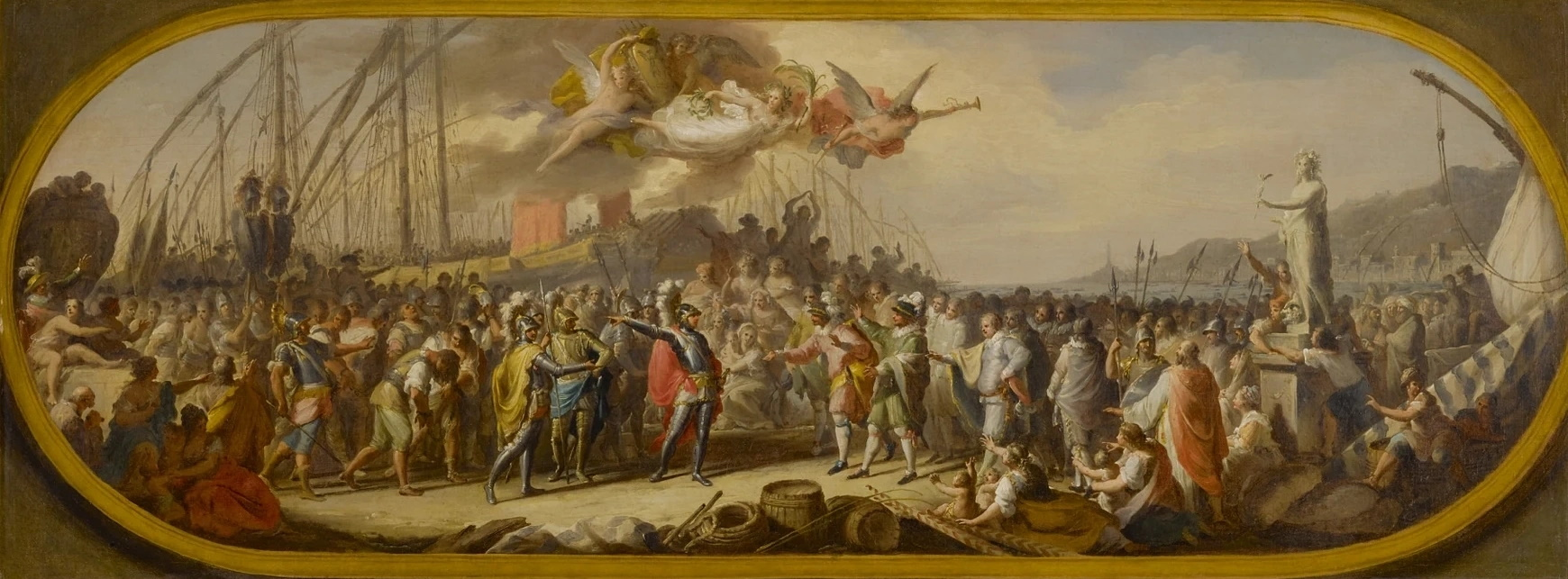
- The Triumph of Lamba Doria
| Date | September 8, 1298 |
| Location | Curzola, Adriatic Sea, Dalmatia 42°52′03″N 16°58′24″E |
| Result | Genoese victory |

Belligerents
| Republic of Genoa | Republic of Venice |

Commanders and leaders
| Lamba Doria | Andrea Dandolo †; Matteo Quirini † |

Strength
| 66–75 galleys | 95 galleys |

Casualties and losses
| Heavy | 7,000–9,000 (Note: 5,000–7,000 captured) killed 65–83 galleys lost |
- Location within Croatia

The Battle of Curzola (today Korčula, southern Dalmatia, now in Croatia) was a naval battle fought on 9 September 1298 between the Genoese and Venetian navies. It was a disaster for Venice, a major setback among the many battles fought in the 13th and 14th centuries between Pisa, Genoa, and Venice in a long series of wars for the control of Mediterranean and Levantine trade.

== Battle ==
The battle took place in the channel between the island of Curzola (Korčula) and the mainland peninsula of Sabbioncello (Pelješac), and ashore, where Venetian troops had been landed on the island's far side. The Venetians were led by Admiral Andrea Dandolo, son of Doge Giovanni Dandolo, and the Genoese by Lamba Doria, whose son was killed in the fighting: "Throw my son overboard into the deep sea," Doria was said to have ordered. "What better resting place can we give him?".

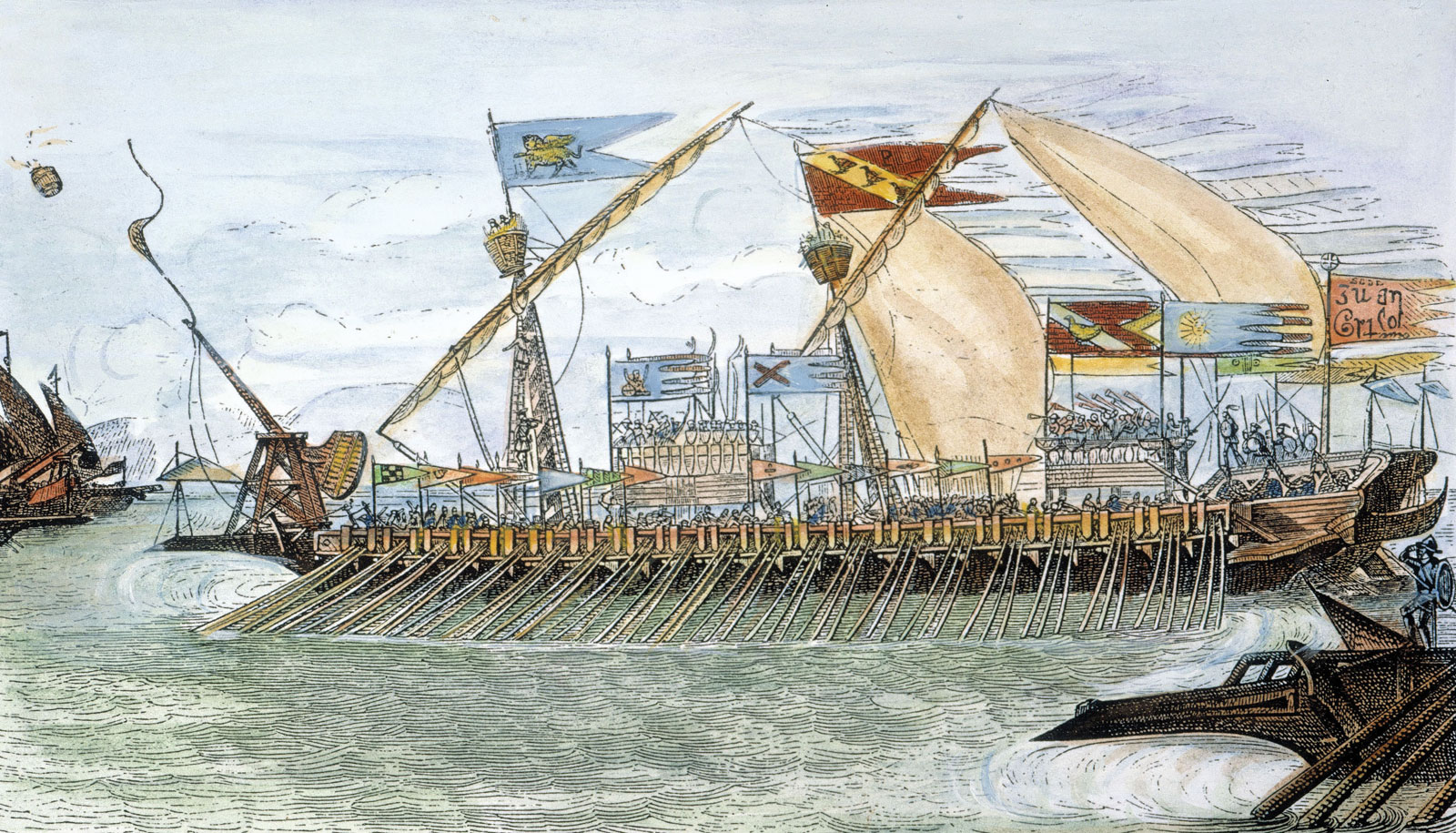
Venetian galley at Curzola

The fleets of the two states were apparently equal in number, but, after the Venetians ran their galleys aground while trying to capture the Genoese galleys, Doria exhibited superior strategy and managed to inflict a resounding defeat on his enemies. The disaster seemed almost complete for Venice: 83 of their 95 ships were destroyed and about 7,000 men were killed. Dandolo was captured by the Genoese but committed suicide soon afterwards. Venice suffered heavy losses, but she managed to immediately equip another 100 galleys and sought to obtain reasonable peace conditions that did not significantly hamper its power and prosperity.

According to a later tradition (16th century) recorded by Giovanni Battista Ramusio, Marco Polo was one of those among the Venetian prisoners and he dictated his famous book during the few months of his imprisonment; but whether he was actually captured at this battle or at a previous minor engagement near Laiazzo is unclear.
