= Battle of Modon (1403) =

Last major battle between the Venetians and the Genoese

- Part of the Venetian–Genoese wars
Date	7 October 1403
Location	off Modon
Result	Venetian victory

Belligerents
Republic of Venice	Republic of Genoa (under French control)

Commanders and leaders
Carlo Zeno	Marshal Boucicaut

Strength
11 galleys 2 round ships	11 galleys 2 transports

Casualties and losses
153 wounded	600 killed & wounded 300 captured 3 galleys captured

The Battle of Modon was fought on 7 October 1403 between the fleets of the Republic of Venice and of the Republic of Genoa, then under French control, commanded by the French marshal Jean Le Maingre, better known as Boucicaut. One of the last clashes in the Venetian–Genoese wars, the battle ended in a decisive Venetian victory.

== Background ==
Tensions between the Republic of Venice and its old rival, the Republic of Genoa, rose again in 1402, as reports came in of Genoese pirates attacking Venetian merchant shipping. The Venetians authorised the captain-general of the Sea, Carlo Zeno, to mobilise the fleet and take measures to combat Genoese piracy.

In April 1403, a Genoese fleet of nine galleys, seven round ships, a galleass, and a horse transport, had sailed from Genoa under the command of the French Marshal Boucicaut, and made for Cyprus, to strengthen Genoese influence there. On its way, the fleet passed by the Venetian outpost of Modon in southwestern Greece, but no hostilities took place, and Boucicaut led his fleet on to Cyprus. After carrying out his mission there, the French commander, a "fervent crusader", launched attacks on Muslim cities on the Levantine coast. Among others, Beirut was sacked, an event which angered the Venetians further since most of the booty the Genoese took there actually belonged to Venetian merchants. In September, Boucicaut, at the head of eleven galleys and two transport cogs, set sail for the return journey.

== Battle ==
The Genoese fleet arrived at Modon on 4 October, only to find a Venetian fleet of eleven galleys and two round ships waiting for them. Anticipating a battle, Zeno moved his ships out into the bay, while the Genoese anchored at the offshore island of Sapienza. In the early morning of 7 October the Genoese started to sail north, but were pursued by the Venetians. The ensuing battle was hard-fought, particularly between the flagships of the two opposing fleets, which closed on one another and engaged in hand-to-hand combat. The battle was decided by the Venetian round ship Pisana, which captured three Genoese galleys, leading Boucicaut to break off and retreat. The Genoese had 600 casualties, and a further 300 as prisoners of war aboard the three captured vessels, while the Venetians had suffered only 153 wounded.

== Aftermath ==
Boucicaut scored a small revanche on the Venetians on his way back to Genoa, capturing a large Venetian merchant galley and a cog. After long negotiations, on 22 March 1404 an initial agreement was reached between Venice and Genoa, stipulating on the one hand Genoese reimbursement for Venetian losses in Cyprus and Beirut, and on the other the return of the ships and prisoners captired at Modon. Due to the intransigence of Boucicaut, this agreement was never ratified, but neither were hostilities resumed, as the Genoese were opposed to a conflict with Venice. Finally, the issue was settled with the Treaty of Genoa on 28 June 1406, only a few months before Boucicaut's ouster from Genoa. Both parties agreed to recompense each other, initially appointing five arbitrators to establish the sums owed. These were soon replaced by a new mediator Amadeus VIII of Savoy.

The internal instability of Genoa meant that the Battle of Modon was the last major challenge offered by the Genoese to Venetian maritime hegemony and its dominance of the eastern trade routes. The latter would be soon shaken, however, by the rise of the Ottoman Empire.

== Bibliography ==
- Balard, Michel (2017). "La lotta contro Genova". Gênes et la mer - Genova e il mare (in Italian). Vol. II. Genoa: Società Ligure di Storia Patria. pp. 575–645. ISBN 978-88-97099-42-0.
- Rogers, Clifford J., ed. (2010). "Modon, Battle of". The Oxford Encyclopedia of Medieval Warfare and Military Technology. Oxford University Press. pp. 13–14. ISBN 978-0-195334036.
- Setton, Kenneth M. (1976). The Papacy and the Levant (1204–1571), Volume I: The Thirteenth and Fourteenth Centuries. Philadelphia, Pennsylvania: The American Philosophical Society. pp. 378ff. ISBN 0-87169-114-0.
