= Andrea Dandolo (admiral) =

Andrea Dandolo (died September 1298) was a Venetian nobleman and admiral. He served as the commander of the Venetian fleet during the Battle of Curzola on 8 September 1298, a major naval conflict between the Republic of Venice and the Republic of Genoa. The battle ended in a disastrous defeat for Venice.

Among those captured during the battle was Marco Polo, who reportedly began writing his Travels while imprisoned. Dandolo was also taken prisoner by the Genoese. According to contemporary accounts, unable to bear the shame of such a loss, he committed suicide by repeatedly striking his head against the wooden hull of the galley transporting him to prison, thus depriving his captors of the satisfaction of executing him.

He shared his surname with the prominent Dandolo family of Venice, but no direct genealogical connection to other well-known members of the family, such as Enrico Dandolo or the later Doge Andrea Dandolo, has been established in historical sources.
