= List of battles involving the Republic of Venice =

The following is a list of battles fought by the Republic of Venice, from the traditional date of its founding in 697 until its dissolution in 1797, organized by date. The list includes both land and sea engagements, and is not exhaustive.

== 9th century ==
Date	Location	Conflict	Commander	Allies	Opponents	Outcome	Refs
887, September 18	Makro, Dalmatia		Doge Pietro I Candiano	—	Narentine pirates	Venetian defeat, death of Candiano.	

== 10th century ==
Date	Location	Conflict	Commander	Allies	Opponents	Outcome	Refs
900, June 29	Venice	Magyar raid on Venice	Doge Pietro Tribuno	—	Hungarians	Venetian victory	
948	Dalmatia		Doge Pietro III Candiano	—	Narentine pirates	Venetian defeat, obligation for annual tribute to the Narentines	
998, Ascension Day	Dalmatia		Doge Pietro Orseolo II	—	Narentine pirates	Venetian victory, cessation of the tribute	
1000	Lastovo, Dalmatia		Doge Pietro Orseolo II	—	Citizens of Lastovo	Venetian victory, annexation of Lastovo	

== 11th century ==
Date	Location	Conflict	Commander	Allies	Opponents	Outcome	Refs
1004	Dalmatia		Doge Pietro Orseolo II	—	Narentine pirates	Venetian victory, subjugation of the Narentines	
1081	Dyrrhachium	First Norman invasion of Byzantium	Doge Domenico Selvo	—	Italo-Norman fleet under Robert Guiscard	Venetian victory, destruction of the Norman fleet; Battle of Dyrrhachium	

== 12th century ==
Date	Location	Conflict	Commander	Allies	Opponents	Outcome	Refs
1110, October 19 – December 5	Sidon	Norwegian Crusade	Doge Ordelafo Faliero	Kingdom of Jerusalem, Kingdom of Norway	Fatimid Caliphate garrison	Venetian–Crusader victory, capture of the city, creation of the Lordship of Sidon	

== 13th century ==
Date	Location	Conflict	Commander	Allies	Opponents	Outcome	Refs
1202, November 10–24	Zara, Damlatia	Fourth Crusade	Doge Enrico Dandolo	Crusaders	Citizens of Zara (nominally Hungarian)	Venetian–Crusader victory, sack of the city	
1203, July 11 – August 1	Constantinople	Fourth Crusade	Doge Enrico Dandolo	Crusaders	Byzantines under Alexios III Angelos	Venetian–Crusader victory, flight of Alexios III and coronation of Alexios IV Angelos	
1204, April 8–13	Constantinople	Fourth Crusade	Doge Enrico Dandolo	Crusaders	Byzantines under Alexios V Doukas	Venetian–Crusader victory, sack of the city, dissolution of the Byzantine Empire	
1257–1258	Negroponte, Greece	War of the Euboeote Succession	Marco Gradenigo	Duchy of Athens and the Lombard Triarchs of Negroponte	Achaean garrison	Venetian victory, recapture of Negroponte	
1258, June 25	Acre	War of Saint Sabas	Lorenzo Tiepolo	—	Genoese fleet under Rosso della Turca	Venetian victory, Genoese abandon Acre	
1263	Settepozzi, Greece	War of Saint Sabas and Byzantine–Venetian wars	Gilberto Dandolo	—	Genoese fleet	Venetian victory	
1264, August 14	off Saseno, Albania	War of Saint Sabas	Michele Duaro	—	Genoese fleet under Simone Grillo	Genoese victory, capture of a Venetian trade convoy	
1264, September 2–?	Tyre	War of Saint Sabas	Andrea Barozzi	—	Philip of Montfort, Lord of Tyre	Siege aborted after a few days	
1266, June 23	off Trapani, Sicily	War of Saint Sabas	Jacopo Dondulo	—	Genoese fleet under Lanfranco Borbonino	Crushing Venetian victory, Genoese fleet captured	
1298, September 9	off Curzola, Dalmatia	War of Saint Sabas	Andrea Dandolo	—	Genoese fleet under Lamba Doria	Genoese victory	

== 14th century ==
Date	Location	Conflict	Commander	Allies	Opponents	Outcome	Refs
1334, autumn	Gulf of Adramyttion	Naval League of 1332	Unknown	Knights Hospitaller, Kingdom of Cyprus, Papal States	Beylik of Karasi	Naval League victory	
1344, May 13	Pallene peninsula, Chalcidice	Smyrniote crusades	Unknown	Knights Hospitaller, Kingdom of Cyprus, Papal States	Turkish pirates	Christian victory	
1345, August 12 – 1346, December 21	Zara, Dalmatia	Croatian-Venetian wars and Hungarian–Venetian wars		—	Citizens of Zara, aided by the Kingdom of Hungary	Venetian victory, annexation of the city	
1347, April	Imbros island, Aegean Sea	Smyrniote crusades	Unknown	Knights Hospitaller	Turkish pirates (Beylik of Sarukhan/Beylik of Aydin?)	Christian victory	
1354, November 4	Bay of Pylos	Third Venetian–Genoese War	Niccolò Pisani	—	Genoese fleet under Paganino Doria	Genoese victory	
1359	Megara Gulf	Naval League of 1359	Unknown	Knights Hospitaller	Turkish pirates	Christian victory	
1378	Traù, Dalmatia	War of Chioggia	Vettor Pisani	—	Genoese fleet under Luciano Doria and citizens of Traù	Genoese victory	
1378, May 30	off Anzio, Italy	War of Chioggia	Vettor Pisani	—	Genoese fleet under Luigi de' Fieschi	Venetian victory	
1379, May 7	Pola, Istria	War of Chioggia	Vettor Pisani	—	Genoese fleet under Luciano Doria	Genoese victory	
1380, June 24	Chioggia, Venetian Lagoon	War of Chioggia	Doge Andrea Contarini, Vettor Pisani, Carlo Zeno	—	Genoese fleet under Pietro Doria	Decisive Venetian victory, breaking of the siege of Venice	

== 15th century ==
Date	Location	Conflict	Commander	Allies	Opponents	Outcome	Refs
1403, October 7	off Modon, Greece	Venetian–Genoese wars	Carlo Zeno	—	Genoese fleet under the French Marshal Boucicaut	Venetian victory	
1412, August 24	Motta di Livenza, Veneto	Hungarian–Venetian wars	Carlo Malatesta	—	Hungarian forces of Sigismund of Luxembourg	Venetian victory, consolidation of Venetian rule over Dalmatia	
1416, May 29	northern entrance of the Dardanelles	Ottoman–Venetian Wars	Pietro Loredan	—	Ottoman fleet under Çali Bey	Venetian victory, death of Çali Bey	
1423, September 14 – 1430, March 29	Thessalonica and northern Aegean	Ottoman–Venetian Wars	Various commanders	—	Ottomans under Murad II and various commanders	Ottoman victory, capture of Thessalonica	
1427, October 11	Maclodio, Lombardy	Wars in Lombardy	Francesco Bussone da Carmagnola	Duchy of Mantua	Milanese army, under Carlo Malatesta	Venetian victory, Malatesta taken captive	
1431, March	Soncino, Lombardy	Wars in Lombardy	Francesco Bussone da Carmagnola	—	Milanese army, under Francesco I Sforza	Milanese victory	
1431, June 6	Po River, near Cremona	Wars in Lombardy	Niccolò Trevisani	—	Milanese army, under Francesco I Sforza	Milanese victory	
1432, November 18–19	Delebio, Lombardy	Wars in Lombardy	Giorgio Corner, Cesare Martinengo, Taddeo d'Este	—	Milanese army under Niccolò Piccinino	Milanese victory	
1440, June 29	Anghiari, Tuscany	Wars in Lombardy	Micheletto Attendolo, under the overall command of Cardinal Ludovico Trevisan	Republic of Florence, Papal States	Milanese army under Niccolò Piccinino	Allied victory	
1448, September 15	Caravaggio, Lombardy	Wars in Lombardy and Milanese War of Succession	Micheletto Attendolo	Republic of Florence, Papal States	Milanese army under Francesco Sforza	Milanese victory	
1452, June 6 - 8	Pontevico, Lombardy	Wars in Lombardy		—	Milanese army under Francesco Sforza	Milanese victory	
1453, May 25 - 29	Pontevico, Lombardy	Wars in Lombardy	Jacopo Piccinino	—	Milanese army under Francesco Sforza	Venetian victory	
1453, June 14 – November 27	Orzinuovi, Lombardy	Wars in Lombardy	Bertoldo d'Este	—	Milanese-French army under Francesco Sforza and René of Anjou	Milanese victory, Venice loses Bassa Bresciana Occidentale	The French army joined the battle since the autumn.
1453, August 15	Ghedi, Lombardy	Wars in Lombardy and Milanese War of Succession	Jacopo Piccinino	—	Milanese–Mantuan army under Francesco Sforza	Milanese victory, Venice loses Bassa Bresciana Orientale	
1453, October 16 - 19	Pontevico, Lombardy	Wars in Lombardy	Jacopo Piccinino	—	Milanese-French army under Francesco Sforza and René of Anjou	Milanese victory, Venice loses Bassa Bresciana Centrale	
1467, July 25	Molinella, Emilia		Bartolomeo Colleoni	Duchy of Ferrara, Pesaro and Forlì	Florentine army under Federico da Montefeltro	Indecisive	
1470, July 10 – August 5	Negroponte, Greece	First Ottoman–Venetian War	Paolo Erizzo (garrison), Nicolò Canal (fleet)	—	Ottoman army under Sultan Mehmed II	Ottoman victory, capture of the city and island of Negroponte	
1478, May – 1479, April 25	Scutari, Albania	First Ottoman–Venetian War	various commanders	Lordship of Zeta, local Albanian forces	Ottoman army under Sultan Mehmed II and other commanders	Ottoman victory, capture of the city and end of the war	
1487, August 10	Calliano, Trentino	War of Rovereto	Roberto Sanseverino d'Aragona	—	Armies of the Bishopric of Trent and the County of Tyrol	Decisive allied victory, death of Sanseverino	
1495, July 6	Fornovo, Emilia	Italian War of 1494–1498	Francesco II Gonzaga	Duchy of Milan, Margravate of Mantua	French army under King Charles VIII	French victory	
1499, August 12, 20, 22, and 25	Bay of Pylos, Greece	Second Ottoman–Venetian War	Antonio Grimani	—	Ottoman fleet under Kemal Reis	Ottoman victory	
1500, November 8 – December 24	Castle of Saint George, Cephalonia	Second Ottoman–Venetian War	Benedetto Pesaro (fleet), under the overall command of Gonzalo Fernández de Córdoba	Spain	Ottoman garrison under Gisdar Aga	Allied victory, capture of the fortress	

== 16th century ==
Date	Location	Conflict	Commander	Allies	Opponents	Outcome	Refs
1509, December 22	River Po at Polesella, Veneto	War of the League of Cambrai	Angelo Trevisan	—	Ferrarese fleet under Cardinal d'Este	Ferrarese victory	
1513, October 7	Schio, Veneto	War of the League of Cambrai	Bartolomeo d'Alviano	—	Spanish–Imperial army under Ramón de Cardona and Fernando d'Ávalos	Decisive Spanish–Imperial victory	
1515, September 13–14	Melegnano, Lombardy	War of the League of Cambrai	Bartolomeo d'Alviano, under the overall command of King Francis I of France	Kingdom of France	Swiss–Milanese army under Maximilian Sforza	Decisive French–Venetian victory	
1537, August – September	Corfu, Greece	Third Ottoman–Venetian War		—	Ottoman army and fleet (plus a French contingent) under Sultan Suleiman the Magnificent	Venetian victory	
1538, September 28	off Preveza, Greece	Third Ottoman–Venetian War	Vincenzo Cappello, under the overall command of Andrea Doria	Holy League forces	Ottoman fleet under Hayreddin Barbarossa	Ottoman victory	
1570, July 22 – September 9	Nicosia, Cyprus	Fourth Ottoman–Venetian War	Niccolò Dandolo	—	Ottoman army under Lala Kara Mustafa Pasha	Ottoman victory, sack of the city	
1570, September 17 – 1571, August 5	Famagusta, Cyprus	Fourth Ottoman–Venetian War	Marco Antonio Bragadin	—	Ottoman army under Lala Kara Mustafa Pasha	Ottoman victory, sack of the city, end of Venetian resistance in Cyprus	
1571, October 7	off Lepanto, Greece	Fourth Ottoman–Venetian War	Sebastiano Venier, under the overall command of John of Austria	Holy League forces	Ottoman fleet under Müezzinzade Ali Pasha	Holy League victory	

== 17th century ==
Date	Location	Conflict	Commander	Allies	Opponents	Outcome	Refs
1618, June 24	Strait of Gibraltar		Melcior van den Kerchove	—	Spanish fleet	Venetian victory, breakthrough of the Venetian fleet	
1646, May 26	off the Dardanelles Strait	Cretan War	Tommaso Alvise Mocenigo	—	Ottoman fleet	Venetian victory	
1648, May 1 – 1669, September 27	Candia, Crete	Cretan War	Various commanders	Knights of Malta, Kingdom of France	Ottoman army under various commanders	Ottoman victory, surrender of Candia and end of the Cretan War	
1649, May 12	off Foça	Cretan War	Giacomo da Riva	—	Ottoman fleet under Koca Dervish Mehmed Pasha	Venetian victory	
1651, July 10	south of Naxos, Aegean Sea	Cretan War	Tommaso Alvise Mocenigo	—	Ottoman fleet	Venetian victory	
1654, May 15	Perast	Cretan War	Krsto Vicković	—	Ottoman army of Herzegovina, Uljinj pirates	Venetian victory	
1654, May 16	off the Dardanelles Strait	Cretan War	Giuseppe Delfino	Knights of Malta	Ottoman fleet under Kara Murat Pasha	Ottoman victory	
1655, June 21	off the Dardanelles Strait	Cretan War	Lazzaro Mocenigo	Knights of Malta	Ottoman fleet under Kara Mustafa Pasha	Venetian victory	
1656, June 26	off the Dardanelles Strait	Cretan War	Lorenzo Marcello	Knights of Malta	Ottoman fleet under Kenan Pasha	Venetian victory, Venetian occupation of Tenedos and Lemnos	
1657, May 3		Cretan War	Lazzaro Mocenigo	—	Ottoman Algerian fleet	Venetian victory	
1657, May 18		Cretan War		—	Ottoman fleet	Venetian victory	
1657, July 17–19	off the Dardanelles Strait	Cretan War	Lazzaro Mocenigo	Knights of Malta, Papal States	Ottoman fleet under Topal Mehmed Pasha	Ottoman victory, breaking of the Venetian blockade of the Dardanelles	
1661, August 27	near Milos, Aegean Sea	Cretan War	Giorgio Morosini	Knights of Malta	Ottoman galley fleet	Venetian victory	
1662, September 29	between Kos and Kalymnos, Aegean Sea	Cretan War		—	Ottoman convoy from Alexandria	Venetian victory	
1684, July 21 – August 6	Fortress of Santa Maura, Lefkada	Morean War	Francesco Morosini	—	Ottoman garrison of Santa Maura	Venetian victory, surrender of the fortress and island	
1686, June 2–14	New Navarino fortress, Morea	Morean War	Otto Wilhelm Königsmarck	—	Ottoman garrison	Venetian victory, surrender of the fortress	
1686, July 30 – August 29	Nauplia, Morea	Morean War	Otto Wilhelm Königsmarck	—	Ottoman garrison of Nauplia and relief army under Ismail Pasha	Venetian victory, surrender of the city	
1687, July 24	Patras, Morea	Morean War	Francesco Morosini, Otto Wilhelm Königsmarck	—	Ottoman army under Mehmed Pasha	Venetian victory, surrender of Patras Castle and Rio Castle	
1687, September 23–29	Acropolis of Athens	Morean War	Francesco Morosini	—	Ottoman garrison of the Acropolis	Venetian victory, surrender of the Acropolis	
1688, July 13 – October 21	Negroponte, Central Greece	Morean War	Francesco Morosini	—	Ottoman garrison of Negroponte	Ottoman victory, raising of the siege	
1690, September 8	off Lesbos, Aegean Sea	Morean War	Daniele Dolfin	—	Ottoman fleet	Inconclusive	
1695, February 9 & 19	off the Oinousses islands, Aegean Sea	Morean War	Giovanni Antonio Zeno	—	Ottoman fleet under Mezzo Morto Hüseyin Pasha	Ottoman victory	
1696, August 22	off Andros, Aegean Sea	Morean War	Bartolomeo Contarini	Papal States	Ottoman fleet under Mezzo Morto Hüseyin Pasha	Indecisive	
1698, September 20	off Samothrace, northern Aegean Sea	Morean War		—	Ottoman fleet	Inconclusive	

== 18th century ==
Date	Location	Conflict	Commander	Allies	Opponents	Outcome	Refs
1715, July 12–20	Nauplia, Greece	Seventh Ottoman–Venetian War	Geronimo Dolfin, Alessandro Bon	—	Ottomans under Silahdar Damat Ali Pasha	Decisive Ottoman victory, fall of the Kingdom of the Morea	
1716, July 8 – August 21	Corfu, Greece	Seventh Ottoman–Venetian War	Johann Matthias von der Schulenburg, Andrea Pisani	Knights of Malta, Grand Duchy of Tuscany, Papal States, Spain	Ottomans under Canım Hoca Mehmed Pasha and Kara Mustafa Pasha	Venetian victory, Ottomans abandon Corfu	
1716, July 8	Corfu Channel, Greece	Seventh Ottoman–Venetian War	Andrea Corner	—	Ottoman fleet under Canım Hoca Mehmed Pasha	Indecisive	
1717, June 12–16	off Imbros, Aegean Sea	Seventh Ottoman–Venetian War	Lodovico Flangini		Ottoman fleet under Hodja Ibrahim Pasha	Indecisive, death of Flangini	
1717, July 19	off Cape Matapan, Greece	Seventh Ottoman–Venetian War	Marcantonio Diedo	Kingdom of Portugal, Knights of Malta, Papal States	Ottoman fleet under Eğribozlu Pasha	Indecisive	
1784 – 1788	Porto Farina, Tunis, Sfax, Bizerte, Sousse, Tunisia		Angelo Emo, Tommaso Condulmier		Beylik of Tunis under Hammuda ibn Ali	Venetian victory	
