= Battle of the Dardanelles =

Battle of the Dardanelles may refer to:

During the Ottoman–Venetian War of 1645–1669:

- Battle of the Dardanelles (1654), Ottoman victory led by Kara Murad Pasha over the Venetian armada
- Battle of the Dardanelles (1655), Venetian victory led by Lazzaro Mocenigo over the Ottoman armada
- Battle of the Dardanelles (1656), Venetian victory led by Lorenzo Marcello over the Ottoman armada
- Battle of the Dardanelles (1657), Ottoman victory led by Koprulu Mehmed Pasha over the Venetian armada

During other conflicts:

- Dardanelles operation, during the Anglo-Turkish War (1807–1809)
- Battle of the Dardanelles (1807), during the Russo-Turkish War (1806–1812)
- Battle of Elli (1912), during the First Balkan War
- Naval operations in the Dardanelles campaign (1915–16), during the First World War
