= Battle of Gallipoli (disambiguation) =

The Battle of Gallipoli was fought by the Entente powers against the Ottoman Empire on the Gallipoli peninsula between 1915 and 1916.

Battle of Gallipoli may also refer to:

- Battle of Gallipoli (1312), a battle between the Byzantine Empire and Turkish raiders
- Fall of Gallipoli, the 1354 capture of Gallipoli by the Ottomans
- Reconquest of Gallipoli, the 1366 recapture of Gallipoli for Byzantium by Amadeus VI of Savoy
- Battle of Gallipoli (1416), a naval battle between the Republic of Venice and the Ottoman Empire

== See also ==
- Battle of the Dardanelles (disambiguation)
