= Action of 10 July 1651 =

1651 naval battle

- Part of the Cretan War (1645–1669)
Date	10 July 1651
Location	Aegean Sea, off Patmos and Naxos, Cyclades archipelago
Result	Venetian victory

Belligerents
Republic of Venice	Ottoman Empire

Commanders and leaders
Alvise I Mocenigo	Hüsambeyzade Ali Pasha

Strength
28 sailing ships 24 galleys 6 galleasses	55 sailing ships 53 galleys 6 maonas (galleasses)

Casualties and losses
Unknown	5 sailing ships destroyed 10 sailing ships captured 1 maona captured 965 prisoners

This battle was fought on 10 July 1651, with some minor fighting on 8 July, between the islands of Paros and Naxos in the Aegean Sea, between the Venetian and Ottoman fleets. It was a Venetian victory, but failed to achieve anything decisive.

== Background ==
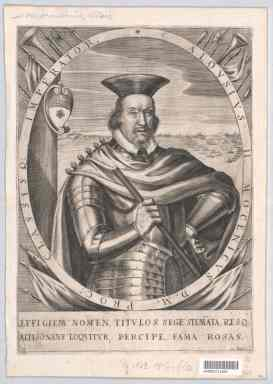
Engraving of the Venetian admiral, Alvise Mocenigo

The Venetian fleet, under the Captain General of the Sea Alvise Mocenigo, sailed from Cerigo to Euboea at the end of June 1651. It consisted of twenty eight sailing ships (under the Capitano delle Navi Luca Francesco Barbaro, with Dolfin and Girolamo Battaglia as his deputies), six galleasses (under the Capitano delle Galleazze and future Doge of Venice, Francesco Morosini) and twenty four galleys (Mocenigo, with the Provveditore all'Armata Molin as second in command). The Ottoman fleet, under the Kapudan Pasha, Hosambegzade Ali Pasha, sailed from the Dardanelles on 21 June, numbering 55 sailing ships, 53 galleys, and 6 mahones (galleasses). The Ottomans sailed for Chios and thence, on 29 June, for Patmos. Mocenigo was informed of this on 2 July and sailed south to Santorini, hoping to intercept it before it reached Crete. The Venetian fleet arrived at Santorini on 5 July, and on 7 July the Ottoman fleet appeared from the east, sailing to the south of the island, but it turned north when it spotted some Venetian stragglers. Mocenigo tried to support them, but darkness prevented any action from happening that day.

== Battle ==
On 8 July, the Venetians were somewhat scattered. Most of the sailing ships especially lagged behind, and Mocenigo tried to maintain contact with them. Only five sailing ships of the vanguard, under Battaglia, sailed close to the Turks, who opened fire on the small Venetian squadron. Battaglia fought unsupported until Barbaro with six sailing ships arrived to engage the Ottoman galleys. Mocenigo offered battle but the Ottoman fleet retired north, towing some of their sailing ships, toward the channel between Naxos and Paros.

On 9 July, the Venetians were more scattered, with only Battaglia's ship supporting their galleys, and Mocenigo had to rally to join them with the rest of the sailing ships after dawn. The Turks were to the north, steering between Paros and Naxos.

On 10 July, two galleasses, under the brothers Tommaso and Lazzaro Mocenigo, broke formation from the Venetian left and attacked some Ottoman galleys which were still watering at Paros. They ended up fighting the Kapudan Pasha himself, with six galleasses and some galleys. Tommaso was killed and Lazzaro wounded. Francesco Morosini arrived with the rest of the left wing, and later the Venetian right and center joined and broke the Ottoman formation, which had been disrupted by the Kapudan Pasha's attack on the Mocenigo brothers. The Ottoman galleys fled, leaving their sailing ships unsupported. These fled north or east of Naxos, but they were overtaken by the Venetian galleys and galleasses, which could rely on their rows to move; the Ottoman ships were captured, forced to beach, or burnt. The Ottoman fleet lost ten or eleven ships and one galleass captured, and five ships burnt, as well as 965 prisoners taken by the Venetians. Afterward, Mocenigo sailed to Candia, and the Turks to Rhodes.

== Aftermath ==
Reinforced with four Papal and four Hospitaller galleys, Mocenigo returned to the waters around Santorini in mid-August, hoping to intercept any Ottoman attempt to reach Chania. In this he failed, as Ali Pasha led 40 galleys from Rhodes to Chania in the last week of August. Mocenigo hastily sailed back to Crete, but when he arrived before Chania on 2 September, half the Ottoman fleet had already left for Rhodes. Mocenigo was forced to return to Candia on the 10th, being relieved shortly after by Leonardo Foscolo.

== Ships involved ==
=== Venice ===
- 28 sailing ships
  - Leoncorno Bianco
  - Giovanni Battista
  - Aquila Negra
  - Giovanni Battista
  - Arma di Venezia
  - Profeta Daniel
  - San Giobbe
  - San Zorzi (Giorgio)
  - Maria Elizabeta
  - Principe piccolo
  - Margarita
  - San Pietro
  - San Zorzi
  - Madonna della Vigna
  - Aquila d'Oro
  - Dragon
  - Sacrificio d'Abram
  - Difesa
  - Rotta Fortuna
  - Croce d'Oro
  - Damian
  - Tomaso Francesco
  - Fregata Grimani
  - San Marco grande
  - San Marco piccolo
  - Beneditione
  - Profeta Samuel
- 6 galleasses
- 24 galleys
- 2 fireships

=== Ottomans ===
- 55 sailing ships
- 6 galleasses
- 53 galleys

== Sources ==
- Anderson, R. C. (1952). Naval Wars in the Levant 1559–1853. Princeton: Princeton University Press.
- Setton, Kenneth Meyer (1991). Venice, Austria, and the Turks in the Seventeenth Century. Philadelphia: The American Philosophical Society. ISBN 0-87169-192-2.
