= Fortifications of Chania =

Defensive fortifications in Crete, Greece

- Chania, Crete, Greece
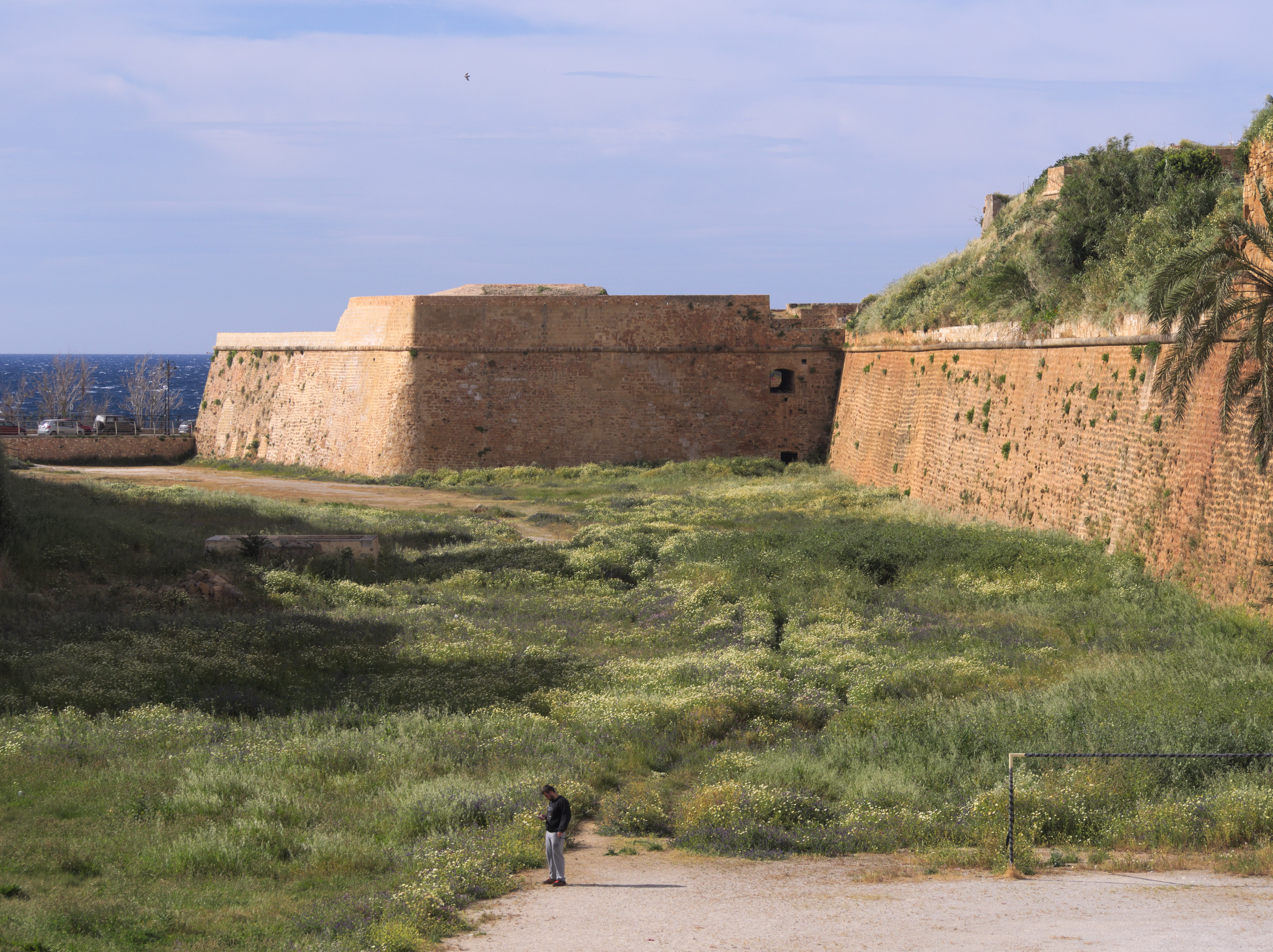
- San Salvatore Bastion

Site information
- Type: City wall
- Condition: Partially intact

Location
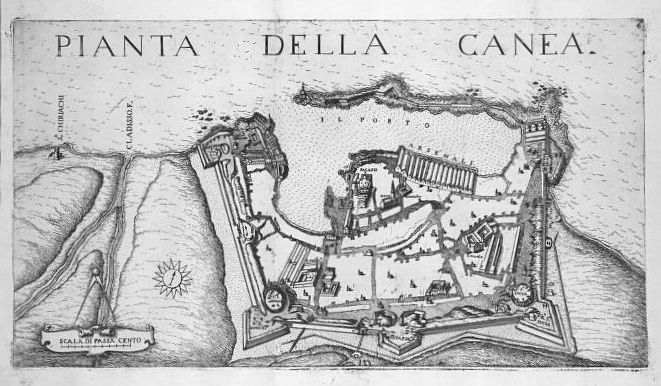
- Map of Chania and its fortifications in 1651
- Coordinates: 35°30′51″N 24°0′57.8″E
- Height: up to 20 m (66 ft)

Site history
- Built: 7th century BC (Hellenistic walls); 6th–10th centuries (Byzantine walls); 1336–c.1356 (first Venetian walls); 1536–1620 (second Venetian walls)
- Built by: Byzantine Empire; Republic of Venice
- Battles/wars: Cretan War (1645–69)

The fortifications of Chania are a series of defensive walls and other fortifications which surround the city of Chania in Crete, Greece. The inner city walls were first built in antiquity, and were rebuilt by the Byzantine Empire. The outer walls were built in the 16th century by the Republic of Venice. Some of the fortifications were demolished in the 20th century, but parts of both the Byzantine and Venetian walls remain intact.

== History ==
=== Hellenistic and Byzantine walls ===
In antiquity, a settlement known as Cydonia existed on the site of modern Chania. By the Hellenistic period, in around the 3rd century BC, the Cydonia was surrounded by walls. These were reinforced by the Byzantine Empire in the 6th and 7th centuries AD, before the city was destroyed by Saracens in 828.

Eventually, the Byzantines retook the city, and built a new fortress on the hill of Kastelli in the 10th century, to prevent a second Arab invasion. Some parts of the Byzantine wall still exist in Sifaka Street.

=== Venetian walls ===
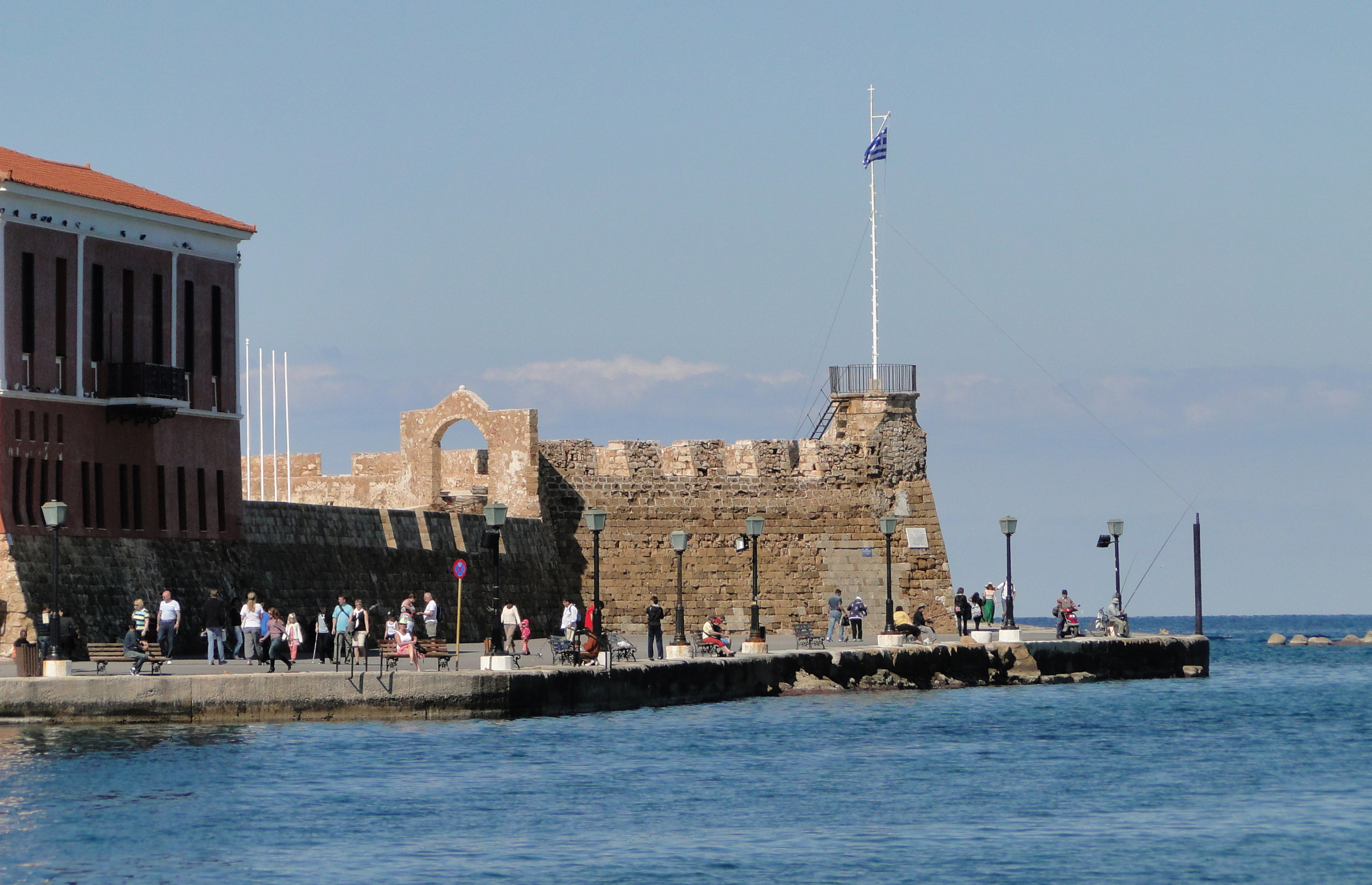
Firkas Fortress

Crete was occupied by the Republic of Venice in the 13th century. Initially they settled within the Byzantine walls on the hill of Kastelli, but the settlement eventually grew and a number of burgs developed outside the city walls. In 1336, it was decided that walls were to be built around the burgs, and the fortifications were completed within 20 years. The walls were modified over time and their height was increased.

By the early 16th century, the expanding Ottoman Empire became a major threat for the Venetians, and they decided to build new fortifications in Chania, as well as Heraklion and Rethymno. Work on the new fortifications began in 1536, to a design of Michele Sanmicheli. They were completed in 1568. Construction of the fortifications of Chania as well as a fortress on Thodorou cost a total of 87,000 ducats.

In 1620, the Firkas Fortress was built to protect Chania's harbour. In 1630, the city was armed with 319 cannons, 30,695 cannonballs and 413.274 lbs of gunpowder.

=== Ottoman rule to present day ===
The fifth Ottoman–Venetian War broke out when the Ottoman Navy arrived off Crete on 23 June 1645. The Ottomans first landed 15 miles west of Chania, and the local militia fled before them. They besieged the city for 56 days, and it fell on 22 August after the walls on the southwestern part of the city were breached. After the siege, the Ottomans restored the breached walls, and later modernized and renovated them. Chania remained under Ottoman control until November 1898.

Parts of the walls on the south side were demolished by the Cretan State in the early 20th century, since they limited the growth of the city. The union of the Creten State with Greece was celebrated at Firkas Fortress on 1 December 1913.

== Layout ==
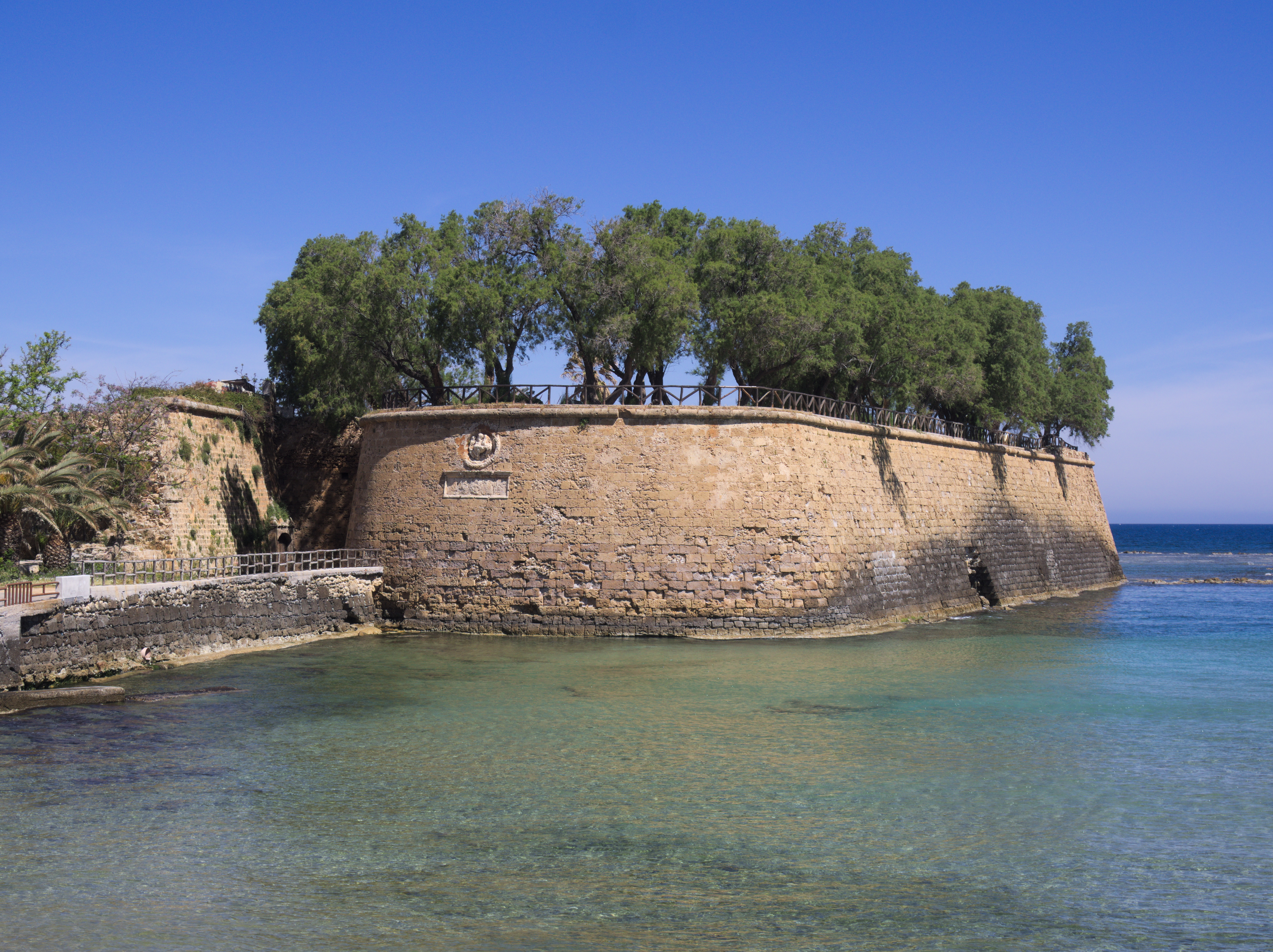
Mocenigo Bastion

The fortifications of Chania were roughly square in shape, and the corners were reinforced by the following bastions:

- San Salvatore Bastion (also known as Gritti Bastion), on the northwest corner
- San Dimitrio Bastion (also known as Schiavo Bastion or Lado Bastion), on the southwest corner
- Santa Lucia Bastion, on the southeast corner
- Mocenigo Bastion (also known as Sabbionara Bastion), on the northeast corner

The Firkas Fortress is located close to San Salvatore Bastion.

There were also three main gates:

- Porta San Salvatore, on the west side
- Porta Retimiota, on the south side
- Porta Sabbionara, on the east side

The walls were up to 20 m (66 ft) high, and were surrounded by a ditch which was 60 m (200 ft) wide and 15 m (49 ft) deep.
