= Cretan War (1645–1669) =

Conflict between the Republic of Venice and the Ottoman Empire (1645–1669)

Cretan War (fifth Ottoman–Venetian war)
- Part of the Ottoman–Venetian wars
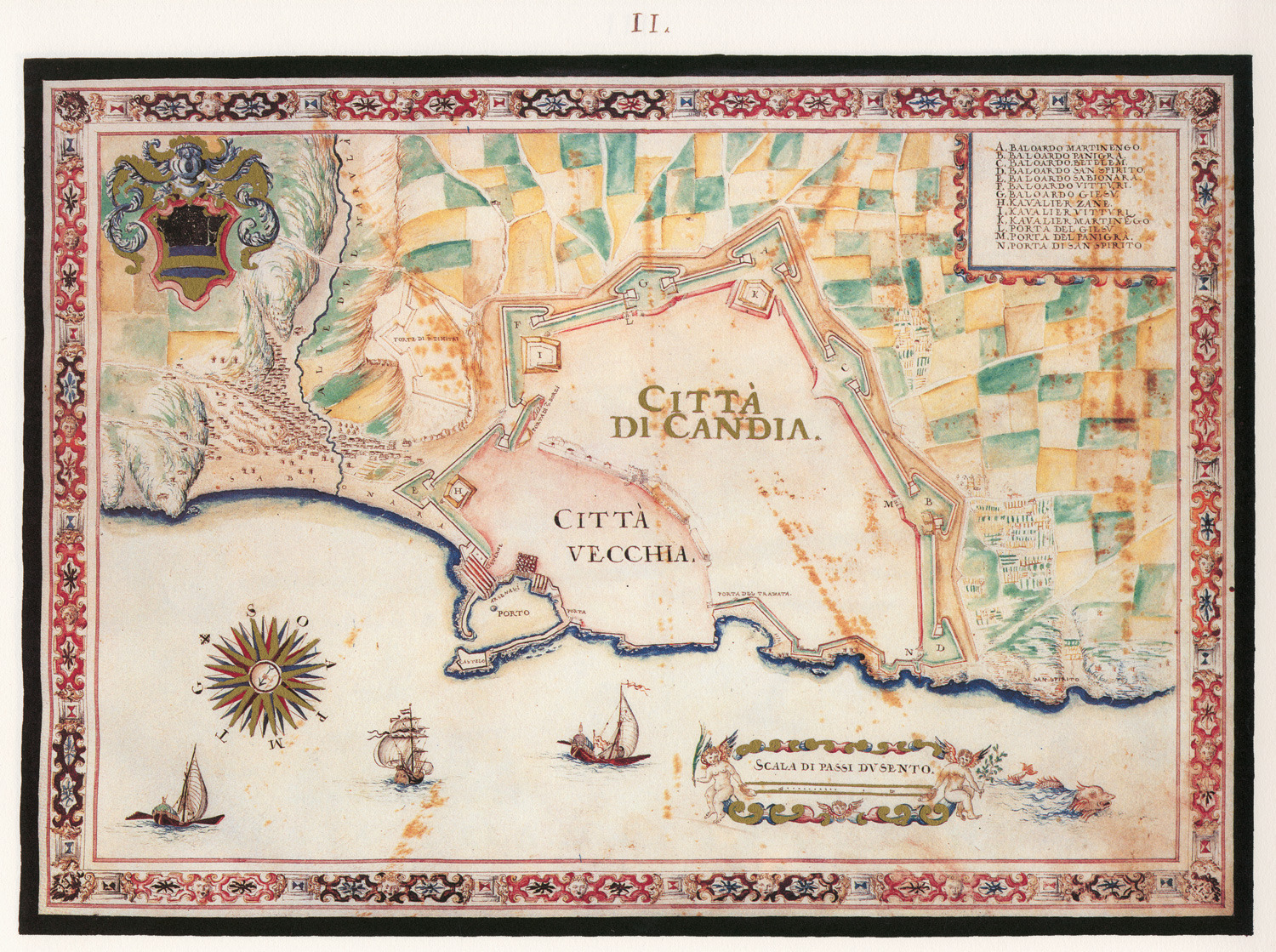
- A Venetian map of Candia
Date	1645–1669
Location	Candia, Crete, Dalmatia and Aegean Sea
Result	Ottoman victory
Territorial changes	Crete conquered by the Ottoman Empire; Venetian gains in Dalmatia

Belligerents
Ottoman Empire; Ottoman Tripolitania; (Beylik of Tunis) Ottoman Tunis; Regency of Algiers	Republic of Venice; Knights of Malta; Papal States; France; Greek revolutionaries (including Maniots); Albanian Christian rebels

Commanders and leaders
(Ottoman Empire) Ibrahim (executed); (Ottoman Empire) Kösem Sultan (executed); (Ottoman Empire) Mehmed IV; (Ottoman Empire) Turhan Sultan; (Ottoman Empire) Silahdar Yusuf Pasha; (Ottoman Empire) Koca Musa Pasha †; (Ottoman Empire) Gazi Hüseyin Pasha; (Ottoman Empire) Voinok Ahmed Pasha; (Ottoman Empire) Kara Murad Pasha; (Ottoman Empire) Köprülü Pasha; (Ottoman Empire) Köprülüzade Pasha	Andrea Corner; Niccolò Ludovisi; Tommaso Morosini †; Giovanni B. Grimani; Giacomo da Riva; Alvise Mocenigo; Leonardo Foscolo; C. M. von Degenfeld; Stojan Janković; Lorenzo Marcello †; Lazzaro Mocenigo †; Francesco Morosini; Almerigo d'Este; Duke of Beaufort †; Antonio Crutta

Casualties and losses
118,754 Ottoman dead (Venetian reports)	30,985 Venetian dead (Venetian reports)
- Losses in Candia only, according to Venetian reports, excluding those on the Dalmatian front, at sea, and the initial operations in Crete. If included, the total number of casualties would possibly be twice as high.

The Cretan War (Note: Greek: Κρητικός Πόλεμος, romanized: Kritikós Pólemos; Turkish: Girit'in Fethi), also known as the War of Candia (Note: Italian: Guerra di Candia) or the fifth Ottoman–Venetian war, was a conflict between the Republic of Venice and her allies (chief among them the Knights of Malta, the Papal States and France) against the Ottoman Empire and the Barbary States largely fought over the island of Crete, Venice's largest and richest overseas possession. The war lasted from 1645 to 1669 and was fought in Crete, especially in the city of Candia, and in numerous naval engagements and raids around the Aegean Sea, with Dalmatia providing a secondary theater of operations.

Although most of Crete was conquered by the Ottomans in the first few years of the war, the fortress of Candia (modern Heraklion), the capital of Crete, resisted successfully. Its prolonged siege, "Troy's rival" as Lord Byron called it, forced both sides to focus their attention on the supply of their respective forces on the island. For the Venetians in particular, their only hope for victory over the larger Ottoman army in Crete lay in successfully starving it of supplies and reinforcements. Hence the war turned into a series of naval encounters between the two navies and their allies. Venice was aided by various Western European nations, who, exhorted by the Pope and in a revival of crusading spirit, sent men, ships and supplies "to defend Christendom". Throughout the war, Venice maintained overall naval superiority, winning most naval engagements, but the efforts to blockade the Dardanelles were only partially successful, and the Republic never had enough ships to fully cut off the flow of supplies and reinforcements to Crete. The Ottomans were hampered in their efforts by domestic turmoil, as well as by the diversion of their forces north towards Transylvania and the Habsburg monarchy.

The prolonged conflict exhausted the economy of the Republic, which relied on the lucrative trade with the Ottoman Empire. By the 1660s, despite increased aid from other Christian nations, war-weariness had set in. The Ottomans on the other hand, having managed to sustain their forces on Crete and reinvigorated under the capable leadership of the Köprülü family, sent a final great expedition in 1666 under the direct supervision of the Grand Vizier. This began the final and bloodiest stage of the Siege of Candia, which lasted for more than two years. It ended with the negotiated surrender of the fortress, sealing the fate of the island and ending the war in an Ottoman victory. In the final peace treaty, Venice retained a few isolated island fortresses off Crete, and made some territorial gains in Dalmatia. The Venetian desire for a revanche would lead, barely 15 years later, to a renewed war, from which Venice would emerge victorious. Crete, however, would remain under Ottoman control until 1897, when it became an autonomous state; it was finally united with Greece in 1913.

== Background ==
After the loss of Cyprus to the Ottomans in the fourth Ottoman–Venetian War (1570–1573), the island of Crete (the "Kingdom of Candia") was the last major overseas possession of Venice. Its important strategic position made it an obvious target for future Ottoman expansion, while its size and fertile ground, together with the bad state of its fortresses, made it a more tempting prize than Malta. On the Venetian side, the Serenissima, with its weak military and great dependence on uninterrupted trade, was anxious not to provoke the Ottomans. Hence Venice scrupulously observed the terms of its treaty with the Ottomans, securing over sixty years of peaceful relations. By the early 17th century moreover, Venetian power had declined considerably. Its economy, which had once prospered because of its control over the Eastern spice trade, had suffered as a result of the opening of the new Atlantic trade routes, and from the loss of the important German market because of the Thirty Years' War. In addition, the Republic had become embroiled in a series of wars in northern Italy like the Mantuan War and was further weakened by an outbreak of the plague in 1629–1631.

The potential for conflict between the Ottomans and Venice was still present, as evidenced in 1638, when a Venetian fleet attacked and destroyed a fleet of Barbary pirates that had sought protection in the Ottoman port of Valona, bombarding the city in the process. Sultan Murad IV was enraged: he threatened to execute all Venetians in the Empire, and put an embargo on Venetian trade. Eventually, and given that the Ottomans were still engaged in a war with the Persians, the situation was defused with the Republic paying the Ottomans an indemnity of 250,000 sequins.

A similar episode however in 1644 had an entirely different outcome: on 28 September, the Knights of Malta attacked an Ottoman convoy of sailing ships on its way from Constantinople to Alexandria, aboard which were a number of pilgrims bound for Mecca, including the exiled Kızlar Ağa (Chief Black Eunuch) Sünbül Ağa, the kadi of Cairo and the nurse of the future sultan Mehmed IV. During the fight, Sünbül Ağa and most of the important pilgrims were slain, while 350 men and 30 women were taken to be sold as slaves. The Knights loaded their loot on a ship, which then docked at a small harbor on the southern coast of Crete for a few days, where it disembarked a number of sailors and slaves. The Ottomans were enraged at the incident, and the Porte accused the Venetians of deliberate collusion with the Knights, something the Venetians vehemently denied. With the hawkish party being then dominant in the Ottoman court, the incident was seen as a perfect pretext for war with a weakened Venice. Despite a long period of negotiations, which lasted until well into 1645, and against the objections of the Grand Vizier Sultanzade Mehmed Pasha, war was decided upon. An expedition was quickly assembled with over 50,000 troops and reputedly 416 vessels, under Kapudan Pasha Silahdar Yusuf Pasha, the Sultan's son-in-law. The Ottoman armada sailed from the Dardanelles on 30 April, heading towards the harbor of Navarino in the Peloponnese, where it remained for three weeks. The fleet's target was not announced, but the Ottomans, to allay Venetian fears, implied that it would be Malta.

== War ==
=== Early operations ===
The Venetians were indeed fooled by the Ottoman subterfuge and were taken by surprise at the arrival of the Ottoman fleet at Crete on 23 June 1645. Despite the efforts of the recently appointed provveditore generale, Andrea Corner, the Venetian defenses were still in a bad state. The island's fortifications were substantial, but they had been long neglected, and much effort was put into repairing them. Anxious about Ottoman preparations, the Republic reinforced Crete in late 1644 with 2,500 troops and provisions, and began arming its fleet, while assistance was promised in the event of war by the Pope and Tuscany.

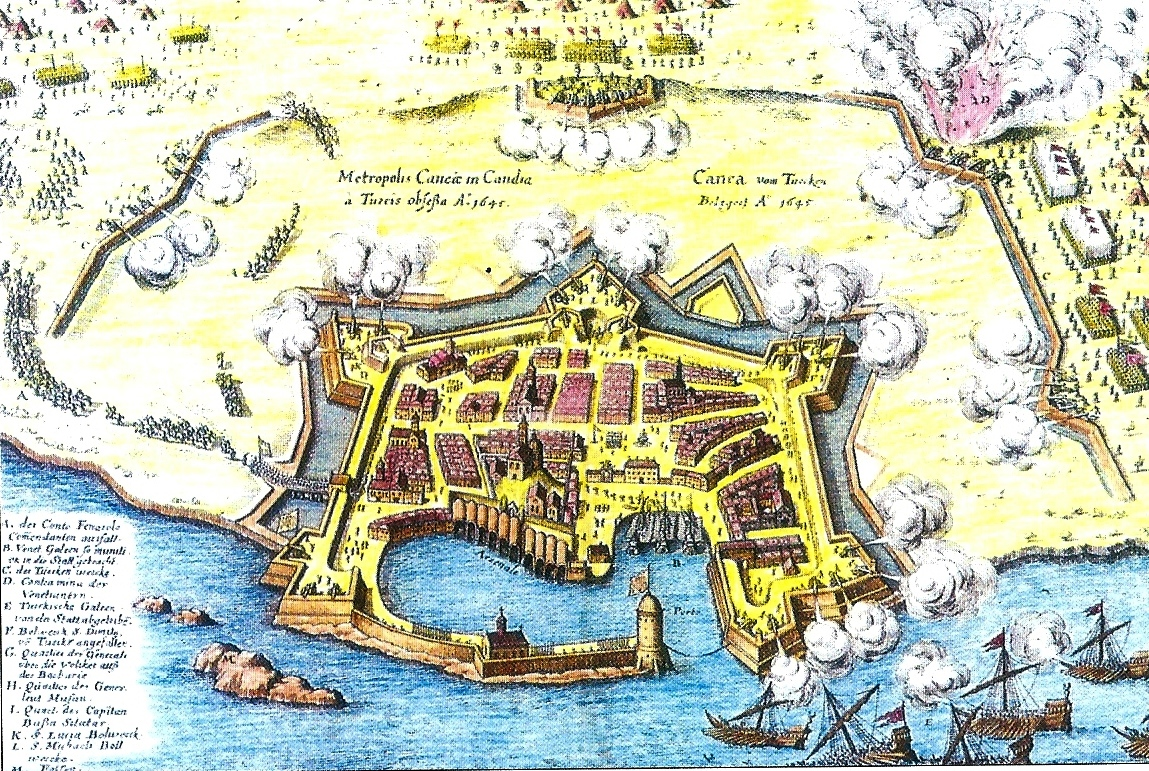
Siege of Chania in 1645. After the siege, the Ottomans restored the fortifications of Chania.

The Ottomans first landed 15 miles west of Canea (Chania), where the local militia fled before them. They then attacked the small island fortress of St. Todero, the commander of which, the Istrian Blasio Zulian, blew himself, the fortress and its garrison up rather than let it fall to the Ottomans. The Ottoman army next advanced to the city of Canea itself, which fell on 22 August, after a siege that lasted for 56 days. At the same time, however, the Venetians were strengthened, as the promised help started to arrive in the form of galleys from the Papal States, Tuscany, Malta and Naples. In September, the Ottoman fleet was in disarray, but the allied Christian fleet, under the cautious command of Niccolò Ludovisi, the Pope's nephew, failed to exploit the opportunity for a decisive strike. When the Christian forces finally moved to retake Canea on 1 October, with a fleet of about 90 ships, the stout Ottoman defense and the Allies' lack of cooperation doomed the attack. Soon thereafter, the Venetian allies returned to their bases.

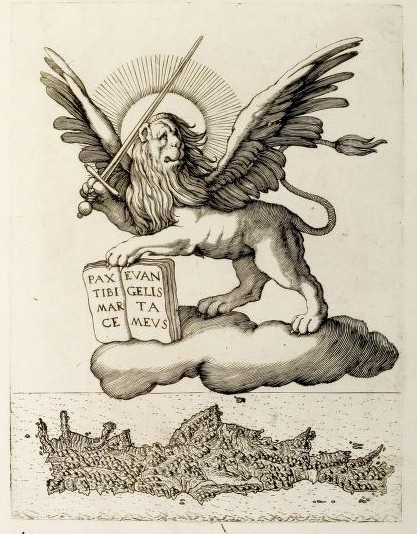
1651 map by Francesco Basilicata depicting the Venetian Lion of St. Mark standing guard over the Regno di Candia. By that time however, all of the island, except for the capital Candia, was under Ottoman control.

In November, Silahdar Yusuf Pasha left behind a strong garrison and returned to Constantinople for the winter. There however, he fell foul of the Sultan and was executed. Nevertheless, Ottoman preparations continued in order to renew and expand the war, while the Venetians were frantically trying to raise money and men, and attempting to induce other European powers to join them against the Ottomans. However, as most of Europe was locked into the fierce antagonisms of the Thirty Years' War, their pleas fell mostly on deaf ears. The Venetians were hard pressed by the financial demands of the war: besides placing taxes on the Italian mainland possessions (the Terraferma), they resorted to the sale of nobility titles and state offices to fill their war coffer. To lead the effort against the Ottomans, the Senate initially appointed the 80-year-old doge Francesco Erizzo, but after his death in early 1646, he was replaced by the 73-year-old Giovanni Cappello as Captain General of the Sea.

Cappello's performance in 1646 was distinctly lackluster: he failed to interdict the arrival of Ottoman reinforcements under Koca Musa Pasha in June (see below), and an attack on the Ottoman fleet at Chania Bay in August failed, as did his attempt to break the Ottoman blockade of Rettimo (Rethymno). As a result, the city fell on 20 October, while the citadel held out until 13 November. During the winter of 1646–1647, both sides suffered from an outbreak of plague, and throughout the spring of 1647, operations did not make much headway. In mid-June however, a small Ottoman force routed a larger body of Venetian mercenaries. This Ottoman success paved the way for Gazi Hüseyin Pasha, the local commander, to conquer the eastern half of the island, except for the fortress of Siteia. The Venetians and the local population suffered some grievous losses: it is estimated that by 1648, almost 40% of the Cretan population had perished of disease or warfare, and in 1677, the island's pre-war population of ca. 260,000 had dropped to about 80,000. By the beginning of 1648, all of Crete, except Candia and a few strongholds like the island of Gramvousa, was in Ottoman hands.

=== Siege of Candia begins ===
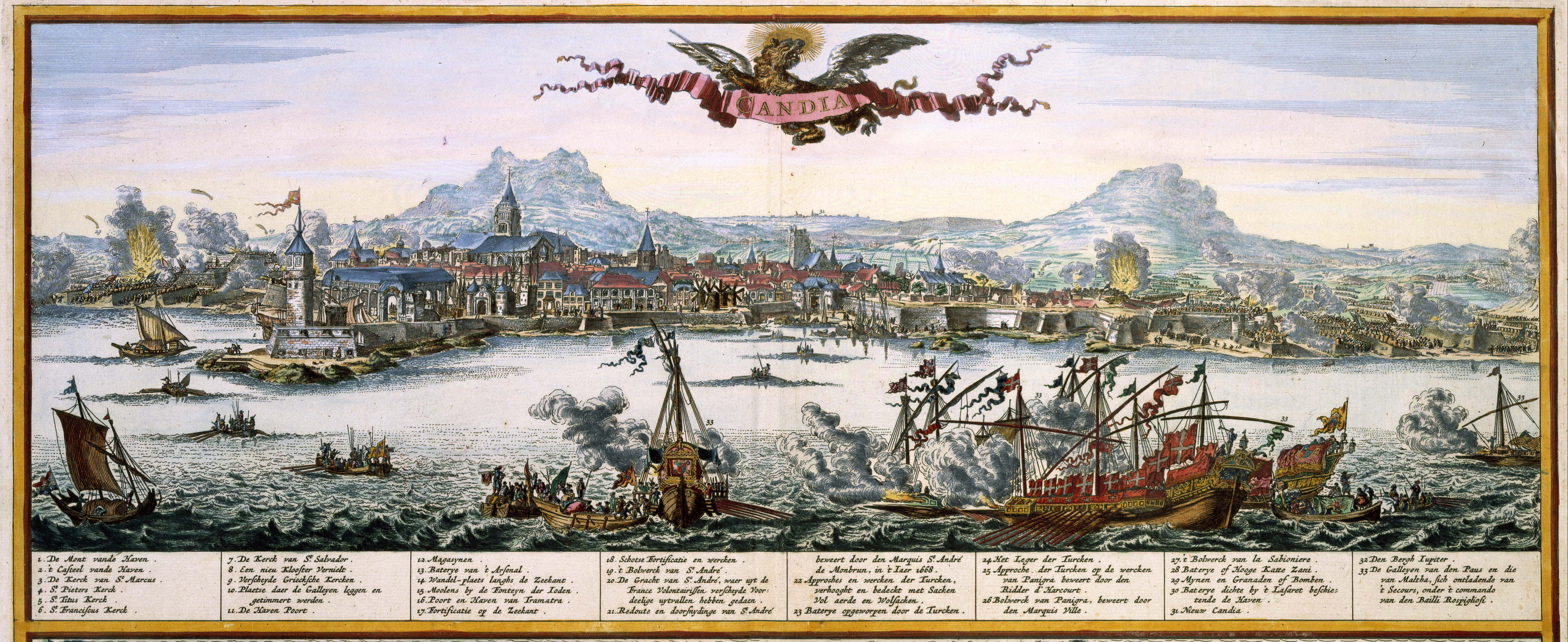
The siege of Candia, c. 1680

The siege began in May 1648. The Ottomans spent three months investing the city, which included cutting off the water supply. Eventually, it would last until 1669, the second longest siege in history after the Siege of Ceuta (1694-1727) by the Moors under Moulay Ismail. The Ottoman besiegers were adversely affected by the bad supply situation caused by the activity of the Christian fleets in the Aegean, who intercepted Ottoman convoys carrying supplies and reinforcements to the island. In addition, the overall Ottoman war effort was severely hampered by increased domestic instability caused by Sultan Ibrahim's erratic policies and his summary execution of leading state officials. It ultimately led to his deposition in favor of his son Mehmed IV, ushering in a further period of confusion within the Ottoman government.

The lack of supplies had forced the Ottoman commander Gazi Hüseyin Pasha to lift the siege in early 1649, but it was renewed for a short period of two months after the arrival of the Ottoman fleet in June. The Ottomans assailed the fortifications, exploding over 70 mines, but the defenders held firm. The Ottomans lost over 1,000 men, and the subsequent withdrawal of 1,500 Janissaries and the lack of any further reinforcements over the course of 1650 left Hüseyin Pasha with little option but to continue maintaining as tight a blockade as possible. The Ottomans strengthened their positions with the construction of three forts in the Canea area, and the arrival of reinforcements in late 1650 allowed them to keep up their tight blockade. Despite the Venetian blockade of the Dardanelles and the political turmoil at the Ottoman court, the Ottoman forces were kept well supplied enough to sustain themselves, although too weak to engage in offensive actions against Candia itself. In 1653, the Ottomans took the island fortress of Selino in Suda Bay, and San Todero, captured a few years previously, was refortified. The Venetian naval successes over the next few years further reduced the offensive ability of the Ottoman army in Crete, but the blockade of Candia continued, and the Ottomans retained possession of their other conquests on the island, until the arrival of a new Ottoman expeditionary force in 1666.

=== Naval war ===
==== Early clashes, 1645–1654 ====
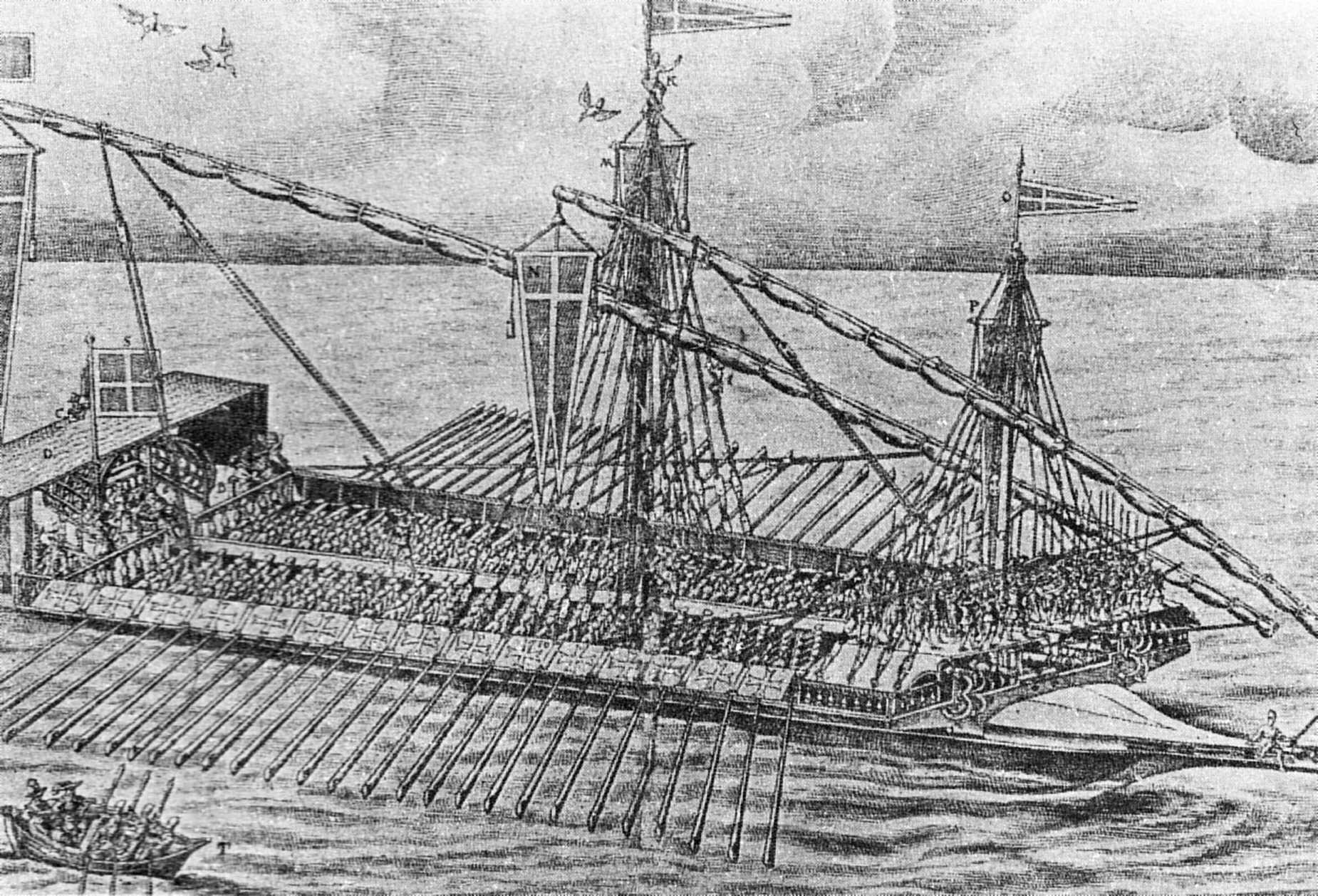
A Maltese galley. Although being gradually replaced by sailing ships, galleys formed still a large part of the Mediterranean navies during the 17th century.

Venice could not directly confront the large Ottoman expeditionary force on Crete, but it did possess a fine navy, that could intervene and cut the Ottoman supply routes. In 1645, the Venetians and their allies possessed a fleet of 60–70 galleys, 4 galleasses and about 36 galleons. The Venetians were also superior in their use of a mixed fleet of both galleys and sailing ships, while initially, the Ottoman navy relied almost exclusively on galleys. In order to bolster their forces, both opponents hired armed merchantmen from the Netherlands, and later from England (especially the Ottomans), to augment their forces.

The first Venetian operation was an attempt to blockade the Dardanelles in 1646. To interdict the supplies headed to the Ottoman forces in Crete, a force of 23 Venetian ships under Tommaso Morosini scoured the Aegean for Ottoman shipping, and attempted to capture the strategically important island of Tenedos at the entrance of the Dardanelles. The Kapudan Pasha Koca Musa led a fleet of 80 warships against the Venetians, but his fleet was driven back into the Dardanelles on 26 May. However, the blockading fleet was unable to stop the next exit of the Ottoman fleet on 4 June, when the lack of wind enabled the Ottoman galleys to evade the Venetian sailing ships. The Ottomans were thus able to land new troops and supplies on Crete unopposed. The efforts of the Venetian fleet to counter the Ottoman land operations in Crete likewise failed, through a combination of timidity on behalf of their commanders, the delays in payment for the crews, and the effects of a widespread plague.

On 27 January 1647, the Venetians lost Tommaso Morosini, when his ship was forced to face the entire Ottoman fleet of 45 galleys. In the ensuing fight, Morosini was killed, but managed to cause significant casualties to the Ottomans, including Koca Musa Pasha himself. The ship itself was rescued by the timely arrival of the Venetian fleet under the new Captain General, Giovanni Battista Grimani. This stand-off, where a single ship had caused such damage and casualties to the entire Ottoman fleet, was a major blow to Ottoman morale. Despite some successes like a raid in Çeşme, the remainder of the year was a failure for the Venetians, as several attempts to blockade Ottoman harbors failed to stem the flow of supplies and reinforcements to Crete.

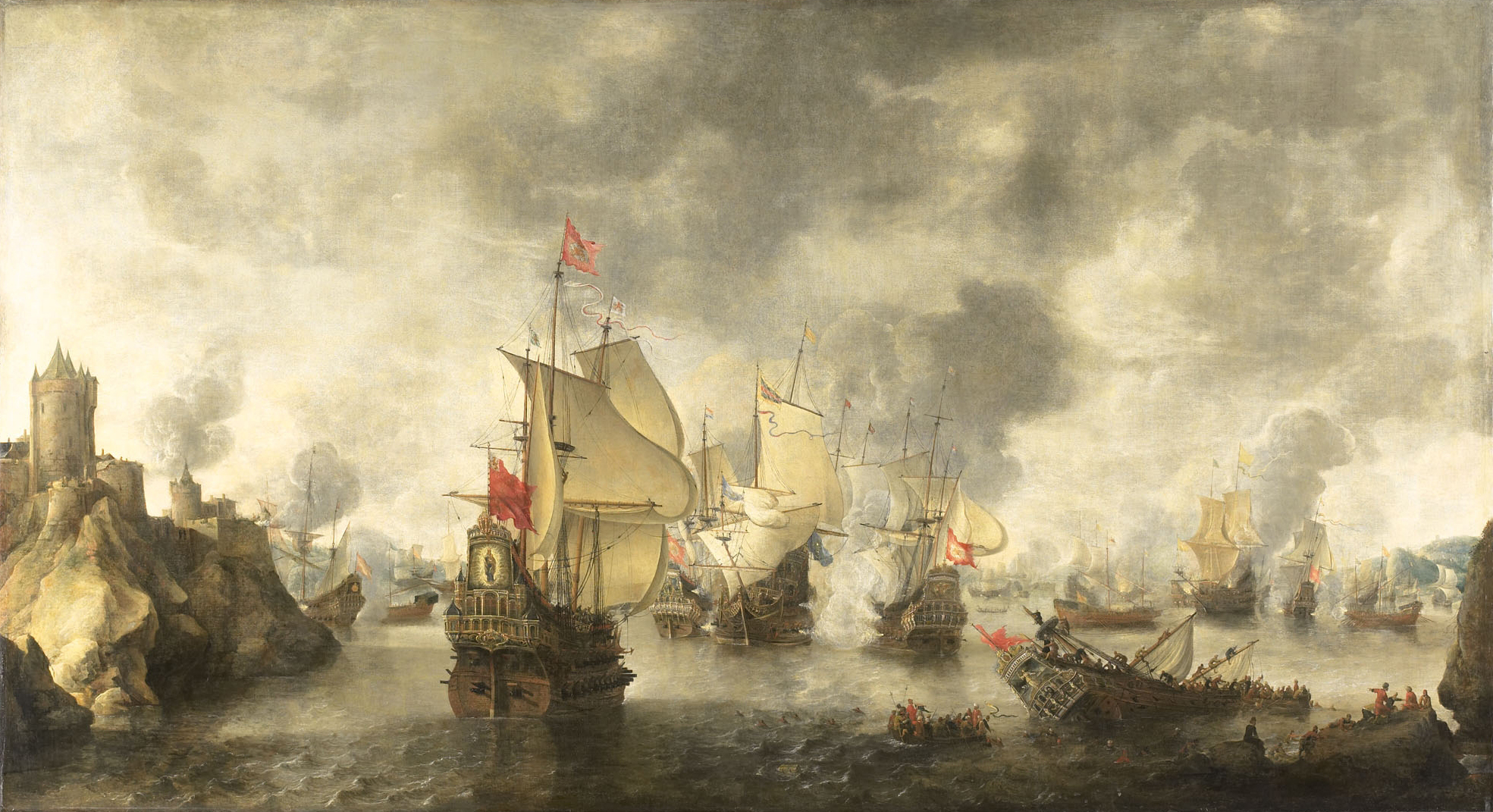
Battle of the Venetian fleet against the Turks at Phocaea (Focchies) in 1649. Painting by Abraham Beerstraten, 1656.

The Venetians returned to the Dardanelles in 1648. Despite losing many ships and admiral Grimani himself in a storm in mid-March, reinforcements under Giacomo da Riva brought the Venetian fleet back up to strength (some 65 vessels), and allowed them to successfully blockade the Straits for a whole year. The Ottomans countered this in part by building a new fleet at Çeşme, forcing the Venetians to divide their forces, and in 1649, a strengthened Ottoman fleet under Kapudan Pasha Voinok Ahmed broke the blockade. Despite scoring a victory over the Ottoman fleet in its anchorage at Phocaea on 12 May 1649, capturing or destroying several ships, da Riva was not able to prevent the Ottoman armada from eventually reaching Crete. This highlighted the weakness of the Venetian position: maintaining long blockades with galleys was an inherently difficult task, and the Republic did not have enough ships to control both the Dardanelles and the passage of Chios at the same time. In addition, in a major development, 1648 the Ottomans decided, in a meeting chaired by the Sultan himself, to build and employ galleons in their fleet, instead of relying exclusively on oared galleys as hitherto.

For most of 1650, a Venetian fleet of 41 vessels maintained the blockade of the Dardanelles, prohibiting Haideragazade Mehmed Pasha from sailing for Crete. He was replaced late in the year by Hozamzade Ali Pasha, governor of Rhodes, who used a clever ploy to get through the blockade: waiting until winter, when the Venetians withdrew their forces, he assembled a small number of ships and embarked several thousand troops with many provisions on them, and sailed unmolested to Crete.

On 10 July 1651, the first significant naval battle of the war was fought south of Naxos, a three-day engagement in which the Venetians with 58 ships under Alvise Mocenigo were victorious over the twice as large Ottoman fleet. The remainders of the Ottoman fleet withdrew to Rhodes, from where they were however able to reach Candia. Mocenigo was replaced soon after by Leonardo Foscolo, but both sides did not accomplish much in the next two years, although the Ottomans did succeed in supplying their forces on Crete while keeping their fleet intact.

==== Dardanelles, 1654–1657 ====
Map of the Dardanelles and vicinity

For 1654, the Ottomans marshaled their strength: the Arsenal (Tersâne-i Âmire) in the Golden Horn produced new warships, and squadrons from Tripolitania and Tunis arrived to strengthen the Ottoman fleet. The strengthened Ottoman fleet that sailed forth from the Dardanelles in early May numbered 79 ships (40 sailing ships, 33 galleys and 6 galleasses), and further 22 galleys from around the Aegean and 14 ships from Barbary stood by to reinforce it off the Straits. This force considerably outnumbered the 26 ships of the Venetian blockade fleet under Giuseppe Dolfin. Although the battle that followed resulted in an Ottoman victory, for the Venetians, given the successful escape of their fleet from the superior Ottoman force, coupled with reports of large Ottomans casualties and the great bravery displayed by the Venetian crews, it counted as a moral victory. The Ottoman fleet, now reinforced by the Aegean and Barbary squadrons, plundered the Venetian island of Tinos, but retreated after only a brief skirmish with the Venetians under Alvise Mocenigo on 21 June. Kara Murad Pasha succeeded in evading the Venetians for the remainder of the year, with both fleets sailing back and forth in the Aegean, before returning to the Dardanelles in September due to agitation among the fleet's Janissaries. The final months of 1654 were marked by a significant change in the Venetian leadership: Mocenigo died at Candia, and was succeeded as acting Captain General of the Sea by Francesco Morosini, who had distinguished himself in the previous battles.

Morosini initiated a more energetic approach in the Venetian pursuit of the war: in the spring of 1655, he raided the Ottoman supply depot at Aigina and razed the port town of Volos in a night attack on 23 March. In early June, Morosini sailed to the Dardanelles, awaiting the sally of the Ottoman fleet, which was however delayed because of political upheaval in the Ottoman government. Leaving Lazzaro Mocenigo with half the fleet (36 ships) to keep watch at the Straits, Morosini returned to the Cyclades. A week after his departure however, on 21 June, the Ottoman fleet, numbering 143 ships under Mustapha Pasha, appeared. The resulting battle was a clear Venetian victory. The Ottoman fleet avoided action for the remainder of the year, before it withdrew to winter quarters, leaving Morosini free to undertake an ultimately unsuccessful siege of the strategically important island fortress of Malvasia (Monemvasia) off the south-eastern coast of the Peloponnese. In September, Morosini was posted as the new provveditore of Crete, with Lorenzo Marcello as the new Captain General of the Sea.

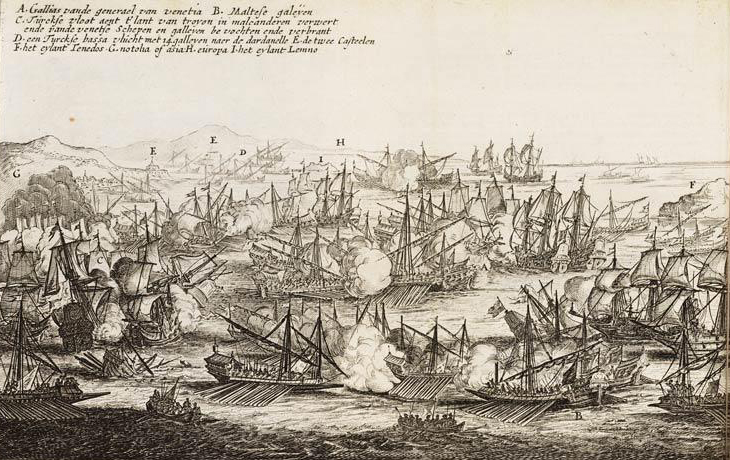
The Third Battle of the Dardanelles, by Pieter Casteleyn, 1657

Although in the previous years the Venetians had generally held the upper hand against the Ottomans, largely controlling the Aegean and able to extract tribute and recruits from its islands, they had been unable to transform this superiority into concrete results. Despite their defeats, the Ottomans were still free to roam the Aegean and resupply their forces in Crete, in particular through the use of supply fleets from places like Alexandria, Rhodes, Chios or Monemvasia in the Peloponnese. In June 1656 however, a combined Venetian–Maltese fleet of 67 ships under Marcello inflicted on the Ottomans, with 108 ships under Kenan Pasha, their "worst naval defeat since Lepanto": Sixty Ottoman ships were destroyed and 24 captured and 5,000 Christian galley slaves set free, although the Venetians and Maltese suffered some casualties too, including the loss of Captain General Marcello. Although in the aftermath of this victory the Maltese contingent departed, the scale of their success enabled the Venetians under Barbado Doer to seize Tenedos on 8 July and Lemnos on 20 August. Using the two islands, strategically located near the entrance of the Straits, as forward bases, the Venetian blockade became much more effective. As a result, the resupply of Crete was effectively cut off, and Constantinople itself suffered a shortage of food during the following winter.

In 1657, the Ottomans reversed the situation. A new and energetic Grand Vizier, Köprülü Mehmed Pasha, armed with almost dictatorial authority, had been appointed in September 1656, and reinvigorated the Ottoman war effort. The fleet was strengthened under the new Kapudan Pasha, Topal Mehmed, and in March, the Ottomans succeeded in evading the Venetian blockade of the Straits and sailed towards Tenedos. They did not attack the island however, because the Venetian garrison was too strong. In May, the Venetians under Lazzaro Mocenigo achieved some minor victories, on 3 May and two weeks later at Suazich. Reinforced by Papal and Maltese ships, Mocenigo sailed to the Dardanelles, awaiting the renewed sally of the Ottoman fleet, which came on 17 July. Due to disagreements among the Christian commanders, the allied battle line had not been completely formed, and the Ottoman fleet was able to exit the Narrows before battle was joined. The battle consisted of a series of actions over three days, with both fleets drifting south and west out of the Dardanelles into the Aegean. The battle ended in the evening of 19 July, when an explosion destroyed the Venetian flagship and killed Mocenigo, forcing the allied fleet to withdraw. In this battle, the Venetians had inflicted heavier casualties on the Ottomans than they had suffered, but the Ottomans had achieved their goal: the blockade was broken. Under the personal direction of the Grand Vizier and strengthened by men and ships from the Barbary states, the Ottoman fleet proceeded to recover Lemnos, on 31 August, and Tenedos, on 12 November, thus removing any hope the Venetians may have had of re-establishing the blockade as firmly as before.

==== Stalemate, 1658–1666 ====
In 1658, Ottoman power was redirected north in a campaign against George II Rákóczi, Prince of Transylvania, which evolved into a long conflict with the Habsburgs. For the next few years, the Venetian fleet, again under the command of Morosini, unsuccessfully attempted to maintain the blockade of the Straits of the Dardanelles. Morosini also resumed his tactic of attacking Ottoman strongholds: a siege of the island of Santa Maura (Lefkada) in August 1658 failed, but in 1659, the Venetians, aided by the Maniots, sacked Kalamata in the Peloponnese, followed by Torone in the Chalcidice, Karystos in Euboea, and Çeşme. However, since Venice could not spare forces to occupy these places, these raids gained the Republic nothing of substance. On the Ottoman side, Köprülü Mehmed ordered the construction of two new forts, Sedd el Bahr ("Rampart of the Sea") and Kilid Bahr ("Key of the Sea"), at the European shore of the entrance of the Dardanelles, to prohibit the Venetians from entering the Straits again.

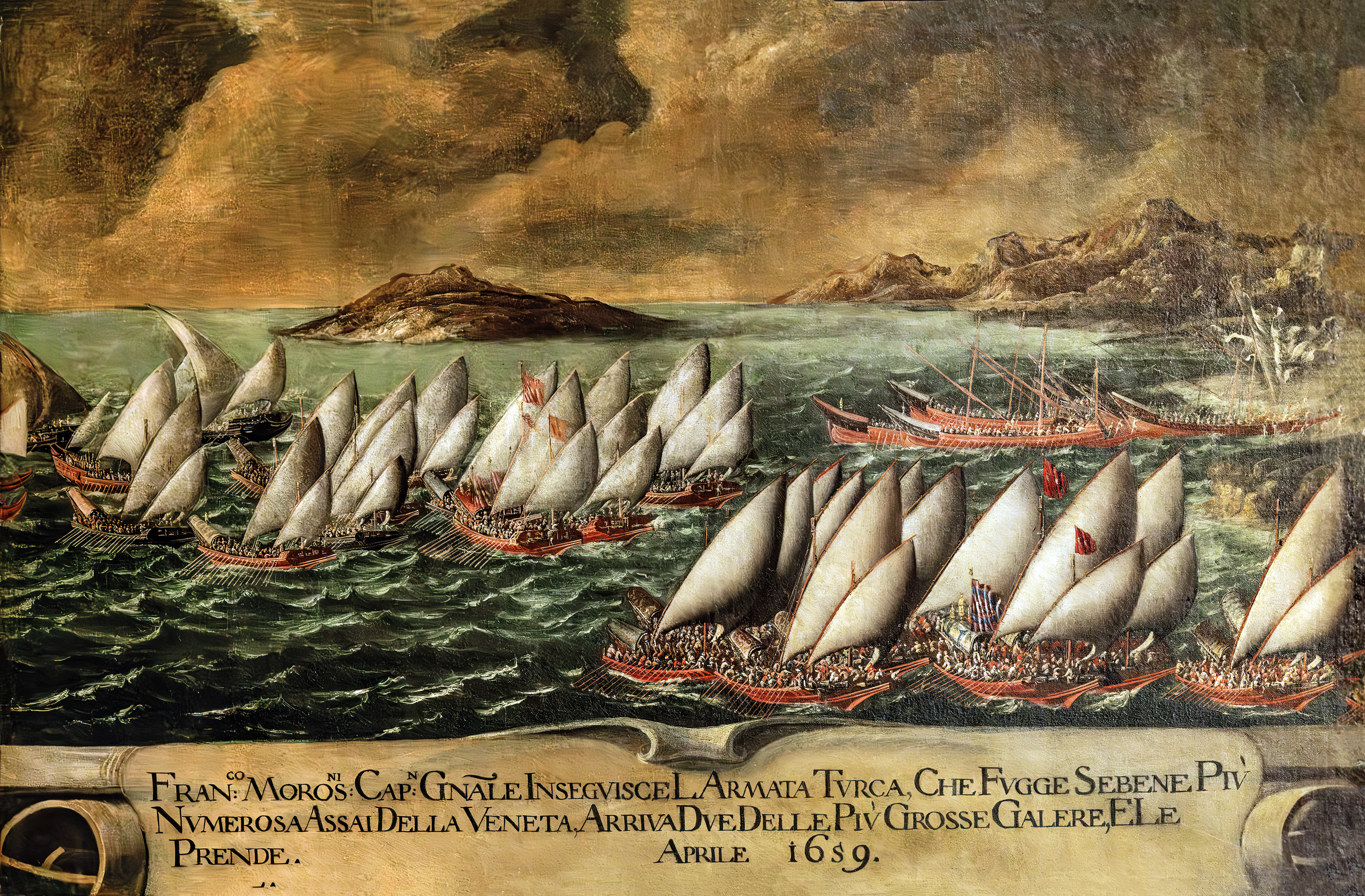
Naval battle between the Turks and the Venetians in 1659

In the meantime, war-weariness had set in among the Venetians, who suffered from the disruption in trade. Peace feelers were sent to the Ottomans, but their demand for the full concession of Crete as a condition for peace was unacceptable to the Republic. With the end of the war between France and Spain however, the Venetians became encouraged, hoping to receive increased assistance in money and men, especially from the French, whose traditionally good relations with the Porte had soured of late.

This support did indeed soon develop, when individuals or whole companies of men from across Western Europe volunteered for the Republic's army, while Christian rulers also felt obliged to provide men, supplies and ships. The first French contingent of 4,200 men under Prince Almerigo d'Este arrived in April 1660, along with further contingents of German mercenaries, troops from Savoy, and Maltese, Tuscan and French ships. Despite this increase in strength, Morosini's operations in 1660 were a failure: an assault on Canea in August succeeded in taking the outlying fortifications but failed to retake the city itself; similarly, an attack against the Ottoman siege lines at Candia in September achieved some success, but did not break the Ottoman siege. Following the death of Prince d'Este at Naxos shortly after, the French contingent returned home, followed soon after by a disheartened Morosini, who was succeeded by his kinsman Giorgio. In 1661, Giorgio Morosini scored a few minor successes: he broke an Ottoman blockade of Tinos, and, pursuing the Ottoman fleet, defeated it off Milos. The next few years however were relatively idle. Although the Ottomans were heavily engaged with the Austrians in Hungary, and that their fleet rarely sallied forth, the Venetians failed to make use of this opportunity, and, except for the intercept of a supply convoy from Alexandria off Kos in 1662, there was little action.

==== Final phase 1666–1669 ====
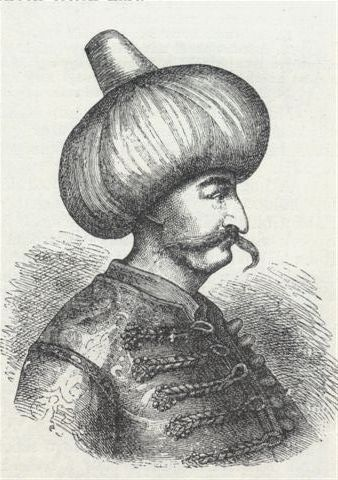
Grand Vizier Köprülü Fazıl Ahmed Pasha

If the Venetians were idle, the Ottomans were not: with the signing of the Peace of Vasvár in 1664, they were able to focus their strength against Crete. Grand Vizier Köprülü Fazıl Ahmed initiated large preparations in the winter of 1665/66, and dispatched 9,000 men to bolster the Ottoman forces in Crete. An Ottoman peace proposal, which would have allowed Venice to keep Candia against an annual payment of tribute was rejected, and in May 1666, the Ottoman army, under the personal leadership of the Grand Vizier, departed from Thrace for southern Greece, whence it would embark for Crete during the winter. In February 1667, the Venetians received significant reinforcements from France and Savoy, totaling 21 warships and some 6,000 men, but, as in past years, disagreements among the leaders of the various contingents over precedence (France, the Papal States, Malta, Naples, Sicily contributed ships and men) hampered operations. At the time, Catherine of Braganza, Queen of England, involved herself in the effort to relieve Candia, but failed to persuade her husband Charles II to take any action. Francesco Morosini, now again Captain General, sought to engage the Ottomans, but they avoided battle, and using their superior resources and bases, they steadily kept their forces on Crete supplied. The only allied success in 1667 was the repulsion of an Ottoman raid on Cerigo (Kythera).

On 8 March 1668, the Venetians were victorious in a hard-fought night battle off the island of St Pelagia, where 2,000 Ottoman troops and 12 galleys attempted to seize a small Venetian galley squadron. Forewarned of their intentions Morosini reinforced it, and won a costly victory, which was to be Venice's last victory at sea in this war. Reinforced again with Papal and Hospitaller ships, the Venetians maintained a blockade of Canea, the Ottomans' main supply base, during summer. To secure their anchorage off St Todero island, the allied forces seized the fortress island of St Marina, a minor success which did not in the end prevent the Kapudan pasha's fleet, bearing fresh troops and supplies, from reaching Canea in September, after the Maltese–Papal squadron had departed.

=== Fall of Candia ===
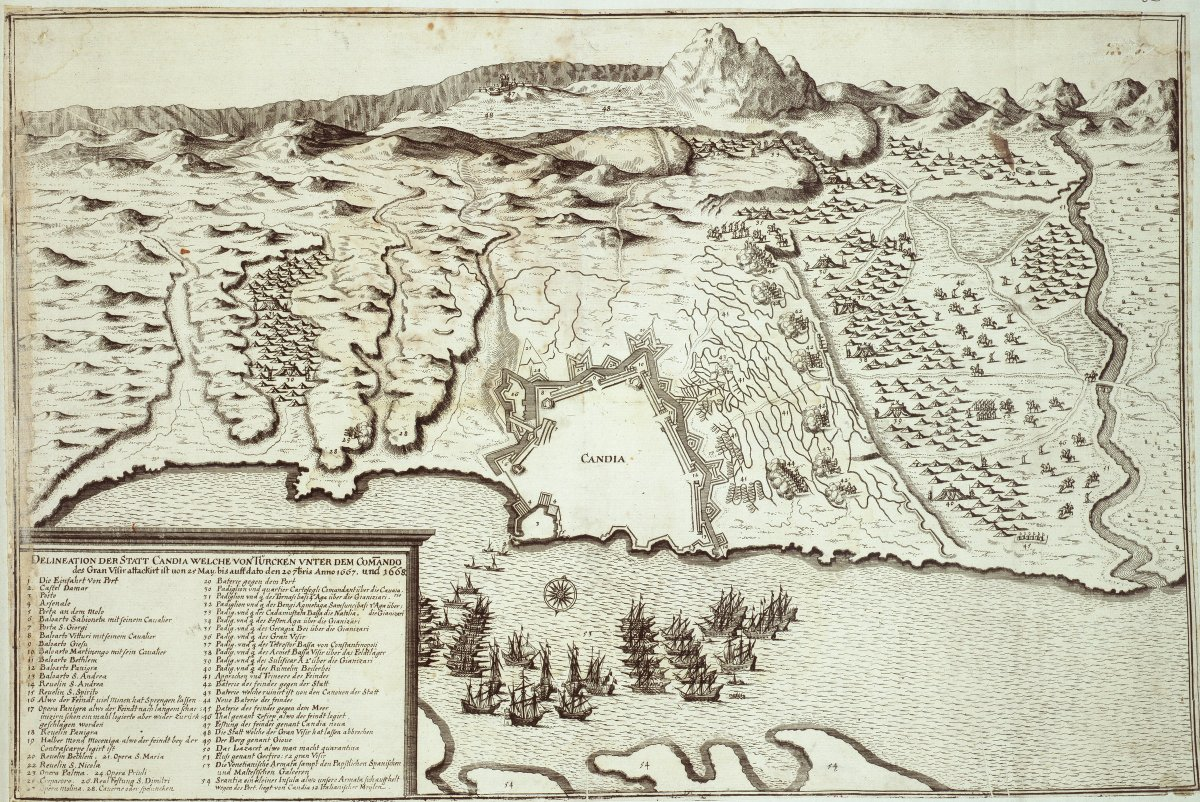
German map of the final phase of the Siege of Candia. It clearly illustrates the city's trace italienne fortifications, and the proximity of the characteristic Ottoman siege trenches, especially in the northwestern sector (bottom right), to the walls.

The new Ottoman army arrived on the island during the winter of 1666/1667, and in 22 May, the final phase of the siege, overseen by the Grand Vizier himself, began. It lasted 28 months. In the assaults sorties that followed, 108,000 Turks and 29,088 Christians lost their lives. These casualties included 280 Venetian noblemen, a figure equivalent to roughly a quarter of the Grand Council. Faced with the renewed Ottoman assault and a struggling economy, despite the prospect of considerable reinforcements from Western Europe, in 1668 the Signoria hoped to end the war by striking a peace settlement with the Ottomans. Indeed, the Venetians hoped to use the imminent arrival of reinforcements to secure concessions from the Ottomans. Admiral Andrea Valier was at first appointed as envoy, but fell ill and was quickly replaced by the elderly nobleman Alvise da Molin. Molin and his embassy traveled to Larissa, where the Ottoman court resided during one of the Sultan's hunting expeditions. The Ottomans proposed that Venice keep one half of Crete, but the Signoria, emboldened by further pledges of reinforcements, especially from France, and renewed turmoil at the Ottoman court and within the Empire, refused the offer. Molin, in the meantime transported by the Ottomans to Canea in Crete, was ordered to continue negotiations and to continue observing the Ottomans' strength and intentions, but not commit himself or the Republic.

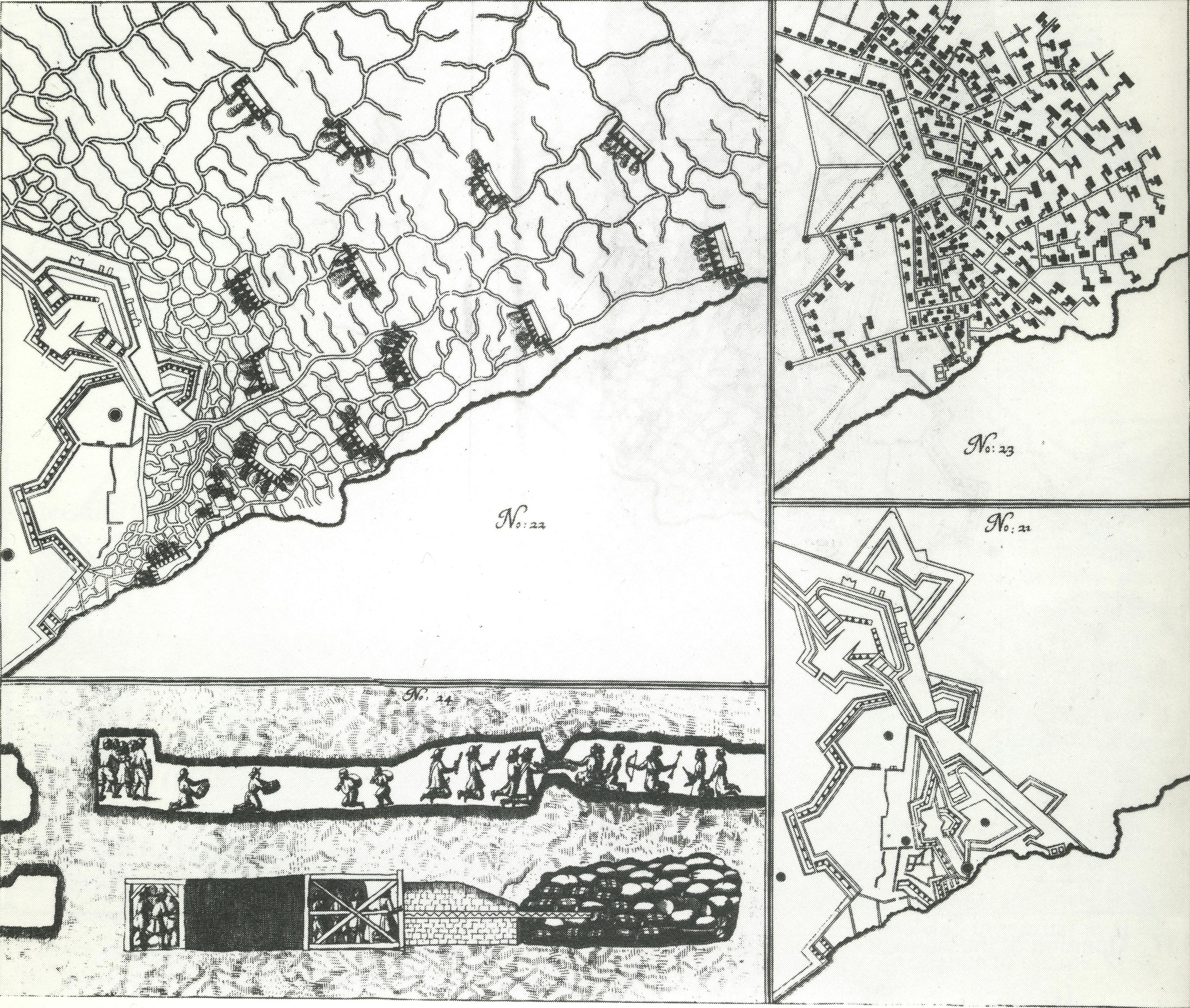
Schematics detailing the Ottoman trenches and mines and the Venetian counter-mines at Candia, by Johann Bernhard Scheither, 1672.

On 19 June, the first part of the long-awaited French contingent (in total some 6,000 soldiers and 31 ships), under the command of François, Duke of Beaufort, arrived at Candia. The second part, comprising the galley fleet, would arrive on 3 July. The Ottomans had been making steady progress over the past years, having reached the outer bastions of the fortress; the defenders were in dire straits, while most of the city of Candia lay ruined. The French staged their first sally on 25 June. Caught by surprise, the Ottomans were quickly routed, but the French became disorganized among the siege trenches, and an Ottoman counter-attack drove them back. The attack thus ended in disaster, costing the French some 800 dead, including the Duke of Beaufort himself, who was hit by a bullet and left on the field. The arrival of the second half of the French expeditionary force revived the defenders' morale, and a combined attack was agreed upon, involving bombardment of the Ottoman siege lines by the powerful allied fleet. The attack was launched on 25 July, in an impressive display of firepower: up to 15,000 cannonballs were said to have been fired by the fleet alone. The Ottomans however were well-protected by their deep earthworks, and suffered comparatively little damage, while things went awry for the Christian fleet, as an accident caused the explosion of the French flagship Thérèse, which in turn caused significant casualties among the surrounding French and Venetian ships.

This failure, coupled with the disaster of the previous month, further soured the relations between the French and the Venetians. Cooperation was distinctly lacking in the few operations attempted during the next few weeks, while the bad supply situation, the spread of sickness among their troops and the continuous attrition of their forces in the everyday fighting at Candia made the French commanders especially keen to depart. The French contingent eventually departed on 20 August. Two Ottoman assaults on the 25th were repulsed, but to Morosini, it was clear that the city could no longer be held. After a council of war on 27 August, but without first consulting Venice, it was decided to capitulate. On 5 September 1669, the city was surrendered to the Ottomans, while the survivors of the garrison, the citizens and their treasures were evacuated. On his own initiative, Morosini concluded a permanent peace agreement with the Ottomans, which, under the circumstances, was relatively generous: Venice would retain the Aegean islands of Tinos and Kythera and the isolated island fortresses of Spinalonga, Gramvousa and Souda off the Cretan coast, as well as the gains made in Dalmatia.

=== War in Dalmatia ===
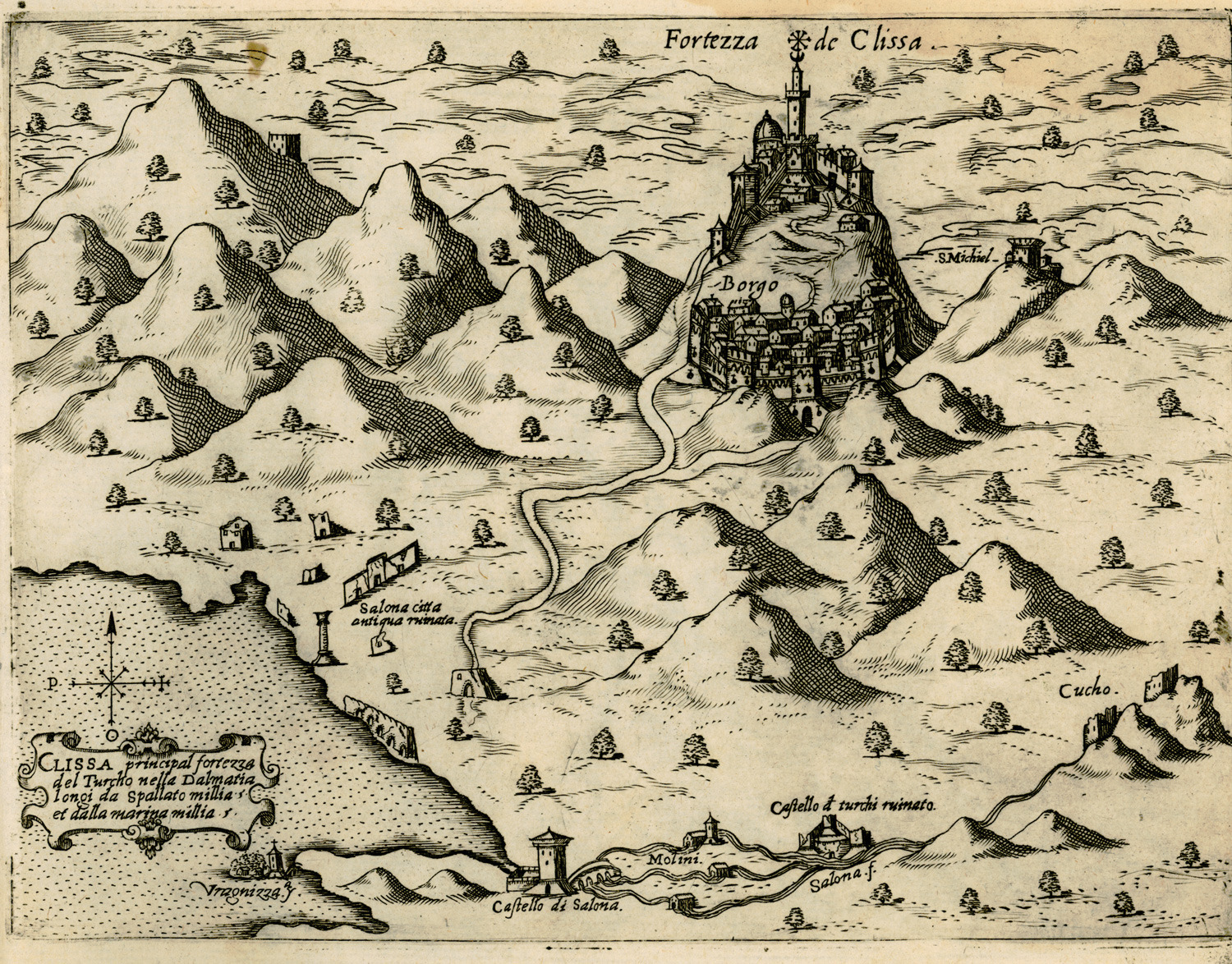
During the Candian War, the Venetians in Dalmatia with the support of the local population managed to compel the Ottoman garrison of Klis Fortress to surrender.

The Dalmatian front was a separate theater of operations, which was involved in the early phase of the war. The conditions there were almost reverse to those in Crete: for the Ottomans, it was too far away and relatively insignificant, while the Venetians operated near their own bases of supply and had undisputed control of the sea, being thus able to easily reinforce their coastal strongholds. The Ottomans launched a large-scale attack in 1646, and made some significant gains, including the capture of the islands of Krk, Pag and Cres, and most importantly, the supposedly impregnable fortress of Novigrad, which surrendered on 4 July, after only two days of bombardment. The Ottomans were now able to threaten the two main Venetian strongholds in Dalmatia, Zadar and Split. In the next year however, the tide turned, as the Venetian commander Leonardo Foscolo seized several forts, retook Novigrad, temporarily captured the fortress of Knin and took Klis, while a month-long siege of the fortress of Šibenik by the Ottomans in August and September failed. During the next few years, military operations stalled because of an outbreak of famine and plague amongst the Venetians at Zadar, while both sides focused their resources in the Aegean area. As other fronts took priority for the Ottomans, no further operations occurred in the Dalmatian theater. Peace in 1669 found the Republic of Venice with significant gains in Dalmatia, its territory tripled, and its control of the Adriatic thus secured.

=== Greek uprisings ===
During the course of the war, the Venetians sought to instigate Greek uprisings in several regions against the Turks. Such uprisings mainly took place in the Peloponnese and the Aegean islands, where the presence of Christian navy emboldened the Greeks to rebel against Ottoman rule. In 1647, when the Venetian general Giovanni Battista Grimani had blocked a large part of the Ottoman navy in Argolis, there was an uprising in Nauplio which was largely unsuccessful. In 1659 there were several small uprisings in Laconia, Messenia and Argolis.

During the spring of 1659, Francesco Morosini departed for Sifnos, where he met the former Patriarch of Constantinople Joannicius II and several other Greek clerics; subsequently they went to the Mani Peninsula in order to encourage a rebellion. In March 1659, although initially reluctant, the Maniots invaded and conquered Kalamata with support from the Christian allies. Several villages in northeastern Pelopponese, from Mani to Elis, rebelled around the same time. However, when the Ottomans counter-attacked, Morosini left the Peloponnese with several Greek notables and went to Milos. In August, in order to continue the uprisings, Morosini sent two Greek clerics from Crete to the Peloponnese, promising future military interventions from Venice, which never happened. Ultimately, the Ottomans closed in on the rebels, forcing them to either surrender or flee to Italy (especially Cargèse, Corsica, in modern-day France).

== Aftermath ==
The surrender of Candia ended the four and a half centuries of Venetian rule in Crete, and brought the Ottoman Empire to its temporary territorial zenith. At the same time, the cost and casualties incurred during this prolonged war contributed greatly to the decline of the Ottoman state during the latter 17th century. On the other hand, Venice had lost its greatest and most prosperous colony, its pre-eminent trading position in the Mediterranean had diminished, and its treasury was exhausted, having spent some 4,253,000 ducats on the defense of Candia alone. To all this, the Dalmatian gains were insufficient compensation. Upon his return to Venice in 1670, Morosini was tried on charges of insubordination and treason, but was acquitted. Fifteen years later, he would lead the Venetian forces in the Morean War, where the Republic attempted, for the last time, to reverse its losses and reestablish itself as one of the major powers of the Eastern Mediterranean. During that war, in 1692, a Venetian fleet attempted to retake Candia, but failed. The last Venetian strongholds off Crete fell in the last Ottoman–Venetian War in 1715. Crete would remain under Ottoman control until 1897, when it became an autonomous state. The island continued under nominal Ottoman suzerainty until the Balkan Wars. In their aftermath, the Ottoman Sultan dropped any claim on the island, and on 1 December 1913 it was formally united to Greece.

Following the fall of Candia, fears rose that the Ottomans would attack Malta. In 1670, the Order of St. John began to improve the island's defences with the construction of the Cottonera Lines and Fort Ricasoli.

== Sources ==
- Anderson, R. C. (1952). Naval Wars in the Levant 1559–1853. Princeton: Princeton University Press.
- Bostan, İdris (2009). "Navy". In Ágoston, Gábor; Masters, Bruce (eds.). Encyclopedia of the Ottoman Empire. New York: Facts on File, Inc. pp. 425–429. ISBN 978-0-8160-6259-1.
- Chasiotis, Ioannis (1974). "Πολεμικές συγκρούσεις στον ελληνικό χώρο και η συμμετοχή των Ελλήνων" [Conflicts in the Greek lands and the participation of the Greeks]. In Christopoulos, Georgios A. & Bastias, Ioannis K. (eds.). Ιστορία του Ελληνικού Έθνους [History of the Greek Nation] (in Greek). Vol. Ι: Ο Ελληνισμός υπό ξένη κυριαρχία (περίοδος 1453 - 1669), Τουρκοκρατία - Λατινοκρατία [Hellenism under Foreign Rule (Period 1453 - 1669), Turkocracy – Latinocracy]. Athens: Ekdotiki Athinon. pp. 252–323. ISBN 978-960-213-106-0.
- Cooper, J. P. (1979), The New Cambridge Modern History, Volume IV: The Decline of Spain and the Thirty Years War, 1609–48/59, CUP Archive, ISBN 978-0-521-29713-4
- Detorakis, Theocharis E. (1986). Ιστορία της Κρήτης [History of Crete] (in Greek). Athens. OCLC 715204595.
- Duffy, Christopher (1979), Siege Warfare, Routledge, ISBN 978-0-7100-8871-0
- Eickhoff, Ekkehard (2009). Venedig, Wien und die Osmanen: Umbruch in Südosteuropa 1645–1700 (in German) (Fifth ed.). Klett-Cotta. ISBN 978-3-608-94511-9.
- Faroqhi, Suraiya (2006), The Ottoman Empire and the World Around It, I.B. Tauris, ISBN 978-1-84511-122-9
- Finkel, Caroline (2006), Osman's Dream: The Story of the Ottoman Empire 1300–1923, London: John Murray, ISBN 978-0-7195-6112-2
- Finlay, George (1856), The History of Greece under Othoman and Venetian Domination, London: William Blackwood and Sons
- Fleet, Kate; Faroqhi, Suraiya; Kasaba, Reşat (2006), The Cambridge history of Turkey: the later Ottoman Empire, 1603-1839, Cambridge University Press, ISBN 978-0-521-62095-6
- Greene, Molly (2000), A Shared World: Christians and Muslims in the Early Modern Mediterranean, Princeton University Press, ISBN 978-0-691-00898-1
- Holt, P. M.; Lambton, Ann K. S.; Lewis, Bernard (1978), The Central Islamic Lands from Pre-Islamic Times to the First World War, Cambridge University Press, ISBN 978-0-521-29135-4
- Kunt, İ. Metin (2014). "Devolution from the Centre to the Periphery: An Overview of Ottoman Provincial Administration". In Duindam, Jeroen; Dabringhaus, Sabine (eds.). The Dynastic Centre and the Provinces: Agents and Interactions. Leiden: Brill. ISBN 978-90-04-27209-5.
- Lane, Frederic Chapin (1973), Venice, a Maritime Republic, JHU Press, ISBN 978-0-8018-1460-0
- Mason, Norman David (1972). The War of Candia, 1645-1669 (PhD). LSU Historical Dissertations and Theses. doi:10.31390/gradschool_disstheses.2351.
- Miller, William (1921). Essays on the Latin Orient. Cambridge: Cambridge University Press.
- Murphey, Rhoads; Black, Jeremy (1999), Ottoman warfare, 1500–1700, Routledge, ISBN 978-1-85728-389-1
- Nicolle, David (1989), The Venetian Empire, 1200–1670, Osprey Publishing, ISBN 978-0-85045-899-2
- Parry, Vernon J.; Cook, M. A. (1976), A History of the Ottoman Empire to 1730: Chapters from the Cambridge History of Islam and the New Cambridge Modern History, CUP Archive, ISBN 978-0-521-09991-2
- Setton, Kenneth Meyer (1991). Venice, Austria, and the Turks in the Seventeenth Century. Philadelphia: The American Philosophical Society. ISBN 0-87169-192-2.
- Shaw, Stanford Jay; Shaw, Ezel Kural (1976), History of the Ottoman Empire and Modern Turkey: Empire of the Gazis - The Rise and Decline of the Ottoman Empire, 1280–1808, Cambridge University Press, ISBN 978-0-521-29163-7
- Turnbull, Stephen (2003), The Ottoman Empire 1326–1699, Routledge, ISBN 978-0-415-96913-0
- Tzompanaki, Chrysoula (2008). Ο Κρητικός Πόλεμος 1645–1669: Η Μεγάλη Πολιορκία και η Εποποιϊα του Χάνδακα [The Cretan War 1645–1669: The Great Siege and Epopee of Chandax] (in Greek). Heraklion. ISBN 978-960-92052-4-5.
- Vakalopoulos, Apostolos E. (1968). Ιστορία του νέου ελληνισμού, Τόμος Γ': Τουρκοκρατία 1453–1669 [History of modern Hellenism, Volume III: Turkish rule 1453–1669] (in Greek). Thessaloniki: Emm. Sfakianakis & Sons.
