= Leonardo Foscolo =

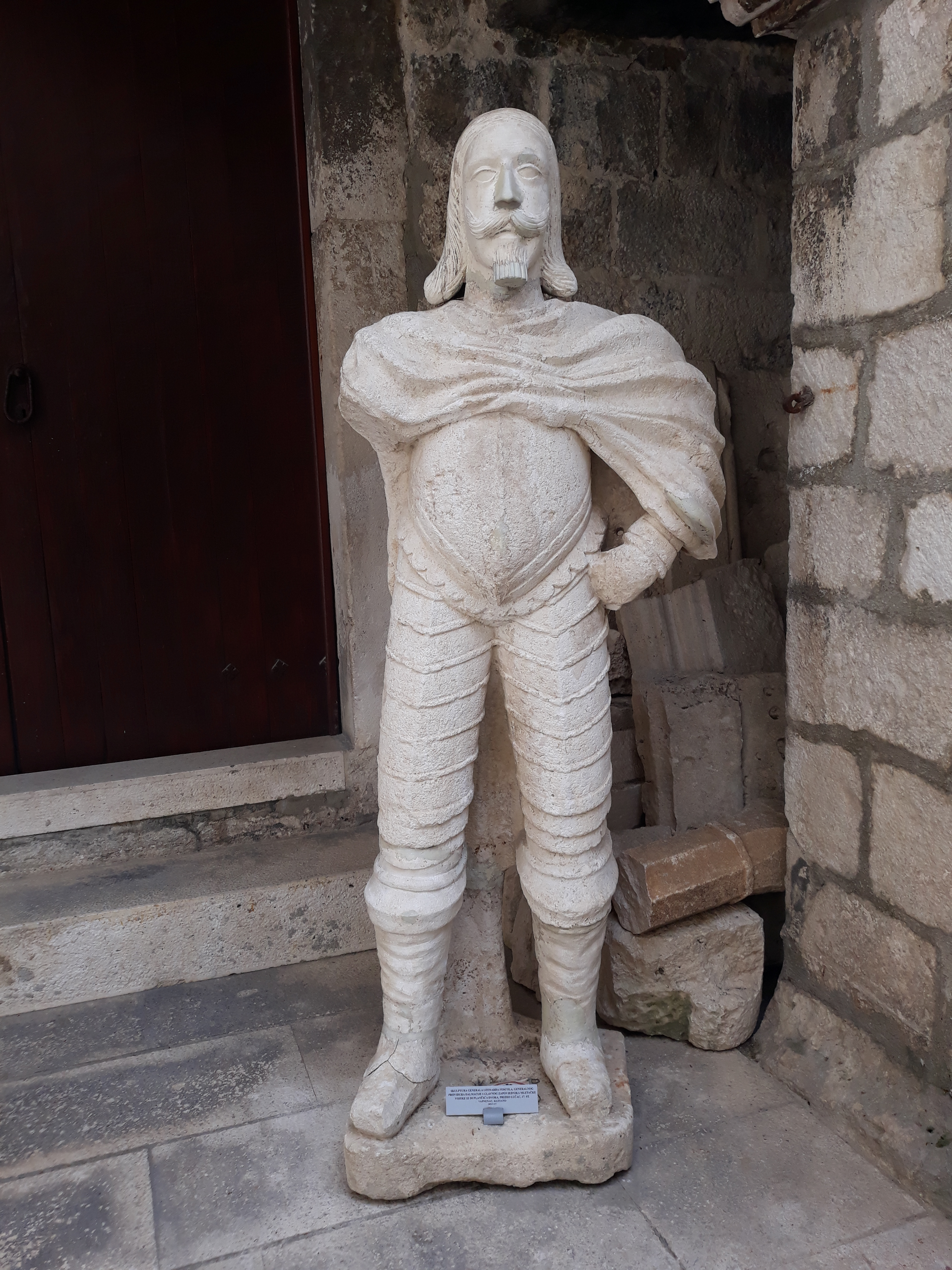
Statue of Foscolo in Split

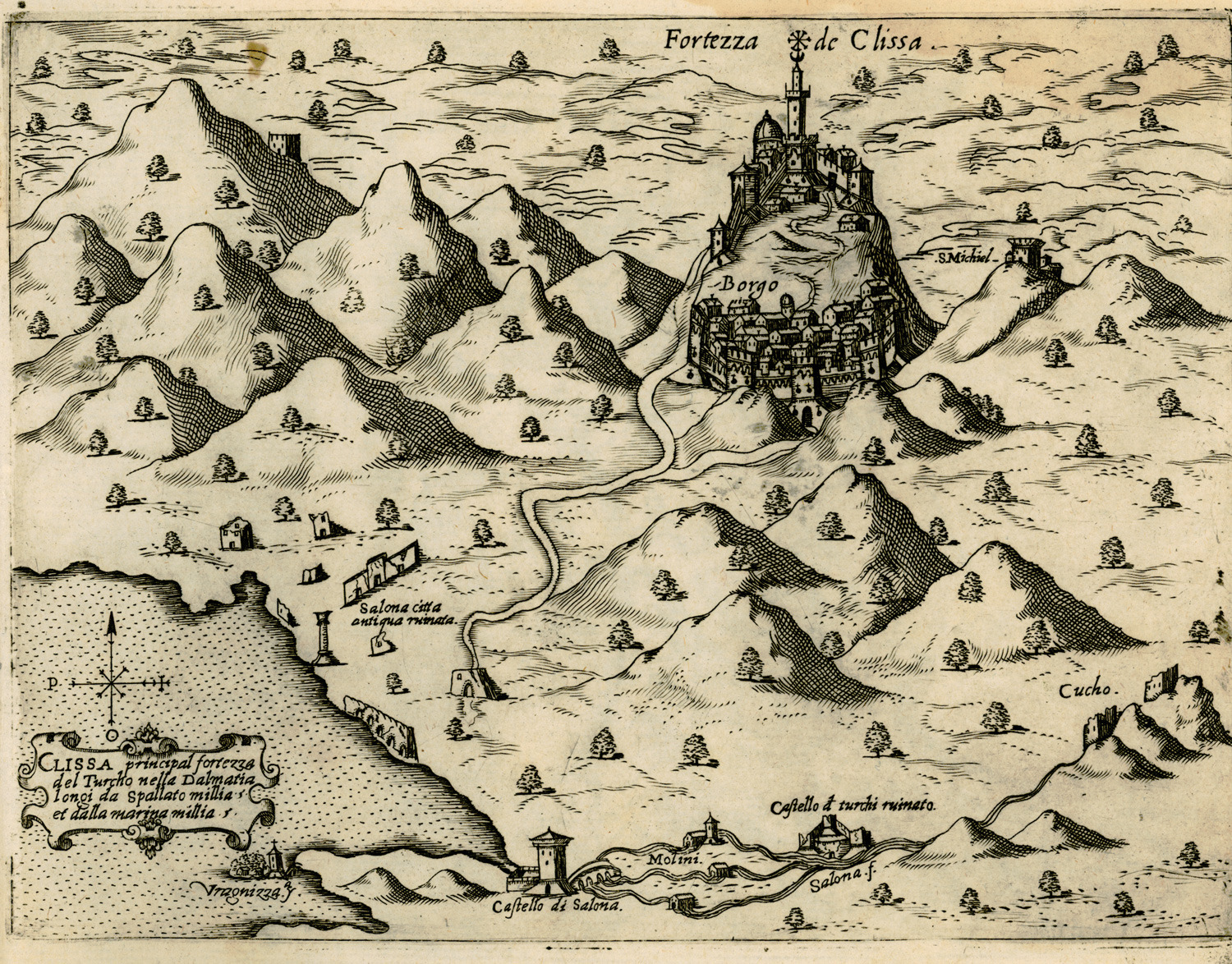
During the Candian War, the Venetians in Dalmatia with the support of the local population manage in compelling the Ottoman garrison of Klis Fortress to surrender.

Leonardo Foscolo (1588 – 1660) was a Venetian commander.

During the Cretan War, Leonardo Foscolo seized several forts, retook Novigrad, temporarily captured the Knin Fortress, and managed to compel the garrison of Klis Fortress to surrender.

== Bibliography ==
- Fraser, Robert William (1854). Turkey, Ancient and Modern. a History of the Ottoman Empire From the Period of Its Establishment to the Present Time. Edinburgh: Adam & Charles Black – Harvard University. ISBN 978-1-4021-2562-1.
- Setton, Kenneth Meyer (1991). Venice, Austria, and the Turks in the Seventeenth Century. Philadelphia: Diane Publishing. ISBN 0-87169-192-2.
- Federico Moro - Venezia e la guerra in Dalmazia (1644-1649) - Anno edizione: 2018
- Targhetta, Renata (1997). "FOSCOLO, Leonardo". Dizionario Biografico degli Italiani (in Italian). Vol. 49: Forino–Francesco da Serino. Rome: Istituto dell'Enciclopedia Italiana. ISBN 978-88-12-00032-6.
