= Action of 3 May 1657 =

1657 naval battle

- Part of Cretan War (1645–1669)
Date	3 May 1657
Location	Aegean Sea
Result	Venetian victory

Belligerents
Republic of Venice	Ottoman Empire

Commanders and leaders
Lazzaro Mocenigo	

Strength
8 ships	9 ships

The action of 3 May 1657 was a battle that took place on 3 May 1657 and was a victory for the Republic of Venice over the Ottoman fleet of Algiers. Venetian casualties were 117 killed and 346 wounded.
