= Action of 27 August 1661 =

Naval battle of the Cretan War

Coordinates: 36.6392°N 24.4198°E

Action of 27 August, 1661
- Part of Cretan War (1645–1669)
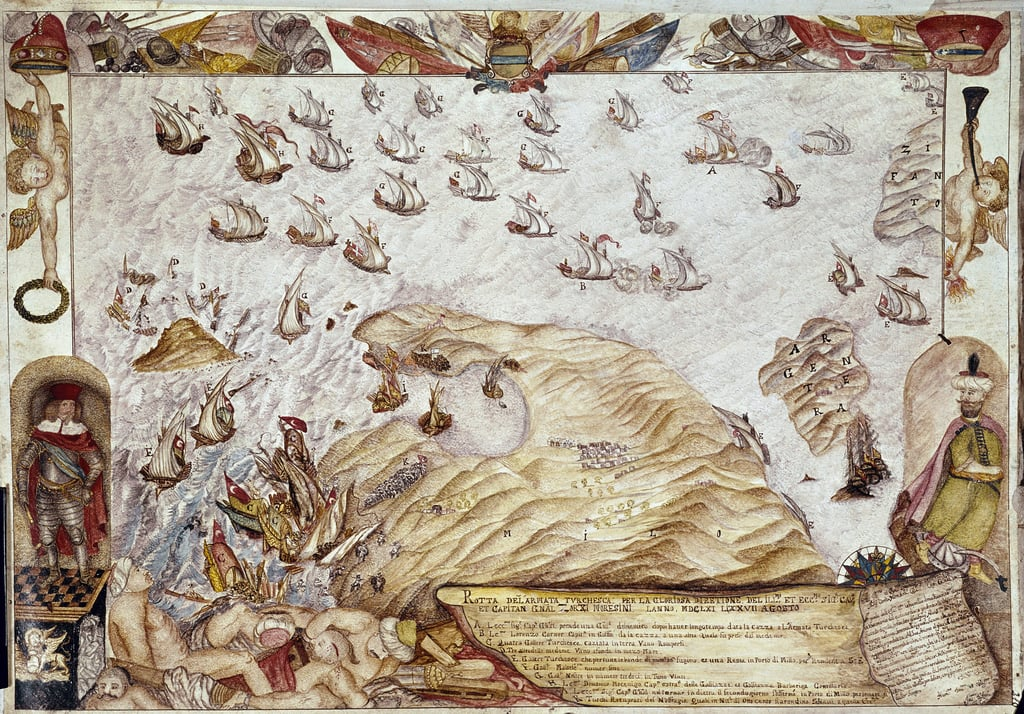
- Naval battle between the Turkish and Venetian fleets in 1661 (17th-century miniature)
Date	27 August 1661
Location	Milos, Greece
Result	Venetian–Hospitaller victory

Belligerents
Republic of Venice (Sovereign Military Order of Malta) Knights Hospitaller	Ottoman Empire

Commanders and leaders
(Republic of Venice) Giorgio Morosini (Sovereign Military Order of Malta) Ruffo	(Ottoman Empire) Unknown

Strength
20 galleys 2 galleasses	36 galleys

Casualties and losses
Unknown	5 galleys sunk 4 galleys captured

Action of 27 August 1661 was a naval battle that took place on 27 August 1661 near Milos, Greece between the Republic of Venice and the Knights Hospitaller over the Ottoman Empire.
