= Action of 26 May 1646 =

1646 naval battle

Coordinates: 40.02°N 26.15°E

This battle took place on 26 May 1646 at the mouth of the Dardanelles Strait, during the Cretan War. The Ottoman fleet under the Kapudan Pasha, Kara Musa Pasha, tried to defeat the Venetian fleet, under Tommaso Morosini. The Venetians were blockading the Dardanelles, trying thus to prevent reinforcements and supplies to be brought to Crete, a Venetian possessions which the Ottomans had invaded the previous year, and to disrupt the flow of supplies to the Ottoman capital, Constantinople.

The Ottoman fleet numbered 75 galleys and 5 galleasses, while the Venetian fleet was dispersed due to taking on water at Imbros; of the 28 sailing ships in Morosini's fleet, only seven took part in the action. After seven hours of battle, the Ottoman fleet withdrew back into the Strait, except for a few galleys that managed to slip through and reach Chios. Several Turkish ships were damaged, but none lost, although some accounts suggest that the ships that made it to Chios had to be abandoned due to their extensive damage.

Despite this success, the Ottoman fleet managed to break out of the Dardanelles shortly after. On 4 June, taking advantage of the becalmed sea and lack of wind, which immobilized the Venetian sailing ships, sixty Ottoman galleys dashed out of the Strait, and even towed four galleasses behind them. Morosini had previously asked Venice for galleys for this reason, but had received none. The Ottoman fleet went to Chios, where it was joined by ships from the Barbary states, and boarded 20,000 troops bound for Crete. Disagreements among the Venetian and allied commanders meant that the Christian fleet was unable to stop them from ferrying these men to Crete.

== Sources ==
- Anderson, R. C. (1952). Naval Wars in the Levant 1559–1853. Princeton: Princeton University Press.
- Setton, Kenneth Meyer (1991). Venice, Austria, and the Turks in the Seventeenth Century. Philadelphia: The American Philosophical Society. ISBN 0-87169-192-2.
