= Battle of the Dardanelles (1656) =

1656 naval battle

Third Battle of the Dardanelles
- Part of the Ottoman-Venetian War over Crete
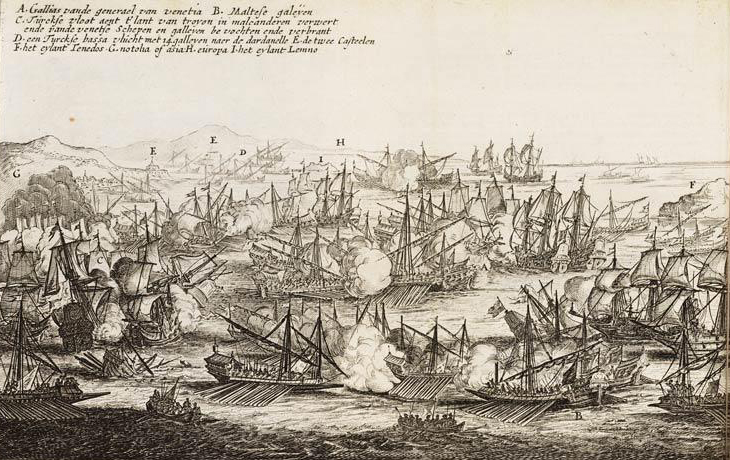
- Battle of the Dardanelles, by Pieter Casteleyn, 1657.
Date	26 June 1656
Location	Dardanelles Straits 40.2°N 26.4°E
Result	Venetian–Maltese victory

Belligerents
Republic of Venice (Sovereign Military Order of Malta) Order of Saint John	Ottoman Empire

Commanders and leaders
(Republic of Venice) Lorenzo Marcello † (Republic of Venice) Pietro Bembo (Republic of Venice) Barbado Badoer (Sovereign Military Order of Malta) Gregorio Carafa	Kenan Pasha

Strength
67 ships: 29 sailing ships; 7 galleasses; 31 galleys	98 ships: 28 sailing ships; 9 galleasses; 61 galleys

Casualties and losses
3 ships destroyed or captured	82 ships destroyed or captured

The Third Battle of the Dardanelles in the Fifth Ottoman-Venetian War took place on 26 and 27 June 1656 inside the Dardanelles Strait. The battle was a clear victory for Venice and the Knights Hospitaller over the Ottoman Empire, although their commander, Lorenzo Marcello, was killed on the first day.

== Background ==
Since 1645, Venice and the Ottoman Empire had been at war over the possession of the island of Crete. Ottoman forces had captured most of the island in the early years of the war, but were unable to seize its capital, the heavily fortified city of Candia (modern Heraklion). The Venetians had endeavoured to cut off supplies and reinforcements to the Ottoman army, and attempted several times to blockade the Straits of the Dardanelles, through which the Ottoman fleet had to sail to reach the Aegean Sea from its base around Constantinople.

== Preface ==
Marcello reached the island of Imbros, outside the Dardanelles Strait, on 23 May 1656 with 13 sailing ships, 6 galleasses and 24 galleys as well as some more vessels under Pietro Bembo. On 11 June, 7 Maltese galleys under Gregorio Carafa arrived, making a total of 29 sailing ships, 7 galleasses and 31 galleys.

On 23 June the Ottomans, under Kenan or Chinam Pasha, a Russian convert, appeared in the Strait with 28 sailing ships, 9 galleasses and 61 galleys. On 24 June Ottoman land batteries on either side of the Straits tried to drive the Venetians off but failed.

== Battle ==
In the morning of 26 June the wind was from the north, and the Ottomans made good progress, the Venetian galleys being unable to assist their sailing ships. Then the wind backed, turning to the SE, trapping the Ottomans against the Asian side of the Strait just below the Narrows, and a mêlée ensued. Kenan Pasha got back past the Narrows with 14 galleys but the rest were either captured, sunk or burnt. Sultan/San Marco was the most advanced Venetian ship and did the most to prevent the Ottoman retreat, but she ran aground under the Ottoman guns and was abandoned.

During the course of the battle, the Venetian Captain General Marcello was killed by a direct cannon hit, but his death kept a secret from all but his second, the provedditore of the fleet Barbaro Badoer.

Some small-scale fighting happened the next day, and at the end of it, the Ottoman fleet had lost 4 large sailing ships, 2 pinks, 5 galleasses and 13 galleys captured, and 22 sailing ships, 4 galleasses and 34 galleys sunk or burnt. Only 2 Ottoman sailing ships and 14 galleys escaped. Of the captured ships, Malta received 2 galleasses, 8 galleys and 1 "super galley" (or galleass?). The Venetians lost 3 sailing ships burnt and their casualties were 207 killed, 260 wounded and 94 missing. Maltese casualties were 40 killed and 100 or more wounded. Some 5,000 Christian slaves employed in the Ottoman fleet were freed.

== Aftermath ==
It was the heaviest naval defeat the Ottomans had suffered since the Battle of Lepanto, and enabled the Venetians to occupy the strategically important islands of Tenedos and Lemnos, thus establishing a tight blockade of the Straits. As a result, the resupply of Crete was effectively cut off, and Constantinople itself suffered a shortage of food during the winter. In a three-day battle in July 1657, however, the blockade would be broken again.

== Ships involved ==
=== Christian fleet ===
==== Venice (Lorenzo Marcello, with Pietro Bembo) ====
- Fregata Contarini
- Tomaso Francesco
- Principessa grande
- Tre Re
- Croce d'Oro
- Principessa piccola
- Gallo d'Oro
- Sacrificio d'Abram
- Aquila Coronata (Kronede Arend)
- Profeta Samuel
- Arma di Nassau - Burnt
- Lionessa
- Arma di Lech
- Leon Negro
- Madonna del Carmine
- Santa Caterina
- Profeta Elia
- San Bartolamio
- Fama Volante
- Ercole
- Rosa Bianca
- Speranza (or San Nicola)
- Principe di Colognia
- San Pietro (hired Dutch) - Burnt
- Sultana/San Marco (ex-Ottoman) - Aground, abandoned and burnt
- Santa Margarita
- Paramor
- ?
- ?
- 7 galleasses
- 24 galleys

==== Malta (Gregorio Carafa) ====
- 7 galleys

=== Ottoman Empire (Kenan Pasha) ===
- 4 large sailing ships - Captured
- 24 other sailing ships - 22 sunk/burnt
- 2 pinks - Captured
- 9 galleasses - 5 captured, 4 sunk/burnt
- 61 galleys - 13 captured, 34 sunk/burnt

== See also ==
- Battle of Cape Gelidonya – Previous naval battle also compared to Lepanto
- Battle of Focchies – Naval battle of the Cretan War also won by Venice while outnumbered
- Battle of Matapan – Last naval battle between Venetians and Ottomans

== Sources ==
- Anderson, R. C. (1952). Naval Wars in the Levant 1559–1853. Princeton: Princeton University Press.
- Finkel, Caroline (2006). Osman's Dream: The Story of the Ottoman Empire 1300-1923. London: John Murray. ISBN 978-0-7195-6112-2.
- Setton, Kenneth Meyer (1991). Venice, Austria, and the Turks in the Seventeenth Century. Philadelphia: The American Philosophical Society. ISBN 0-87169-192-2.
