= Action of 18 May 1657 =

1657 naval battle

This battle took place on 18 May 1657 and was a victory for the Republic of Venice over the main Ottoman Navy and the fleet of the Ottoman province of Algiers. The naval action allowed Venetian ships to land and take the fort at Suazich.
