= Battle of the Dardanelles (1655) =

1655 naval battle

Coordinates: 40°2′N 26°4′E

Second Battle of the Dardanelles
- Part of the Ottoman-Venetian War over Crete
Date	21 June 1655
Location	Dardanelles Straits
Result	Venetian victory

Belligerents
Republic of Venice	Ottoman Empire

Commanders and leaders
(Republic of Venice) Lazzaro Mocenigo	Kara Mustafa Pasha

Strength
26 sailing ships 6 galleys 4 galleasses	36 sailing ships 60 galleys 8 galleasses

This battle took place on 21 June 1655 inside the mouth of the Dardanelles Strait. It was a clear victory for Venice over the Ottoman Empire during the Cretan War.

== Background ==
The Venetians, under Lazzaro Mocenigo, continued their strategy of blockading the Dardanelles, to prevent the Ottomans from resupplying their forces in the Aegean Sea. The orders were the same as for the previous year - remain at anchor until the Ottoman fleet passed, then attack the rear - and this time the plan worked. The previous Kapudan Pasha (Grand Admiral), Murat Pasha, had been promoted to Grand Vizier and his replacement, Mustafa Pasha, had 36 sailing ships, 8 galleasses and 60 galleys, as well as perhaps several galleys from outside the Dardanelles.

== Battle ==
Once again, the Ottomans were arranged in 3 lines abreast: Sailing ships, then galleasses, then galleys. The Venetians had 26 sailing ships, 4 galleasses and 6 galleys.

As the Ottomans advanced, one galleass was sunk and one galley burnt and the rowing vessels retreated, after which the Venetians attacked the Ottoman sailing ships, resulting in 9 being burnt and 2 wrecked. The only Venetian loss was David Golia, which was burnt. Venetian casualties exclusive of the sunken ship were 126 killed and 180 wounded. 358 Ottomans were taken prisoner.

== Ships involved ==
=== Venice (Lazzaro Mocenigo) ===
(some were hired from the Netherlands, Britain and France)
? ("capitana")
Aquila Coronata
Concordia
Profeta Samuel
Tomaso Francesco
Campo d'Oche
Principessa grande
Tre Re
Croce d'Oro
Sacrificio d'Abramo
Lepre Rosso
Principessa piccola
Corona
Gallo d'Oro
Ercole grande
Re David
Isabella Maria
David Golia (sunk)
Pesce Triglio
Ercole piccolo
Arma di Nassau
Lionessa
Arma di Lech
Sant' Antonio di Padova
Leon Negro
6 galleys
4 galleasses

=== Ottomans (Mustapha) ===
36 sailing ships - 9 burnt, 2 wrecked
8 galleasses - 1 sunk
60 galleys - 1 burnt
