= Action of 29 September 1662 =

1662 naval battle

The action of 29 September 1662 took place between Kos and Kalimnos, Greece, when a Venetian fleet attacked and defeated the regular Turkish cargo fleet and its escort which were on their way to Alexandria. The Venetian fleet managed to sink some 4 ships and 28 other smaller vessels.
