= Lazzaro Mocenigo =

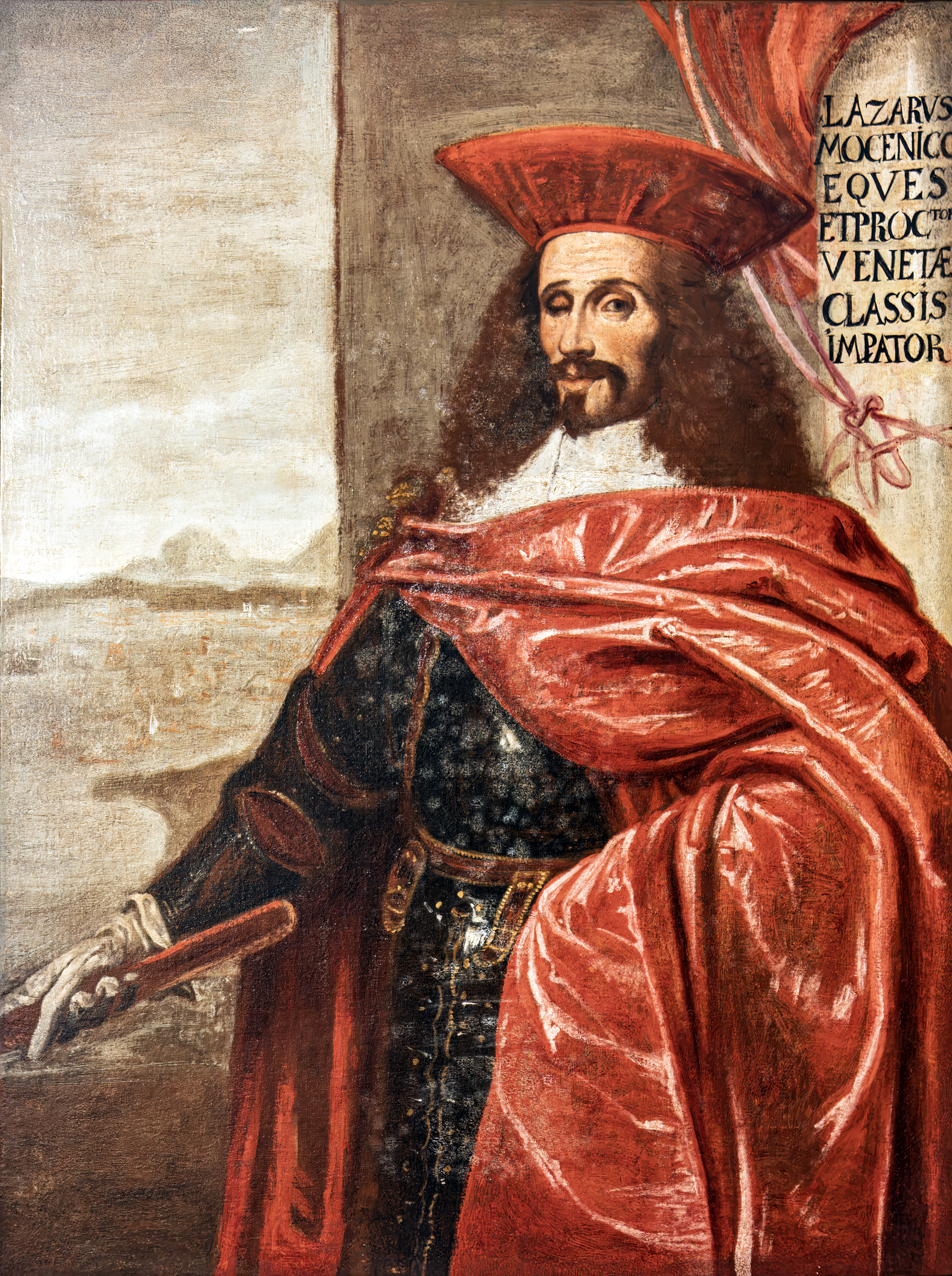
- Portrait of Lazzaro Mocenigo
- Born: 9 July 1624; Venice, Republic of Venice
- Died: 17 July 1657 (aged 33) Dardanelles, Ottoman Empire
- Allegiance: Republic of Venice
- Branch: (Republic of Venice) Venetian Navy
- Rank: Captain General of the Sea
- Conflicts: Battles of the Dardanelles during the Cretan War

Lazzaro Mocenigo (9 July 1624 - 17 July 1657) was a Venetian nobleman who distinguished himself as an admiral during the Cretan War against the Ottoman Empire.

== Biography ==
Born in Venice (San Stae), he was the second of four sons of Giovanni di Antonio and Elena di Antonmaria Bernardo, widow of Giorgio Contarini. Mocenigo dedicated his life to the craft of arms, lived on the sea to counter Turkish power, and not without moments of heroism: for example in 1650 in Nixia when, although wounded by an arrow in his left arm and mutilated of a finger by a musket shot, he continued to fight fiercely.

The outbreak of the war against the Turks, in 1645, allowed him to make a career for himself. By 1650 he was galley captain (sopracomito), and already in 1654 he was captain of a galeass in the first Venetian expedition against the Dardanelles.

When the admiral died and his deputy was recalled to his homeland, he found himself in command of the entire fleet (although officially under the command of the provveditore Francesco Morosini, engaged in the defense of the fortress of Candia in Crete). On 21 June 1655 he defeated the Ottoman fleet before the Dardanelles, while in 1656 he again distinguished himself in an attempt of assisting Crete. During this battle, he lost one eye, but continued to fight fiercely. He was nicknamed Kor Kaptan ("One-eyed Captain") by the Turks.

He then participated in the Fourth Battle of the Dardanelles in 1657. A cannon shot from a Turkish coastal battery caused a mast to fall which hit him, killing him.

He was one of the few Venetian naval officers to have participated, albeit to varying degrees, in all expeditions to the Dardanelles. His death proved fatal for the fate of the anti-Ottoman alliance. With his death the battle was lost, the Venetian blockade broken, causing a rift among Venice, Malta and the Papal States, while giving the Turks time to prepare a successful counter-offensive.

== Sources ==
- Anderson, R. C. (1952). Naval Wars in the Levant 1559–1853. Princeton: Princeton University Press.
- Eickhoff, Ekkehard (2009). Venedig, Wien und die Osmanen: Umbruch in Südosteuropa 1645–1700 (in German) (Fifth ed.). Klett-Cotta. ISBN 978-3-608-94511-9.
- Setton, Kenneth Meyer (1991). Venice, Austria, and the Turks in the Seventeenth Century. Philadelphia: The American Philosophical Society. ISBN 0-87169-192-2.
