= Battle of the Dardanelles (1657) =

Naval battle in the Fifth Ottoman-Venetian War

Fourth Battle of the Dardanelles
- Part of the Ottoman-Venetian War over Crete
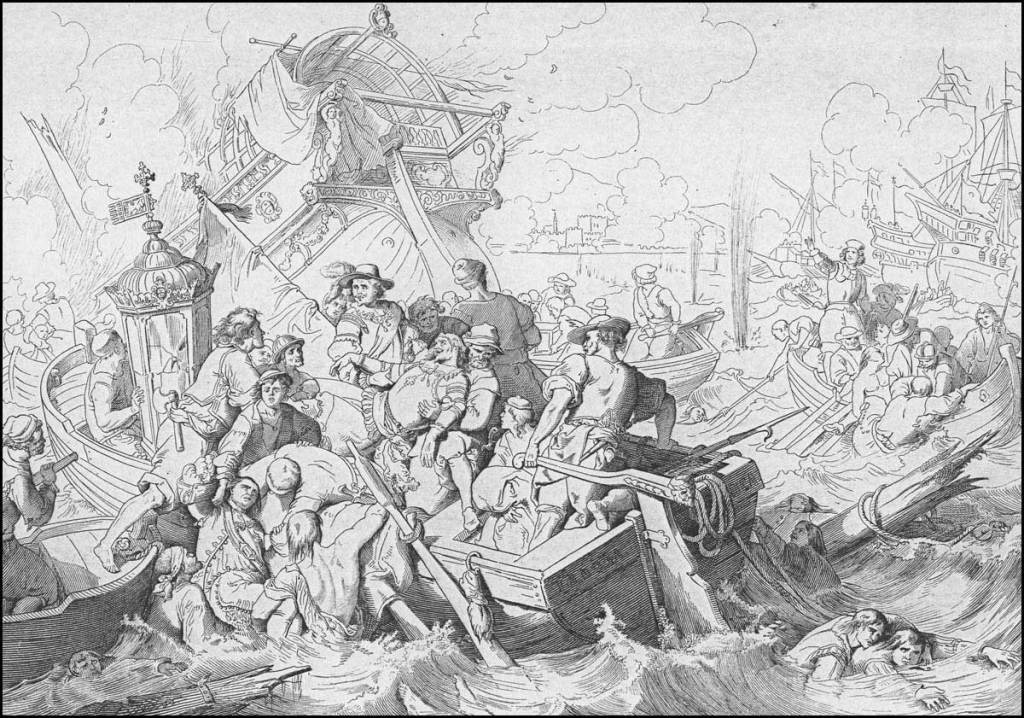
- Death of Lazzaro Mocenigo, by Giuseppe Lorenzo Gatteri
Date	17–19 July 1657
Location	Dardanelles Straits, NE Aegean Sea 40.2°N 26.4°E
Result	Ottoman victory

Belligerents
Ottoman Empire	Republic of Venice (Sovereign Military Order of Malta) Order of Saint John; Papal States

Commanders and leaders
Köprülü Mehmed Pasha	(Republic of Venice) Lazzaro Mocenigo † (Republic of Venice) Giuseppe Delfino

Strength
28 sailing ships 9 galleasses 10 galleys	2 galleasses 8 light galleys 17 sailing ships

Casualties and losses
5 vessels sunk, 3 captured, several damaged.	Unknown

The Fourth Battle of the Dardanelles in the Fifth Ottoman-Venetian War took place between 17 and 19 July 1657 outside the mouth of the Dardanelles Strait. The Ottomans succeeded in breaking the Venetian blockade over the Strait.

Venice's navy had been positioned at the south of the narrows during the engagement. A strong northerly wind had given the Turkish a favorable position.
