= 1354 =

1354 in various calendars
- Gregorian calendar: 1354; MCCCLIV
- Ab urbe condita: 2107
- Armenian calendar: 803; ԹՎ ՊԳ
- Assyrian calendar: 6104
- Balinese saka calendar: 1275–1276
- Bengali calendar: 760–761
- Berber calendar: 2304
- English Regnal year: 27 Edw. 3 – 28 Edw. 3
- Buddhist calendar: 1898
- Burmese calendar: 716
- Byzantine calendar: 6862–6863
- Chinese calendar: 癸巳年 (Water Snake); 4051 or 3844 — to — 甲午年 (Wood Horse); 4052 or 3845
- Coptic calendar: 1070–1071
- Discordian calendar: 2520
- Ethiopian calendar: 1346–1347
- Hebrew calendar: 5114–5115
- Hindu calendars
- Vikram Samvat: 1410–1411
- Shaka Samvat: 1275–1276
- Kali Yuga: 4454–4455
- Holocene calendar: 11354
- Igbo calendar: 354–355
- Iranian calendar: 732–733
- Islamic calendar: 754–755
- Japanese calendar: Bunna 3 (文和３年)
- Javanese calendar: 1266–1267
- Julian calendar: 1354; MCCCLIV
- Korean calendar: 3687
- Minguo calendar: 558 before ROC 民前558年
- Nanakshahi calendar: −114
- Thai solar calendar: 1896–1897
- Tibetan calendar: ཆུ་མོ་སྦྲུལ་ལོ་ (female Water-Snake); 1480 or 1099 or 327 — to — ཤིང་ཕོ་རྟ་ལོ་ (male Wood-Horse); 1481 or 1100 or 328

July 13: King David II of Scotland agrees to pay ransom for release from England

Year 1354 (MCCCLIV) was a common year starting on Wednesday of the Julian calendar.

== Events ==
=== January–March ===
- January 8 – Charles de la Cerda, the Constable of France, the highest of the Grands officiers serving King Jean II, is assassinated in Normandy in the town of L'Aigle on orders of King Carlos II of Navarre.
- January 21 – At Heian-kyō (now Kyoto, the Emperor Go-Kōgon is enthroned in Japan as the Northern Emperor, although he had ruled northern Japan since the 1352 after the death of his older brother, the Emperor Sukō. In southern Japan at Tokyo, where Go-Kōgon claims rule as pretender to the Chrysanthemum Throne, the Emperor Go-Murakami is in his 15th year as the recognized ruler of the Empire.
- February 12 – The Treaty of Stralsund settles border disputes between the duchies of Mecklenburg and Pomerania.
- March 2 – A strong earthquake destroys the city of Gallipoli and its city walls, weakening its defenses, along with destroying the neighboring villages and towns in the area. Within a month after the devastating earthquake the Ottomans besiege and capture the town, making Gallipoli the first Ottoman stronghold in Europe and the staging area for Ottoman expansion across the Balkans.
- March 15 – King Edward III summons the English Parliament, directing them to meet in Westminster on April 28.

=== April–June ===
- April 6 – The Treaty of Guînes is signed in France between representatives of the kingdoms of England and France, after the dispute between the two kingdoms is mediated by Pope Innocent VI and Cardinal Guy of Boulogne in an effort to end the Hundred Years' War. The "treaty of perpetual peace" is never ratified.
- April 10 – Four days after the signing of an agreement to end the Hundred Years War, the armies of England and France fight the Battle of Montmuran in the course of the Breton War of Succession between the House of Montfort (supported by England) and the House of Blois (supported by France).
- April 19 – At Srinagar, now in the Jammu and Kashmir state of India, Shihabu'd-Din Shah becomes the new Sultan of Kashmir, succeeding his late father, Alauddin Shah.
- April 28 – The 31st parliament of King Edward III opens a three-week session.
- May 20 – The English Parliament adjourns after passing multiple acts, and King Edward III gives royal assent to the Liberty of Subject Act 1354, still in force providing that "No person shall be condemned without his answer," an early statement of the right to due process of law, as well as the Lords of Marches of Wales Act (directing that nobles shall be "attendant to the crown of England, and not to the principality of Wales"; and the Exportation of Iron Act ("No iron shall he carried forth of the realm."
- June 10 – In Cairo, Sarim al-Din Ibrahim, ruler of the Ramadanid Emirate in what is now the Anatolia region of Turkey, makes a gift of 1,000 horses to the Mamluk Sultan of Egypt and is given recognition as the "Emir of the Turkomans". Yinanç, Refet (1988). Dulkadir Beyliği (in Turkish). Ankara: Turkish Historical Society Press. p. 19.
- June 22 – The siege of Alghero, located on the island of Sicily, begins as King Pedro IV of Aragon arrives on the island's coast with 100 ships and 12,000 men
- June – In what is now Laos, Fa Ngum is crowned as King of Lan Xang at Vientiane.

=== July–September ===
- July 13 – Scotland and England reach an agreement for the release of King David II of Scotland, who been taken as a prisoner of war in battle at Neville's Cross, near Durham, on October 17, 1353. Under the terms of the treaty, the Scots agree to pay a ransom of 90,000 merks sterling (equivalent to 30.25 kilograms (1,067 oz) of silver), in nine annual installments, and 20 hostages "of noble birth" (primarily sons of 20 nobles) are to be sent to England in exchange for King David until the balance of the ransom is paid off.
- August 16 – War of the Straits: The Venetian-ruled town of Poreč is sacked by the Genoese under Paganino Doria, who carry off the relics of saints Eleutherius and Maurus of Parentium to Genoa, where they were deposited at the church of San Matteo.
- September 11 – Marino Faliero is elected as the new Doge of the Republic of Venice, four days after the death of the Doge Andrea Dandolo.

=== October–December ===
- October 8 – Cola di Rienzo, self-proclaimed "tribune" of Rome, is killed by an angry mob.
- November 4 – War of the Straits: The Genoese fleet under Paganino Doria defeats and captures the entire Venetian fleet under Niccolò Pisani at the Battle of Sapienza.
- November 29 – Sava IV becomes the new Patriarch of the Serbian Orthodox Christian Church after the September 3 death of the Partriarch Joanikije II.
- December 10 – The reign of John VI Kantakouzenos as Byzantine Emperor is ended, after John V Palaiologos retakes Constantinople and is restored as sole emperor.

=== Date unknown ===
- After 24 years of struggling for independence, since the Battle of Posada, Nicholas Alexander of Wallachia becomes a vassal to Hungarian king Louis I.
- Early in the year, Ibn Battuta returns from his travels at the command of Abu Inan Faris, sultan of Morocco, who appoints a scribe to write an account of the adventures.

== Births ==
- Constance of Castile, wife of John of Gaunt (d. 1394)
- Denis, Lord of Cifuentes, infante of Portugal (d. c.1397)
- Alonso Enríquez, Spanish nobleman (d. 1429)
- Frederick III, Count of Moers, German nobleman (d. 1417)
- Gilbert de Greenlaw, Scottish bishop (d. 1421)
- Jean de Grouchy, Norman knight (k. 1435)
- Margaret of Joinville, French noblewoman (d. 1418)
- Thomas de Morley, 4th Baron Morley, English nobleman (d. 1416)
- Eric IV, Duke of Saxe-Lauenburg (d. 1411/12)
- Roger de Scales, 4th Baron Scales, English nobleman (d. 1387)
- Catherine of Vendôme, French noblewoman (d. 1412)
- Violante Visconti, Italian noblewoman (d. 1386)
- Walram IV, Count of Nassau-Idstein, German nobleman (d. 1393)

== Deaths ==
=== January–March ===
- January 8 – Charles de La Cerda (b. 1327)
- January 16 – Joanna of Châtillon, Duchess of Athens (b. c. 1285)

=== April–June ===
- June 1 – Kitabatake Chikafusa, Japanese court noble (b. 1293)

=== July–September ===
- August 9 – Stephen, Duke of Slavonia, Hungarian prince (b. 1332)
- September 7 – Andrea Dandolo, doge of Venice (b. 1306)

=== October–December ===
- October 5 – Giovanni Visconti, Italian Roman Catholic cardinal (b. 1290)
- October 8 – Cola di Rienzo, Roman tribune (b. c. 1313)
- October 19 – Yusuf I, Sultan of Granada (b. 1318)
- date unknown – Wu Zhen, Chinese painter (b. 1280)
