= Giovanni II Valente =

3rd Doge of Genoa from 1350 to 1353

3rd Lifetime Doge of the Republic of Genoa
- In office 9 January 1350 – 8 October 1353
- Preceded by: Giovanni I di Murta
- Succeeded by: Position vacant

Personal details
- Born: 1280 Genoa, Republic of Genoa
- Died: 1360 (aged 79–80) Genoa, Republic of Genoa
- Party: Popolani

Giovanni II Valente (1280–1360) was the third Doge of Genoa from 1350 to 1353. His time in office was marked by the crushing defeat of the city against the Venetians at the naval Battle of Alghero. Giovanni had already asked to succeed the first doge of the Republic in December 1345 but had turn down the responsibility.

== A doge at war ==
After the death of his predecessor, Giovanni I da Murta, a short crisis of succession ensued. The popolani supported Luchino Fieschi while the patricians and the partisans of the late doge backed his son, Tommaso da Murta. Giovanni Valente finally emerged as a candidate of compromise and was elected on 9 January 1350.

When Valente abandoned the careful foreign policy of his predecessor and tried to expel entirely the Venetians from the Black Sea, the tension between Genoa and Venice erupted into open warfare, the "War of the Straits". Each navy plundered the merchant fleets of the opposing side in the Eastern Mediterranean. Venice formed an alliance with Byzantium and the Crown of Aragon, forcing the Genoese to seek the support of the Ottomans. On 17 November 1350, to pay for the expenses of the war, the Republic had to levy a forced-loan of 300,000 lire at an interest of 10% from an association of creditors known as the Compera imposita per gerra Venetorum.

On 9 March 1352 the Genoese fleet, under the command of Paganino Doria, won a naval victory at the Battle of the Bosporus against the coalition near Constantinople. The following year, in August, near Alghero, on the island of Sardinia, the Genoese navy, under Antonio de' Grimaldi was crushed by the Venetians.

== Resignation ==
Confronted with the threat of a new civil war breaking out in the city and the prospect of foreign invasion, the council had to call for the support of the Visconti of Milan. The doge lost any executive power and Giovanni Valente had to resign from the dogate on 8 October 1353 and the position became vacant. He died seven years later and may have been buried at the church of San Bartolomeo dell'Olivella in Genoa.
