= Pancrazio Giustinian =

Pancrazio Giustinian was a Venetian patrician, magistrate, and military commander active in 1332–1352.

== Life ==
Pancrazio Giustinian was the son of the Procurator of Saint Mark Marco Giustinian, of the noble House of Giustinian. The details of his birth and early life are unknown, and as is common with Venetian patrician houses, the existence of multiple persons with the same name make tracing his career difficult. His wife's name is likewise unknown, but he had three sons: Dardi, Mosè, and Marco. Only Marco is attested in the sources, serving as envoy to the Kingdom of Cyprus in 1364.

Pancrazio Giustinian is first securely attested in 1332, already a member of the Venetian Senate, when he was issued a fine for illegally importing wine from Crete. In May–June 1334 he was member of a commission set up to examine relations with Varmo, a town in Friuli, and in 1336 he was involved in drafting a resolution on the merchant galleys sent to the Byzantine Empire. Giustinian's first major public office was in October 1344, during the Smyrniote crusade, when he replaced the fallen Pietro Zeno in command of the forces at Smyrna until the arrival of Niccolò Barbarigo.

Back in Venice, Giustinian was elected Procurator of Saint Mark on 24 January 1346. On 3 August 1348 he was one of the five Venetian commissioners tasked with the final negotiations of a peace treaty with the envoys King Louis I of Hungary, leading to the conclusion of the treaty on 5 August. When the city of Capodistria rebelled against Venetian rule in September of the same year, Giustinian was appointed in command of the land forces sent to suppress it, along with Marco Soranzo as head of the fleet. Capodistria was forced to capitulate without bloodshed on 10 October, after the inhabitants received guarantees that neither they nor their property would be harmed. After a mission to Apulia, in December 1348 Giustinian was involved in the arbitration of the inheritance disputes after the death of the patrician Andrea da Mosto. His colleagues were two other distinguished Venetian patricians, Marco Loredan and the future Doge, Marino Faliero.

Following the outbreak of the War of the Straits with the Republic of Genoa, in September 1351 Giustinian was given command of a fleet of 13 galleys. He sailed to Sicily, where he joined the allied Aragonese fleet of 22 ships under Pons di Santapau. Together they sailed east, relieving the siege of the Venetian colony of Negroponte by the Genoese admiral Paganino Doria. Doria was forced to withdraw east to Chios and thence Galata, with the allies under Niccolò Pisani following slowly, as they were delayed and suffered casualties due to storms. On February 13, 1352, the Venetian, Aragonese, and their allied Byzantine ships engaged the Genoese in the confused and bloody Battle of the Bosporus, fought during the night amidst a storm. The battle ended without a decisive outcome but heavy casualties on both sides. Giustinian was among the fallen, and was later buried in a church in Constantinople.

== Sources ==
- Musarra, Antonio (2020). Il Grifo e il Leone: Genova e Venezia in lotta per il Mediterraneo (in Italian). Bari and Rome: Editori Laterza. ISBN 978-88-581-4072-7.
- Ravegnani, Giorgio (2001). "GIUSTINIAN, Pancrazio". Dizionario Biografico degli Italiani (in Italian). Vol. 57: Giulini–Gonzaga. Rome: Istituto dell'Enciclopedia Italiana. ISBN 978-88-12-00032-6.
