= War of the Straits =

1350–1355 war between Venice and Genoa

- Part of the Venetian–Genoese wars
Date	1350–1355
Location	Aegean Sea, Bosporus, Adriatic Sea, Sardinia
Result	Inconclusive

Belligerents
Republic of Venice; Crown of Aragon (1351–1355); Byzantine Empire (1351–1352); Duchy of Naxos	Republic of Genoa; Ottomans (1351–1352); Aydinids (1351–1352); Judicate of Arborea (1353–1354)

Commanders and leaders
(Republic of Venice) Andrea Dandolo; (Republic of Venice) Marco Ruzzini; (Republic of Venice) Niccolò Pisani (POW); (Republic of Venice) Pancrazio Giustinian †; (Crown of Aragon) Pons de Santapau †; (Crown of Aragon) Bernat II de Cabrera; (Byzantine Empire) John VI Kantakouzenos	(Republic of Genoa) Giovanni II Valente; (Republic of Genoa) Giovanni Visconti; (Republic of Genoa) Filippo Doria; (Republic of Genoa) Paganino Doria; (Republic of Genoa) Antonio Grimaldi; Marianus IV of Arborea

The War of the Straits (Italian: Guerra degli Stretti) or Third Genoese–Venetian War was a conflict fought between the Republic of Venice and the Republic of Genoa, and their allies, in 1350–1355. The third in a series of conflicts between the two major Italian maritime republics, the war resulted from the intense commercial and political rivalry over access to the Aegean Sea and the Black Sea. The main immediate events that precipitated the war were the conflicts over Caffa and Tanais in the northern Black Sea, control of passage through the Bosporus straits—whence the conflict received its name—and the seizure of Chios and Phocaea by the Genoese.

== Historical background ==
In March 1261, the Republic of Genoa and the Byzantine Empire concluded the Treaty of Nymphaeum. The treaty was an offensive alliance against the Republic of Venice, whose naval might alone prevented the Byzantine from completing their long-held ambition to recover Constantinople from the moribund Latin Empire. Genoa, which had recently lost in a colonial conflict against Venice in Acre, was eager for a revanche, and enticed with extensive commercial privileges, including the opening of the Black Sea trade. Founding trade colonies at Caffa (modern Feodosia) and in the Empire of Trebizond, the Genoese soon achieved commercial hegemony in the Black Sea, and control of the northern termini of the great commercial highways leading to inner Asia. Among other reasons, the Black Sea trade was vital for both Genoa and Venice as a source of grain; the burgeoning populations of both cities were reliant on overseas imports.

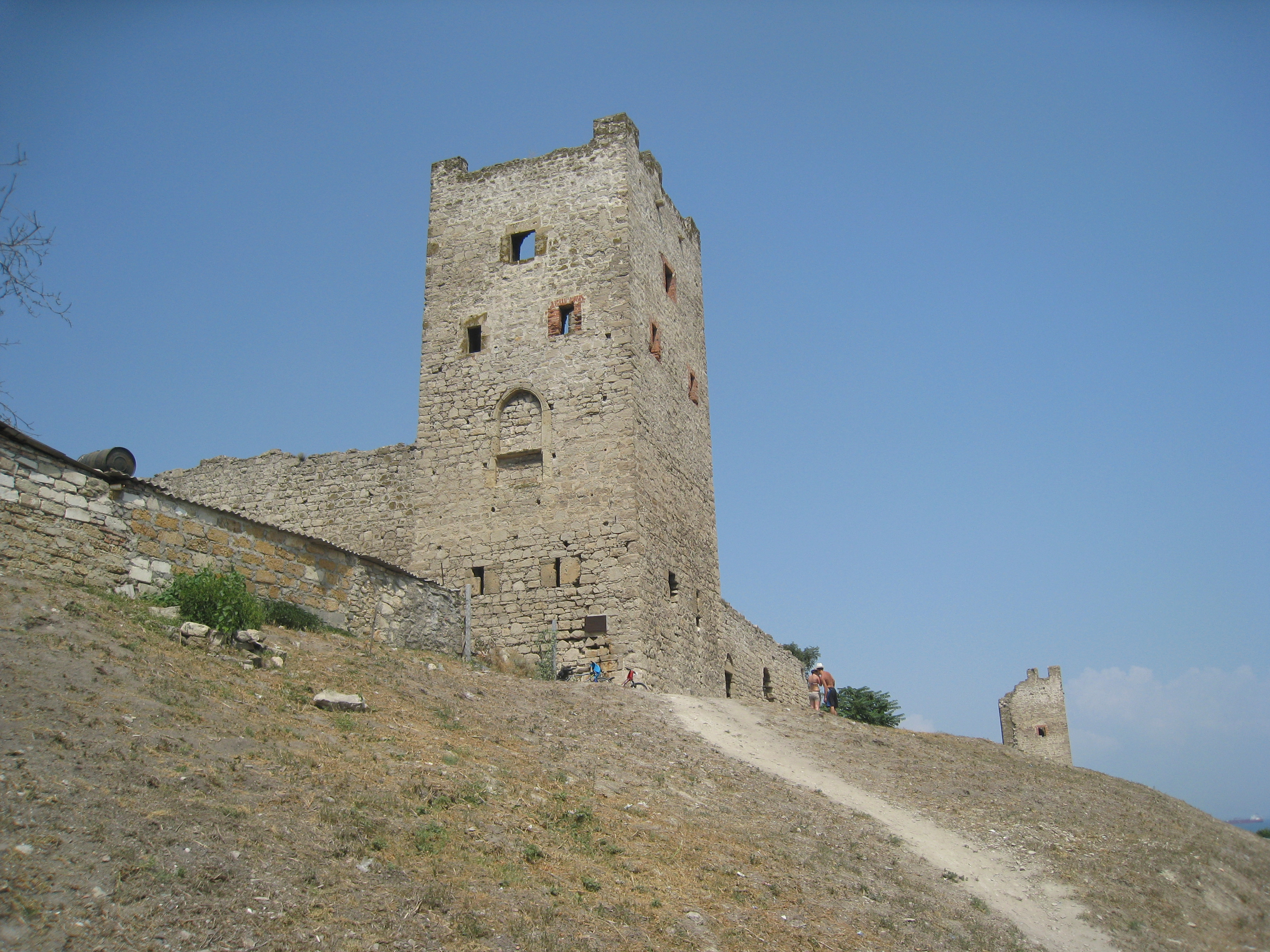
Tower of the Genoese fortifications in Caffa

The two states' commercial rivalry led to the so-called "War of Curzola" in 1296–1299, which ended in the Treaty of Milan without a clear victor: Genoa retained her ascendancy in the Black Sea but was unable to completely exclude the Venetians from it. During the war, the Venetians had operated in the Black Sea, and even sacked the Genoese colony of Pera (Galata), which then lacked fortifications; but Venetian efforts to establish themselves in the region had come relatively late, and eventually led to clashes with the pre-existing Genoese commercial colonies, as happened in Trebizond in 1327–1328 and in Tanais in 1341, before all Italian merchants were expelled in 1343 by the Golden Horde under Khan Jani Beg. The Venetians could count, up to that moment, on a strong commercial presence in the Crimea in the city of Soldaia, which, however, in the first half of the fourteenth century, was struggling to survive due to ruthless competition with the Genoese merchants in Caffa. The Golden Horde's attacks on Caffa from 1344 on caused a brief rapprochement: both states imposed an embargo on the Horde, and Venetians were allowed access to Caffa. In 1346, however, the Venetians negotiated renewed access to Tanais for themselves alone, provoking the ire of the Genoese merchants in Caffa, who engaged in reprisals against their Venetian rivals. The Venetian Senate immediately prohibited its merchants from entering the Black Sea, and declined a Genoese demand to restore access for Venetian merchants to Caffa, provided they stopped trading with Tanais.

Further south, both Genoa and Venice benefited from the decline and enfeeblement of the Byzantine Empire. The Treaty of Nymphaeum resulted in the establishment of a Genoese merchant colony of Pera just across the Golden Horn from the Byzantine capital, Constantinople, which progressively attracted all commerce away from the latter and became a state within a state, independent of Byzantine authority. The Byzantine emperors also awarded the Genoese Zaccaria family the lucrative alum mines of Phocaea, and even joined Genoa in its war against Venice. The Byzantines were not included in the Treaty of Milan, however, and were left to fight against Venice alone, leading to the conclusion of a humiliating treaty in 1302. Seizing the opportunity, the Zaccaria seized the island of Chios in 1304, holding it until reconquered by the Byzantines in 1329.

In 1346, the Genoese armed a fleet funded by private contractors and led by Simone Vignoso. Its aim was ostensibly to assist repel a Golden Horde siege of Caffa, but in reality it was meant to counter possible Venetian moves in the Aegean Sea, where a fleet led by Humbert II of Viennois and supported by Venice was active as part of the Second Smyrniote Crusade. Humbert intended to obtain Chios as a base for the Crusade, but was pre-empted by Vignoso, who attacked and captured the island and Phocaea as well. Both now came under the rule of a joint stock company, the Maona, with the participation of both private contractors and the Genoese state.

This action gave the Genoese strategic bases in the western Aegean to counterbalance the long-established Venetian domains in the south and east, but provoked the ire of both the Venetian doge, Andrea Dandolo, and the Byzantines, although the latter were for the moment embroiled in a debilitating civil war. The subsequent attempts by Emperor John VI Kantakouzenos to shake off Genoese influence and revive the Imperial fleet backfired: in a brief conflict in 1348–1349, the Genoese of Pera captured the newly rebuilt Imperial fleet, blockaded the Byzantine capital, and gave them de facto control over the passage of the Bosporus strait into the Black Sea.

== Diplomatic preparations for war ==
According to the contemporary Byzantine historian Nikephoros Gregoras, the Genoese intended to establish a monopoly on the Black Sea trade, excluding their Venetian rivals entirely from the region. The recent Genoese acquisitions in the Aegean, and their defeat of Kantakouzenos' attempt to curb their power, worried the Venetians, while also pushing the humiliated Byzantine emperor to turn to them for assistance in rolling back the Genoese gains. Some first skirmishes between Venetians and Genoese are recorded as early as 1347/8, after the Venetians returned to Tanais in violation of their previous agreement with the Genoese. Venice was preoccupied for most of the 1340s with its rivalry with Louis I of Hungary over control of Dalmatia, exacerbated by the revolt of Zara (Zadar), the chief Venetian possession in Dalmatia. The conclusion of an eight-year peace with Hungary in August 1348 left Venice free to deal with Genoa. During 1349, the Venetians also worked to secure support from, or at least good relations with, various potentates in northern Italy: Ubertino I da Carrara of Padua, Mastino II della Scala of Verona, Ludovico I Gonzaga of Mantua, and Luchino Visconti of Milan. In September 1349, the Venetian government also concluded a five-year truce with the Byzantines.

By early 1349, the savi agli ordini, Venice's board of naval commissioners, was charged with examining relations with Genoa. A conscription was imposed, and wood began to be gathered for the oncoming conflict. These preparations could not long remain secret, and in April the Doge of Genoa, Giovanni da Murta, sent a letter to Dandolo offering negotiations, and asking the Venetian fleet that was then being prepared for the East to assist the Genoese in case of attack by either the Byzantines or the Turks. It is unclear how sincere or disingenuous this proposal was, but even though it was joined by papal appeal for peace on 24 November 1349, it could not halt the slide to war, as both Venice and Genoa sought only to gain time and complete their preparations. Informal hostilities began in spring 1350, when a Genoese fleet prevented Venetian merchant vessels from reaching Tanais. The Venetians complained to Pope Clement VI, who could only helplessly respond that he would try to ensure that the captured goods would be returned.

The imminent conflict between Genoa and Venice also hampered papal plans for a new crusade to secure Smyrna against the Aydinid Turks; the Venetians were willing to contribute ships to the anti-Turkish league, but in April 1350 they demanded that the Genoese also participate in any such league. In July 1350, the distinguished Venetian statesman Marino Faliero, who had been a member of the naval board and at least one commission examining relations with Genoa, was named ambassador to Genoa, in hopes of averting the imminent conflict. He was recalled after only a few days, leaving only his secretary to continue with the mission, after news—which proved to be false—arrived in Venice that Venetian citizens had been killed by the Genoese in the Black Sea. Faliero was not replaced, making war inevitable.

== Course of the war ==
=== Initial clashes ===
On 6 August 1350, Venice declared war on Genoa. On the same day, a compulsory loan to finance the fleet was decreed. Marco Ruzzini was elected Captain General of the Sea, and set sail at the end of August for Greece with 35 galleys. Both cities had suffered heavy losses because of the Black Death—which had come to Europe with ships from Caffa in 1348—that had depleted their citizenry: Genoa lost about 30,000 of its 60,000–70,000 inhabitants, while Venice went from 120,000 in 1338 to about 65,000 in 1351. According to the historian Frederic C. Lane, the remaining male citizen population did not suffice for manning any more than 25 galleys, meaning that the Venetian government had to resort to conscription in Dalmatia and its Greek possessions to fill out its fleet's ranks. In addition, the conscription of the Venetian citizens proved unpopular, and many extricated themselves by hiring substitutes.

The result was that the Venetian fleet was manned by crews that were both inexperienced an indisciplined, a fact that became evident at the first battle of the war: on 17 September, Ruzzini's fleet attacked a Genoese fleet of 14 merchant galleys under Nicola di Magnerri at Castro (Kastri), near the Venetian colony of Negroponte (Euboea). The Venetians captured ten ships, but the inexperience and indiscipline of the conscripted crews, which abandoned the battle to plunder the captured vessels, allowed the remainder to escape to Chios. This provoked outrage at Venice, but the Venetian Senate failed to pursue the matter, realising that many of the crews were attracted by the promise of pay and booty, and were likely to mutiny if they were denied that. Ruzzini then sailed to Pera, where he conducted a brief and unsuccessful siege, before conducting a foray into the Black Sea. On his return home, he was welcomed with honours. In the meantime, however, the four galleys he had allowed to escape joined with five more Genoese ships at Chios, and, under the command of Filippo Doria, they launched a successful surprise attack on the city of Negroponte (Chalkis) in October, and burned its harbour, though the citadel resisted successfully. The local Venetian bailo (governor), Tommaso Viadro, fled the field, and was later put on trial for cowardice in Venice; he only escaped execution due to the intervention of the Doge. Neither Viadro nor Ruzzini were selected again for military commands.

=== Venetian alliances and Genoese reaction ===
In spring 1351, a papal appeal to the two combatants to cease the conflict had no effect, as did a letter by the celebrated poet Petrarch to the Doge of Venice, enjoining the two states "to lay down their uncivilized weapons, to unite their souls and their flags and to give each other the kiss of peace". Instead, the conflict expanded across the Mediterranean. The first actions of the war had demonstrated to Venice the need for much larger forces, and thus the need for allies, to make up for its own diminished human resources. As a result, Venice turned to two of Genoa's rivals: the Byzantines and the Crown of Aragon. An attempt to secure the support of another Italian naval power, the Republic of Pisa, was rebuffed. The Aragonese had been at loggerheads with the Genoese over Sardinia, and despite previous confrontations with the Venetians over the activities of the Catalan rulers of the Duchy of Athens in Greece, King Peter IV of Aragon and his influential commander, Bernat II de Cabrera, proved willing to enter into an alliance with Venice. The treaty, concluded at Perpignan on 16 January 1351, was scheduled to last at first until 29 September, after which it would be renewed for four years. Neither party was to sign a separate peace. Aragon undertook to equip a fleet of 18 galleys for operations in the Tyrrhenian Sea against a monthly payment of 12,000 florins, two thirds of which was to be paid by Venice, in exchange for one third of all spoils. A further 12 Aragonese galleys were to be rented by Venice.

Kantakouzenos proved less easy to convince: the Venetians sent an ambassador, Antonio Bragadin, to the emperor already in 1350, but the latter was preoccupied with a war against the Serbian Empire and refused to join another conflict. In spring 1351, the Venetians sent a fleet under Giovanni Dolfin to again attack Pera, but Kantakouzenos still hesitated, as he received reassurances from the Genoese. In response, the Venetians withdrew their ambassador from the Imperial court. Finally, the Byzantine emperor joined the war reportedly as a result of Genoese provocations, when the Genoese of Pera began catapulting rocks at Constantinople's walls. A treaty was concluded in May 1351, in which the emperor agreed to provide from 29 September 12 galleys for 10,776 hyperpyra per month, with Venice again providing two thirds of the sum. Further clauses stipulated the return of Imperial territories held by the Genoese. A Venetian fleet of 22 ships was sent under Niccolò Pisani to join the Byzantines and jointly besiege Pera.

On the other side of the conflict, Genoa tried in vain to dissuade both the Aragonese and the Byzantines from their alliance with Venice, arguing that Venice's promises were not to be trusted upon. With the conflict about to assume pan-Mediterranean dimensions, the Genoese government established a dedicated magistracy to run it, the Officium guerre Venetorum et Catalanorum. A forced loan of 300,000 liras was imposed on 25 November 1350, with its shareholders guaranteed an annual 10% interest rate. To pay for this, the proceeds from 22 taxes were repurposed. These measures allowed the Genoese to mobilize larger fleets: on 13 July 1351, sixty ships with 180 men on board each sailed from Genoa, under the command of Paganino Doria. Nevertheless, the Genoese were unable to repeat their maximum effort during the previous conflict, when they put a fleet of 165 galleys at sea.

In early 1351, the Genoese attacked the Duchy of the Archipelago, a Venetian ally in the Aegean, captured Duke John I Sanudo and his family, and plundered the island of Naxos. Soon after, the Genoese concluded a treaty with the Aydinid emir Khidr Bey which ensured the resupply of Chios from the Aydinid port of Ephesus. At the same time, the Genoese of Pera sought assistance from their Muslim neighbour, the Ottoman sultan Orhan. In exchange for the payment tribute—which in Ottoman eyes made Pera a vassal territory—Orhan pledged military support, and provided 1,000 archers to serve on board the Genoese fleet and to man the walls of Pera against the Venetian and Byzantine attacks. This began a Genoese–Ottoman alliance that would last until the Fall of Constantinople in 1453. While the Genoese secured trading privileges in Ottoman domains, and protection for Pera, the Ottomans gained an advantage that proved a crucial turning point for the history of Europe: Genoese ships allowed them to cross the Bosporus and begin their expansion into Europe.

=== Doria's expedition to Pera ===
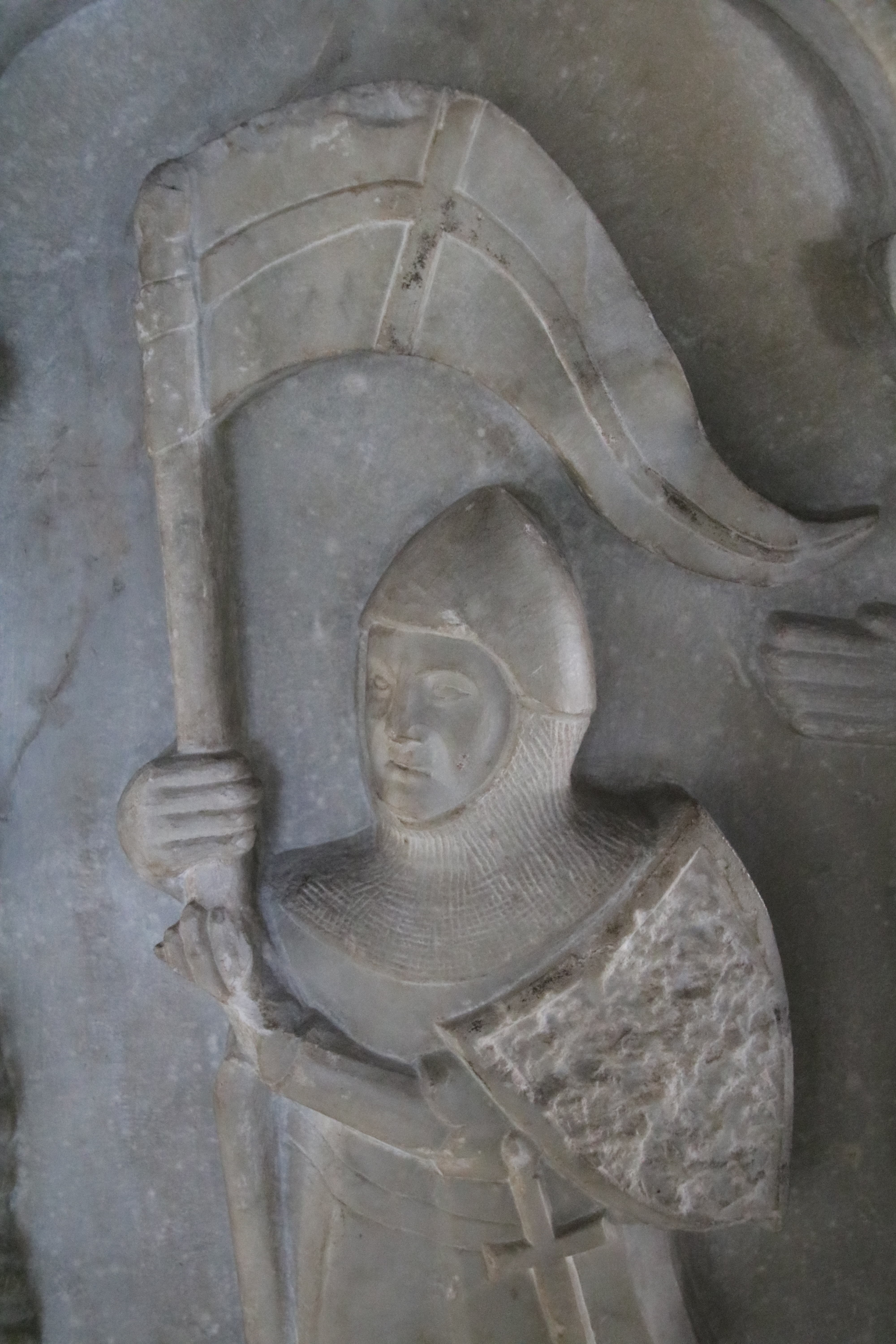
Genoese warrior, from the tombstone of Paganino Doria

Doria initially tried to seek out the Aragonese fleet in the waters around southern Italy and bring it to battle, but after failing to find them turned east, towards Pera. When Grimani heard of this, he abandoned the blockade of Pera and withdrew to Negroponte, abandoning the Byzantines, whose fleet was defeated by the Genoese of Pera on 28 July 1351. At Negroponte, Grimani scuttled his own ships to prevent them from being captured and helped man the fortifications with his men. There he was in turn besieged by Doria until he was forced to withdraw in the face of an Aragonese fleet of forty galleys under Pancrazio Giustinian and Pons di Santapau. The defence of Negroponte was assisted by the Catalans of the Duchy of Athens, who sent 300 cavalry and a large number of infantry to assist the Venetians. After the Genoese left, the Venetians refloated their scuttled ships.

Doria withdrew to Chios, where he replenished his forces and filled out his crews, and then sailed north. His fleet captured the island of Tenedos on the way. At the port of Heraclea in the Sea of Marmara, the Genoese sailors landed to take on supplies. Fighting erupted with the locals, after which the Genoese sacked the city. Kantakouzenos, forewarned of Doria's progress, ordered all his cities to look to their fortifications, withdrew his own ships behind the protection of Constantinople's fortified harbour, and recalled his field army from Thrace. Thus, after the Genoese arrived at Pera, they found they could not achieve much. Despite receiving support from the neighbouring Turkish rulers—Sultan Orhan and Khidr Bey—the Genoese did not press their advantage, as their supplies were limited and their objectives unclear, while Kantakouzenos awaited the arrival of his allies behind the strong fortifications of Constantinople. In November, however, the Genoese sacked the Byzantine city of Sozopolis (Sozopol) in the Black Sea.

=== Battle of the Bosporus and exit of Byzantium from the war ===
The stalemate was broken early in the next year, when the allied fleet arrived from the Aegean, having suffered some losses to storms. Doria tried to sally forth and engage the Aragonese and Genoese before they could join the Byzantines, but contrary winds prevented him from doing so until 13 February 1352. The two fleets met near the Princes' Islands, southeast of the entrance to the Bosporus. The encounter happened late in the day, leaving just two hours of light, but the Aragonese commander, Santapau, insisted on fighting. Doria was unable to prevent the union of the Venetians and Aragonese with the small Byzantine fleet, putting him and a distinct numerical disadvantage, with only 60 or 64 ships against 89 or 90 allied vessels. The ensuing Battle of the Bosporus took place in the narrow strait and was a disorganized and bloody affair that dragged well into the night. The Venetians and Aragonese withdrew after losing 23 ships and admiral Pancrazio Giustinian, leaving the field to the Genoese, who thus gained the nominal victory, despite their own heavy losses of 16 vessels. Both sides spent the next couple of weeks recuperating, but when Doria offered battle on 3 March 1352, the allies refused to sail out. Doria then anchored on the Asian side of the Bosporus, welcomed by Orhan, until the allied fleet left in April.

Strategically, the Genoese emerged as the victors of this phase of the conflict, having managed to thwart the allies' attempt to dislodge them from their choke-hold on the entrance to the Black Sea. Abandoned by their allies, the Byzantines were forced to come to terms with the Genoese. In a treaty signed on 6 May 1352, Kantakouzenos ended the war with Genoa, prohibited Venetian and Aragonese ships from entering his ports, recognized the full possession of Pera by the Genoese, and renewed the privileges of the Treaty of Nymphaeum. The victorious fleet of Doria returned home to Genoa in August, but the heavy losses suffered meant that no triumphal welcome was staged. At the same time, the Genoese concluded an offensive military alliance against Venice with Louis of Hungary, with a duration of two years.

=== Conflict in Sardinia ===
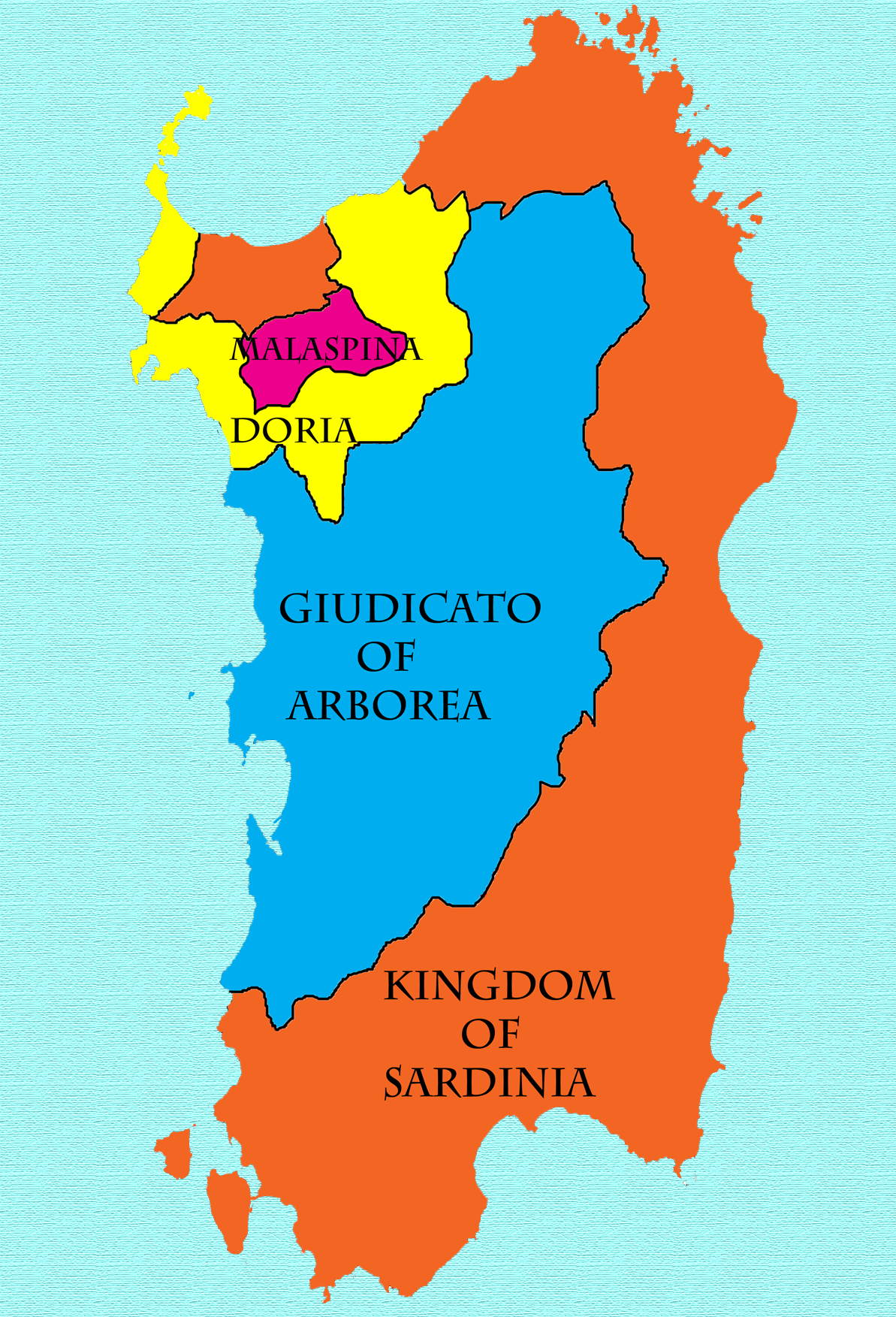
Political map of Sardinia in 1324, with the Aragonese Kingdom of Sardinia and the surviving local lordships

With Byzantium's exit from the war, the focus of the conflict shifted to the Western Mediterranean. Peter IV had long seen Genoese influence on Sardinia as an obstacle to his aims to centralize Aragonese rule over it and Corsica. As part of his preparations for a campaign there to solidify control against both the Genoese and restive local lords, in June 1352 the King of Aragon obtained the right to occupy the castle of Osilo during wartime from its Malaspina lords, and in January 1353 secured the submission of a few of the local members of the Genoese Doria family by recognizing their local possessions. Other Sardinian nobles however were not so easily won over, including the Judge of Arborea, Marianus IV; on 15 February 1353—with the support of Marianus IV, who was also in talks with Genoa—the town of Alghero on the northwestern part of Sardinia submitted to Genoese rule.

In response, Peter IV appointed Bernat de Cabrera as his captain-general for the Sardinian expedition. At the head of a fleet of 46 galleys, 5 cogs and 6 other vessels, Cabrera sailed from Minorca on 18 August 1352, reaching Alghero seven days later. Cabrera arranged for a siege of the city, under the Aragonese governor of Sardinia, Riambau de Cobrera, and sailed south to meet with a Venetian fleet of 20 galleys, under Niccolò Pisani, which had arrived at Cagliari. On 27 August, at the Bay of Porto Conte, just off Alghero, the allied Aragonese–Venetian fleet inflicted a heavy defeat on a Genoese fleet of 55 ships under Antonio Grimaldi. Three days later, Alghero surrendered to Cabrera's forces. The Genoese setbacks in Sardinia caused the Doge of Genoa, Giovanni II Valente, to resign his office. As internal tensions in Genoa raised the spectre of renewed conflict between the Guelph and Ghibelline factions, on 9 October 1353 Genoa submitted to the rule of a foreign prince who could both protect the city and finance the war effort: Giovanni Visconti, Archbishop and Lord of Milan.

The Aragonese conquest proved precarious: the local governor had to suppress a Doria revolt in October, and in the next year, the city was lost again and had to be besieged in June 1354. It was only with the capitulation of Marianus IV of Arborea in November 1354, that the city definitively came under Aragonese control, followed by the deportation of its inhabitants to the Aragonese heartlands and the Balearic Islands, and its settlement with Catalan colonists. The Genoese launched a privately funded attempt to recover the city in 1354 with a fleet of 15 galleys under Filippo Doria. However, rather than attempt an attack that was unlikely to succeed, and needing to repay his investors, Doria instead diverted his fleet to Tripoli, which he sacked and held for a few months.

=== Doria's Adriatic raid and the Battle of Sapienza ===
Venice reacted to the Visconti takeover of Genoa by forging alliances with the northern Italian lords: Ludovico I Gonzaga of Mantua, Cangrande II della Scala of Verona, Giovanni Manfredi of Faenza, and Aldobrandino III d'Este of Ferrara, as well as Charles IV of Bohemia. In early 1354 (though other accounts put it as early as November 1353), Petrarch, who had good relations with Doge Andrea Dandolo was sent by the Visconti to Venice to negotiate an end to the conflict, but without success. In the same year, the Genoese equipped a fleet of 24 galleys under Paganino Doria, a far cry from the large fleets launched during the start of the war and likely indicative of the exhaustion of Genoa's human and financial resources by this stage.

Doria led his fleet west and even briefly threatened Barcelona, before turning back towards Sardinia and Alghero, while avoiding a direct confrontation with the Venetian–Aragonese fleet. Instead, he resolved to challenge Venice by sailing into the Adriatic Sea, traditionally seen by Venice as its particular area of influence, being known as the "Gulf of Venice". Doria's fleet raided the Dalmatian islands of Lesina (Hvar) and Curzola (Korčula), and on 16 August 1354 sacked Parenzo (Poreč) in Istria, from where the relics of saints Eleutherius and Maurus of Parentium were taken and brought to Genoa, where they were deposited at the church of San Matteo. The Venetians feared that Doria would attack Venice next, and placed a heavy chain to bar entrance to the San Marco basin, while compulsory loan was levied, the population capable of bearing arms was assessed, and a force of 300 men was mobilized from each of the city's six districts and placed under the overall command of Paolo Loredan. Rather than attack Venice, Doria led his fleet back out of the Adriatic and east to Chios, forcing the Venetian fleet under Pisani to abandon Sardinia and follow him. Despite enjoying qualitative and numerical superiority, however, Pisani did not attack Doria at Chios, giving the latter the chance to obtain reinforcements.

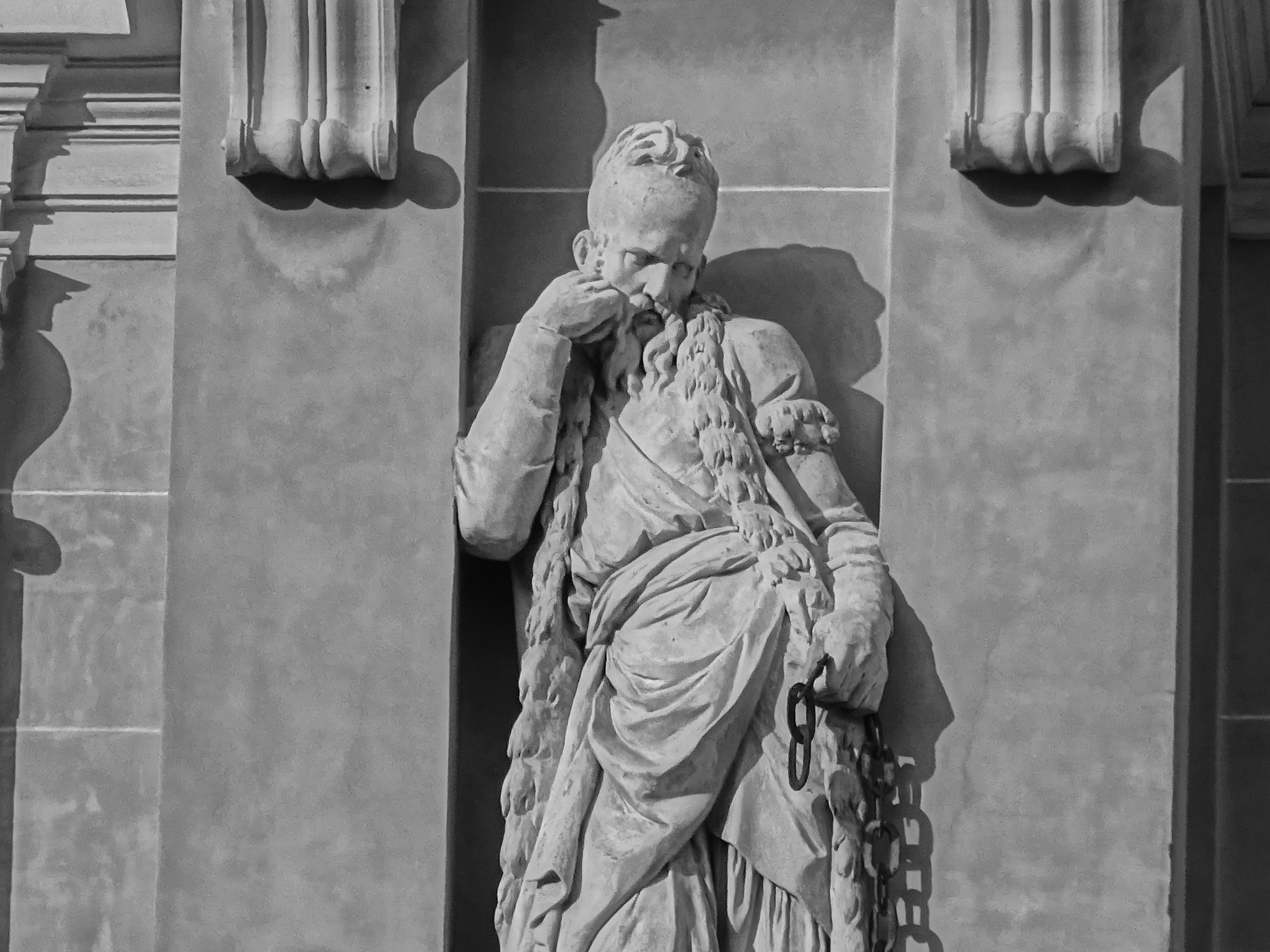
Statue representing Pisani as a captive after Sapienza, from the 18th-century façade of the Doge's Palace of Genoa

In the meantime, Pisani received messages ordering him to the Venetian outpost at Coron (Koroni) in southwestern Greece. According to some accounts, there he received instructions to avoid confrontation with the Genoese, as they were thought to have by now a superior fleet, and as negotiations for ending the conflict were ongoing, but other sources do not mention anything of this kind. Pisani in mid-October left Coron and sailed to the natural anchorage of Porto Longo, at the nearby offshore island of Sapienza. There the Venetian admiral awaited the arrival of the Genoese fleet, which would have to pass by the area on its way back to west, placing part of his ships to block the entrance of the bay, and anchoring the rest at the shore. On 3 November 1354 Doria arrived with 35 galleys, but the Venetians did not sail out to give battle. On the next day, Doria sent part of his ships to attack the entrance of the harbour; these broke through the Venetian resistance and forced the entire Venetian fleet to surrender. Over 4,000 Venetians were killed, and 5,400 taken prisoner, Grimani among them. While Doria returned to a hero's welcome in Genoa, Pisani, soon released by the Genoese, found himself before a tribunal, where he was accused of disobeying his instructions and negligence in command. He was condemned on 5 August 1355 to imprisonment and a fine of 1000 pounds, as well as a prohibition of further military command. He died soon after.

=== Peace treaty ===
Both sides were by now exhausted. While Genoa was for the moment victorious, its Visconti masters wanted peace. When Archbishop Giovanni Visconti died, his nephews and successors, Matteo II, Galeazzo II, and Bernabò lacked any interest in prosecuting the war further. Venice was increasingly pressured on its Dalmatian frontier by King Louis of Hungary, while the death of Doge Andrea Dandolo, who had promoted an anti-Visconti league in northern Italy, was followed by the discovery of an abortive coup by Grandenigo's successor, Marino Faliero, supported by discontented commoners, in April 1355.

With the mediation of the Visconti lords, a peace was signed on 1 June 1355, which included the release of all prisoners, the compensation of losses, and the submission of all disputes and damages claimed by each side since 1299 to arbitration. Furthermore, both sides agreed to refrain from trading with Tanais for three years—effectively forcing the Venetians to trade via Genoese Caffa. A deadline of 60 days was stipulated for ratification, with a sum of 100,000 gold florins deposited as guarantee. As the historian Steven Epstein commented, "Basically, the treaty restored peace and established mechanisms for settling future disputes; neither side won anything worthy of mention".

== Aftermath ==
Louis I of Hungary was left out of the treaty with Genoa, and demanded the surrender of Dalmatia. The Hungarian ruler gained the support of the Patriarch of Aquileia and the Count of Gorizia and invaded Dalmatia and the Veneto, laying siege to the Venetian mainland stronghold of Treviso. Conversely, Venice's efforts to enlist the Lord of Padua, Francesco da Carrara, failed, as Padua provided aid to the Hungarians. While the Hungarians failed to take Venice's mainland strongholds around the Venetian Lagoon, they captured several Dalmatian cities. With the Hungarian king still encamped near their city, and afraid that Genoa might join him, the Venetians decided to make peace in early 1358, ceding Dalmatia to the Hungarians. A separate peace followed with Padua soon after. As the historian Dennis Romano comments, the involvement of Hungary and Padua in the Venetian–Genoese war was "in many respects a dry run" for the fourth Genoese–Venetian war, the so-called "War of Chioggia".

The peace treaty failed to resolve any of the deeper causes of the conflict, rooted in the commercial antagonism of the two Italian maritime powers. In 1358, after the three-year ban stipulated in the Treaty of Milan elapsed, Venice secured a renewal of its concession in Tanais by Khan Berdi Beg, Jani Beg's successor. At the same time, the Genoese began fortifying their scattered possessions along the Black Sea. In Genoa itself, Visconti rule scarcely outlived the end of the conflict, being overthrown in an uprising and resulting in the return of Simone Boccanegra to the city's dogeship, in November 1356. Boccanegra initially allied with Castile to continue the war with Aragon, but the financial strain of the conflict—almost all the Republic's income went to covering expenses or servicing the debt accumulated in the war—meant that Boccanegra soon sought a rapprochement with Aragon over Sardinia, while still promoting Genoese influence in Corsica, leading to a truce and an exchange of prisoners in 1360. While Venice's overseas empire was threatened by an uprising by its own colonists on its most important possession, Crete, in 1363–1364, its antagonism with Genoa soon extended to Cyprus. There the Genoese held possession of the port of Famagusta, but the Venetian merchant Federico Cornaro grew enormously wealthy, propping up the Lusignan kings of Cyprus with loans and acquiring Argos and Nauplia as a fief in Greece.

The true beneficiaries of the Genoese–Venetian conflict were the Ottoman Turks, who captured Gallipoli in 1355 and proceeded to rapidly expand into Byzantine Thrace and the rest of the Balkans, reducing the enfeebled Byzantine Empire to Constantinople and its environs. The rapid decline of Byzantium and strategic access to the Black Sea also provided the context for the War of Chioggia. In exchange for the grant of loans to the emperors, the Venetians required the island of Tenedos, strategically located at the entrance of the Dardanelles, as surety. In 1376, John V Palaiologos was compelled by the Venetians to hand over the island, but before this was carried out, the emperor was overthrown by his son, Andronikos IV, with the support of the Ottomans and the Genoese. Andronikos granted Tenedos to the Genoese, but the Venetians seized the island first, leading to the outbreak of hostilities with Genoa in 1378. The Genoese were again backed by Louis of Hungary and Padua, who had already engaged in a brief and fruitless conflict with the Venetians in 1372–1373, and concluded a new treaty with Aragon, promising to not assist the Sardinian rebels any longer, in order to keep the Aragonese fleet from aiding Venice. The war lasted until 1381, again without a decisive outcome. The allies captured Chioggia and threatened Venice itself with conquest, but the Venetians managed to recover and force a peace of exhaustion on the Genoese. Venice was forced to renounce possession of Tenedos and Treviso, but retained its independence and its colonial empire essentially intact, as did the Genoese. In the aftermath of the war, Genoa descended into civil strife again; coupled with the decline of the Black Sea trade, Genoa re-focused its attention to the Western Mediterranean, and stopped being Venice's rival for pre-eminence in the eastern Mediterranean.

== Sources ==
- Balard, Michel (2017). Gênes et la mer - Genova e il mare. Vol. II. Genoa: Società Ligure di Storia Patria. ISBN 978-88-97099-42-0.
  - Balard, Michel (2017a). "L’empire génois au Moyen Age". In Balard (2017), pp. 491–507.
  - Balard, Michel (2017b). "1261. Genova nel mondo: il trattato di Ninfeo". In Balard (2017), pp. 529–549.
  - Balard, Michel (2017c). "La lotta contro Genova". In Balard (2017), pp. 575–645. (originally published in 1997 as "La lotta contro Genova", Storia di Venezia dalle origini alla caduta della Serenissima. Vol. III, La formazione dello stato patrizio, pp. 87–126)
- Dotson, John E. (2002). "Venice, Genoa and Control of the Seas in the Thirteenth and Fourteenth Centuries". In Hattenforf, John B.; Unger, Richard W. (eds.). War at Sea in the Middle Ages and the Renaissance. Woodbridge, Suffolk: Boydell & Brewer. pp. 119–136. ISBN 0-85115-903-6.
- Epstein, Steven A. (1996). Genoa and the Genoese, 958–1528. Chapel Hill, N.C.: University of North Carolina Press. ISBN 978-0-8078-4992-7.
- İnalcık, Halil (1979). "The Question of the Closing of the Black Sea under the Ottomans". Αρχείον Πόντου. 35: 74–110.
- Lane, Frederic Chapin (1973). Venice, A Maritime Republic. Baltimore, Maryland: Johns Hopkins University Press. ISBN 0-8018-1445-6.
- Musarra, Antonio (2020). Il Grifo e il Leone: Genova e Venezia in lotta per il Mediterraneo (in Italian). Bari and Rome: Editori Laterza. ISBN 978-88-581-4072-7.
- Nicol, Donald M. (1993) [1972]. The Last Centuries of Byzantium, 1261–1453 (Second ed.). Cambridge: Cambridge University Press. ISBN 978-0-521-43991-6.
- Nuti, Giovanni (1992). "DORIA, Pagano". Dizionario Biografico degli Italiani (in Italian). Vol. 41: Donaggio–Dugnani. Rome: Institute of the Italian Encyclopaedia. ISBN 978-88-12-00032-6.
- Ravegnani, Giorgio (2017). Il traditore di Venezia: Vita di Marino Falier doge (in Italian). Bari and Rome: Editori Laterza. ISBN 978-88-581-2715-5.
- Romano, Dennis (2024). Venice: The Remarkable History of the Lagoon City. Oxford and New York: Oxford University Press. ISBN 978-0-19085998-5.
- Setton, Kenneth M. (1975). "The Catalans in Greece, 1311–1388". In Setton, Kenneth M.; Hazard, Harry W. (eds.). A History of the Crusades, Volume III: The Fourteenth and Fifteenth Centuries. Vol. 3. Madison and London: University of Wisconsin Press. pp. 167–224. ISBN 0-299-06670-3.
- Setton, Kenneth M. (1976). The Papacy and the Levant (1204–1571), Volume I: The Thirteenth and Fourteenth Centuries. Vol. 1. Philadelphia: The American Philosophical Society. ISBN 0-87169-114-0.
