= Murta =

Murta may refer to:

== People ==
- Murta (singer) (born 1998), Portuguese singer-songwriter
- André Gaspar Murta (born 1994), Portuguese tennis player
- Inês Murta (born 1997), Portuguese tennis player
- Jack Murta (born 1943), Canadian politician
- Vítor Murta (born 1979), Portuguese footballer

== Plants ==
- Schumannianthus dichotomus, a plant known in Bengali as the murta
- Ugni molinae, a Chilean shrub known in Spanish as the murta

== Other uses ==
- Murta (Genoa), a village in the outskirts of the Italian city Genoa
- Murta, a village in Dobreşti Commune, Dolj County, Romania

== See also ==
- Myrtus (myrtle), known as murta in Portuguese
