= Bolzaneto =

Coordinates: 44°27′32″N 8°54′8″E

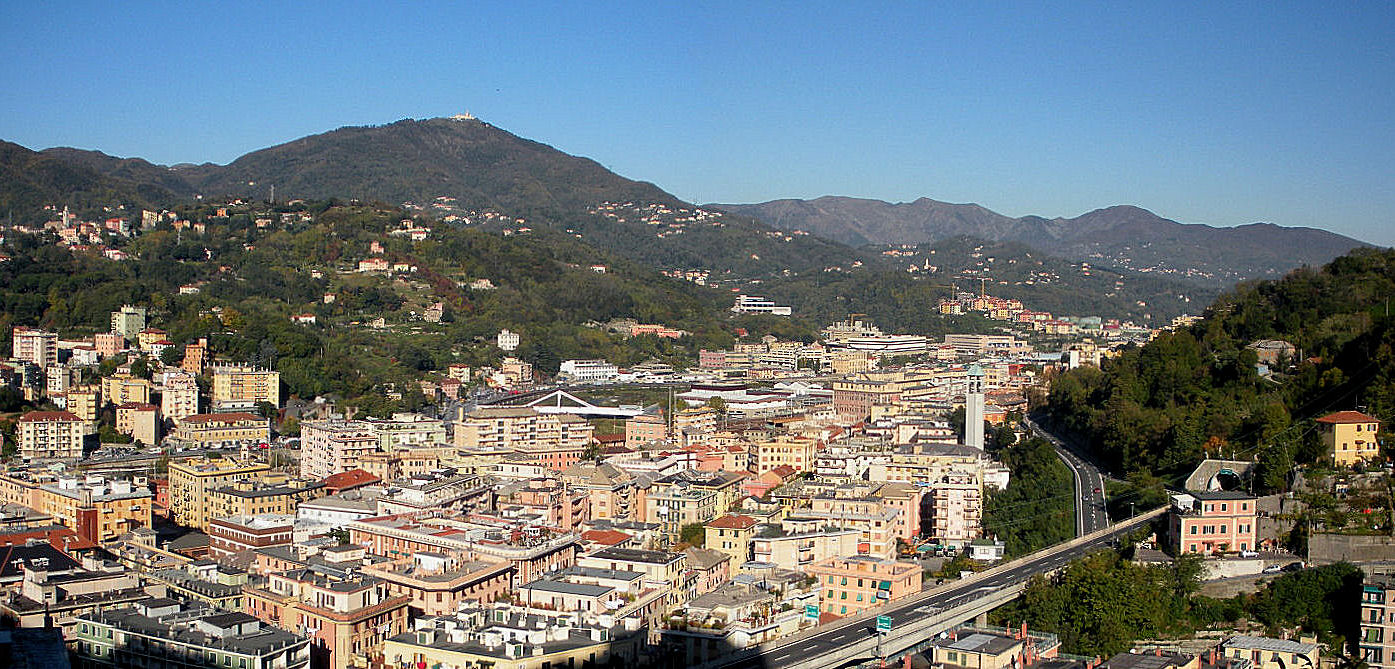
View of Bolzaneto

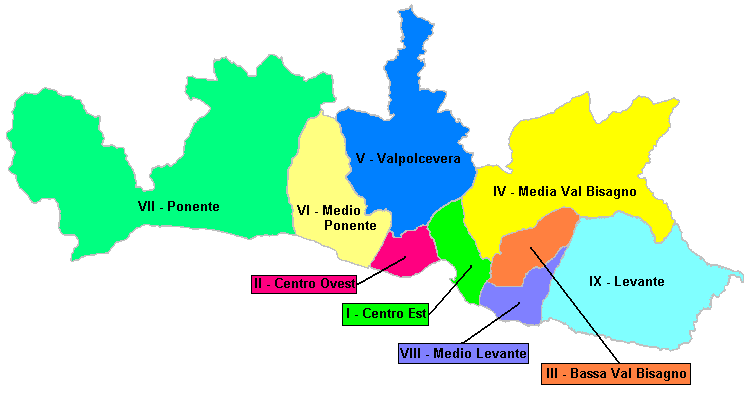
Bolzaneto is included in the Valpolcevera Municipality that is the dark blue area on the map.

Bolzaneto is a quarter of the city of Genoa, in northwest Italy, and is part of the Municipality Valpolcevera of Genoa.

== Geography ==
Bolzaneto was once a hamlet located outside of the city limits in the Polcevera valley, but in the recent centuries it became an industrial area. Today it is a suburb of Genoa, surrounded by many small industries and business firms, but offering excellent views of the city and harbor. The Bolzaneto district includes the hamlets of Morego, San Biagio, Brasile, Cremeno, Geminiano and Murta. The district has a population of 15,239 inhabitants (as of December 31, 2006).

On the mountains behind Bolzaneto, at the left side of Polcevera valley, are two fortresses, which are part of the external fortresses of Genoa: the “Fort Diamante” and the fort named “Fratello Minore”. At the right side of valley, on Mount Figogna (804 m), is the Shrine of N.S. della Guardia, from where you have a wide view of the valley. The Shrine, located in the municipality of Ceranesi can be reached by the provincial road No 52.

== History ==
Until the mid-19th century Bolzaneto was a small village on the left side of the river Polcevera, near a wide bend of this. At the beginning of the second millennium the village was a simple group of houses around the church of N.S. della Neve (Our Lady of Snow). The town had been subject to the civil and religious authority of Brasile until 1854, when the municipal headquarters and the parish were transferred to Bolzaneto.

Brasile is now a little hamlet on the hill behind Bolzaneto, but in the Middle Ages people lived there who had important roles in the government of the Republic of Genoa. Near Bolzaneto, then on the right side of Polcevera stream, was located the monastery of San Francesco alla Chiappetta, built at the end of the 13th century.

In the 18th century, the Republic of Genoa, allied to France, was involved in War of Austrian Succession. In 1746 the valley, Valpolcevera, was occupied by an Austrian-Piedmontese army, led by the General Botta Adorno, which came up to Genoa, from where he was expelled after the popular revolt of December 5, 1746, set up with the legendary episode of Balilla.

Starting on April 11, 1747, another Austrian army Siege of Genoa (1747) unsuccessfully besieged Genoa. The Austrians, coming from the North through the Apennine, again occupied the whole Valpolcevera. The prolonged occupation led to looting and destruction of the homes and villages in the region. In the weeks that followed, an army of volunteers of Valpolcevera, supported by regular troops of the Republic of Genoa began a counter-offensive, forcing the evacuation on July 9, 1747, from the Valpocevera of the Austrian army, leaving behind much of the area in a state of devastation.

The topography of the place had a great change in the mid-19th century, when the Genoa-Turin railway was built. It was necessary to correct and dam the frequently-flooding Polcevera river, eliminating the existing bend. A new path for the torrent bed was dug for about 500 m, by cutting the base of the Murta hill upstream the monastery of San Francesco (that so passed from right to left bank of the stream) and an embankment on the left side was built, on which the railway runs. Gradually many houses were built up in the old stream-bed, thus forming the present town of Bolzaneto.

In the second half of the 19th century, the area, formerly agricultural, became industrial, with the establishment of several companies (the most important were the Foundries Bruzzo and the soap factory Lo Faro). In 1926, together with other 18 municipalities, Bolzaneto joined the municipality of Genoa, to form the so-called Great Genoa.

After the Second World War, the steel crisis led to the closure of Foundries Bruzzo (1957) and in a portion of these areas, near S. Biagio, was built the ERG refinery (then closed in 1988, also as a result of the growing attention of people to environmental aspects). In this area where there is now a large shopping center and a new residential district. Like this, other areas, abandoned since 1960, due to the closure of factories, many small industries and businesses firms have now replaced them.

Close to Bolzaneto there is a police barracks that in 2001 was in the international headlines, when there many protesters (arrested during the disturbances occurred at the G8 meeting in the city of Genoa) were imprisoned. Some police officers were accused and convicted of organised brutality on a large scale.

Since 2005, the quarter of Morego is home to the headquarters of the Italian Institute of Technology (IIT).

== Main sights ==
=== Castle of Bolzaneto ===
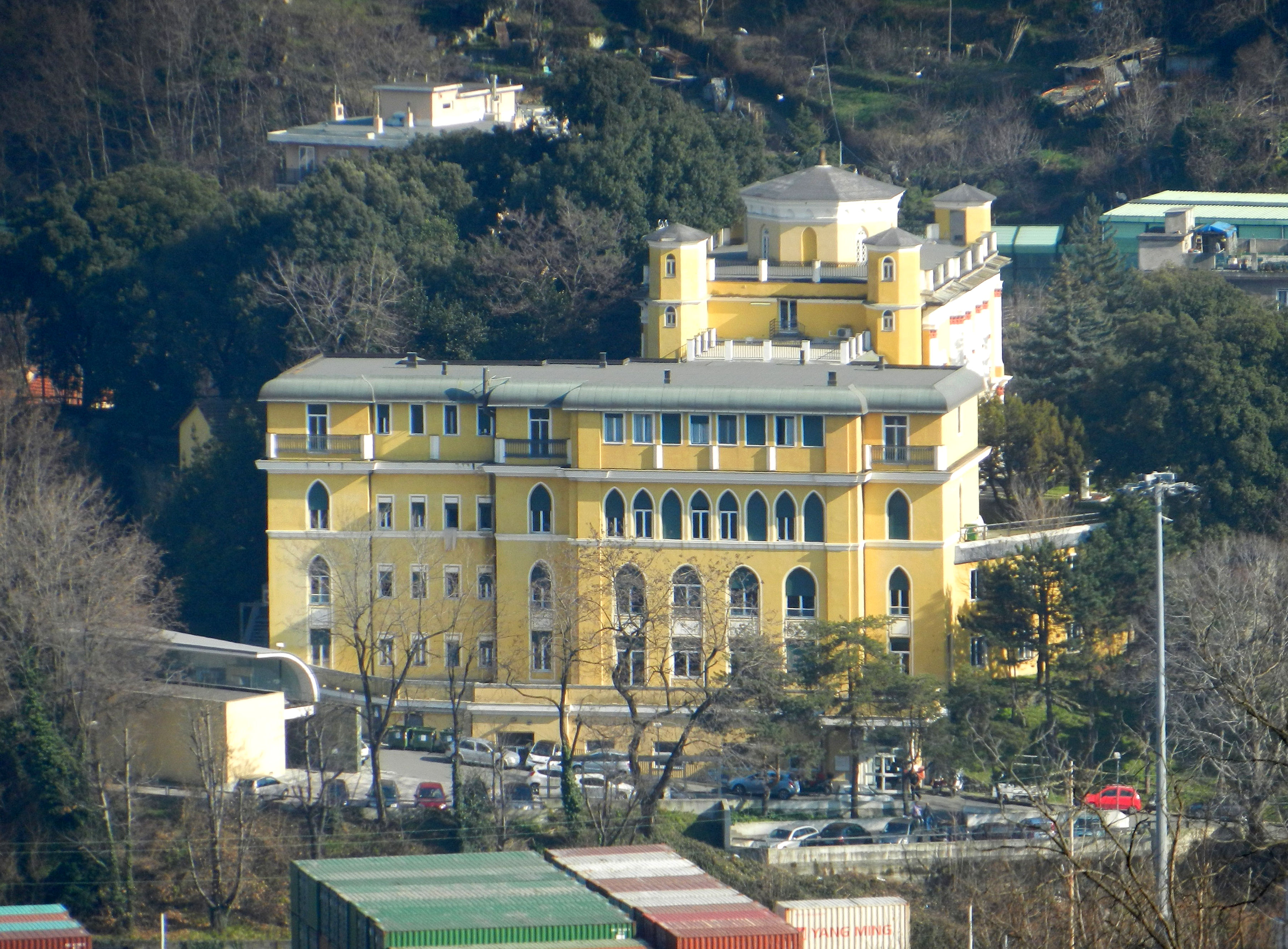
Castle of Bolzaneto, former Villa Pastorino

The castle was a fortress built by the noble Genoese family of Adorno. It was destroyed in the 14th century by the mercenary troops of the Visconti, being rebuilt by the Republic of Genoa in 1380. The castle was also involved in the fighting of 1746-1747 during the War of Austrian Succession, and also became the headquarters of the Podestà (major) of Polcevera Valley. At the beginning of the 20th century, it was abandoned as military stronghold and transformed into a residential villa, then into a hospital, until 1990. Currently it is used as a home for the elderly and hospice.

=== Fortresses ===
The Fortresses called "I Due Fratelli" (The Two Brothers) were two fortresses said, referring to their position, "Major Brother" and "Minor Brother". They were built by the Savoy in the first half of nineteenth century, after the annexation of the Republic of Genoa to Kingdom of Sardinia, established by Congress of Vienna in 1814. The first fortress, shaped as a simple tower, was demolished in 1932 to create an antiaircraft position, the second one (Minor Brother) is still intact and overlooks the valley from the top of Mount Spino (622 m). The "Fort Diamante", on the top of mount bearing the same name, has been built in the 18th century, then completed and modified in the first half of the 19th century.

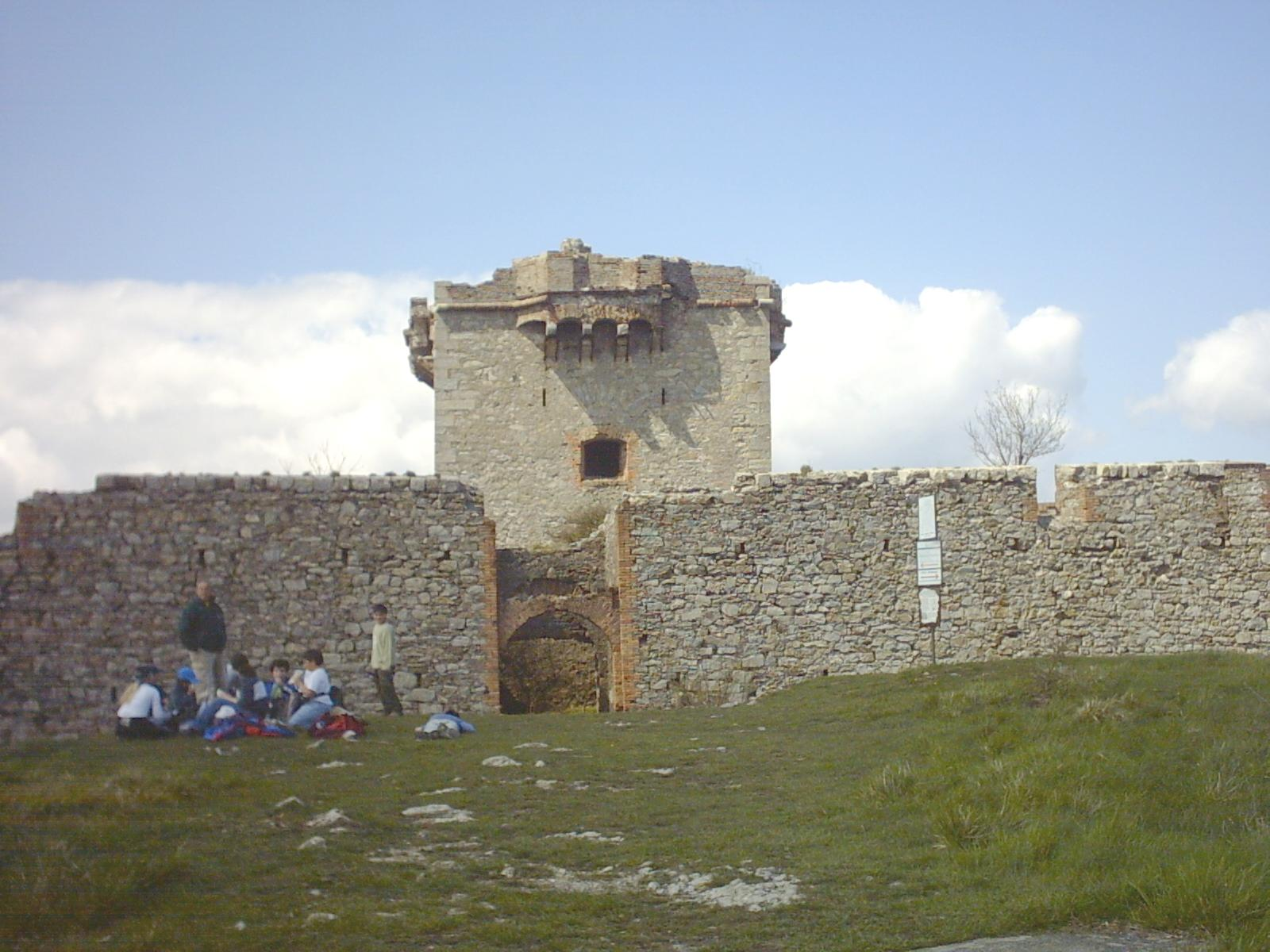
Fort called "Fratello Minore".

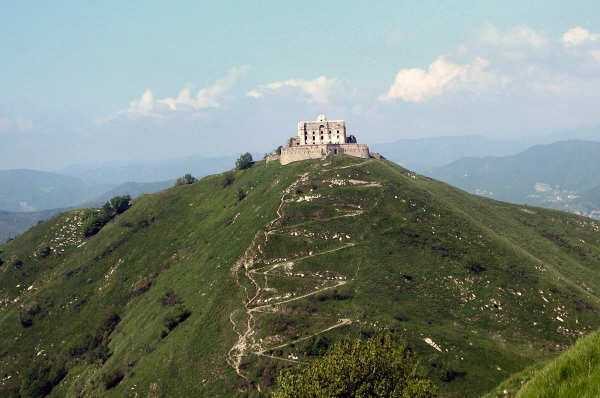
Fort Diamante.

=== Villas and palaces ===
In Bolzaneto and on Murta hill there were, in the past centuries, many villas and palaces used as summer residences by the noble and rich Genoese families. Some of these survived today, although now surrounded by factories and sheds. These buildings, restructured, are used as schools, offices or private houses.

Among these Villa Carrega (17th century) and Villa Garibaldi (now both used as nursery schools) and, on the right bank of Polcevera the Palaces Rivarola and Pareto. Near the hamlet of Cremeno is the Villa Cambiaso, which was the summer residence of Giovanni Battista Cambiaso, who was Doge of the Republic of Genoa (from 1771 to 1773).

=== Places of worship ===
==== Church of N.S. della Neve ====
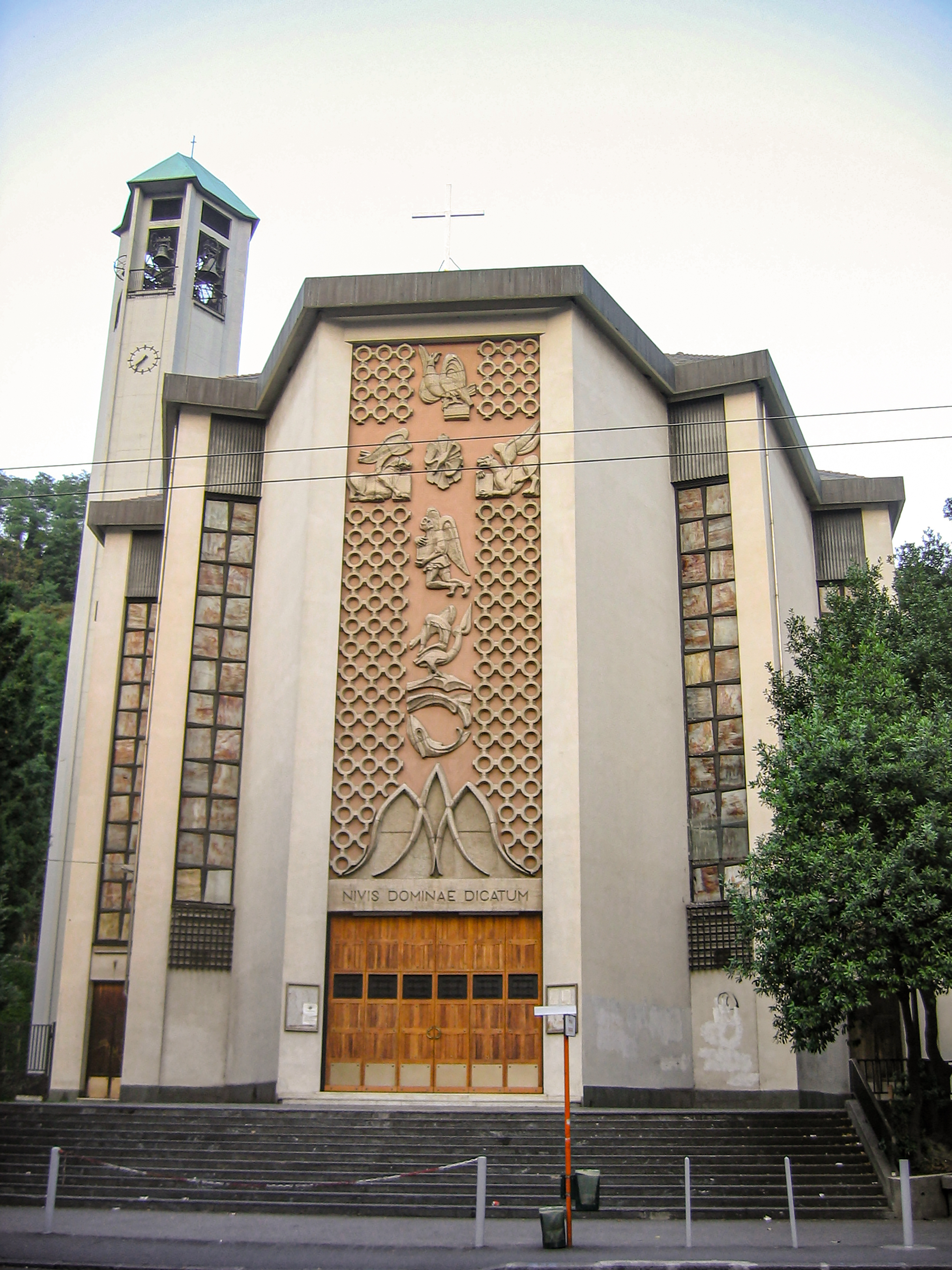
Church of N.S. della Neve.

The first Church of N.S. della Neve was built in the 14th century as a chapel depending by the parish of San Felice of Brasile, restored in seventeenth century and completely rebuilt in 1855 when it became the seat of the parish.

In 1956 a new modern church, consecrated by Cardinal Giuseppe Siri in 1960, was built in another site nearby and the old church was demolished.

In this new church has been placed the Baroque altars and statues of the old church. In the church there are also two paintings by Paolo Gerolamo Piola (Conversion of Saint Paul and Abraham receives three angels) and a Dead Jesus by Giulio Cesare Procaccini.

==== Church and monastery of San Francesco alla Chiappetta ====
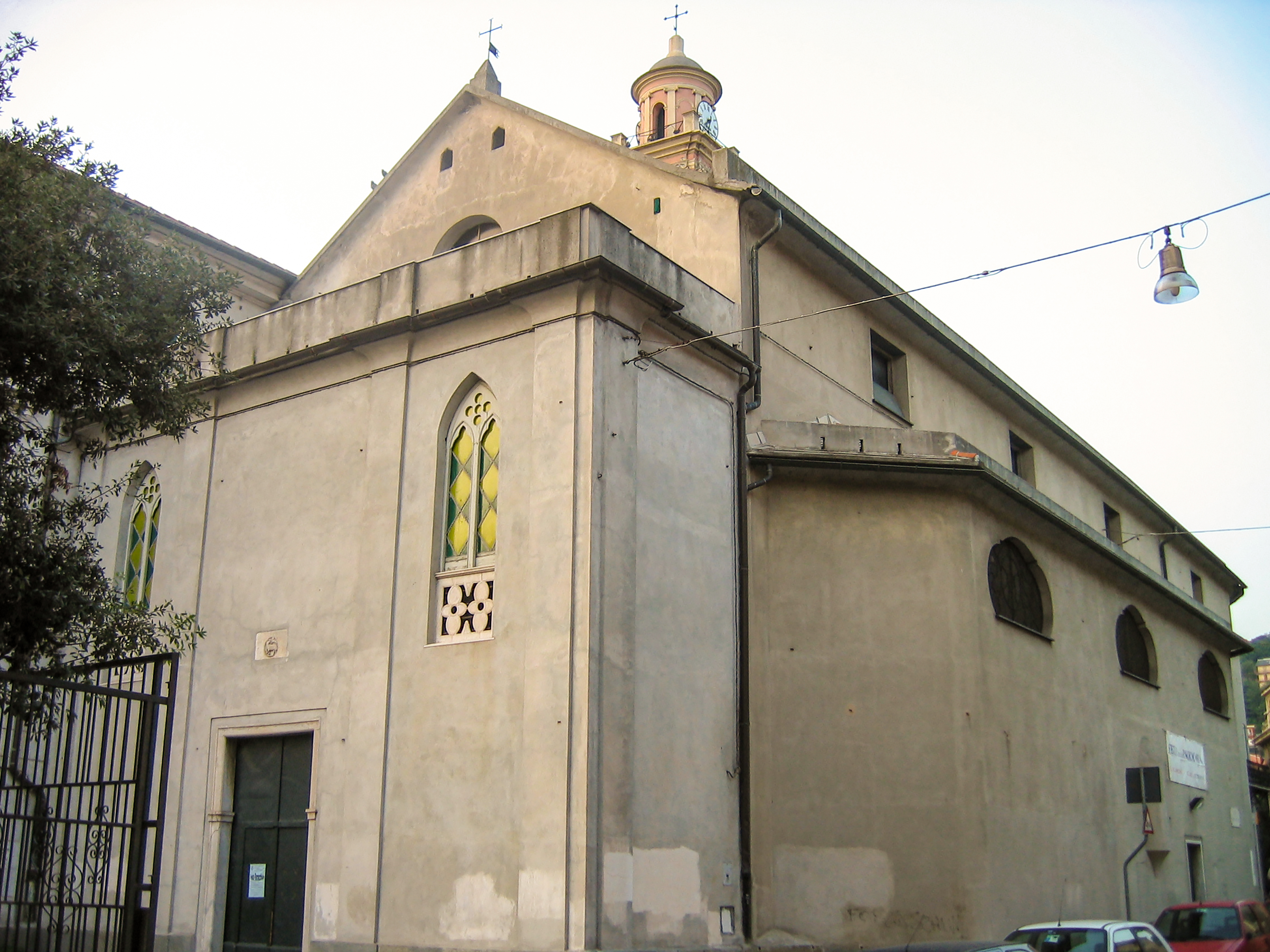
Church of San Francesco

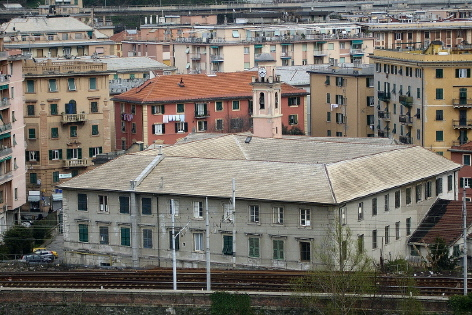
Monastery of San Francesco alla Chiappetta

According to tradition, the site of the church and monastery of San Francesco was given by the noble family Lercari to St. Francis of Assisi, who was in Genoa in 1213 during a trip to France, but there are no documents that attest that.

The donation of the land is documented by a Convention act for the building of the monastery and the church of Chiappetta, stipulated in the 1280 between the family Lercari and the Franciscan Order, implemented in 1291.

In the following years the monastery and the church were built, in primitive Gothic style.

In the second half of the 17th century, the cloister was built on, and, at the beginning of eighteenth century, the church and the monastery had been completely restructured.

The inside of the church was remade in Baroque (style) by the Lombard architect Francesco Muttoni (1668–1747).

Inside the church, which has a single nave, there are some remarkable paintings from the 17th century: Stigmata of St. Francis by Giovanni Battista Carlone, Assumption of the Blessed Virgin Mary by Pietro Paolo Raggi (1649-1724), St. Catherine Fieschi's Ecstasy and Immaculate Conception by Domenico Piola and St. Anthony's Miracle” by Giuseppe Galeotti.

There is also a wooden Madonna by Anton Maria Maragliano (1664–1741).

In 1798, due to Napoleon's suppression of religious orders, the Franciscan friars had to leave the monastery, and the church was entrusted to the diocesan clergy until 1896, when they could return.

As mentioned above, the monastery and the church, due to the work to embank the torrent Polcevera (middle of the 19th century), passed from the right to the left bank of the stream.

== Transport ==
=== Roads ===
Bolzaneto is crossed by the National Road 35 “dei Giovi”, and the Highway A7 Genoa - Milan, of which there is an important toll exit.

From Bolzaneto begin several provincial roads that leads to towns in the hinterland (Ceranesi, Sant'Olcese and Serra Riccò).

=== Railways ===
Bolzaneto has a railway station on the line of Giovi (Genoa-Sampierdarena, Bolzaneto, Pontedecimo, Busalla, Ronco Scrivia). This line is covered only by regional trains from Genoa to Busalla, Arquata Scrivia, Novi Ligure, Alessandria, and vice versa.

Intercity trains to and from Milan and Turin, are routed on the Giovi branch line, which crosses longitudinally Bolzaneto, parallel to the line of Giovi.
