= Siege of Negroponte (1351) =

Siege of the War of the Straits

The siege of Negroponte was undertaken by the Genoese admiral Paganino Doria against the Venetian stronghold of Negroponte (modern Chalcis) in eastern Greece, during the Third Genoese–Venetian War. The fortress, commanded by Niccolò Pisani, held out until the approach of a joint Venetian-Catalan fleet forced Doria to withdraw on 1 October.

== Sources ==
- Balard, Michel (2016). "The Genoese in the Aegean (1204–1566)". In Stuckey, Jace (ed.). The Eastern Mediterranean Frontier of Latin Christendom. London and New York: Routledge. pp. 117–133. ISBN 978-1-47242275-0.
