= Battle of the Bosporus =

1352 naval battle between Genoa and Venice

- Part of the War of the Straits
- Constantinople and its surroundings during the Byzantine period
Date	13 February 1352
Location	Bosporus 41°03′00″N 29°02′18″E
Result	Tactical draw; Genoese strategic success

Belligerents
Republic of Venice; Crown of Aragon; Byzantine Empire	Republic of Genoa

Commanders and leaders
Niccolò Pisani; Pancrazio Giustinian †; Pons di Santapau; Constantine Tarchaneiotes	Paganino Doria

Strength
89 or 90 galleys	60 or 64 galleys

Casualties and losses
23 galleys	16 galleys

The Battle of the Bosporus or Bosphorus took place on 13 February 1352 during the War of the Straits, between the fleet of the Republic of Genoa on one side and an allied fleet of the Republic of Venice, the Crown of Aragon, and the Byzantine Empire on the other. The battle was begun late during the day and was fought largely during the night in the narrows of the Bosporus amidst a storm, resulting in a confused fight with high casualties on both sides. The Genoese were left as the victors, having suffered fewer casualties and remaining in place while the allies withdrew. The battle forced the Byzantine emperor John VI Kantakouzenos to come to terms with Genoa, exiting the war and confirming the de facto independence of the Genoese colony of Galata from the Byzantine Empire.

== Background ==
Following the Treaty of Nymphaeum in 1261, the Republic of Genoa established a merchant colony, known as Pera or Galata, just across the Golden Horn from the Byzantine Empire's capital, Constantinople. The Genoese progressively fortified their colony, defying Byzantine authority and siphoning off most of the trade that once went to Constantinople; according to the contemporary Byzantine historian Nikephoros Gregoras, the toll proceeds for Galata in 1348 were 200,000 hyperpyra, as opposed to just 30,000 for Constantinople. The subsequent attempts by Emperor John VI Kantakouzenos to shake off Genoese influence and revive the Imperial fleet backfired: in a brief conflict in 1348–1349, the Genoese of Galata captured the newly rebuilt Imperial fleet and blockaded the Byzantine capital which gave them de facto control over the passage of the Bosporus strait into the Black Sea. These successes, coupled with the conquest of Chios and Phocaea in 1346, worried Genoa's long-time commercial rival, the Republic of Venice, which was already engaged in a fierce commercial antagonism especially in the Black Sea, where the Genoese had the upper hand, and to which access was now in the hands of the Genoese, who could control the passage of the Bosporus from Galata. The Venetians' fears are outlined by Gregoras, who reports that the Genoese intended to establish a monopoly on the Black Sea trade, excluding their Venetian rivals entirely from the region.

The tensions led to the outbreak of the War of the Straits between Genoa and Venice in August 1350, in which Galata became a focal point of the conflict; already in September of that year a Venetian fleet under Marco Ruzzini attacked the Genoese colony, but withdrew after discovering its fortifications to be too strong to quickly defeat. In 1351, another Venetian fleet under Giovanni Dolfin, was sent to attack Galata. After Kantakouzenos allied himself with Venice in April/May, another fleet under Niccolò Pisani was sent to join the Byzantines and jointly besiege Galata, while Venice undertook to finance two thirds of the sum required for the fielding of a fleet of 12 galleys by the Byzantine emperor. At the same time, Venice concluded an alliance with the Crown of Aragon, which agreed to provide warships on similar terms, i.e. funded by Venice but crewed by Aragonese. Faced with the Venetian alliance-building, the Genoese moved to reinforce their most important overseas possession, and on 13 July 1351, sixty ships with 180 men on board each sailed from Genoa, under the command of Paganino Doria.

== Battle ==
When Pisani heard of Doria's sailing, he abandoned the blockade of Galata and withdrew to the Venetian colony of Negroponte (Chalkis). There he scuttled his ships and was in turn blockaded by Doria until he was forced to withdraw in the face of an Aragonese fleet of forty galleys under Pancrazio Giustinian and Pons di Santapau. Doria withdrew to Chios, where he replenished his forces and filled out his crews, and then sailed north. His fleet raided the island of Tenedos and the port of Heraclea in the Sea of Marmara, before sailing to Galata. The Genoese received some support from the neighbouring Ottoman ruler Orhan and the Aydinids, but lacked supplies and allowed several months to pass without decisive action, remaining at Galata while Kantakouzenos ensconced himself behind the strong walls of Constantinople and awaited the arrival of his allies. In November, however, the Genoese sacked the Byzantine city of Sozopolis (Sozopol) in the Black Sea.

The stalemate was broken in early February 1352, when the allied fleet under Pisani arrived: the ships of Giustinian and Santapau, along with the refloated ships of Pisani's squadron. The allies had been delayed by storms along the way, and had lost some ships as a result as well. Doria tried to sally forth and engage the Aragonese and Venetians before they could join the Byzantines, but contrary winds prevented him from doing so until 13 February. The two fleets met near the Princes' Islands, southeast of the entrance to the Bosporus. The encounter happened late in the day, leaving just two hours of light, but the Aragonese commander, Santapau, insisted on fighting. As the wind favoured his opponents, Doria withdrew north and was unable to prevent the union of the Venetians and Aragonese with the Byzantine fleet, led by Constantine Tarchaneiotes. This placed the Genoese, with their 60 (64 according to some accounts) ships at a disadvantage compared to the 89 or 90 allied vessels (45 Venetian, 30 Aragonese, and 14 Byzantine ones). By number of ships taking part, the battle of the Bosporus was one of the largest in the late Middle Ages.

The allied fleet followed the Genoese north into the Bosporus Strait, past Galata to the narrower part of the Strait, in the area of Diplokionion (Beşiktaş). Pushed by the wind, the allied fleet apparently overtook the Genoese, and had to turn to engage them. All of this happened in an increasingly stormy sea, with night falling. Both sides tried to bring their battle lines in order but failed, and the ensuing combat was a disorganized carnage that lasted well into the night. The Byzantines apparently never engaged in battle and fled before it began, thus reducing the allied fleet's numerical advantage. Losses were high on both sides, not least because in the confusion the opponents could not tell each other apart. The Genoese losing 16 galleys, and the Venetians and Aragonese 23, as well as admiral Pancrazio Giustinian. The Aragonese, who fought in unknown waters, suffered more than the Venetians. Faced with their heavy losses, the allies withdrew, leaving the field to the Genoese, but both sides were to claim victory in the battle. Santapau wrote to King Peter IV of Aragon claiming to have captured 23 Genoese galleys, while losing 12 ships, of which only the crews of two were lost. In reality, the battle was a bloody draw without a decisive result.

== Aftermath ==
Both sides spent the next couple of weeks recuperating. Due to the atrocious conditions the battle was fought in, few prisoners were taken. Some Franciscans tried to arrange a prisoner exchange. After visiting the Genoese they went to the Venetians, expecting to find many prisoners as the Genoese had reported many missing. Instead they only found a handful of prisoners and decided not to return to the Genoese, lest the latter, driven by anger and grief at their companions' fate, kill their Venetian prisoners. The Venetians buried Giustinian in a church in Constantinople. Many shipwrecked Aragonese sailors were cared for by the Byzantines, and 300 of them chose to remain in Imperial service as mercenaries after this. When Doria sailed his fleet and offered battle on 3 March, the allies refused to sail out to meet him. Doria then anchored on the Asian side of the Bosporus, welcomed by Orhan, until the Aragonese and Venetians left in April.

Strategically, therefore, the Genoese emerged as the victors from the confrontation, having managed to thwart the allies' attempt to dislodge them from their choke-hold on the entrance to the Black Sea. Abandoned by their allies, the Byzantines were forced to come to terms with the Genoese, who with Ottoman assistance blockaded Constantinople. In a treaty signed on 6 May 1352, Kantakouzenos ended the war with Genoa, recognized the full possession of Galata by the Genoese, renewed the privileges of the Treaty of Nymphaeum, barred Venetian and Aragonese ships from his ports, and agreed to prohibit his own merchants to sail to Tanais without Genoese consent. Doria and his fleet returned home in August of the same year, but the losses suffered were so heavy that he was not given any honours. The conflict between Genoa, Venice, and Aragon dragged on for three more years, with alternating battlefield success, ending with a peace that favoured neither side.

== Sources ==
- Balard, Michel (1970). "A propos de la bataille du Bosphore – L'expédition génoise de Paganino Doria à Constantinople (1351-1352)". Travaux et Mémoires (in French). Vol. IV. pp. 431–469.
- Balard, Michel (1997). "La lotta contro Genova". Storia di Venezia dalle origini alla caduta della Serenissima. Vol. III, La formazione dello stato patrizio (in Italian). Rome: Istituto della Enciclopedia Italiana. pp. 87–126.
- Balard, Michel (2017). "Les Génois dans l'empire byzantin". Gênes et la mer - Genova e il mare (in French). Vol. II. Genoa: Società Ligure di Storia Patria. pp. 661–507. ISBN 978-88-97099-42-0.
- Dotson, John E. (2002). "Venice, Genoa and Control of the Seas in the Thirteenth and Fourteenth Centuries". In Hattenforf, John B.; Unger, Richard W. (eds.). War at Sea in the Middle Ages and the Renaissance. Woodbridge, Suffolk: Boydell & Brewer. pp. 119–136. ISBN 0-85115-903-6.
- Lane, Frederic Chapin (1973). Venice, A Maritime Republic. Baltimore, Maryland: Johns Hopkins University Press. ISBN 0-8018-1445-6.
- Musarra, Antonio (2020). Il Grifo e il Leone: Genova e Venezia in lotta per il Mediterraneo (in Italian). Bari and Rome: Editori Laterza. ISBN 978-88-581-4072-7.
- Nicol, Donald M. (1993) [1972]. The Last Centuries of Byzantium, 1261–1453 (2nd ed.). Cambridge: Cambridge University Press. ISBN 978-0-521-43991-6.
- Ravegnani, Giorgio (2001). "GIUSTINIAN, Pancrazio". Dizionario Biografico degli Italiani (in Italian). Vol. 57: Giulini–Gonzaga. Rome: Institute of the Italian Encyclopaedia. ISBN 978-88-12-00032-6.
- Setton, Kenneth M. (1975). "The Catalans in Greece, 1311–1388". In Setton, Kenneth M.; Hazard, Harry W. (eds.). A History of the Crusades, Volume III: The Fourteenth and Fifteenth Centuries. Vol. 3. Madison and London: University of Wisconsin Press. pp. 167–224. ISBN 0-299-06670-3.
