= Giovanni I di Murta =

2nd Doge of Genoa from 1345 to 1350

2nd Lifetime Doge of the Republic of Genoa
- In office 25 December 1345 – 6 January 1350
- Preceded by: Simone Boccanegra
- Succeeded by: Giovanni II Valente

Personal details
- Born: unknown date Murta, Republic of Genoa
- Died: 6 January 1350 Genoa, Republic of Genoa
- Party: Popolani
- Profession: Banker

Giovanni di Murta (died 6 January 1350) was the second Doge of Genoa following the resignation of Simone Boccanegra, on 25 December 1345. His dogate was dominated by his attempts to break the circle of political violence which had crippled the city over the past century and to reassert Genoese dominion over the Mediterranean colonies.

== Early life ==
While his date of birth remains unknown, it is assumed that he was born in the early years of the 14th century in the village of Murta in the Val Polcevera, today one of the boroughs of the city of Genoa, to an affluent commoner family, however his mother was from the powerful Usodimare patrician family.

== The Maona of Chios and Phocaea ==
He became a banker by trade. After his accession to the office of doge, he managed to somewhat pacify the city torn apart by the conflict between the various local aristocratic families. In particular, he managed to prevent the Grimaldi clan from seizing the city. Against them, Giovanni di Murta chartered a fleet of over two dozen privately owned armed galleys under the command of the admiral Simone Vignoso.

As the Grimaldis did not go out at sea to oppose the Republic's galleys, the doge sent the navy to support the island of Chios, then a Genoese colony, which was besieged by Jani Beg, khan of the Golden Horde. The fleet also managed to reconquer the city of Phocaea and its important alum mines on 20 September 1346.

Upon his return, the admiral did not receive the very large amount of money initially promised to him as payment for his galleys. Consequently, the doge had to agree to entrust Vignoso and a group of his associates with the governorship of Chios, granting them at the same time the fiscal revenues from the island for twenty years. This group of investors became known as the Maona of Chios and Phocaea.

== Mounting tension in the region ==
Giovanni di Murta also tried to regain control over the island of Corsica. At the beginning of his dogate only the citadel of Bonifacio remained in Genoese hands, the rest of the colony was de facto independent thanks to the support of the Crown of Aragon and of the Venetian fleet. The doge entrusted his son, Tommaso, with the mission of reconquering the island. This expedition marked the end of feudal anarchy in Corsica and the beginning of a more asserted Genoese rule over the island. To fund military operations on the island, the Republic of Genoa had to borrow at interest rates of 20% from an association of creditors known as the Compera nuova acquisitionis Corsicæ on 27 December 1347.

On the diplomatic front, Giovanni di Murta tried to appease the tension between Genoa and Venice that followed the assault of the Genoese of Pera on Constantinople, which was perceived by the Venetians as a threat to their domination in the Levant. He proposed a joint crusade against the Ottomans, an offer which was dismissed by the Venetians.

== Plague and succession ==
The first major outbreaks of the Black Death occurred during his time in office. The Republic of Genoa was one of the first European cities hit by the pandemic, as it was a Genoese ship sailing away from Kaffa, in the Crimea, besieged by the Mongols, that carried the disease across the Mediterranean. From November 1347 to 1351, the plague killed 30 to 40 percent of the population of the city, and the doge himself was among the victims. Giovanni di Murta died of the plague on 6 January 1350 and was buried in the Cathedral of San Lorenzo. His successor, Giovanni Valente, was elected three days later in a climate of tension between popolanis and aristocrats, making evident that his efforts to unite the city would be short-lived.

Unlike most of the other doges of the history of Genoa, Giovanni I di Murta left an excellent image of his time in office. He is hailed as a pacifier at home and abroad and he has even been qualified as a "lover of the common good" by a modern historian.
