= Murta (Genoa) =

Coordinates: 44°27′42″N 8°53′22″E

Murta is a village included in the city of Genoa in northwest Italy.

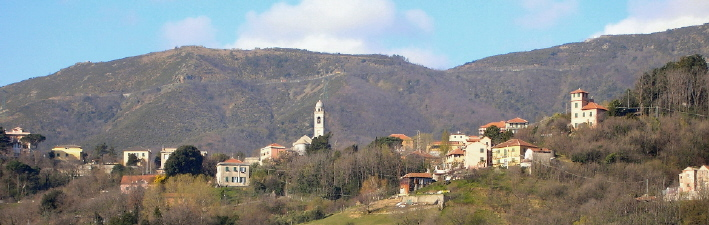
View of Murta

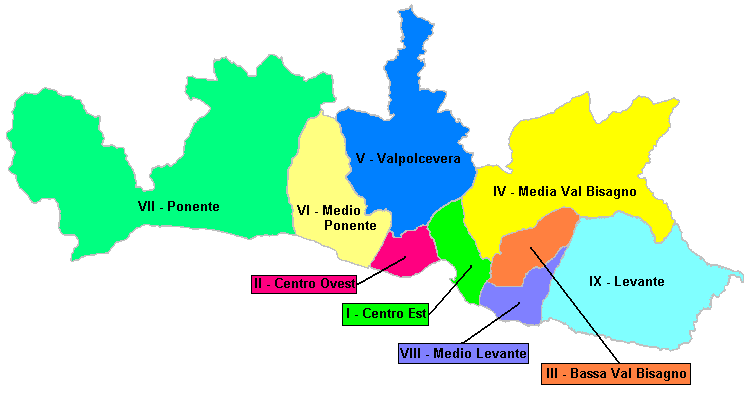
The Valpolcevera municipality is the dark blue area in the map of "Great Genoa".

== Geography ==
Murta is part of the district of Bolzaneto, in the Valpolcevera municipality, of which is a separate hamlet, located on the ridge a hill at the right bank of the torrent Polcevera River.

In the past most people were farmers (the most famous product was the Polcevera white wine, also produced today, although in limited quantity).

Today Murta is a residential area with many small villas built along the side of the hill.

== History ==
The village name derives from the plant of myrtle, in Latin language just called "murta".

The first documents on the Parish of Murta dates from 1143, when it was included on the Register of Diocese of Genoa (wanted by Archbishop Siro II) as a chapel subject to the main church of Rivarolo.

In Murta was born Giovanni da Murta which was the second Doge of the Republic of Genoa from 1344 to 1350.

Like all Valpolcevera, in 1746 the village was involved in War of Austrian Succession and was occupied by an Austrian-Piedmontese army led by the General Botta Adorno, which came up to Genoa, from where was expelled after the popular revolt of December 5th, 1746, set up with the legendary episode of Balilla.

Another Austrian army returned the following year and this time the occupation, lasted from April 11 to July 19, 1747, had even more devastating effects. The Austrians had their headquarters in the Palace Bonarota (Villa Clorinda) and their troops devastated the entire village. All the church vestments and vessels were stolen and the church itself seriously damaged. Also many private houses were plundered and many of them also burnt out.

The local historian Luigi Persoglio wrote that 350 people died, some because of fighting against the invaders, but most for hardships and privations that people suffered in those tragic months.

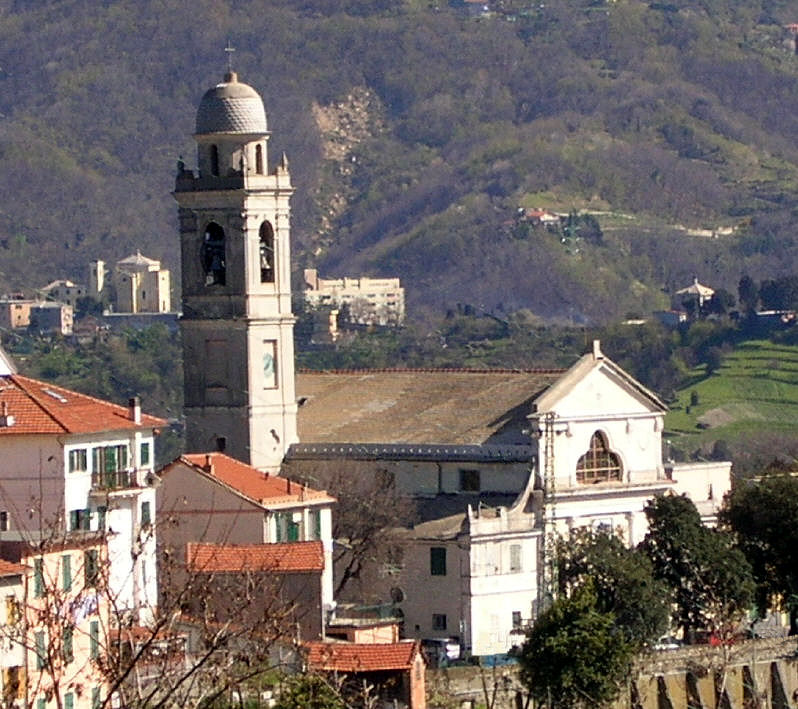
Church of San Martino di Murta.

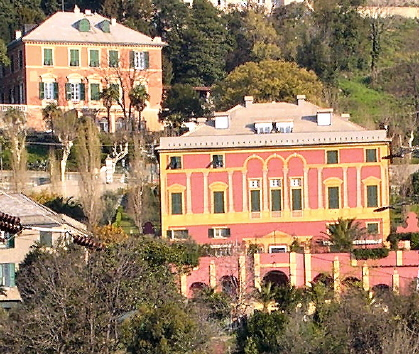
Villa Clorinda.

== Main sights ==
=== Church of San Martino ===
The church, dedicated to St. Martin of Tours, was completely rebuilt in the eighteenth century on the existing one. In 1747, during the War of Austrian Succession, it suffered serious damages.

The rebuilding was completed in 1770, and the inside was remade in Baroque style. Valuable paintings from the 16th and 17th centuries adorn the apse and side altars.

The most precious painting is the icon of St. Martin, attributed to Flemish painter Anthony van Dyck. The painting was saved by the looting of 1747, as it had been carried to Genoa.

In the past the village of Murta was famous also for a great and very old oak next to the church. In some feasts among the branches of this tree was set a temporary cafè (like during the St. Martin feast of 1897). The old tree, already in decay, fell down in August 1948, during a violent storm.

=== Villas and palaces ===
Since the 16th century on Murta hill were built many villas and palaces, used as summer residences by rich and noble Genoese families. Most of these palaces still exist and now, restructured, have become luxurious houses.

Among them the best known is Villa Clorinda, which belonged to several rich Genoese families (Bonarota, Doria and Costa) and today is a luxury residence.

In 1747, during the Austrian occupation of Valpolcevera, it became the headquarters of the invaders' army.

== Events ==
=== Pumpkin exhibition ===
The village of Murta is known for the Pumpkin Exhibition called Dalla A alla ... Zucca (“Zucca” in Italian means “Pumpkin”). It takes place for two consecutive weekends, during the feast of Saint Martin, on the middle of November.

This show is an interesting exhibition of pumpkins, squashes and gourds, including traditional and exotic as well. During the feast the bigger (in 2007 an Atlantic Giant of 325 kg), the longest and the most strange pumpkins are rewarded.

At this exhibition people can enjoy many dishes and drinks based on pumpkin: pumpkin fritters, sweet and savoury, Genoese savoury pumpkin pie and pumpkin grappa.

web site: Murtaezucche.it
