= Battle of Sapienza =

1354 naval battle between Genoese and Venetians

Coordinates: 36°45′20.0″N 21°42′10.0″E

- Part of the War of the Straits
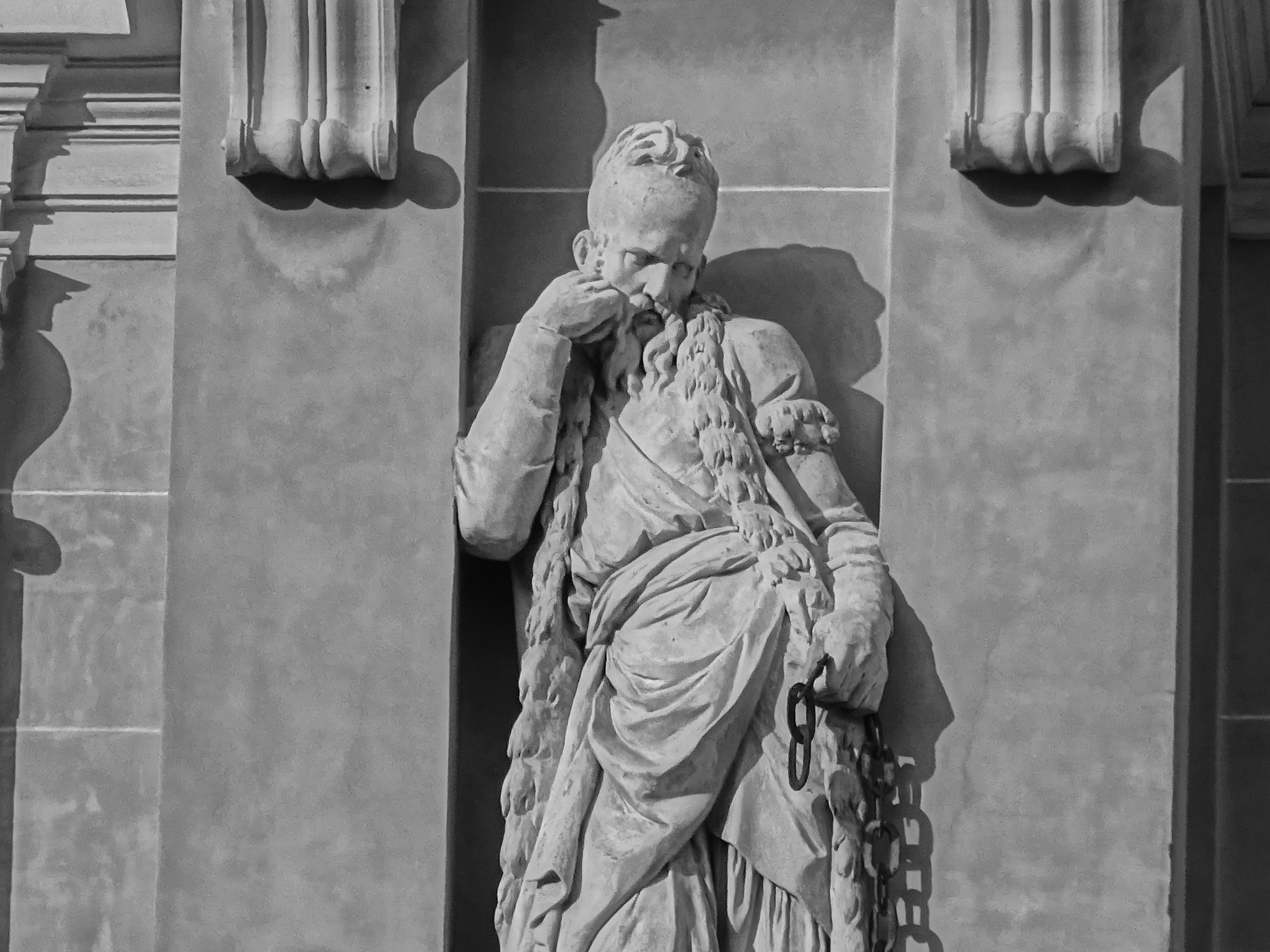
- Statue representing the Venetian commander, Niccolò Pisani, as a captive, from the 18th-century façade of the Doge's Palace of Genoa
| Date | 4 November 1354 |
| Location | Porto Longo, Sapienza |
| Result | Genoese victory |

Belligerents
| Republic of Venice | Republic of Genoa |

Commanders and leaders
| Niccolò Pisani (POW) | Paganino Doria |

Strength
| 36 galleys, five great ships, other smaller vessels | 35 galleys |

Casualties and losses
| over 4,000 men killed all galleys captured 5,400 men taken captive | very few casualties |

The naval Battle of Sapienza, also known as the Battle of Porto Longo or Battle of Zonklon, took place on 4 November 1354, during the Third Genoese–Venetian War.

== Background ==
In summer 1354, the Genoese admiral Paganino Doria, with 24 galleys, avoided the Venetian fleet under Niccolò Pisani, which was operating alongside its Aragonese allies around Sardinia, and instead launched a raid into the Adriatic Sea; the Adriatic was traditionally seen by Venice as its particular area of influence, being known as the "Gulf of Venice".

Doria's fleet raided the Dalmatian islands of Lesina (Hvar) and Curzola (Korčula) and sacked Parenzo (Poreč) in Istria, before turning south and east and making for the Genoese possession of Chios in the Aegean Sea. Doria's depredations and presence in the Aegean forced the Venetian fleet under Pisani to abandon Sardinia and follow him east. His fleet numbered 36 galleys and five great sailing ships, as well as smaller vessels. Despite enjoying qualitative and numerical superiority over Doria's fleet, however, Pisani did not attack at Chios, giving the Doria the chance to obtain reinforcements from the Genoese colony of Pera, 10 galleys under Visconte Grimaldi.

== Battle ==
Pisani sailed back west to the Venetian outpost of Coron (Koroni) at the southwestern tip of Greece, where he arrived on 11 October, to receive new instructions from Venice. According to the most common version of events, Pisani received instructions from the new Doge of Venice, Marino Faliero, to avoid conflict with the Genoese, as the latter had more ships and furthermore negotiations were ongoing to end the war. Other sources however deny the existence of any such instructions. A few days later, for reasons unknown, he left Coron and took up position at the natural harbour of Porto Longo on the offshore island of Sapienza. Aware that the Genoese, whom he had learned had begun their return journey west, would have to pass by, Pisani set his men to fortify the harbour entrance. He stationed 14 of his ships to guard the entrance under Niccolò Querini, but considering them sufficient, left his remaining 21 galleys and other ships at anchor inside the bay and lashed them together.

On 3 November Doria arrived before Sapienza with 35 galleys, but the Venetians did not sail out to give battle. Doria withdrew, but bad weather did not allow him to sail away. As a result, on the next day, Doria sent 15 of his ships to attack the entrance of the harbour, under the command of his nephew, Giovanni Doria. Few details are known, but the Genoese broke or were allowed through the Venetian blockade of the bay's entrance and reached the bulk of the Venetian fleet, which lay immobilized at anchor, forcing Pisani to surrender, followed by Querini, now caught between two enemy squadrons. Over 4,000 Venetians were killed in the battle, and 5,400 taken prisoner, while the Genoese suffered very slight losses. On his return to Genoa, Doria was accorded a triumphal reception and given a sum of money equal to the value of his palace as a reward. In addition, an annual commemoration was decreed on the anniversary of the battle.

== Aftermath ==
Pisani was taken to Genoa, but soon released, only to face prosecution on his return to Venice: he was accused of neglecting his instructions by participating in the siege of Albergho, of not taking advantage of the opportunity to attack the weaker Genoese fleet at Chios, and of not choosing the fortified harbour at Coron or Modon (Methoni) instead of the unprotected anchorage at Porto Longo. Although the charges were excessive and in all likelihood unfair, they reflected the consternation the defeat caused in Venice. Pisani was condemned on 5 August to imprisonment and a fine of 1000 pounds, as well as a prohibition of further military command. He died soon after.

== Sources ==
- Dotson, John E. (2002). "Venice, Genoa and Control of the Seas in the Thirteenth and Fourteenth Centuries". In Hattenforf, John B.; Unger, Richard W. (eds.). War at Sea in the Middle Ages and the Renaissance. Woodbridge, Suffolk: Boydell & Brewer. pp. 119–136. ISBN 0-85115-903-6.
- Lane, Frederic Chapin (1973). Venice, A Maritime Republic. Baltimore, Maryland: Johns Hopkins University Press. ISBN 0-8018-1445-6.
- Musarra, Antonio (2020). Il Grifo e il Leone: Genova e Venezia in lotta per il Mediterraneo (in Italian). Bari and Rome: Editori Laterza. ISBN 978-88-581-4072-7.
- Nuti, Giovanni (1992). "DORIA, Pagano". Dizionario Biografico degli Italiani (in Italian). Vol. 41: Donaggio–Dugnani. Rome: Istituto dell'Enciclopedia Italiana. ISBN 978-88-12-00032-6.
