= Byzantine–Genoese War (1348–1349) =

Conflict between the Byzantine Empire and Genoa

- Part of the Byzantine–Latin wars
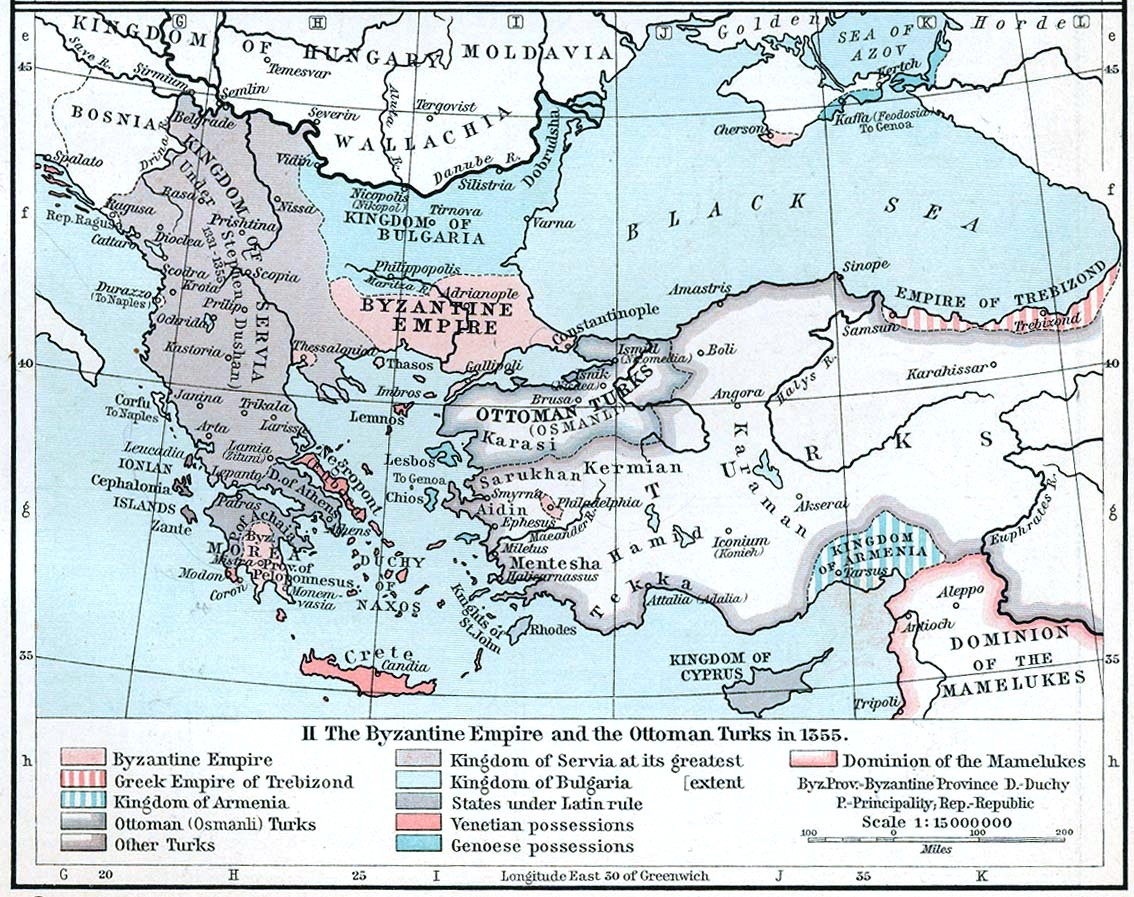
- Byzantine Empire and surrounding territory in 1355, shortly after the Byzantine–Genoese War of 1348–1349
Date	1348–1349
Location	Aegean Sea, Bosphorus, Galata and Constantinople
Result	Indecisive; opinions differ as to outcome.

Belligerents
Byzantine Empire	Republic of Genoa

Commanders and leaders
(Byzantine Empire) John VI	(Republic of Genoa) Giovanni I

The Byzantine–Genoese War of 1348–1349 was fought over control over custom dues through the Bosphorus. The Byzantines attempted to break their dependence for food and maritime commerce on the Genoese merchants of Galata, and also to rebuild their own naval power. Their newly constructed navy however was captured by the Genoese, and a peace agreement was concluded.

== Background ==
The Genoese held the colony of Galata, a suburb of Constantinople across the Golden Horn, as part of the Treaty of Nymphaeum of 1261. This agreement established trade relations between the two powers and granted Genoa extensive privileges within the empire, including the right to collect customs dues at Galata. The Byzantine Empire was still reeling from the civil war of 1341–1347, and these concessions made a recovery difficult. Constantinople collected only thirteen percent of all custom dues from shipping passing through the Bosphorus, only 30,000 hyperpyra a year, with the rest going to Genoa.

The empire was in no position to challenge the Genoese at sea, however. The Byzantine navy, a notable force in the Aegean during the reign of Andronikos III Palaiologos, was completely destroyed during the civil war. Thrace, the main imperial possession besides the Despotate of the Morea, was still recovering following the destruction of marauding Turkish mercenaries during the civil war. Byzantine trade was ruined and there were few other financial reserves for the Empire other than the duties and tariffs from the Bosphorus.

== Conflict ==
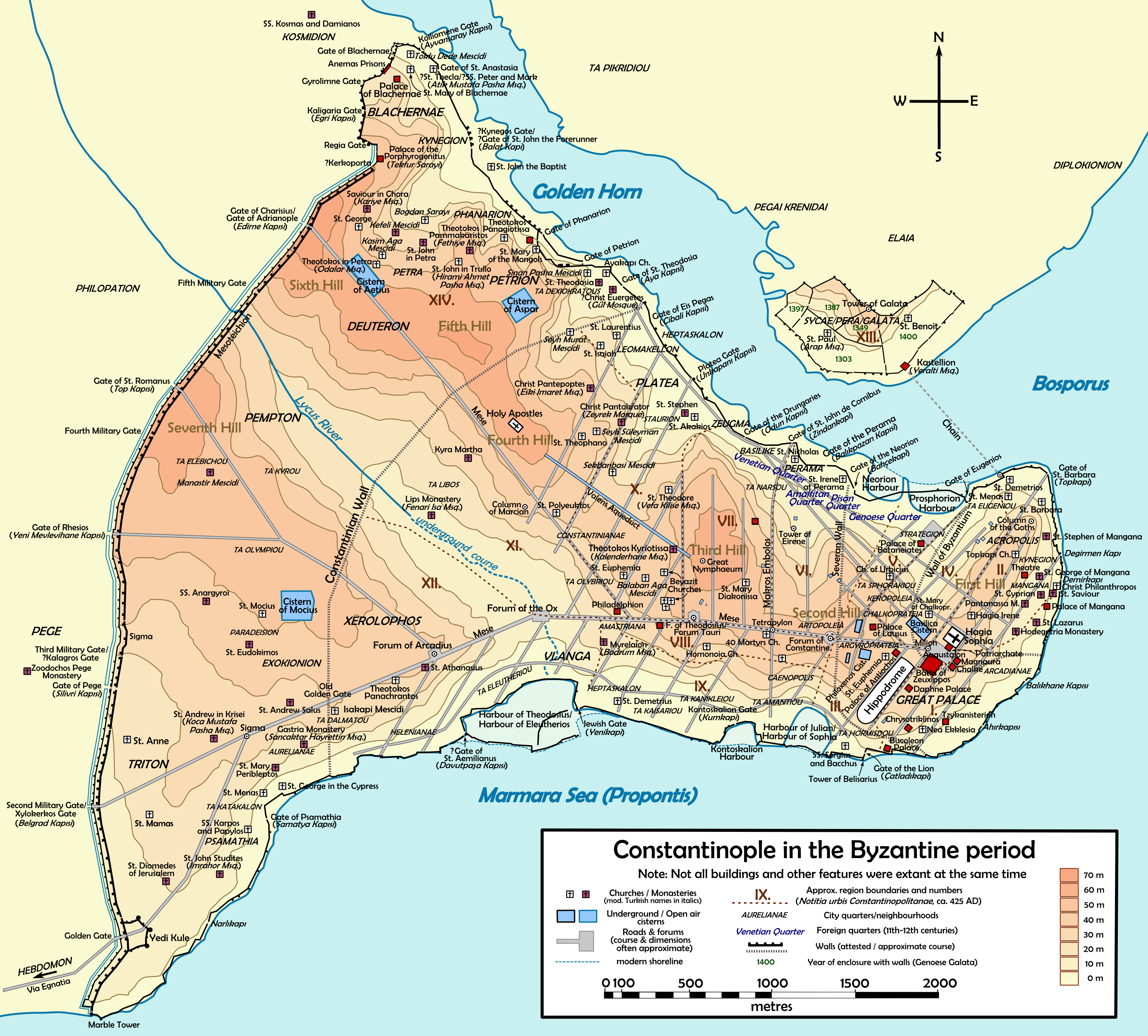
Map of Byzantine Constantinople, with Galata at the center-top

In order to regain control of the custom duties, the emperor John VI Kantakouzenos made preparations to lower Constantinople's duties and most tariffs to undercut the Genoese in Galata. Faced with an empty treasury after the civil war of 1341–1347, the emperor was forced to raise 50,000 hyperpyra in private loans to quickly build up a fleet in anticipation of the coming conflict. When the tariffs and custom duties were finally lowered, merchant shipping coming through the strait bypassed Genoese Galata and diverted their ships across the Golden Horn to Byzantine Constantinople.

The Genoese, sensing the danger, began fortifying Galata in violation of their treaty with Byzantium. They finally declared war in August 1348, and a flotilla of ships sailed across the Horn and attacked the Byzantine fleet; despite their large scale preparations, the Byzantine fleet was destroyed by early 1349. The Byzantines retaliated by burning wharves and warehouses along the shore and catapulted stones and burning bales of hay into Galata, setting major parts of the city on fire. After several weeks of fighting, plenipotentiaries from Genoa came and negotiated a peace agreement. The Genoese agreed to pay a war indemnity of 100,000 hyperpyra and evacuated the land behind Galata which they illegally occupied; last, they promised never to attack Constantinople. In return the Byzantines surrendered nothing, but the Genoese custom duties remained in effect.

== Aftermath ==
The failure of the Byzantines to expel the Genoese from Galata meant that they could never restore their sea power, and would thenceforth be dependent either on Genoa or Venice for naval aid. From 1350, the Byzantines allied themselves to the Republic of Venice, which was also at war with Genoa. However, as Galata remained defiant, the Byzantines were forced to settle the conflict in a compromise peace in May 1352.

== Sources ==
- Nicol, Donald M. (1996). The Reluctant Emperor: A Biography of John Cantacuzene, Byzantine Emperor and Monk, c. 1295–1383. Cambridge, England: Cambridge University Press. ISBN 978-0-521-52201-4.
- Norwich, John. A Short History of Byzantium, Alfred A. Knopf Press, New York, (1997)
- Ostrogorsky, George. History of the Byzantine State, Rutgers University Press, (1969)
