= Niccolò Pisani =

Venetian admiral

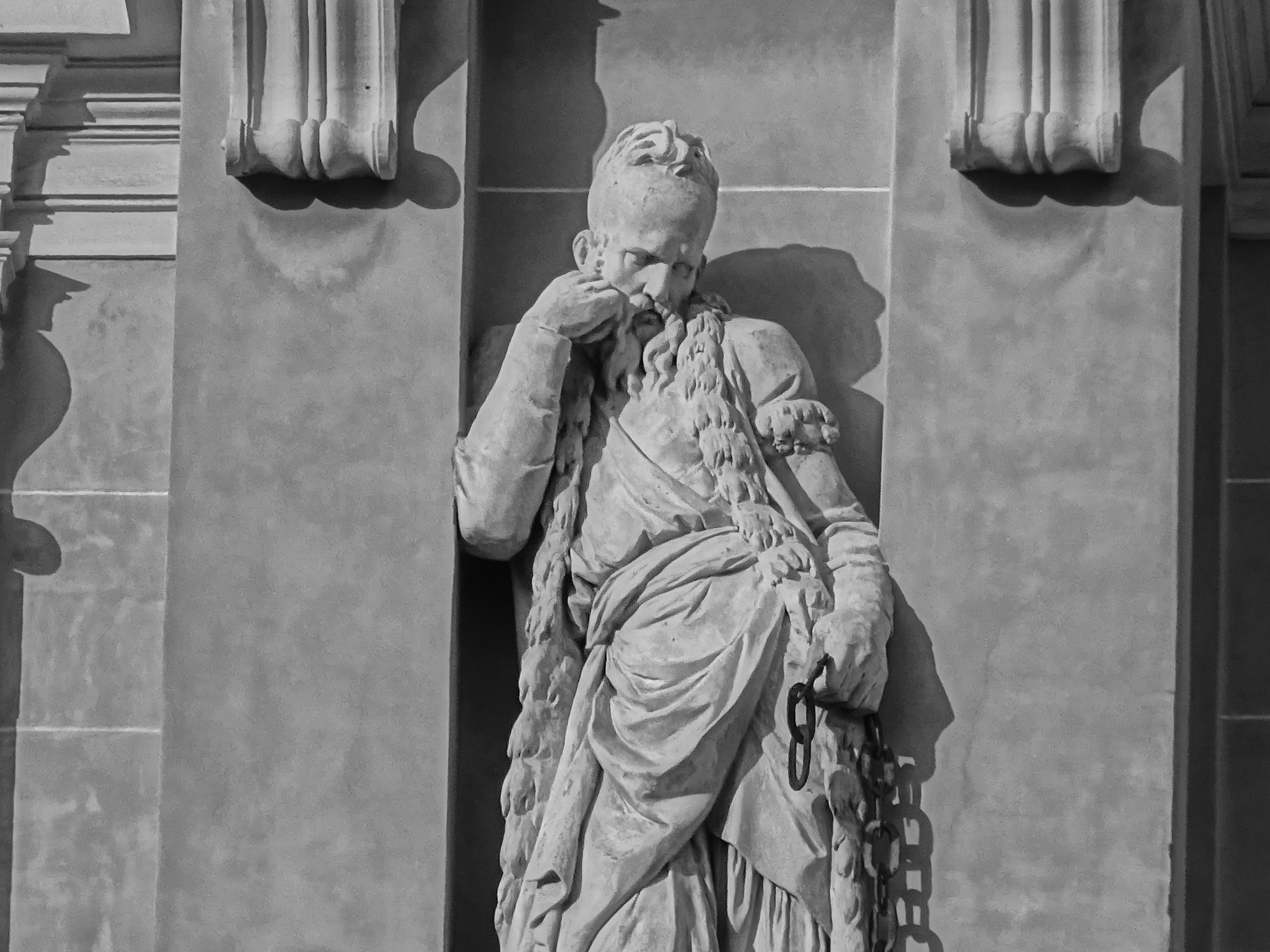
Statue representing Pisani as a captive, from the 18th-century façade of the Doge's Palace of Genoa

Niccolò Pisani (late 1290s – 1355) was a Venetian admiral renowned for his leadership of the Venetian navy during the 1350–1355 War of the Straits between the Republic of Venice and its rival Italian republic, Genoa.

== Early life ==
Niccolò Pisani was born in the late 13th century at Venice, to Pietro Pisani, son of Nicolò. His mother's name, Campagnola, is known, but not her family. As is common with members of the Venetian patriciate, the presence of several namesakes means that his career cannot be reconstructed with certainty. As the historian Giuseppe Gullino comments, based on both the common practice of the time and his later career, he is likely to have spent some time in the Levant as a merchant. He is, however, unlikely to have been the consul in Corfu in 1319 or the Bailo of Constantinople in 1334–1336, or the ambassador to the Byzantine emperor, Andronikos III Palaiologos, in 1339.

Rather, according to Gullino, his is to be identified with the Captain of the Gulf (commander of the Adriatic fleet) who was charged in March 1339 with conveying the ambassadors to the Byzantine court. The appointment lasted until December of the same year, followed by a stint as castellan of the important outpost of Modon (Methoni) on the southwestern tip of Greece, until late summer 1342. It was followed by another naval command in the Aegean, defending the local Venetian possessions and combating piracy from both the Turks and the Venetians' Genoese and Provençal rivals. His service was rewarded with a monetary prize on 26 February 1345, and command of the joint Venetian–Papal fleet, sent out to protect Christian merchants in the Aegean from Turkish pirates. He was still captain of the Venetian galley fleet participating in the papally-sponsored anti-Turkish league in June 1346, being replaced by Pancrazio Giustinian in early 1347.

== War of the Straits ==
In 1350, when a centuries-long feud between Venice and Genoa erupted again into open war, the Venetian doge, Andrea Dandolo, gave the experienced Pisani command of the city's main fleet. Pisani was dispatched in 1352 to engage the Genoan navy, commanded by his counterpart and rival Paganino Doria, near Constantinople. There, Pisani won a victory in a brutal battle against the Genoans at the Battle of the Bosphorus. However, this victory proved indecisive, as Venetian losses were so great they were unable to continue the assault. Pisani later inflicted another devastating blow by wiping out a Genoese fleet off Sardinia.

Pisani's distinguished career came to an end when Doria won a crushing victory over him at Porto Longo in 1354.

Pisani was taken to Genoa, but soon released, only to face prosecution on his return to Venice: he was accused of neglecting his instructions by participating in the siege of Albergho, of not taking advantage of the opportunity to attack the weaker Genoese fleet at Chios, and of abandoning the fortified harbour at Modon for the unprotected anchorage at Porto Longo. Although the charges were excessive and in all likelihood unfair, they reflected the consternation the defeat caused in Venice. Pisani was condemned on 5 August to imprisonment and a fine of 1000 pounds, as well as a prohibition of further military command. He made his will on 30 August, and died soon after, between 3 September and 20 November 1355.

== Sources ==
- Dotson, John E. (2002). "Venice, Genoa and Control of the Seas in the Thirteenth and Fourteenth Centuries". In Hattenforf, John B.; Unger, Richard W. (eds.). War at Sea in the Middle Ages and the Renaissance. Woodbridge, Suffolk: Boydell & Brewer. pp. 119–136. ISBN 0-85115-903-6.
- Gullino, Giuseppe (2015). "PISANI, Nicolo". Dizionario Biografico degli Italiani (in Italian). Vol. 84: Piovene–Ponzo. Rome: Istituto dell'Enciclopedia Italiana. ISBN 978-88-12-00032-6.
- Lane, Frederic Chapin (1973). Venice, A Maritime Republic. Baltimore, Maryland: Johns Hopkins University Press. ISBN 0-8018-1445-6.
- Musarra, Antonio (2020). Il Grifo e il Leone: Genova e Venezia in lotta per il Mediterraneo (in Italian). Bari and Rome: Editori Laterza. ISBN 978-88-581-4072-7.
- Setton, Kenneth M. (1976). The Papacy and the Levant (1204–1571), Volume I: The Thirteenth and Fourteenth Centuries. Vol. 1. Philadelphia: The American Philosophical Society. ISBN 0-87169-114-0.
