= Paganino Doria =

Italian admiral

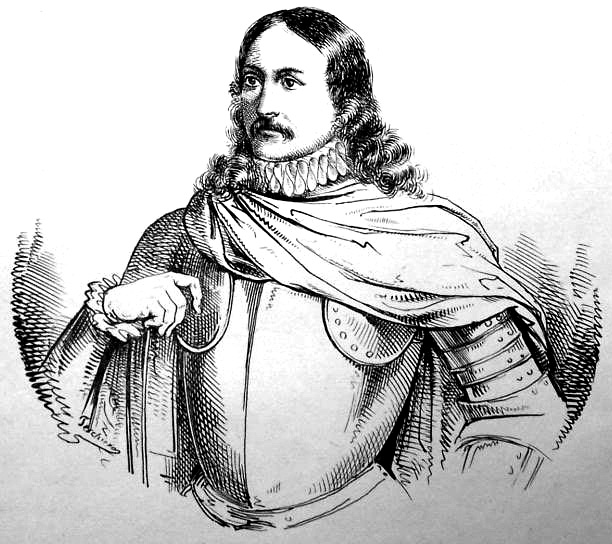
- Born: Genoa
- Died: Genoa
- Burial place: Church of San Domenico
- Military career
- Allegiance: Republic of Genoa
- Conflicts: War of the Straits Siege of Negroponte Battle of the Bosporus Battle of Sapienza

Pagano or Paganino Doria was an Italian admiral from the prominent Genoese Doria family. He was the most significant commander of the Genoese naval forces in the 1350 – 1355 War of the Straits between the Republic of Genoa and its old rival, the Republic of Venice.

== Early life ==
Paganino Doria was born in the late 13th century in Genoa to Gregorio Doria, a member of the distinguished noble Doria family. Gregorio was one of the first Dorias to focus on privateering rather than commerce. With his private fleet, he engaged in piracy against Aragonese ships and in the conflict with Genoa's long-time rival, Pisa. Gregorio was among the Dorias who were exiled from Genoa due to the factional strife between Guelphs and Ghibellines, and was re-admitted to the city only in 1307. Paganino's early life is obscure; he is only attested as owning a galley in 1314 and in a land deed of 1332. But given his later career and that of his father, he likely had extensive naval service as a privateer or mercenary in the Eastern Mediterranean.

He set siege to the Venetian colony of Negroponte in Euboea in 1351.

In 1352, he commanded the Genoese Navy in the Battle of the Bosporus against Niccolò Pisani, admiral of the Venetians, off the coasts of Constantinople: the victory was granted to the Genoese, but it cost them so much that Doria lost the command.

The next year Venetians allied with Catalans defeated Genoa’s fleet led by Antonio Grimaldi off the coast of Sardinia. Genoa had 2,000 men killed and 3,500 taken prisoner. Doria was called back in 1354: he ravaged the coast of the Adriatic (Poreč) and completely captured the Venetian fleet under Pisani at the Battle of Sapienza or in battle of Porto-Longo, between the fortresses of Modon (mod. Methoni) and Navarino or Zonklon (Pylos) in southern Greece.

This brilliant success ended the war. Marino Faliero, Doge of Venice, accepted the terms of peace imposed by Genoa and agreed to pay an indemnity of 200,000 florins.

== Sources ==
- Dotson, John E. (2002). "Venice, Genoa and Control of the Seas in the Thirteenth and Fourteenth Centuries". In Hattenforf, John B.; Unger, Richard W. (eds.). War at Sea in the Middle Ages and the Renaissance. Woodbridge, Suffolk: Boydell & Brewer. pp. 119–136. ISBN 0-85115-903-6.
- Musarra, Antonio (2020). Il Grifo e il Leone: Genova e Venezia in lotta per il Mediterraneo (in Italian). Bari and Rome: Editori Laterza. ISBN 978-88-581-4072-7.
- Nuti, Giovanni (1992). "DORIA, Pagano". Dizionario Biografico degli Italiani (in Italian). Vol. 41: Donaggio–Dugnani. Rome: Istituto dell'Enciclopedia Italiana. ISBN 978-88-12-00032-6.
