= 1368 =

1368 in various calendars
- Gregorian calendar: 1368; MCCCLXVIII
- Ab urbe condita: 2121
- Armenian calendar: 817; ԹՎ ՊԺԷ
- Assyrian calendar: 6118
- Balinese saka calendar: 1289–1290
- Bengali calendar: 774–775
- Berber calendar: 2318
- English Regnal year: 41 Edw. 3 – 42 Edw. 3
- Buddhist calendar: 1912
- Burmese calendar: 730
- Byzantine calendar: 6876–6877
- Chinese calendar: 丁未年 (Fire Goat); 4065 or 3858 — to — 戊申年 (Earth Monkey); 4066 or 3859
- Coptic calendar: 1084–1085
- Discordian calendar: 2534
- Ethiopian calendar: 1360–1361
- Hebrew calendar: 5128–5129
- Hindu calendars
- Vikram Samvat: 1424–1425
- Shaka Samvat: 1289–1290
- Kali Yuga: 4468–4469
- Holocene calendar: 11368
- Igbo calendar: 368–369
- Iranian calendar: 746–747
- Islamic calendar: 769–770
- Japanese calendar: Jōji 7 / Ōan 1 (応安元年)
- Javanese calendar: 1281–1282
- Julian calendar: 1368; MCCCLXVIII
- Korean calendar: 3701
- Minguo calendar: 544 before ROC 民前544年
- Nanakshahi calendar: −100
- Thai solar calendar: 1910–1911
- Tibetan calendar: མེ་མོ་ལུག་ལོ་ (female Fire-Sheep); 1494 or 1113 or 341 — to — ས་ཕོ་སྤྲེ་ལོ་ (male Earth-Monkey); 1495 or 1114 or 342

January 12: Zhu Yuanzhang establishes the Ming dynasty in China with himself as the Hongwu Emperor.

1368 (MCCCLXVIII) was a leap year starting on Saturday of the Julian calendar.

== Events ==
=== January–March ===
- January 12 – Zhu Yuanzhang declares himself as Emperor of China and forces Emperor Huizong of the Yuan dynasty to flee the capital, Yingtian (now Nanjing).
- January 23 – Zhu Yuanzhang establishes the Ming dynasty with himself as the Emperor Hongwu. The new dynasty will last until 1644. The Emperor immediately orders every county magistrate to set up four granaries, and halts government taxation on books. Work begins later year on restoring the surviving Great Wall of China.
- February 13 – Otto VII, Elector of Brandenburg signs the Treaty of Dramburg a treaty with King Casimir III of Poland, returning the town of Wôłcz (now Walcz) to Poland's control.
- February 24 – King Edward III of England summons the English Parliament to meet at Westminster on May 1.
- March 4 – On behalf of Louis of Anjou, brother of France's King Charles V, Bertrand Du Guesclin and 2,000 troops began a siege of the city of Tarascon, which surrenders to him on March 22.
- March 7 –
  - Mamluk raid on Cyprus (1368): Acting at the orders of Egypt's Mamluk Sultan al-Ashraf Sha'ban, General Ibrahim al-Tazi lands with 500 troops at Cyprus and begins a 23-day raid.
  - The new Ōan era is proclaimed in Japan, ending the Jōji era because of problems in 1367 with an epidemic and natural disasters.
- March 16 – 12th waning of Tabaung, 729 ME. In what is now Myanmar, the coronation of Swa Saw Ke as King of Ava is held. Swa Saw Ke had taken power on six months earlier on September 5, but waited for the court astrologers to determine the ideal date for the coronation ceremony.
- March 29 – Emperor Chōkei accedes to the throne of Japan.
- March 30 – Mamluk raid on Cyprus (1368): Ibrahim al-Tazi completes raid by Egypt's Mamluk Sultanate on the Kingdom of Cyprus and begins sending back captured treasure.

=== April–June ===
- April 4 – The siege of Copenhagen, capital of the Kingdom of Denmark, is started by the Hanseatic League as 37 ships and 2,000 soldiers arrive at the city after sailing from the German city of Lübeck under the leadership of the city's leader, Bruno von Warendorp. The invaders bring with them 400 horses and eight trebuchets (long range catapults) and four regular catapults. While the city falls in four weeks, the Absalon fortress on Slotsholmen island holds out for two months.
- April 30 – Henry of Trastámara, deposed a year earlier from his position as King of Castile and Leon, captures the city of León after a siege of more than three months.
- May 1 – The English Parliament is opened for a 21-day session by King Edward III.
- May 2 – Copenhagen, capital of Denmark, falls to the Hanseatic League four weeks after the April 4 invasion of the kingdom and King Valdemar IV is forced to flee while the city is pillaged and looted by troops led by Bruno von Warendorp.
- May 10 – Forces of the Republic of Venice suppress the Revolt of Saint Titus against Venetian rule in the Kingdom of Candia on the island of Crete).
- May 21 – The English Parliament adjourns and King Edward III gives royal assent multiple new laws, including the landmark Observance of Due Process of Law, "declaring that none shall be put to answer an accusation made to the King without presentment", still in effect more than 650 years later. The King also approves the Naturalisation Act (" Children born beyond sea in the King's dominions shall be inheritable in England".
- May 25 – The Duchy of Wolgast, created more than 200 years earlier in 1160 as part of the division of the Duchy of Pomerania, is divided among the heirs of the late Barnim IV, who had been co-ruler with his brothers Wartislaw V and Bogislaw V.
- June 10 – Michele Morosini becomes the new Doge of the Republic of Venice and replaces the late Doge Andrea Contarini, but he serves for only four months before dying in office at the age of 74.
- June 16 – The siege of Copenhagen by the Hanseatic League ends as the remaining defenders of Absalon Castle surrender and the building is destroyed.

=== July–September ===
- July 28 – With the death of Bolko II the Small, one of the Dukes of Silesia, his widow Agnes of Austria receives control of the Duchy of Świdnica, the duchies of Jawor, Lwówek Śląski and Lusatia, and half of five other Polish duchies (Brzeg, Oława from, Siewierz, Głogów and Ścinawa. Upon her death 14 years later, the duchies are all incorporated into the Crown of Bohemia and its ruler, Wenceslaus IV.
- August 15 – The Ming General Xu Da sets off from Kaifeng at the direction of the Chinese Emperor Hongwu, with plans to rid China of the former Yuan dyansty Emperor Huizong.
- August 25 – Count Gottfried IV of Ambsbe, who has no children, sells Arnsberg to the Duchy of Westphalia by way of the Archbishop of Köln, for 30,000 guilders, allowing Westphalia to complete its reunification.
- September 10 – Xu Da captures the city of Tongzhou after defeating a Yuan army, forcing Huizong to flee to Shangdu.
- September 14 – General Xu Da captures the Yuan city of Khanbaliq and renames it Beiping ("northern peace"), a forerunner to the current name of Beijing ("northern capital").

=== October–December ===
- October 11 – Pope Urban V issues a papal bull appointing William Whittlesey as Archbishop of Canterbury, and "primate of all England".
- October 16 – Michele Morosini dies in office from the bubonic plague, only four months after becoming Doge of Venice, and is replaced by Antonio Venier as the Republic's chief executive.
- October 17 –
  - Lionel, Duke of Clarence, second only to Edward the Black Prince as heir to the throne of England, dies in Italy at the age of 29, less than five months after her May 28 marriage to Violante Visconti, daughter of Galeazzo II Visconti Lord of Milan. Lionel's death, suspected to have been from accidental food poisoning, ends any chance for an alliance between England and Milan.
  - Charles IV, Holy Roman Emperor and Pope Urban V meet at Viterbo in Italy and make plans to enter Rome together after the Pope's travel from Avignon.
- October 21 – Charles greets Pope Urban at Monte Mario, and the two ride together to a welcome in Rome.
- November 1 – Elizabeth of Pomerania, wife of the Charles IV, is crowned as the Empress of the Holy Roman Empire by Pope Urban V.
- November 21 – King Algirdas of Lithuania and the Grand Duke Mikhail II of Tver defeat troops of the Grand Duchy of Moscow in the Battle of the Trosna River, and reach the outside of the Moscow Kremlin Wall that surrounds the capital, but find it to be insurmountable and are unable to mount a siege.
- December 3 – Joanna of Bourbon, Queen consort of France as wife of King Charles V, gives birth to his first child, the Dauphin Charles of Valois. The Dauphin will become King Charles VI in 1380 upon the death of his father.
- December 7 – The Treaty of Plüschow is signed, allowing Albrecht II, Duke of Mecklenburg, to purchase neighboring Schwerin for 20,000 silver Marks to create Mecklenburg-Schwerin, jointly ruled by his wife, Richardis.

=== Date unknown ===
- Durrës, the second-largest city in modern-day Albania (at this time known as Dyrrhachium), is captured from the Angevins by Karl Thopia, a powerful feudal prince and warlord.
- Lațcu, son of Bogdan I, deposes his nephew Petru I, and becomes voivode of Moldavia. (Other sources state that Lațcu had succeeded his father Bogdan in 1367).
- Timur ascends the throne of Samarkand (in modern-day Uzbekistan).
- Maha Thammaracha II becomes ruler of the Sukhothai Kingdom (in modern-day northern Thailand) after the death of Maha Thammaracha I.
- Mikhail Aleksandrovich becomes the sole ruler of Tver (in modern-day western Russia), after the death of co-ruler and rival Vasiliy Mikhailovich of Kashin.
- Moscow attacks Tver, which counter-attacks with the aid of Lithuania and the Blue Horde.
- The King of Norway sends the last Royal Ship from Norway to the Greenland Eastern Settlement. This event is part of both the Norse colonization of the Americas, and of the History of Greenland.
- A peace treaty is signed between Norway and the Hanseatic League.
- The Bibliothèque nationale de France (National Library of France) is founded as the Royal Library at the Louvre Palace in Paris, by Charles V of France.
- Petrarch concludes writing the sequence of Italian sonnets and other poems known as Il Canzoniere.

== Births ==
- February 14 – Sigismund, Holy Roman Emperor (d. 1437)
- December 3 – King Charles VI of France (d. 1422)
- probable
  - Louis VII, Duke of Bavaria (d. 1447)
  - Ida de Grey, Cambro-Norman noble (d. 1426)
  - Thomas Hoccleve, English poet (d. 1426)

== Deaths ==
- March 29 – Emperor Go-Murakami of Japan (b. 1328)
- August 25 – Andrea Orcagna, Italian painter, sculptor and architect
- September 12 – Blanche of Lancaster, English duchess, spouse of John of Gaunt (b. 1345)
- October 7 – Lionel of Antwerp, Duke of Clarence, son of Edward III of England (b. 1338)
- undated – Maha Thammaracha I, Thai ruler of the Sukhothai Kingdom and Buddhist philosopher (b. c.1300)
- probable – Ibn Battuta, Arabian traveler
