= War of Padua =

15th century military conflict

- Part of the Venetian expansion in the Terraferma
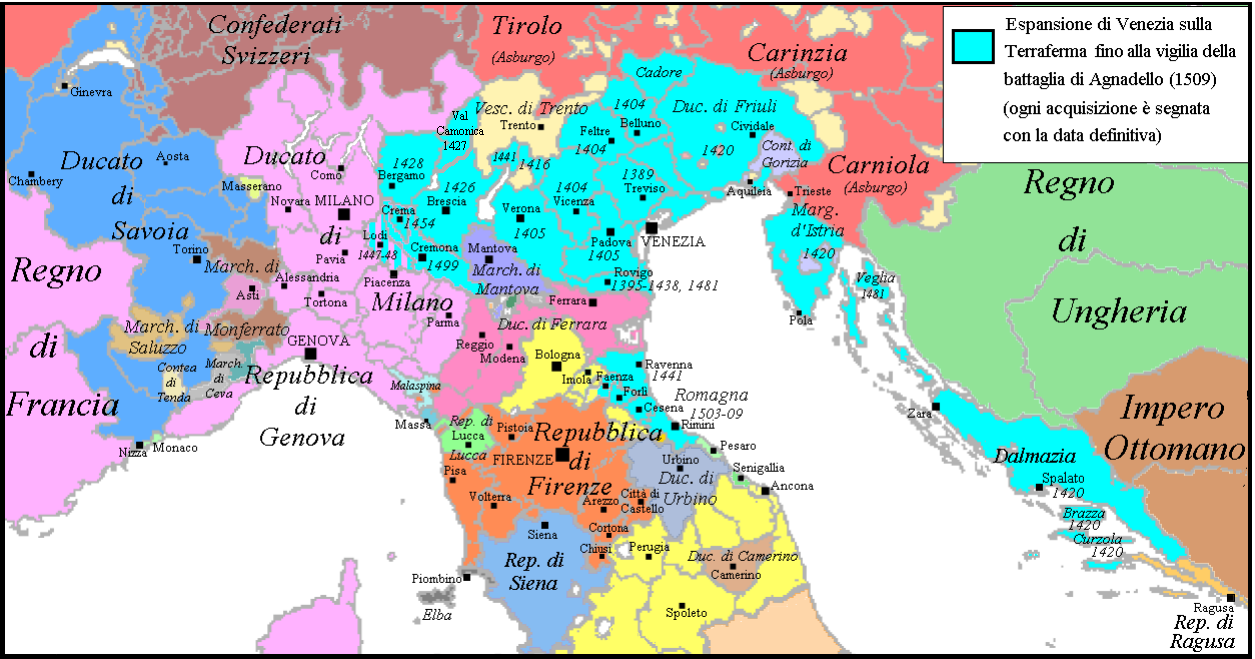
- Map of the expansion of the Republic of Venice in mainland Italy (Terraferma) in the 15th century
Date	25 April 1404 – 17 November 1405
Location	Veneto, northern Italy
Result	Venetian victory
Territorial changes	Annexation of the Carrarese lordship of Padua and other cities in the Veneto by Venice

Belligerents
Republic of Venice; Duchy of Milan; Lordship of Mantua	Lordship of Padua; Lordship of Ferrara

Commanders and leaders
(Republic of Venice) Malatesta IV Malatesta (Republic of Venice) Paolo Savelli (Republic of Venice) Carlo Zeno; Jacopo Dal Verme; Francesco I Gonzaga	Francesco II 'il Novello'; Niccolò III d'Este

The War of Padua was a conflict in 1404–1405 between the Republic of Venice and the Carrarese lordship of Padua. In the power vacuum produced by the death of the Duke of Milan, Gian Galeazzo Visconti, in 1402, Francesco II da Carrara endeavored to expand into the Veneto and capture cities held by Visconti troops. These designs alarmed Venice, which allied with Milan to counter the common threat posed by the Carrarese state, and for the first time adopted a policy of direct intervention in the affairs of its hinterland.

The war began with the Carrarese move against Verona and Vicenza in April 1404. While Verona was taken, Vicenza instead surrendered to Venice on 25 April 1404, thwarting Carrarese designs. A massive mobilization of the Republic's military capacities followed, with an army of 20,000 or more men assembled by summer. Despite stiff resistance by the Paduans and their Ferrarese allies, during the autumn of 1404 the Venetian forces proceeded to lay siege to Verona, advanced deep into Paduan territory, and contested control of the Polesine. In spring 1405, the Carrarese position began to deteriorate rapidly: Niccolò III d'Este took Ferrara out of the war, while on 22 June 1405, Verona rebelled and surrendered to the Venetian army. Padua itself finally fell to the Venetians on 17 November 1405. After the Venetian victory, the Carrara domains were incorporated into the Venetian state, marking the beginning of Venice's expansion in mainland Italy, while the Carrara family members were executed.

== Background: Venice and the Carrarase lordship ==
The Republic of Venice had encouraged the seizure of power by the Carrara family in Padua, hoping thus to gain a strong buffer state between themselves and the other Italian states, and for twenty years treated Padua as a sort of protectorate. However, Francesco I da Carrara (r. 1350–1388) turned against Venice, fighting a border war with the assistance of Hungary in 1372–1373, and allying with the Republic of Genoa in the War of Chioggia (1378–1381), which nearly extinguished the Venetian Republic.

Even after the ultimate Venetian victory in the War of Chioggia, Francesco I pursued a policy of expansion and encirclement of Venice. Allied to the Este lords of Ferrara in the west, he purchased Treviso from the Habsburgs, thereby threatening to cut Venice off from the trade routes leading over the Alps to Germany. Francesco I also interfered in the affairs of Patria del Friuli, aiming to gain influence on the Venetians' eastern flank. In 1388, Venice went as far as entering into an alliance with the ambitious Duke of Milan, Gian Galeazzo Visconti, in order to counter the Carrarese state: Francesco I was forced to resign, and Venice gained control of Treviso.

Padua itself fell briefly under Visconti rule, but in June 1390, with the backing of Florence and the tacit support of Venice, Francesco II 'il Novello' recovered control of the city. During the following years, Padua reverted to being a useful buffer between Venice and the expanding Visconti realm. Venice supported the smaller Lombard lordships against Visconti, managing to check the latter's ambitions without itself entering into war with Milan, while at the same time effectively transforming the smaller lordships into its own clients.

== Carrarese conflict with Milan ==
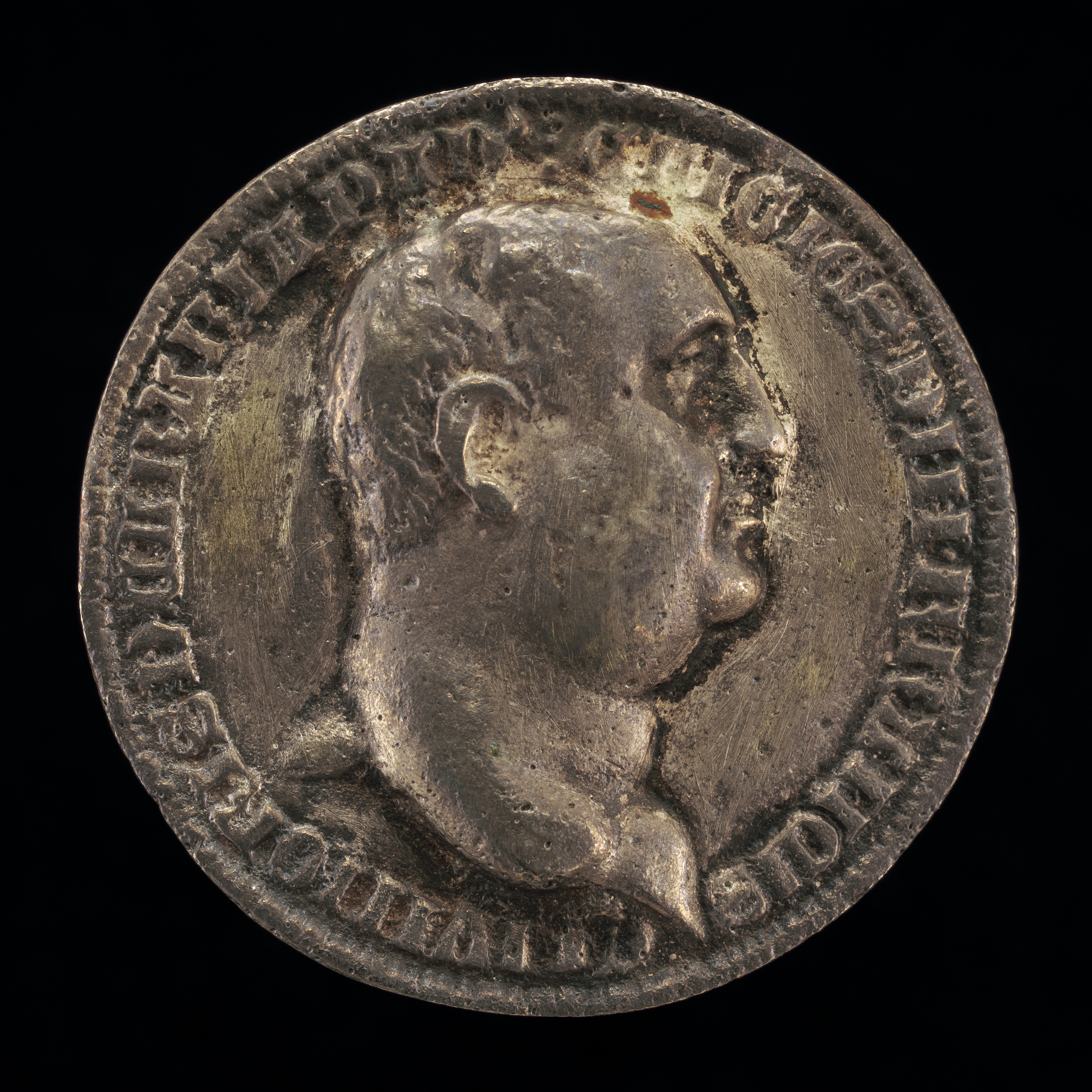
Medal with the bust of Francesco Novello, 1390

The situation lasted until the sudden death of Gian Galeazzo Visconti in September 1402. Up until that point, the Venetian Senate was deliberating sending troops to aid the Carrarese lordship against the Duke of Milan, who had recently triumphed in battle over his enemies at Casalecchio. Francesco Novello immediately exploited the weakened position of the Visconti regime, joining a Papal league against Milan and making contact with the anti-Milanese rebels in Brescia and Bergamo. However, Venice was opposed to these ventures, and forced Francesco to conclude a peace with Milan on 7 December.

Nevertheless, Francesco Novello could not for long resist the temptation to realise his ambitions, even against the clearly stated opposition of Venice. Encouraged by Florence and the local Guelph party, he captured Brescia on 21 August 1403, only to be forced to abandon the city to the advancing Visconti troops within a month. Francesco proposed an alliance to the Milanese regent, Caterina Visconti, in exchange for Vicenza, Feltre, Belluno and Bassano, but the proposal failed due to the opposition of the powerful Visconti condottiero, Jacopo dal Verme. Rebuffed, Francesco took to the offensive. Not even the unravelling of the anti-Visconti league of Italian lords following the withdrawal of the Pope and the King of Germany, Rupert, which effectively left him alone to face the might of Milan, gave him pause. In late 1403, the lord of Padua turned his sights on Verona and Vicenza, and secured the support of his son-in-law, Niccolò III d'Este, ruler of Ferrara.

== War between Padua and Venice ==
The prospect of such an expansion of Carrarese power alarmed Venice, whose policy up to this point had been one of maintaining the status quo by playing off the various local potentates against each other.

=== Diplomatic manoeuvres ===
As Francesco Novello's designs on Vicenza and Verona became apparent, an intense period of diplomatic and military activity ensued. In March 1404, Caterina Visconti sent an embassy to Venice to offer the two cities to the Republic, in exchange for an anti-Carrarese alliance. The embassy included Jacopo dal Verme, a fierce opponent of the Carrara, who even offered to serve Venice against the lord of Padua. A counter-embassy by Francesco Novello to the Venetian Senate failed to restore relations with the Republic.

=== Contest for Verona and Vicenza ===
Undeterred, on 27 March 1404, Francesco allied with Guglielmo della Scala, the heir to the Scaliger Lordship of Verona, aiming to capture Verona and Vicenza from Milan, with the former to be restored to the Scaliger, and the latter to come under Carrarese rule. Verona was captured by 8 April, and Guglielmo della Scala was acclaimed its lord two days later. With Verona secured, Francesco Novello left to oversee the siege of Vicenza.

Rather than be captured by the Carrarese forces, Vicenza chose to surrender itself to Venice instead. Venice hurried to accept the city's submission, and sent a token force of 25 crossbowmen that entered the city on 25 April 1404, followed a few days later by a larger force under Giacomo Soriano, a Venetian patrician. Reluctantly, Francesco Novello had to bow to a Venetian request and withdraw his forces from the siege. In the meantime, in Verona, Guglielmo della Scala died on 15 April, and on 25 May 1404, Francesco Novello deposed and arrested his two sons and claimed the lordship of Verona for himself.

=== Venetian mobilization ===
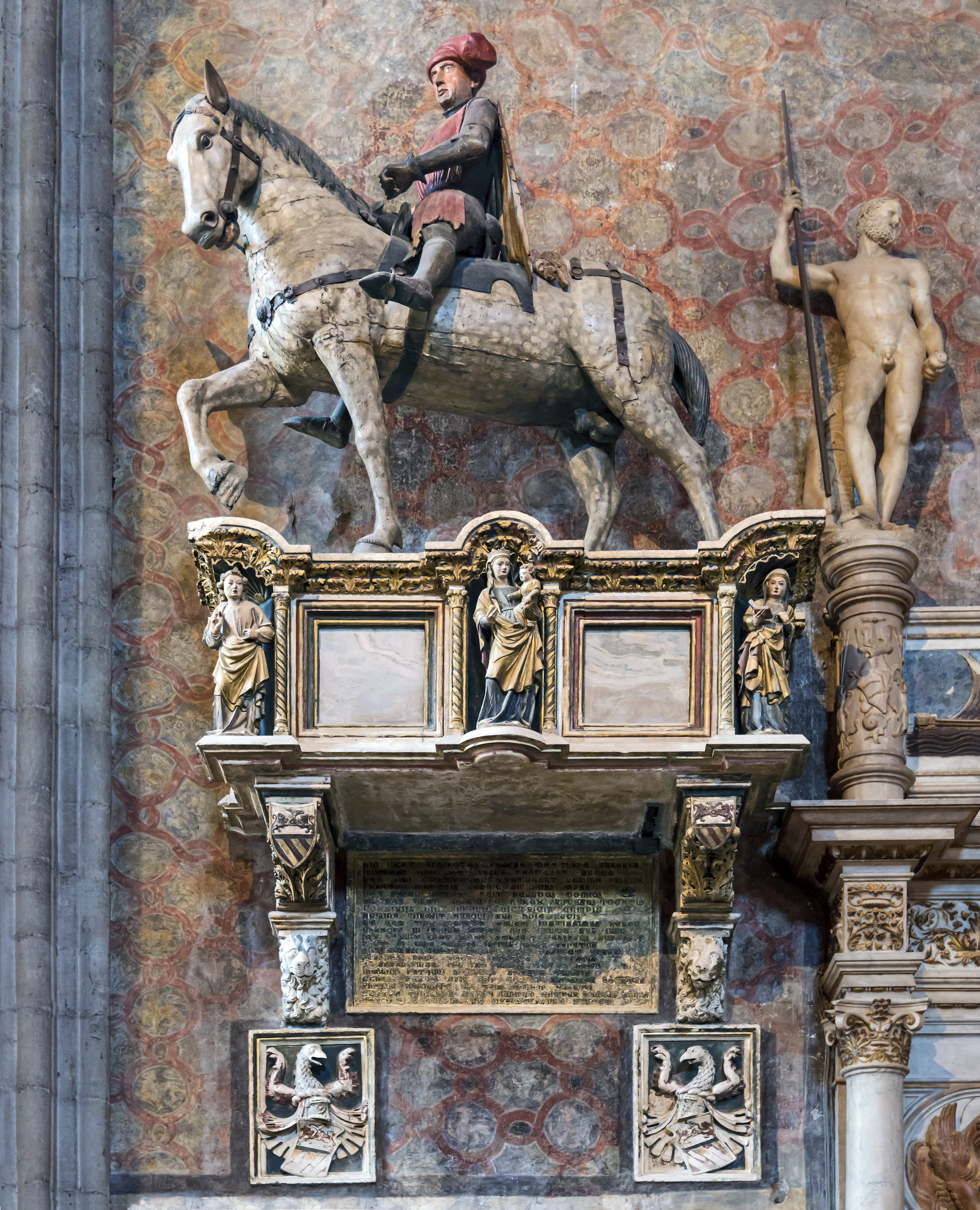
Paolo Savelli was the Venetian captain-general for most of the war, and died of plague during the siege of Padua. Funerary monument at the church of Santa Maria Gloriosa dei Frari, Venice

The events precipitated a sharp shift in Venetian policy, from 'soft' infiltration of neighbouring states, towards a direct imposition of the Republic's authority. Already in June 1403 the Great Council of Venice had prohibited Venetian citizens from receiving lands, titles, or offices from foreign potentates. The Republic now abandoned its traditional caution and reluctance to get militarily involved in mainland affairs. Amidst an atmosphere of general enthusiasm and determination to finish the Carrara off once and for all, the Republic began mobilizing its forces.

Troops were ferried from the Venetian dominions in Dalmatia and Crete, and condottieri captains were hired, notably Malatesta IV Malatesta, Paolo Savelli, Ottobuono Terzo, Taddeo dal Verme, Francesco dall'Aquila and Obizzo da Polenta. Jacopo dal Verme placed his own mercenary companies at the Republic's disposal, while Francesco I Gonzaga of Mantua was persuaded to enter Venetian service in exchange for Ostiglia and Peschiera. Malatesta was designated as captain-general of the Venetian land forces. Altogether, by late summer the Venetian army numbered over 19,000 men, while some sources claim that Venice had as many as 32,000 men under arms. Paduan chroniclers record that the Venetian force was the largest seen in Italy since the wars of Frederick Barbarossa against the Lombard League in the 12th century, and that the Republic spent the vast sum of 120,000 gold ducats per month for their upkeep.

The exact numbers are impossible to ascertain, especially since the Venetian forces operated in separate groups in different directions: against Verona, against Padua, and in the Polesine (backed by a fleet of eight galleys) against the Ferrarese.

=== Venetian operations in summer and autumn 1404 ===
Venice quickly proceeded to extend its rule over Belluno (on 18 May 1404), Bassano (on 10 June) and Feltre (on 15 June). Efforts by Florence to mediate between the two powers in June failed. At the same time, however, Florence was not prepared to intervene on behalf of the Carrarese, being focused on its subjugation of its rival, Pisa. Indeed, the major powers that might have intervened on behalf of Francesco Novello and threatened Venice's rear—the King of Germany, the Habsburg Dukes of Austria, and the King of Hungary, Sigismund—were otherwise occupied, leaving the Carrarese lordship isolated, apart from the alliance with Ferrara.

The first battle of the war, at Limena on 25 September 1404, was a victory for the Paduan–Ferrarese forces, leading to the dismissal of Malatesta and the appointment of Paolo Savelli as Venetian captain-general. Venice recovered quickly, and in October launched attacks in three directions simultaneously: Verona was placed under siege, Rovigo in the Polesine was captured, and Savelli launched a campaign that by late December bought his troops to gates of Padua itself. The Venetian advance was not unopposed, however, as the Carrarese forces traded blow for blow: Venetian gains were often quickly reverted, the eastern approaches to Padua were covered by an extensive network of defences, and Paduan and Ferrarese forces managed to evict the Venetian garrisons from the Polesine.

=== Peace with Ferrara, surrender of Verona to Venice ===
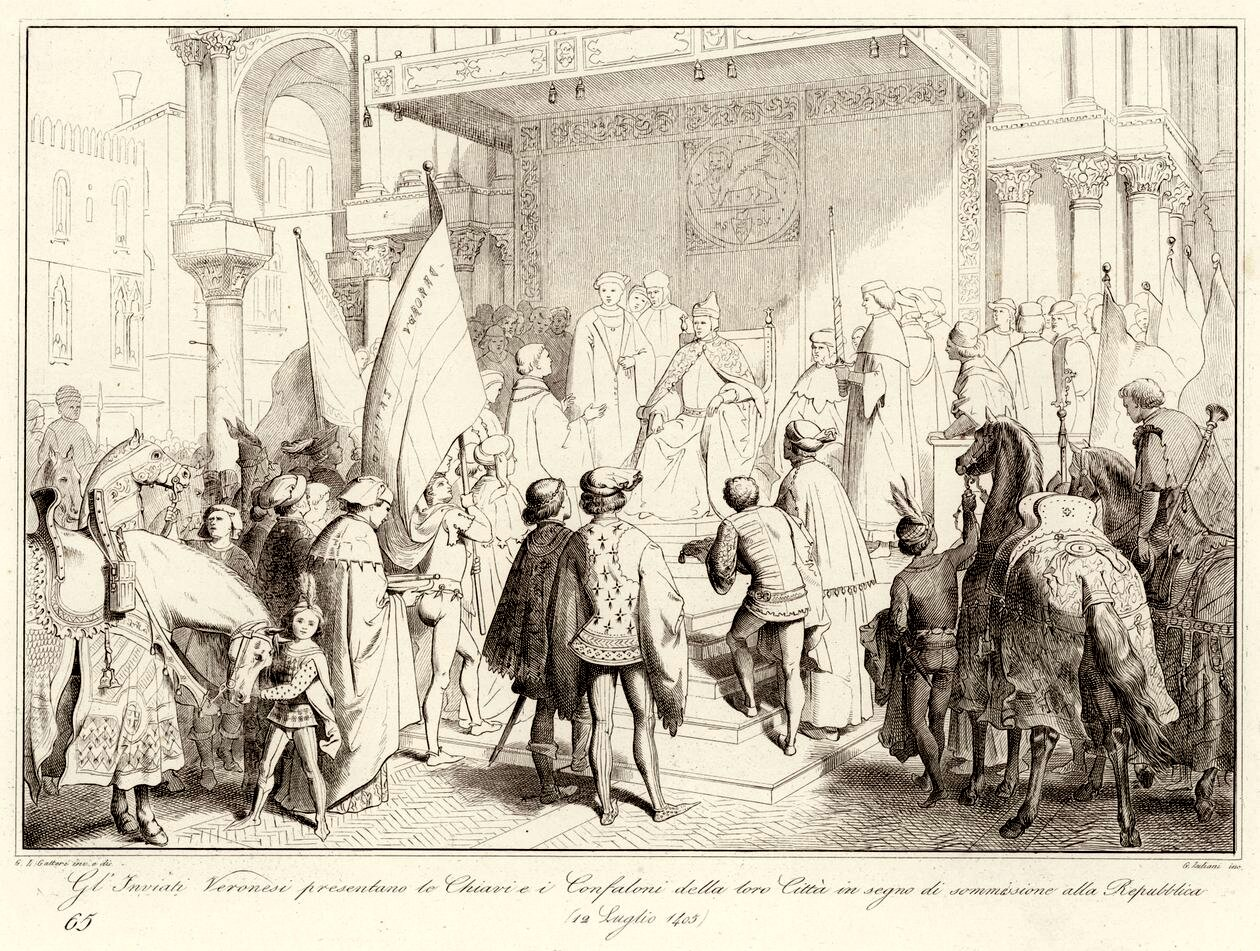
Depiction of the "Devotion of Verona to Venice", by Giuseppe Lorenzo Gatteri

Another Florentine attempt to mediate a peace failed in January, 1405 and in March, the constant menace posed by the Venetian fleet and troops to Ferrara forced Niccolò III d'Este to conclude a pact with Venice, renouncing his claims on the Polesine. The Carrarese position began to crumble, as the Venetian forces reduced the Paduan defences, and lack of funds forced Francesco Novello to demobilize his cavalry. Francesco sent his family members to safety in Florence, while his half-brother Jacopo concluded a secret pact with Venice to hand over Padua to the Republic.

On 26 May 1405, the strategic fortress at Castelcaro Basso fell to the Venetians, opening the Paduan heartland up to direct attack. On 22 June, the citizens of Verona rose in revolt, forcing its governor, Francesco Novello's son Jacopo, to seek refuge in the citadel, and to accept the city's surrender to the besieging Venetian forces. The city was occupied the next day, and the formal surrender took place at Venice on 12 July.

=== Fall of Padua ===
The surrender of Verona left the Venetians free to concentrate their forces against Padua. Conditions in the city quickly became unbearable in the summer heat, as the city was crowded with refugees from the surrounding countryside, the Venetians managed to cut off the water supply, and a plague broke out. In August 1405, Francesco Carrara tried to negotiate a favourable peace, but this was rejected by the Venetians. The counter-proposals by the Venetian commander Carlo Zeno were also rejected as rumours of Florentine assistance encouraged the Paduans to resist.

The Venetian commander-in-chief, Paolo Savelli, died of plague before the city, but this did not stop the progress of the siege. In October, the Venetians launched attacks from four different directions. One by one the remaining Paduan fortresses fell, and inside the city walls, increasing desperation led to popular unrest and plots to surrender the city or open its gates. Even Francesco Novello's namesake son pressed his father to surrender. On 16 November 1405, Francesco Novello bowed to pressure and promised to surrender the city within ten days, but on the very next day the Venetian troops managed to enter the city from the gate of San Croce after bribing the guards and occupied the city.

Francesco Novello offered to capitulate and went in person to the Venetian camp, but the Venetian Senate pointedly ignored him and his envoys. They instead accepted the surrender of the citizens of Padua on 22 November 1405.

== Aftermath ==
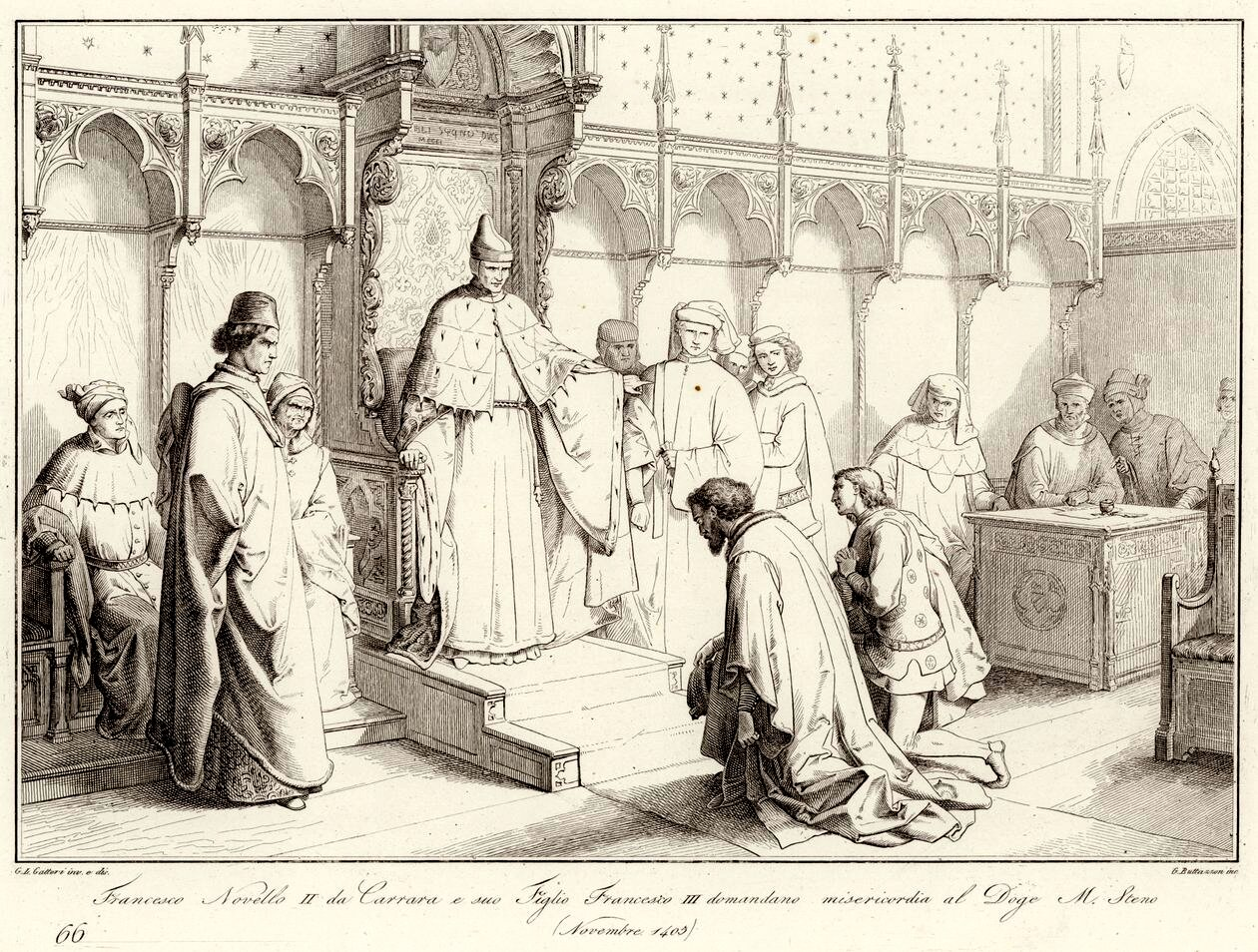
Francesco Novello and his son plead for clemency before Doge Michele Steno, drawing by Giuseppe Lorenzo Gatteri

After the surrender of Padua, Francesco Novello and his namesake son were brought to Venice on 23 November 1405. They were imprisoned in the Doge's Palace, where they found Jacopo, the former governor of Verona. The Venetian Senate debated long over their fate, with proposals ranging from imprisonment to exile in Crete or Cyprus. In the end, by decree of the Council of Ten, the three remaining members of the Carrara family were judged to be too dangerous to be left alive: Francesco Novello was strangled on 17 January 1406, and his two sons followed a few days later.

This drastic act was unusual, as the Venetians normally pensioned off the ruling families of cities that submitted to them; however the Carrara were perceived as traitors, having been once allies of Venice and honoured with entry into the Venetian nobility. Furthermore, they were suspected of plans to poison the city's water supply, and there was considerable outrage as their captured account books showed that they had bribed Venetian nobles to serve as spies. As a result, the Carrara were hated by the Venetian populace; news of their execution were acknowledged with the comment that "dead men wage no wars". The Venetian authorities went a step further and also destroyed the family's monuments in Padua.

The annexations during the War of Padua extended Venetian rule to the Mincio river and the eastern shore of Lake Garda in the west, and almost to the Po River in the south, comprising a large territorial state. It was soon followed by expansion eastwards, in Friuli and Dalmatia. These territories were disputed with the Holy Roman Empire, which still claimed suzerainty over northern Italy, and Hungary. The King of Hungary, Sigismund, also became Holy Roman Emperor in 1410, and denounced the Venetian mainland state as illegitimate, upholding the claims of the previous dynastic families, the Scaligers and Carrara, who had been Imperial vicars of their cities. Venice was thus an enemy of the Empire. The Republic prevailed in this conflict, and by 1437 even Sigismund had to concede an Imperial vicariate to the Doge Francesco Foscari, thus legitimizing their control over the Veneto–albeit an exception was made for the old Scaliger cities of Verona and Vicenza. Venice's expansion also coincided with the consolidation of the Visconti Duchy of Milan, and the rise of Florence to dominance in Tuscany, thus leaving northern Italy effectively divided between these three powers, setting the stage for a series of conflicts between Venice and Milan over control of Lombardy.

== Sources ==
- Canzian, Dario (2007). "L'assedio di Padova del 1405" [The siege of Padua in 1405]. Reti Medievali Rivista (in Italian). VIII: 1–25. doi:10.6092/1593-2214/133. ISSN 1593-2214.
- Ganguzza Billanovich, Maria Chiara (1977). "CARRARA, Francesco da, il Novello". Dizionario Biografico degli Italiani (in Italian). Vol. 20: Carducci–Carusi. Rome: Istituto dell'Enciclopedia Italiana. ISBN 978-88-12-00032-6.
- Kohl, Benjamin G. (1998). Padua under the Carrara, 1318–1405. Baltimore and London: Johns Hopkins University Press. ISBN 0-8018-5703-1.
- Lane, Frederic Chapin (1973). Venice: A Maritime Republic. Baltimore, Maryland: Johns Hopkins University Press. ISBN 0-8018-1445-6.
- Mallett, Michael E. (1996). "La conquista della Terraferma". Storia di Venezia dalle origini alla caduta della Serenissima. Vol. IV, Il rinascimento: politica e cultura (in Italian). Rome: Istituto della Enciclopedia Italiana. pp. 181–240. OCLC 644711024.
- Pellegrini, Marco (2022). Venezia e la Terraferma (in Italian). Bologna: Il Mulino. ISBN 978-88-15-29541-5.
