= Battle of Chioggia =

1380 naval battle

- Part of the War of Chioggia
| Date | June 24, 1380 |
| Location | Chioggia, Venetian Lagoon |
| Result | Venetian victory |

Belligerents
| Republic of Genoa | Republic of Venice |

Commanders and leaders
| Pietro Doria †; Matteo Maruffo | Carlo Zeno; Vettor Pisani; Doge Andrea Contarini |

Strength
| 23 galleys under Pietro Doria; Genoese reinforcements | 34 galleys under Pisani and Contarini, 14 galleys under Zeno |

Casualties and losses
| Destruction of much of the Genoese fleet 4,000 men captured 17 galleys captured | _ |

The Battle of Chioggia was a naval battle during the War of Chioggia that culminated on June 24, 1380 in the lagoon off Chioggia, Italy, between the Venetian and the Genoese fleets. The Genoese, commanded by Admiral Pietro Doria, had captured the little fishing port in August the preceding year.

The port was of no consequence, but its location at an inlet to the Venetian Lagoon threatened Venice at her very doorstep. The Venetians, under Vettor Pisani and Doge Andrea Contarini, were victorious thanks in part to the fortunate arrival of Carlo Zeno at the head of a force from the east. The Venetians both captured the town and turned the tide of the war in their favor. A peace treaty signed in 1381 in Turin gave no formal advantage to Genoa or Venice, but it spelled the end of their long competition: Genoese shipping was not seen in the Adriatic Sea after Chioggia. This battle was also significant in the technologies used by the combatants.

== Background ==
By the fourteenth century, interregional trade had seen a very large increase, aided in part by improved navigational and naval technologies as well as by the collapsing Byzantine empire. The northern Italian cities of Genoa and Venice were well placed to foster this trade that extended east through the Mediterranean to Constantinople, the Middle East, and the Black Sea, as well as north through the Strait of Gibraltar to the Baltic Sea. Common goods that were traded in the region included timber, metals, weapons, slaves, salt, spices, and grain. Grain from the Black Sea region became increasingly important to feed the growing urban populace of the city-states and support the growing naval merchant class, with most grain imports coming through the ports at Caffa in modern-day Crimea and Chios in the eastern Aegean Sea. Throughout this period both Genoa and Venice became ever more entrenched in trade, building considerable naval forces to protect their interests and battling for trade dominance in a series of sporadic wars that largely culminated with Chioggia.

== Lead-up to the battle ==
Since 1372, Venice and Genoa had been engaged along with their respective allies in the War of Chioggia, the fourth Genoese War. In 1378, when full-scale hostilities occurred in earnest, Venetian Captain General of the Sea Vettor Pisani was sent with a fleet of 14 galleys to attack Genoese waters. It is worth noting that throughout the War of Chioggia, the sizes of the fleet of both sides were relatively small compared to other wars. This is a sign that the plagues and general slump of the mid-fourteenth century had weakened both cities.

After some moderately successful campaigning, Pisani requested to return home to refit his ships but was denied by the Venetian leadership. He was ordered to spend the winter near Pola in modern Croatia. There he was led into a trap by an attacking Genoese fleet in which he was outnumbered and saw most of his fleet destroyed.

The Genoese pressed their advantage and sent their force towards Venice, burning towns and capturing ships as they went along the Lido. In August 1379, they, along with an allied force from Padua, moved into the Venetian Lagoon and captured the small port of Chioggia, right at the doorstep of Venice itself.

== Battle ==
After the loss of Chioggia, Venice asked the Genoese to negotiate, but they replied that they would only do so after they had “bridled the horses of San Marco”. Apparently they intended to attack Venice, but decided to secure themselves at Chioggia for fear of navigating the lagoon. Venice responded by mobilizing every resource it could muster, using forced loans and mass conscription to assemble and arm a force of galleys 34 strong.

Pisani, who had been imprisoned for his crushing defeat at Pola, was released after crowds took to the streets demanding that he be put back in command. He served as executive officer under the Doge himself, who took command as Captain General. After training the new conscripts, who were mostly craftsmen, the new fleet executed Pisani's plan to turn the besieging Genoese into the besieged.

On the night of December 22, the Venetian force sunk barges laden with stones in the canals and channels leading to the lagoon, blocking the supply lines and escape of the Genoese occupying Chioggia. The Venetian ships could more readily navigate the smaller canals, and so they blocked the larger ones, using a small land force at Chioggia as a distraction while they worked. The Venetians spent the next five months struggling to defend the barriers from Genoese attacks, while the Genoese's supplies dwindled. Carlo Zeno, who had been using his force of 14 well-equipped galleys to capture undefended Genoese ships in the east, arrived in January, greatly bolstering the Venetians’ efforts. Gradually they secured every entrance to the lagoon.

The Genoese sent reinforcements to aid their force in Chioggia, but the Venetians would not let them past their barriers, preventing them from entering the battle and dividing the Genoese force. After the starving Genoese in Chioggia unsuccessfully attempted to bribe the Venetian mercenaries into their service, they surrendered on June 24, 1380. Despite the victory at Chioggia, the Venetians then had to battle the rest of the Genoese forces until the Peace of Turin in 1381.

== Technology ==
The primary mode of naval warfare during this time in the Mediterranean was the galley ship, although its variants were also increasingly used as trade ships. Its design effectively balanced carrying capacity and speed to create a ship well suited to many purposes. These were the main ships of war used during the battle, with the exception of the barges sunk by Venice to blockade their lagoon.

This battle is of additional note because it was the first recorded use of ship-mounted gunpowder weapons being used in combat in Europe. The Venetians, who were already using gunpowder siege weapons on land, mounted small bombards to many of their galleys during the fight to keep the Genoese force cordoned off in Chioggia. Although there is little known about these weapons, it is known that they were not used for ship-to-ship combat. The weapons were far too inaccurate to be used against other ships, and instead were used to bombard enemy walls and fortifications. The Genoese commander, Pietro Doria, was killed by a collapsing fortification that was hit by a ball fired from a Venetian galley.

== Aftermath ==
At the Peace of Turin, Venice made several concessions to the Genoese, including Tenedos, the original source of contention in the war. Nevertheless, the Genoese stopped their military and trade forays into most of the Mediterranean, perhaps as a result of their defeat combined with debts and domestic civil unrest. Venice too was left with a great deal of debt, but crawled slowly out of it over the next few decades.

Fernand Braudel sets the end of sporadic warfare between the two early centers of aquatic empire as a result of the economic retrenchment of the 14th century: "Perhaps the answer is that only prolonged prosperity and a rising tide of trade had made it possible to indulge for so long in battles which were fierce but not in the end mortal... Both major and minor wars had become too expensive a luxury. Peaceful coexistence would have to be the rule."

Left with no major enemies, Venice expanded its power along both Adriatic coasts, posting a fleet at Corfu to guard the sea's entrance. They increased their trade influence on the Greek Peloponnesus and greatly extended inland at home. By 1400, Venice had 3000 ships, and in a population of 200,000 had 38,000 seamen. Venice's system of aquatic economic domination is one that continued to surface even after its decline, with an example being Portugal's later domination of the seas around Africa and Asia.
