= Michele Morosini =

Doge of Venice in 1382

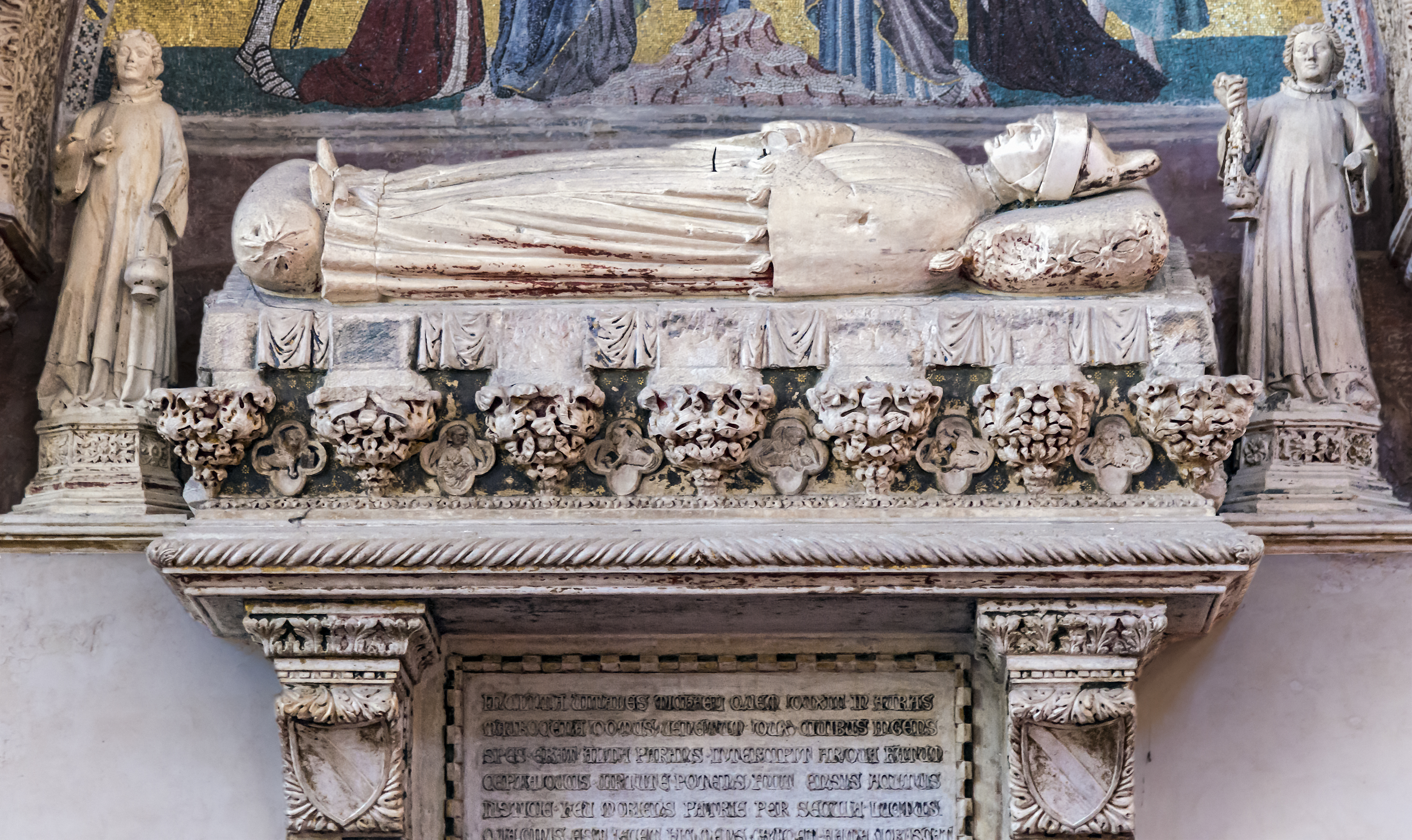
- His tomb in San Zanipolo.

Doge of Venice
- In office 10 June – 16 October 1382
- Preceded by: Andrea Contarini
- Succeeded by: Antonio Venier

Personal details
- Born: 1308
- Died: 16 October 1382 (aged 73–74)

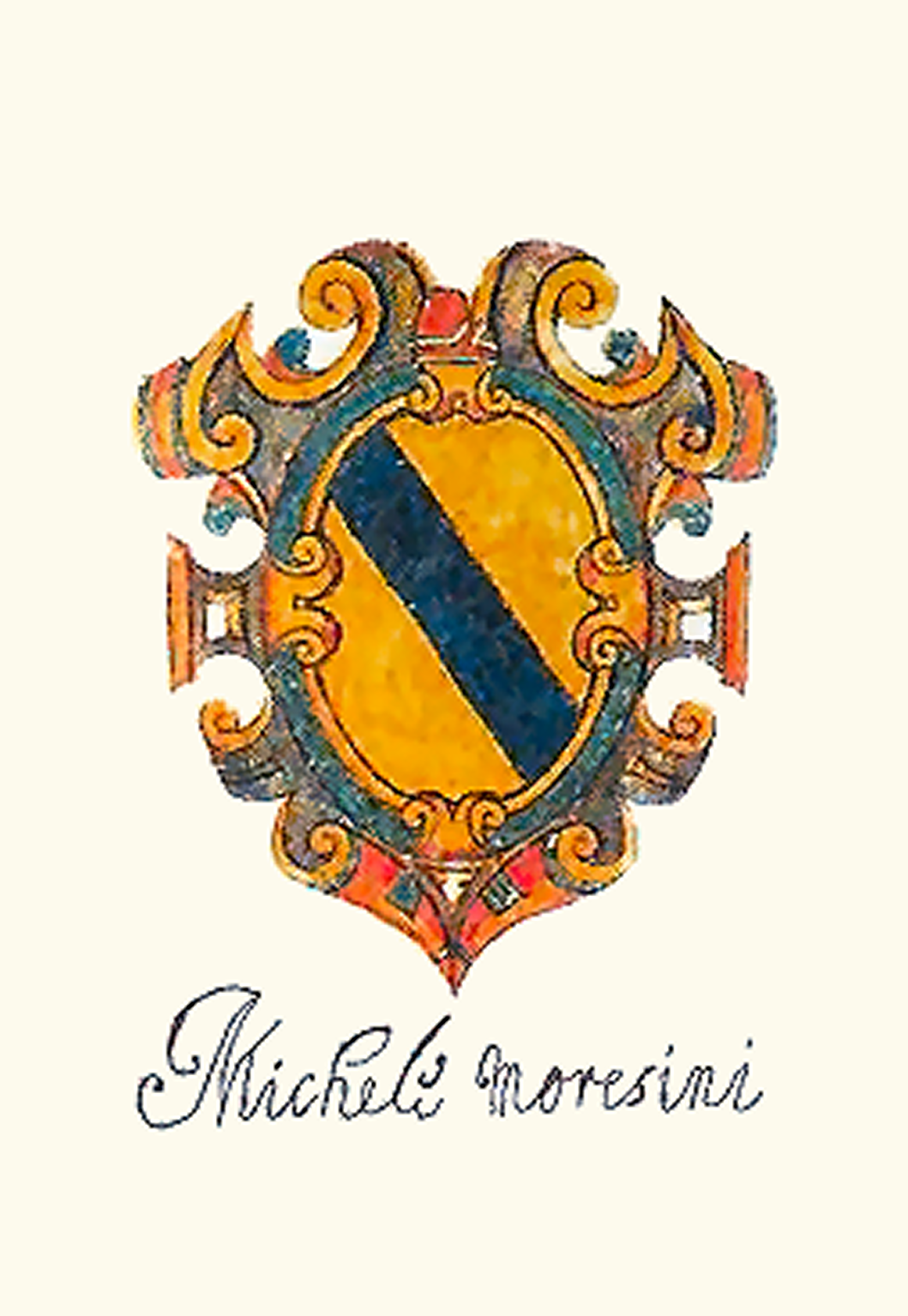
Coat of arms of Michele Morosini

Michele Morosini (1308 – 16 October 1382) was the 61st Doge of Venice, serving just 4 months from 10 June 1382 until his death on 16 October the same year.

Born in one of the most important Venetian families, Morosini was extremely wealthy. Opinions about him are varied, though, and he is seen either as a devoted servant of the Republic, or as a speculator who enriched himself on real estate during the hard times of the War of Chioggia, fought between Venice and Genoa between 1378 and 1381.

Elected after the death of Doge Andrea Contarini, he died very soon of the plague and was buried in the church of San Zanipolo, a traditional burial place of the doges. He was married to Cristina Condulmiero.

His statue (number 31) is erected in the outer ring in the southeast quarter of the Prato della Valle in Padua.

Political offices
Preceded by Andrea Contarini	Doge of Venice; 1382	Succeeded by Antonio Venier
