= Carlo Zeno =

Italian admiral

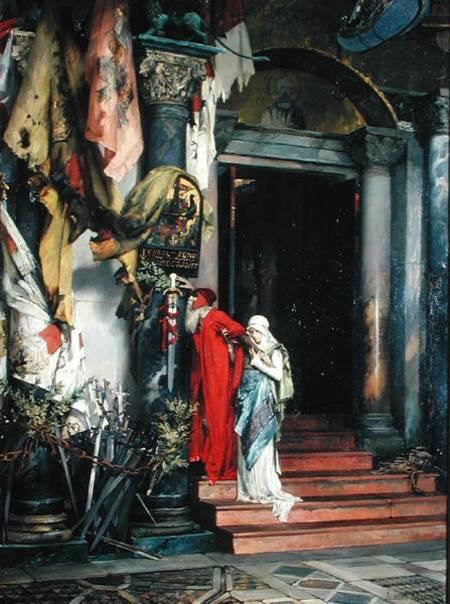
"Admiral Carlo Zeno" by Albert Maignan, 1878. (Lille, Palais des Beaux-Arts.)

Carlo Zeno (or Zen) (1333 – 8 March 1418) was a Venetian admiral who is considered a hero of the War of Chioggia against the Republic of Genoa.

== Early life ==
Destined for an ecclesiastical career, Zeno studied at Padua, but dedicated himself instead to pursuing women and the good life. He thus ran out of money and enlisted in a band of mercenaries, returning to Venice after four or five years.

== Career ==
While at Patras, the city was attacked by Turkish forces. Zeno distinguished himself in battle, but later made himself a hunted man after he killed a Christian knight with whom he had an argument.

He traveled to Constantinople, was married, and lived like a merchant. He was at Tenedos, a Venetian possession, when it was attacked by the Genoese. As the bailiff and captain of Negropont, Zeno found himself in command of eighteen galleys, which he employed in raiding expeditions in the Mediterranean.

Carlo Zeno had long since been ordered to return to Venice, but the slowness and difficulty of communication and movement under 14th century conditions delayed his reappearance. He returned to Venice with this fleet on 1 January 1380, just in time to save the city in the pivotal Battle of Chioggia. The battle took place in June 1380 in the lagoon off Chioggia, resulting in a victory for Venice. The Genoese surrender allowed the Venetians to regain control of the Adriatic.

In 1400, he was considered as a candidate for the office of doge, but Michele Steno was elected instead. In October 1403, as captain-general of the Sea, he led the Venetians to a victory over the Genoese in the Battle of Modon. In 1405, as commander of the Venetian army, Zeno and the Venetians overthrew the ruling Carraresi family of Padua. During the course of this attack, the 72-year-old Zeno heroically led his men across a river through water up to his neck. But on his return to Venice he was in for a shock when the Venetian bureaucracy began poring through the Paduan account ledgers, they discovered an entry apparently recording a payment to Zeno.

== Later life ==
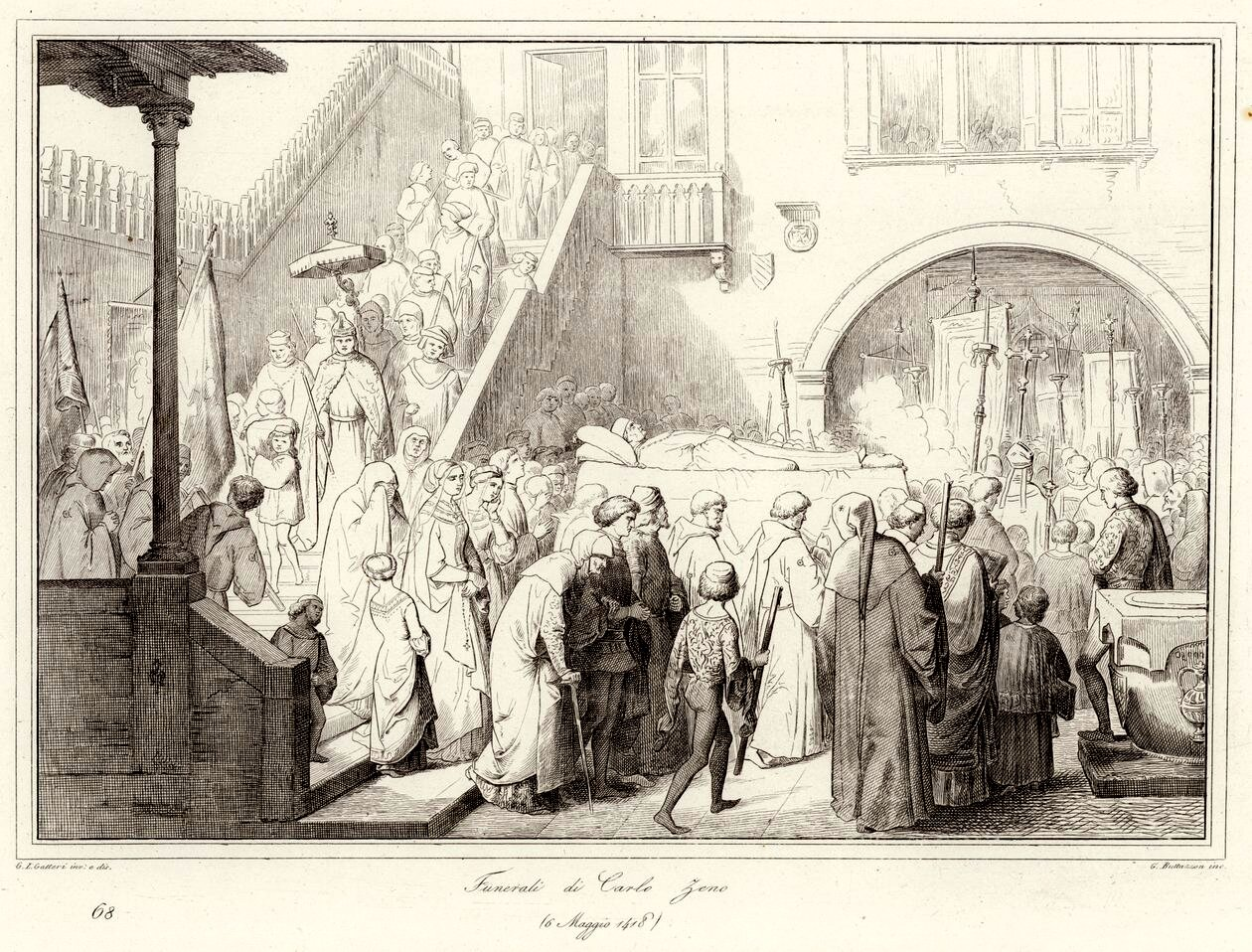
Funeral of Carlo Zeno

Charged with treason, he was called before the council of 10 which stripped him of all his offices and sentenced him to a year in prison. His career compromised, Zeno then traveled throughout the Mediterranean as a mercenary-for-hire and married again (he was thrice widowed). He returned to Venice aging and infirm and died in 1418 at the age of 85. He was given a public funeral, which was attended in large numbers by the genuinely grateful Venetian people.

== In literature ==
Carlo Zeno is the protagonist of Gabriele D'Annunzio's 1908 tragedy La nave. D'Annunzio used the character of the Medieval admiral as a vehicle to glorify modern Italian nationalism and specifically promote the creation of a strong Italian sea power. In 1921 it was adapted into a film directed by D'Annunzio's son Gabriellino D'Annunzio.
