= Paolo Savelli =

13th-century Italian condottiero

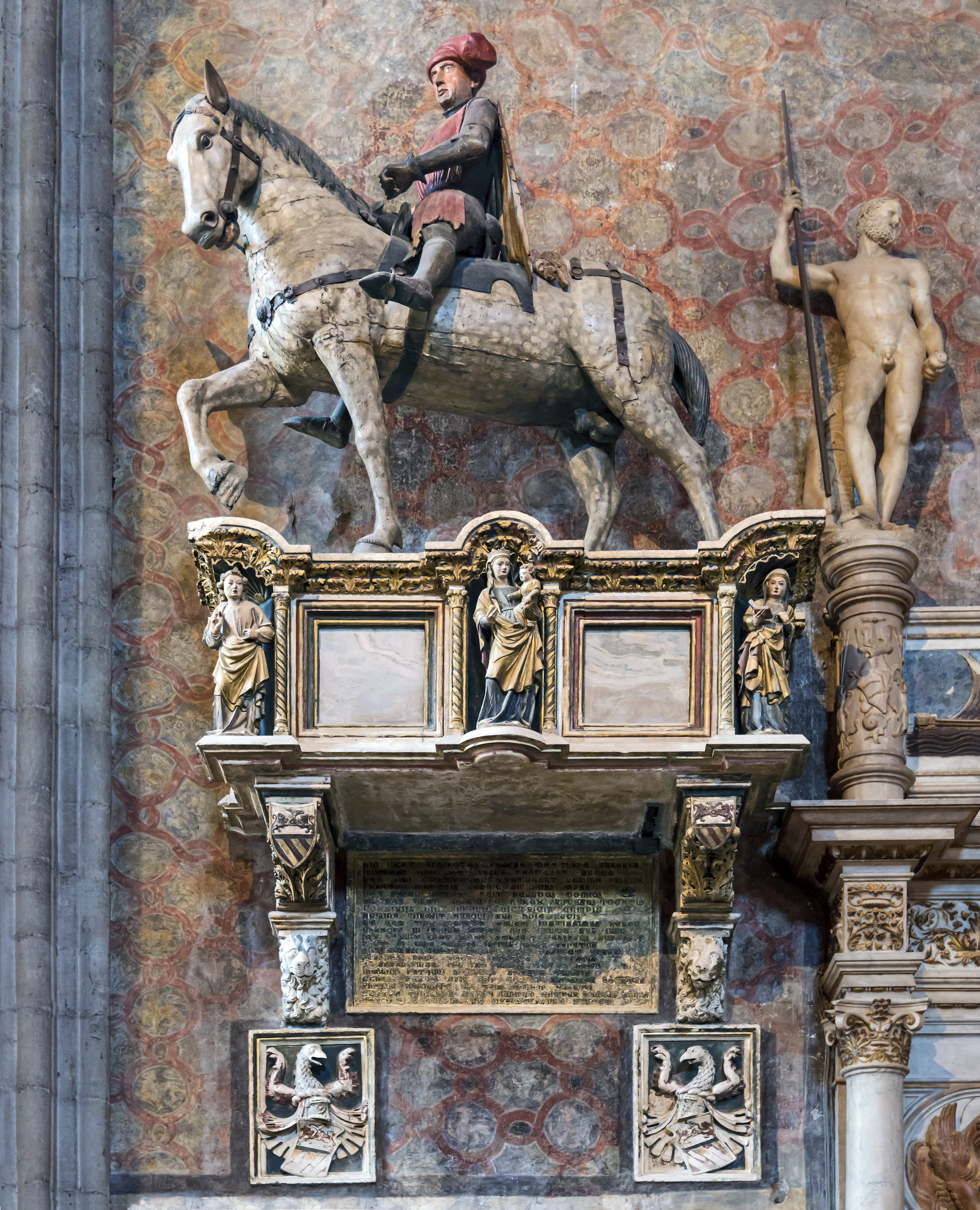
Funerary monument at the church of Santa Maria Gloriosa dei Frari, Venice

Paolo Savelli (died 3 October 1405) was an Italian condottiero who served under Alberico da Barbiano in the Papal States and the Kingdom of Naples, before entering the service of the Duchy of Milan in its wars with Florence. He finally served the Republic of Venice as its commander-in-chief during the War of Padua, dying of the plague during the final siege of Padua.

== Life ==
Paolo Savelli was born around the middle of the 14th century to the Roman aristocrat Luca Savelli, and his Paduan wife Lieta da Carrara. The exact time and place of his birth are unknown.

=== Under Alberico da Barbiano ===
He began his career in the troops hired by his own father, and then joined the mercenary company of Alberico da Barbiano, fighting with distinction on behalf of Pope Urban VI against Antipope Clement VII. In 1381–84 he joined Alberico to fight under Charles of Durazzo against the latter's cousin, Queen Joanna of Naples.

=== In Milanese service ===
After that, Savelli became himself a condottiero captain, entering the service of Gian Galeazzo Visconti, the ruler of Milan, in 1388. Visconti sent him to support his allies in central Italy, aiding Siena against Montepulciano and the company of John Hawkwood, which was in the pay of Florence. In 1389 he was in Perugia, to prop up the local pro-Visconti noble faction against the pro-Florentine commoners. In 1390 he besieged Agello, held by the commoners, and after open war broke out between Milan and Florence, employed his men in the Val di Chiana. His results were poor, however, and in October Visconti recalled him to Milan.

In 1391 Savelli was back in Siena to take over command of the city, which in March of the same year had accepted Milanese rule. He was not very successful in stopping Florentine raids in the area. In 1392 he joined the army of the Visconti commander Jacopo Del Verme, and fought in the Battle of Soncino.

In 1394, Savelli returned to Rome, where he allied himself with Giovanni Colonna, the lord of Palestrina. On 24 July 1394 the two men tried to stage a coup by riding to the Capitoline Hill, but the attempt failed to gain any support.

In September 1395 he attended the ceremony of investiture of Gian Galeazzo Visconti as Duke of Milan and imperial vicar. In 1396–97, along with other Visconti commanders, he was again active in Tuscany in the conflict against Florence (although war was not officially declared until 18 March 1397) and in propping up the pro-Visconti regime in Pisa. In summer 1397 he participated in the attempt to capture Mantua, and fought in the unsuccessful Battle of Governolo in August, before returning to Siena in autumn to resume the expeditions against Florence and to support Jacopo d'Appiano, the lord of Pisa. Nevertheless, in January–February 1398 he was arrested by d'Appiano, after Visconti agents tried to have the fortresses of Pisa and other Tuscan cities handed over.

In June 1402 he played a major role in the Visconti victory in the Battle of Casalecchio against Giovanni I Bentivoglio, the lord of Bologna and close ally of Florence. Following the death of Gian Galeazzo Visconti in September, Savelli entered the regency council under the duchess dowager, Caterina Visconti, but he clashed with the other members and left it soon after. In May 1403 he participated in the defence of Bologna against Florentine and Papal troops, and remained in the city after the conclusion of the Peace of Caledio in August 1403, supporting the local faction of the Maltraversi. In the same autumn, he fought in the suppression of the uprising of Asola.

=== In Venetian service ===
In April 1404, Savelli entered the service of the Republic of Venice, which at that time was mobilizing its forces for a conflict with the Lordship of Padua.

His record during the war was mixed: he was defeated by the Paduans at Gambarare in summer, and again at Limena on 25 September, where he fought in person against the Lord of Padua, Francesco Novello. Nevertheless, his standing with Venice did not suffer, and shortly after he was appointed captain-general of the Venetian forces in succession to Malatesta IV Malatesta.

In late autumn, after feinting retreat, he bypassed the Paduan fortifications, crossed the Brenta River, and with his forces pillaged the rich region around Piove di Sacco, before returning to winter in Venetian territory. The Republic ordered public celebrations and doubled his salary as a result. During the following months, he avoided conflict and tried to bribe the Paduan army commanders, with some success. In May 1405 he captured the strategic fortress of Castelcaro Basso, and penetrated into the system of canals surrounding Padua.

After capturing Bassanello, southwest of Padua, in July, he set up his camp there, and began the siege of the city itself. He was attacked and driven from his positions by the Paduans on 25 August. A short truce followed, in which Savelli participated in the negotiations with Francesco Novello, without success. When the fighting resumed, he fell ill with the plague and died on 3 October 1405.

=== Death and burial ===
His body was brought to Venice for a funeral on 15 October, and he was buried in the church of Santa Maria Gloriosa dei Frari in a tomb featuring an equestrian statue of him, in his full habit as captain-general, attributed to Iacopo della Quercia.

== Sources ==
- Brunelli, Giampiero (2017). "SAVELLI, Paolo". Dizionario Biografico degli Italiani (in Italian). Vol. 90: Salvestrini–Saviozzo da Siena. Rome: Istituto dell'Enciclopedia Italiana. ISBN 978-88-12-00032-6.
