= Andrea Contarini =

Doge of Venice from 1367 to 1382

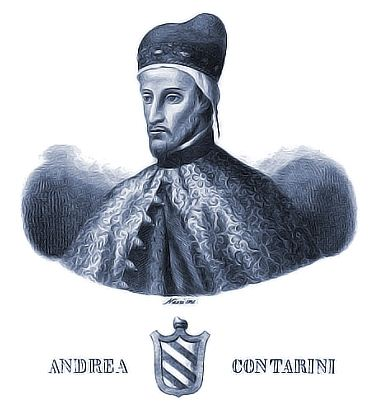

Doge of Venice
- In office 1367–1382
- Preceded by: Marco Cornaro
- Succeeded by: Michele Morosini

Personal details
- Born: c. 1300/1302
- Died: 5 June 1382

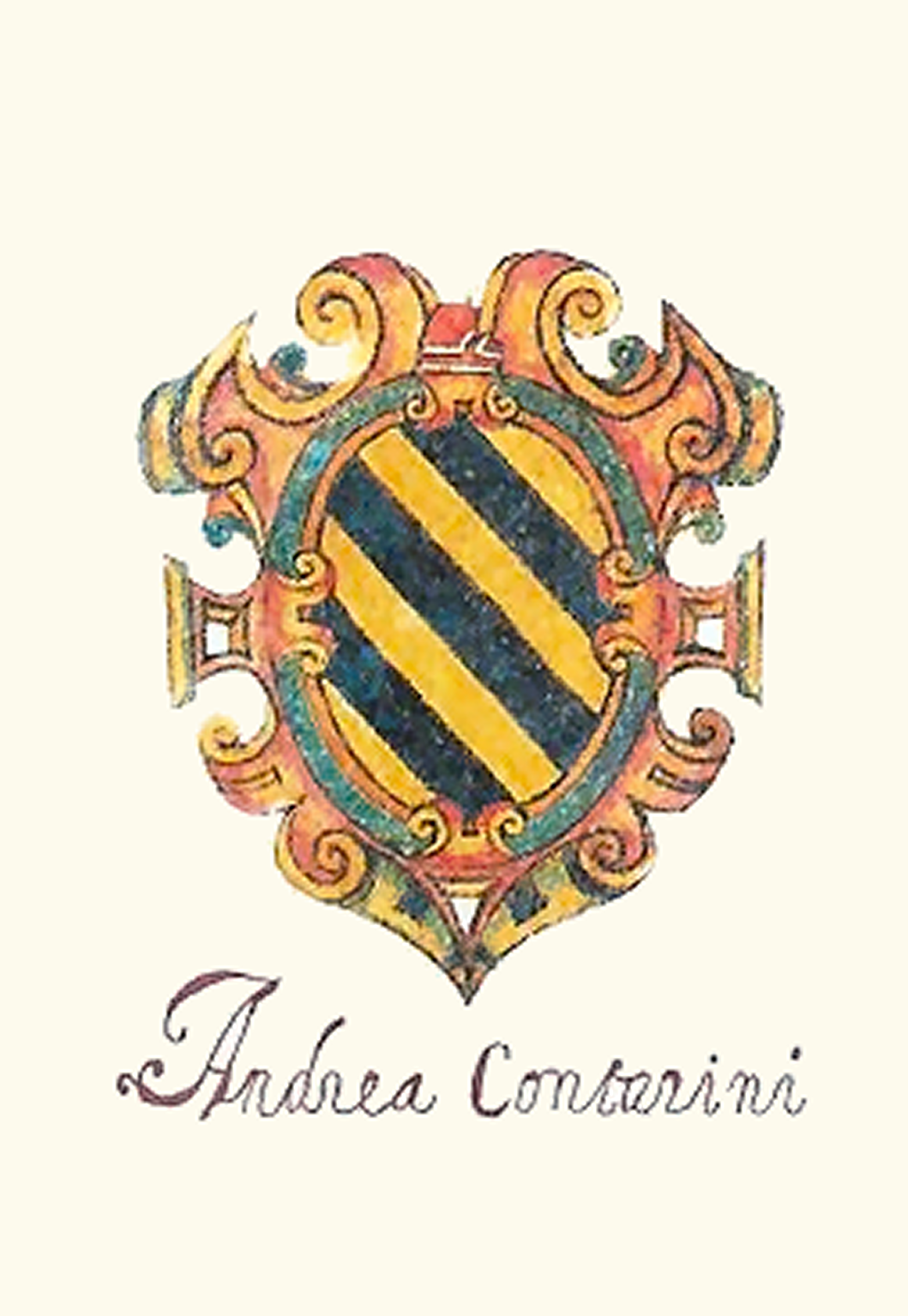
Coat of arms of Andrea Contarini

Andrea Contarini was the 60th doge of Venice from 1367 until his death on 5 June 1382. He served as doge during the War of Chioggia, which was fought between the Venetian Republic and the Republic of Genoa.

Contarini was noted for his personal bravery during the war. He also led a fundraising effort in which he personally liquidated his fortune for the country. Though in his seventies, he took personal command of the Venetian Navy (with Admiral Vettor Pisani as his chief of staff) and led troops in the critical Battle of Chioggia.

== Notes ==
Political offices
| Preceded by Marco Cornaro | Doge of Venice; 1367–1382 | Succeeded by Michele Morosini |
