= Vettor Pisani =

Venetian admiral

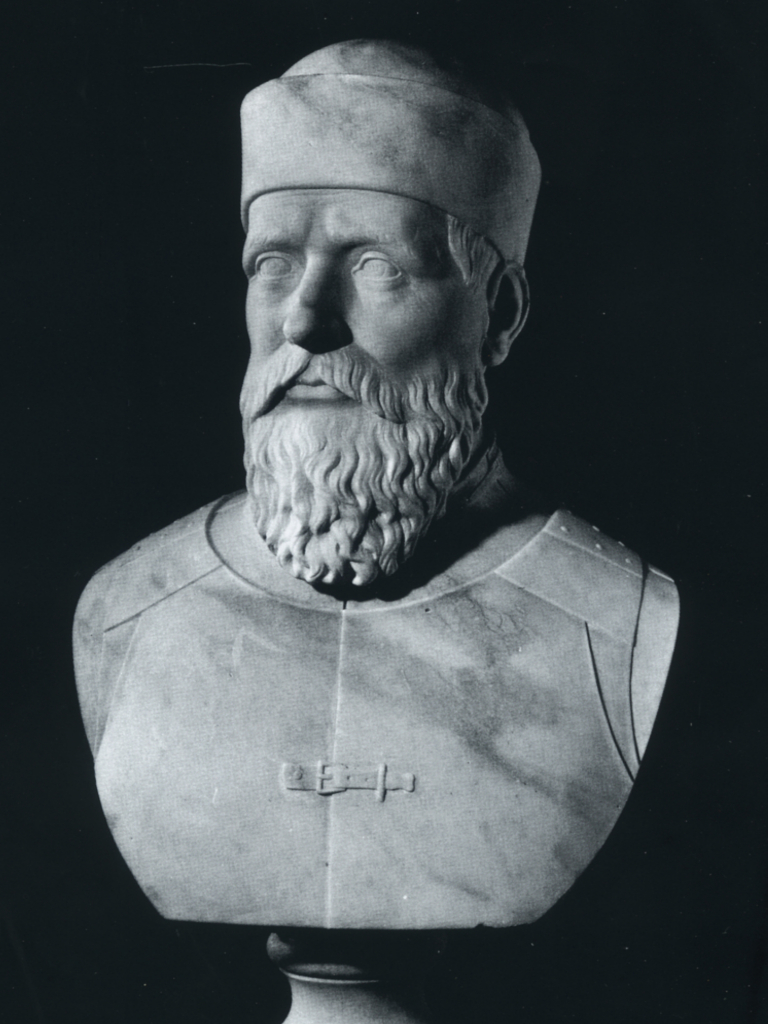
Bust of Pisani at the Palazzo Loredan

Vettor Pisani (1324 – 13 August 1380) was a Venetian admiral.

== Career ==
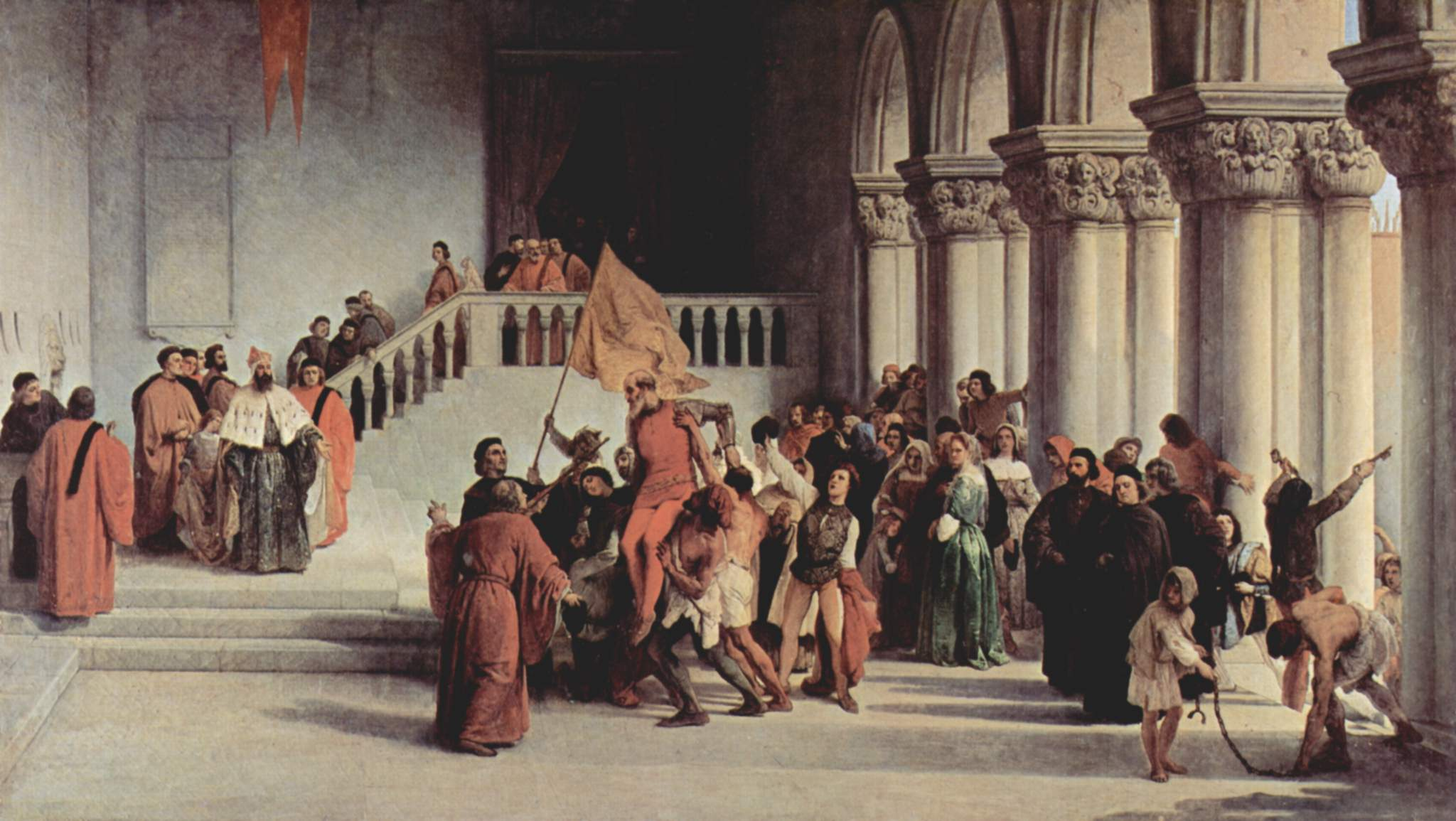
Liberation of Vettor Pisani by Francesco Hayez

He was in command of the Venetian fleet in 1378 during the war against the Genoese, whom he defeated off Capo d'Anzio; subsequently he recaptured Cattaro, Sebenico and Arbe, which had been seized by the Hungarians, the allies of the Genoese. But the Genoese fleet completely defeated Pisani at Pola in May 1379, and on his return to Venice he was thrown into prison.

The Genoese then pressed home their victory, and besieged and captured Chioggia, whereby Venice itself was in danger. The people thereupon demanded the liberation of Pisani, in whose skill they had the fullest confidence.

The government gave way and appointed the aged commander admiral of the fleet once more. Through his able strategy and daring, he recaptured Chioggia, defeated the Genoese and threatened Genoa itself until that republic agreed to peace terms.

Pisani died in 1380 while on his way to Manfredonia with a squadron to ship provisions. He is buried in the Basilica of San Giovanni e Paolo, Venice.

Several ships have borne his name, including Vettor Pisani, an armored cruiser built in the 1890s and the submarine Vettor Pisani, which operated during World War II.

A statue of him is #14 at the Prato della Valle, Padua. His home in Venice is believed to have been in a building which is now part of the Hotel Saturnia.

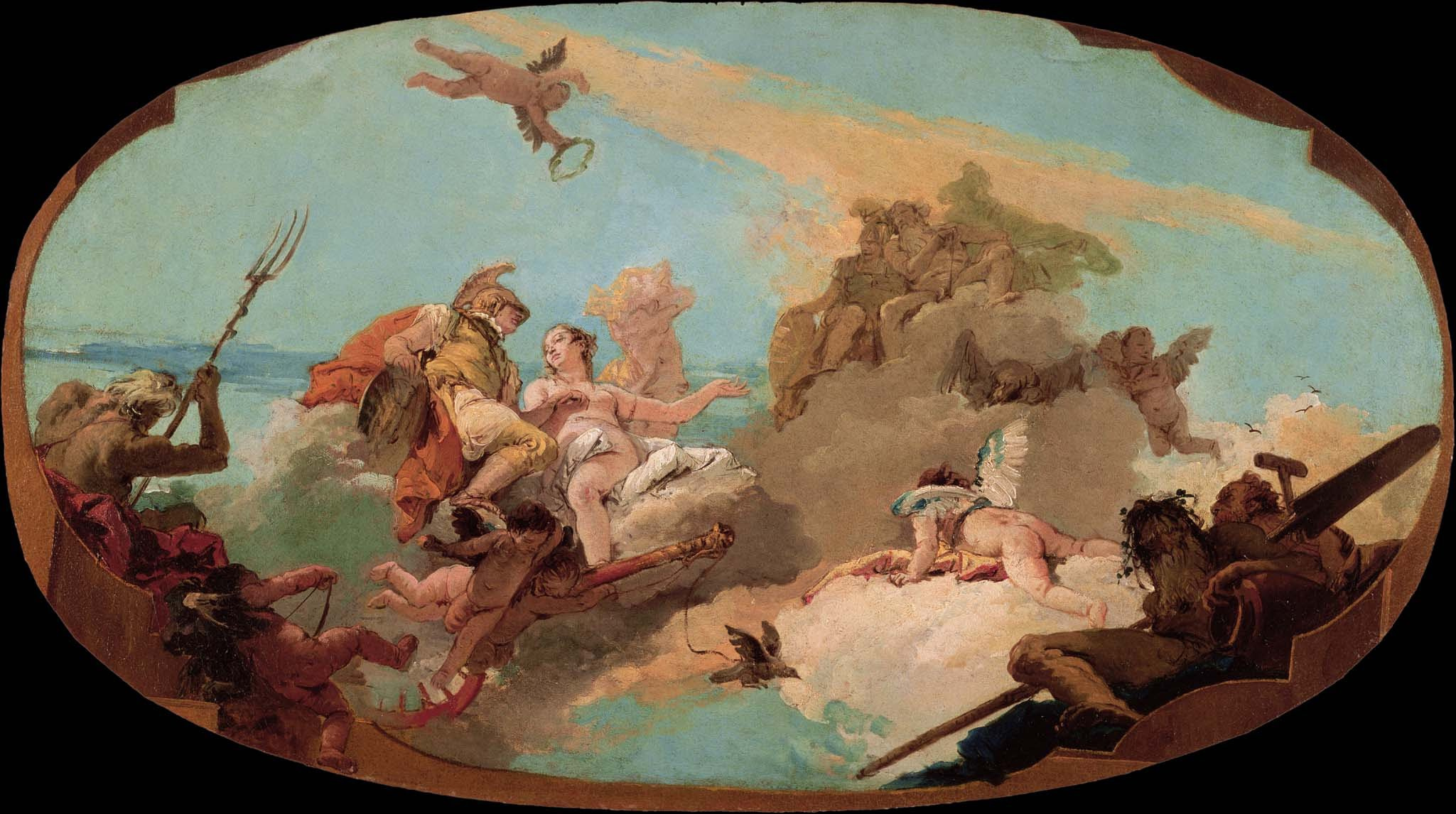
Giovanni Battista Tiepolo, The apotheosis of Admiral Vettor Pisani, c. 1743
