= Antonio Venier =

Doge of Venice from 1382 to 1400

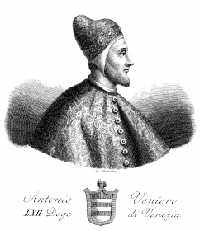

Doge of Venice
- In office 1382–1400
- Preceded by: Michele Morosini
- Succeeded by: Michele Steno

Personal details
- Born: c. 1330
- Died: 23 November 1400

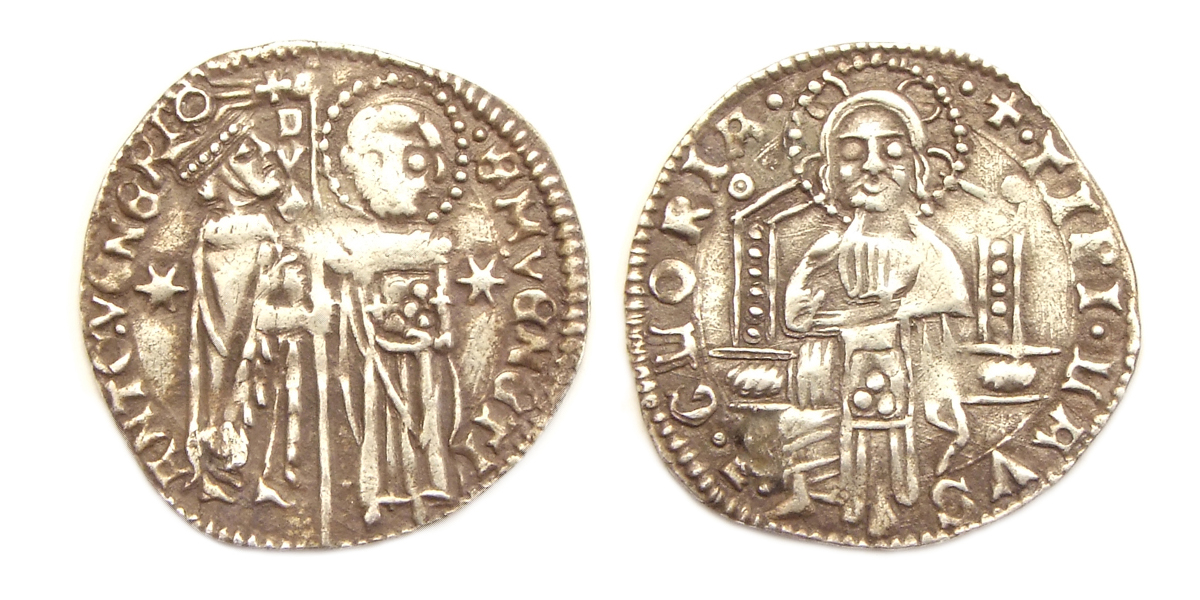
Republic of Venice, Grosso or 'Matapan' of Antonio Venier, Doge of Venice (1382-1400).

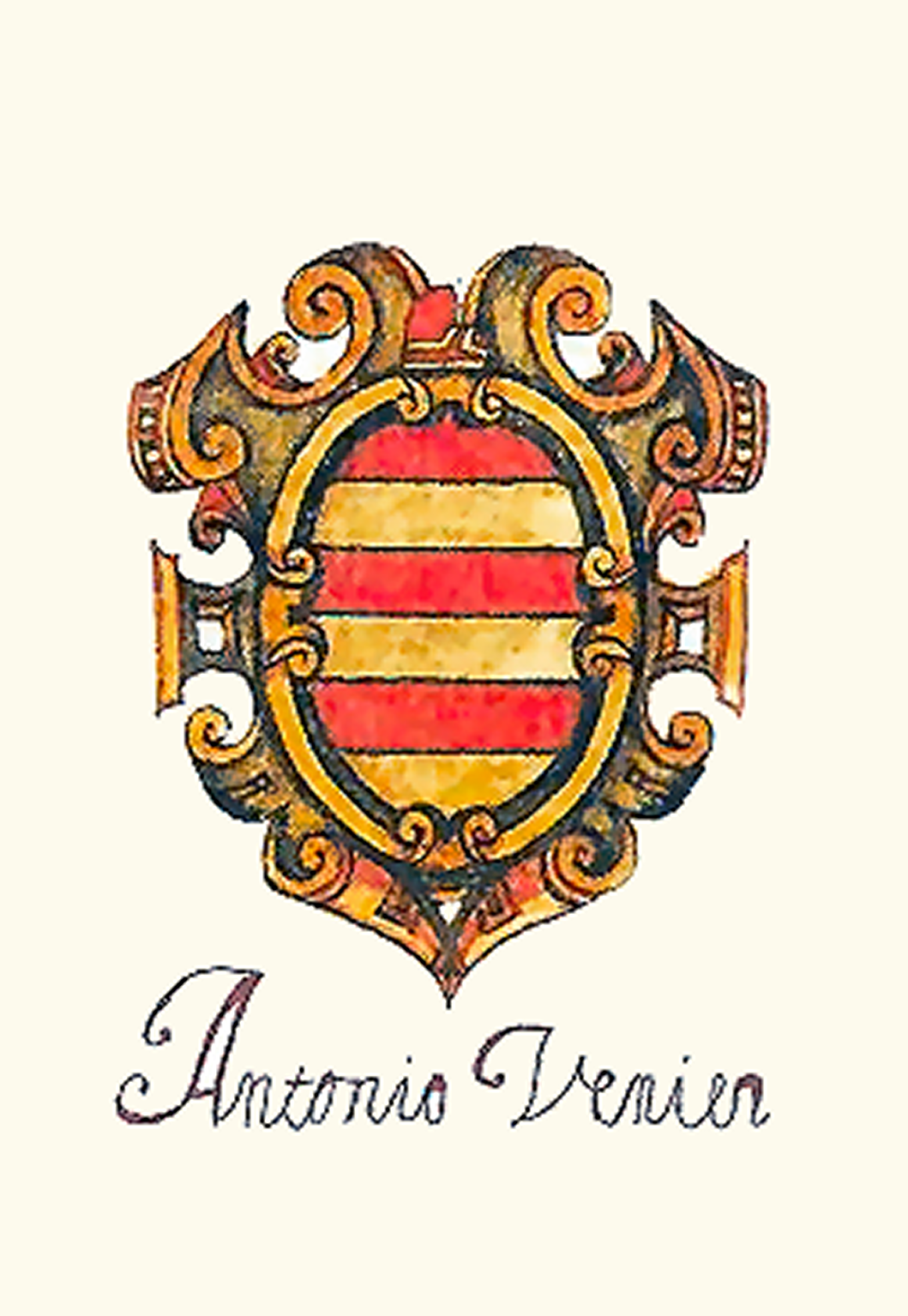
Coat of arms of Antonio Venier

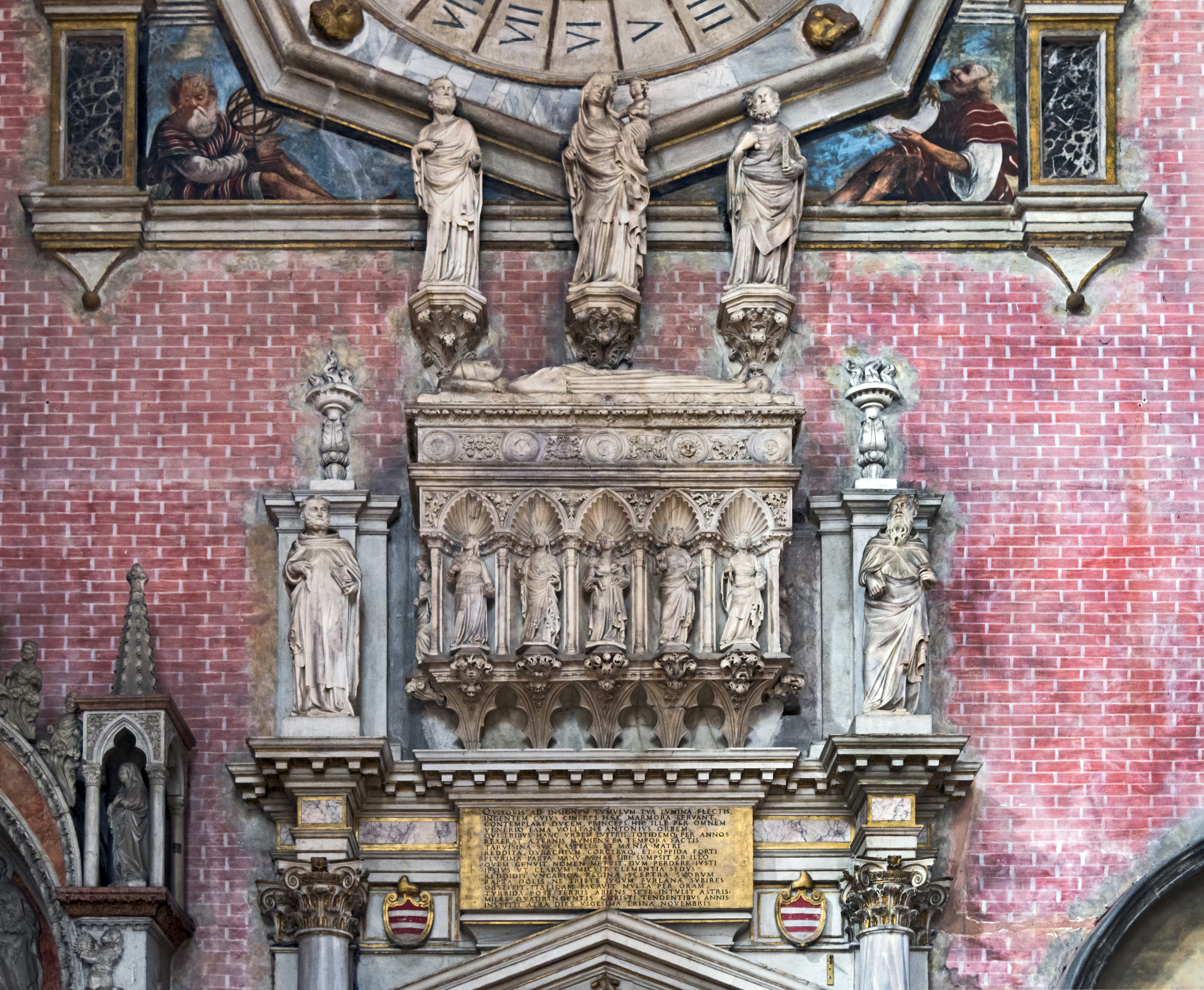
Tomb of Doge Antonio Venier

Antonio Venier (c. 1330 – 23 November 1400) was the 62nd Doge of Venice, member of the House of Venier, reigning from late October 1382 until his death on 23 November 1400. He was interred in the Basilica di San Giovanni e Paolo, a traditional burial place of the doges. He was married to Agnese da Mosto. His 18 year tenure saw great wealth and success for the Republic.

Political offices
Preceded by Michele Morosini	Doge of Venice; 1382–1400	Succeeded by Michele Steno
