= Treaty of Turin (1381) =

1381 treaty ending the War of Chioggia

The Peace of Turin of 1381 ended the War of Chioggia (1376–81), in which Venice, allied with Cyprus and Milan, had narrowly escaped capture by the forces of Genoa, Hungary, Austria, Padua and the Patriarchate of Aquileia. Venice had overcome this crisis, forcing the surrender of the Genoese fleet at Chioggia, fighting a second Genoese fleet to a standstill in the Adriatic, and turning Austria against Padua, thus forcing its most threatening landward opponent into retreat. However, the war had been extremely costly for Venice, and it was only able to secure peace by making major concessions to its opponents.

== Provisions ==
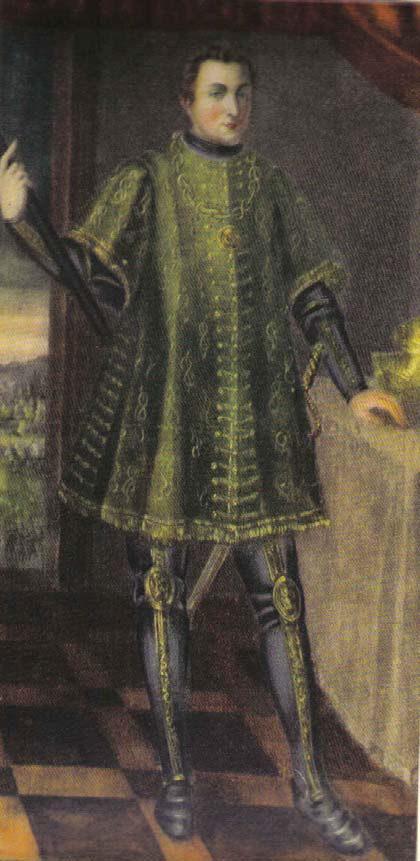
Portrait of Amadeus VI of Savoy

Through the mediation of the "Green Count" Amadeus VI of Savoy, the two sides concluded peace at Turin on 8 August 1381. The Peace of Turin consisted of four separate treaties with Venice's various opponents. The original bone of contention in the war had been the Venetian acquisition of the strategically located island of Tenedos near the Dardanelles, which threatened Genoese access to the Black Sea. Under the treaty between Venice and Genoa, the Venetians were obliged to hand over the island to Amadeus, whose agents would demolish the island's fortifications and evacuate its population, preventing its use as a naval base in future. Venice also agreed to abandon its allies King Peter II of Cyprus and the Byzantine Emperor John V, both still at war with Genoa, and indeed to maintain an embargo against John until he agreed to a stipulated settlement with his son Andronikos IV, Genoa's ally. Venetian merchants were barred for two years from using the port of Tana, their usual trading post on the Black Sea, effectively compelling them to use the Genoese ports of the Crimea instead, to the profit of the Genoese. By the treaty between Venice and Hungary it was agreed that Venice should pay an annual tribute of 7,000 ducats to the crown of Hungary, that the Hungarians on their side should not sail on any river which emptied into the Adriatic between Cape Palmentaria and Rimini, and that Dalmatian merchants should not buy goods in Venice with a value greater than 35,000 ducats. Venice also reiterated its recognition of Hungarian possession of Dalmatia. Venice lost nearly all of its territory on the Italian mainland, surrendering Conegliano and Treviso to Austria. Trieste was to be free, but should pay a yearly tribute to the Doge. With Padua, Venice agreed a mutual restitution of conquests. Milan was not included in the peace.

== Legacy ==
The terms of the peace benefiting Genoa proved enduring. In the 1390s and 1400s, the Ottoman threat led to proposals for the refortification of Tenedos as a base against Turkish shipping around the Dardanelles. However, Genoa refused to agree to its reoccupation by Venice, while Venice rejected all proposals for joint administration by the two cities or for occupation by a third party such as the Papacy, the Byzantine Empire or the Knights of St John. As a result, the island remained vacant until after the entire region had passed under Ottoman control. Genoa was able to continue its Black Sea trade unimpeded, and remained the dominant commercial power there until after the Fall of Constantinople in 1453. The Venetians largely abandoned trade with Cyprus, and the hegemony of the Genoese over the island continued until their defeat and expulsion by the King of Cyprus in 1464.

The agreements with the other powers were less durable. This peace and its aftermath marked a low point in Venice's medieval history, but its neighbours' problems enabled the republic to make a rapid and sustained recovery which led to the progressive overturning of the settlement established at Turin. The lord of Padua acquired Treviso from Austria in 1382, but less than a decade later Venice was able to recover it, as Padua came under heavy attack from Milan. Hungary continued to receive the Venetian tribute until 1397, when in the aftermath of Hungarian defeat in the Crusade of Nicopolis the king transferred his right to receive it to the Duke of Burgundy, who was unable to compel Venice to continue payments; it was formally repudiated in 1424. Dalmatia remained in Hungarian hands until civil war provided the opportunity for Venice to launch a fresh conquest of the region, beginning in 1409.
