= War of Chioggia =

Conflict between Venice and Genoa from 1378 to 1381

- Part of Venetian–Genoese Wars
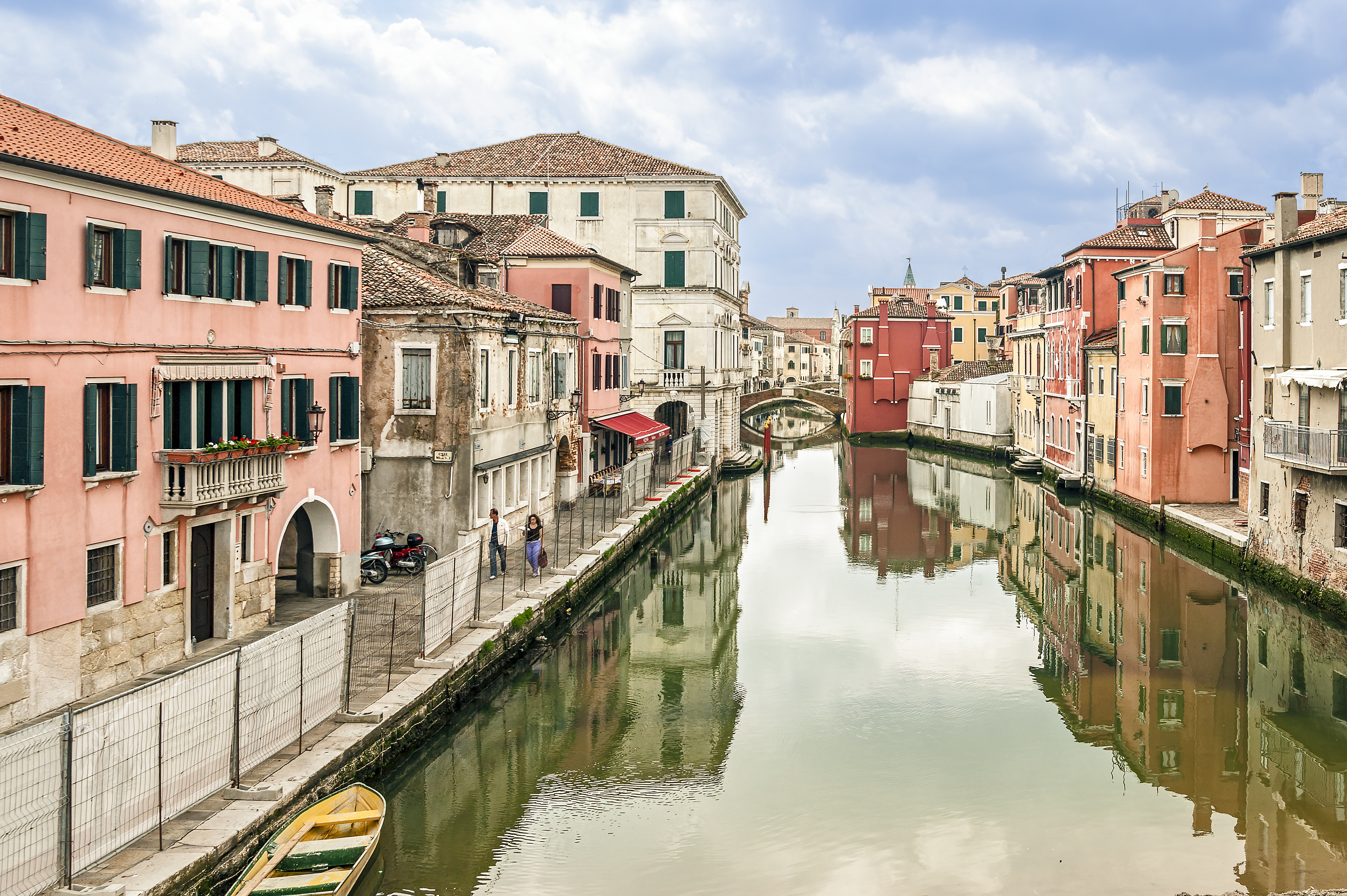
- The town of Chioggia
Date	1378–1381
Location	coasts of Adriatic Sea, Mediterranean Sea, Tyrrhenian Sea, Cyprus
Result	Inconclusive, both republics came out of it exhausted, Hungary conquers Dalmatia, Venice forced to pay annual tribute to King of Hungary; Treaty of Turin

Belligerents
Republic of Venice; Supported by: Lordship of Milan under Bernabò Visconti	Republic of Genoa; Supported by: Padua; Kingdom of Hungary; Patriarchate of Aquileia; Duchy of Austria

Commanders and leaders
Andrea Contarini; Vettor Pisani; Carlo Zeno	Luigi de' Fieschi; Matteo Maruffo; Luciano Doria †; Pietro Doria †

The War of Chioggia (Italian: Guerra di Chioggia) was a conflict fought by the Republic of Genoa against the Republic of Venice between 1378 and 1381, the conclusion of an open confrontation that had lasted for years and which had already included some occasional and limited military clashes.

Initially the Genoese managed to conquer Chioggia and vast areas of the Venetian Lagoon, but in the end the Venetians managed to recover Chioggia and the Lagoon and Istrian cities that had fallen into the hands of the Genoese. The war then ended diplomatically with the Treaty of Turin on 8 August 1381, which sanctioned the exit of the Genoese and Venetians from a conflict in which both maritime republics had suffered enormous economic damage.

The War of Chioggia represented the last major clash between the Genoese and the Venetians, from which Venice soon recovered thanks to its solid internal organisation, while Genoa, at that time also tormented by internal struggles for power, entered a period of clashes which led it to a coexistence with its Venetian rivals, and their commercial interests towards the Aegean and the Eastern Mediterranean were de facto divided in the following centuries, with the areas of the Dodecanese, Constantinople and the Black Sea to Genoese trade, while the Adriatic, the Ionian Islands and Crete to Venetian trade.

The events of this war - which led to the complete destruction of Clodia minor, the current Sottomarina - are still recalled in the Palio della Marciliana, which is held annually in Chioggia.

== Background ==
The two maritime powers, Genoa and Venice, had long been leading commercial powers with ties to Constantinople that had nurtured their growth during the Early Middle Ages. Their rivalry over trade with the Levant and other areas of the eastern Mediterranean had generated a number of wars. Genoa, having suffered previous defeats at the hands of the Venetians, had emerged from submission to the Visconti tyrants of Milan during the 14th century, although it had also been severely weakened by the outbreak of the Black Death in 1348, which killed more than 40,000 people in Genoa. Venice had participated in the dismemberment of the Byzantine Empire in 1204 and gradually taken over land on the Adriatic coast, thereby entering into conflict with the Kingdom of Hungary; on the Italian mainland, its terrestrial acquisitions had generated a rivalry with the largest nearby city, Padua.

Genoa wanted to establish a complete monopoly in the Black Sea area, particularly in the trade of grain, timber, fur, and slaves. In order to do so it needed to eliminate the commercial threat posed by Venice in this region. Genoa felt compelled to initiate the conflict because of the collapse of Mongol hegemony over the Central Asian Trade Route which had hitherto been a significant source of wealth for Genoa. When the Mongols lost control of the area, trade became much more hazardous and far less profitable. Hence Genoa's decision to go to war was to ensure its trade in the Black Sea area remained under its control.

== Allies ==
Genoa's allies included Hungary and Padua. The King of Hungary, Louis I, had conquered Dalmatia from Venice and by 1379 Hungarian forces threatened Venice itself by land from the north. Paduan forces, under the leadership of Francesco I da Carrara, cut off Venice's communications to the west. Genoa's allies also included the Patriarch of Aquileia and Leopold III, the Duke of Austria.

The danger on land seemed trifling to Venice so long as she could keep the sea open to her trade and press the war against the Genoese in the Levant. Venice's allies, which included Bernabò Visconti of Milan, gave her little help on this side, although his mercenaries invaded the territory of Genoa. The Milanese troops were defeated in September 1379 in the Val Bisagno. Bernabò, whose despotism and taxes had enraged the Milanese, was deposed by his nephew Gian Galeazzo Visconti in 1385. Imprisoned in the castle of Trezzo, Bernabò was poisoned in December of that year.

Venice had the support of the Byzantine Emperor John V Palaiologos. In 1376, the Genoese helped Andronikos IV overthrow John V, but in 1379 Venice restored the latter to the throne.

== Tenedos ==
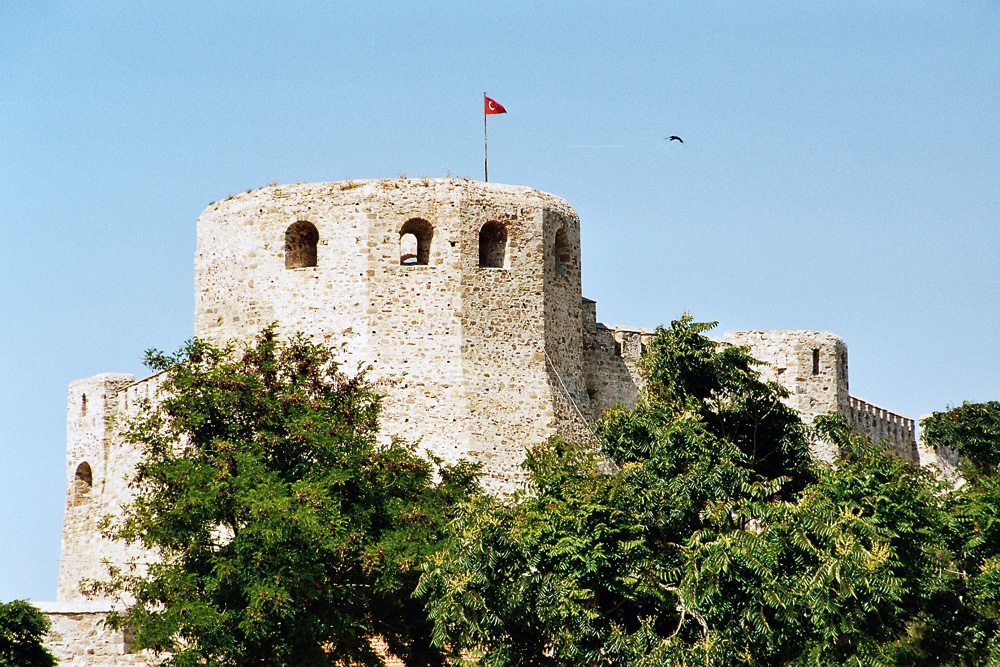
Part of the Venetian fortress on Tenedos (Bozcaada)

The war was primarily fought over control of the island of Tenedos in the Aegean Sea, and both sides supported different claimants to the throne of the Byzantine Empire. Tenedos had been acquired by Venice from the Byzantine Empire in 1377, but after this conflict, they ceded it to Savoy and evacuated it in 1381. The Pope decided that the castle on Tenedos should be demolished, rather than be a source of contention between the two cities; 4000 Greek islanders from Tenedos were resettled in Crete and Euboea.

== Cape d'Anzio (30 May 1378) ==
During the first stage of the war the plans of the senate were carried out with general success. While Carlo Zeno harassed the Genoese stations in the Levant, Vettor Pisani brought one of their squadrons to action on 30 May 1378 off Cape d'Anzio to the south of the Tiber, and defeated it. The battle was fought in a gale by 10 Venetian against 11 Genoese galleys. The Genoese admiral, Luigi de' Fieschi, was taken with 5 of his galleys, and others were wrecked. Four of the squadron escaped, and steered for Famagusta in Cyprus, then held by Genoa. If Pisani had directed his course to Genoa itself, which was thrown into a panic by the defeat at Anzio, it is possible that he might have dictated peace, but he thought his squadron too weak, and preferred to follow the Genoese galleys which had fled to Famagusta.

== Traù (1378) ==
Pisani returned to the Adriatic and with a fleet of 25 galleys destroyed the port of Sebenico (today's Šibenik, Croatia) and headed towards Traù (Trogir), where 22 Genoese galleys were found, commanded by Luciano Doria. Pisani attacked Traù, but the port, heavily fortified, resisted his attack. The Venetians, suffering damage themselves, withdrew to Venice.

== Battle of Pola (7 May 1379) ==
The next spring (1379) the Venetians attempted to attack Traù again, but were repelled. During the summer of 1379 Pisani was employed partly in attacking Genoa in Cyprus, but mainly in taking possession of the Istrian and Dalmatian towns which supported the Hungarians from fear of the aggressive ambition of Venice. He was ordered to winter on the coast of Istria, where his crews suffered from exposure and disease. Genoa, having recovered from the panic caused by the disaster at Anzio, decided to attack Venice at home while the best of her ships were absent with Carlo Zeno. The Ligurian republic sent a strong fleet into the Adriatic under Luciano Doria.

Pisani had been reinforced early in the spring of 1379, but when he was sighted by the Genoese fleet of 25 sail off Pola in Istria on the May 7, he was slightly outnumbered, and his crews were still weak. The Venetian admiral would have preferred to avoid battle, and to check an attack on Venice itself, by threatening the Genoese fleet from his base on the Istrian coast. He was forced into battle by the commissioner (proveditore) Michele Steno, who as agent of the senate had authority over the admiral. The Venetians were defeated with the loss of all their galleys except six. Luciano Doria fell in the battle, and the Genoese, who had suffered severely, did not at once follow up their success.

When Pisani returned home, he was thrown into prison. However, he was later released when the city of Venice was threatened by the Genoese at the Battle of Chioggia.

== Lido and Brondolo (July 1379) ==
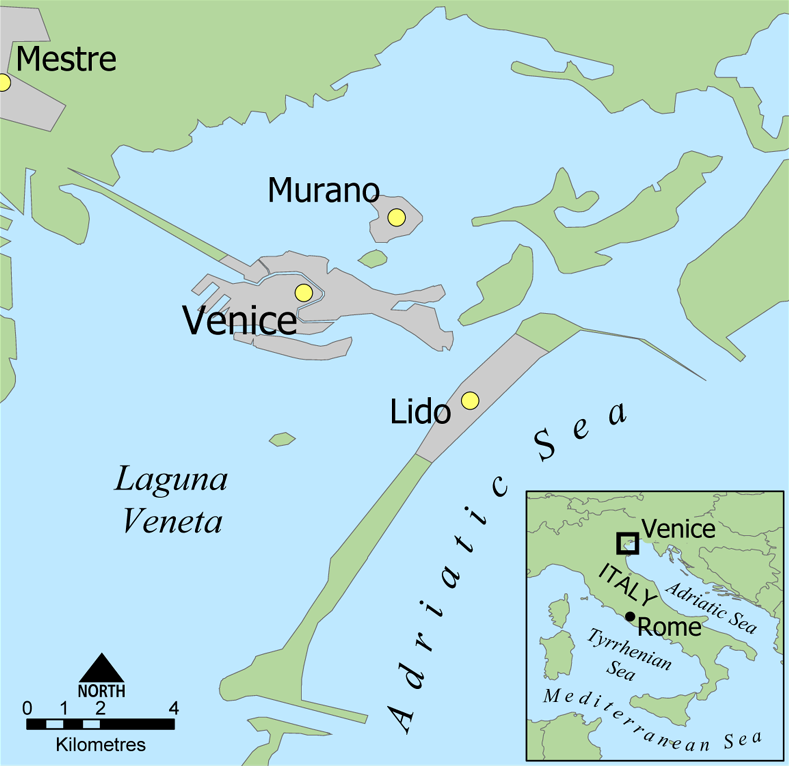
Lido and Venice.

On the arrival of Pietro Doria, with reinforcements, the Genoese appeared off the Lido, the outer barrier of the lagoon of Venice, in July, and in August they entered on a combined naval and military attack on the city, in combination with the Paduans under the Carraresi and the Hungarians.

The Venetians had closed the passages through the outer banks except at the southern end, at the island of Brondolo, and the town of Chioggia. The barrier here approaches close to the mainland, and the position facilitated the co-operation of the Genoese with the Paduans and Hungarians, but Chioggia is distant from Venice, which could only be reached along the canals across the lagoon. The Venetians had taken up the buoys which marked the fairway, and had placed a light squadron on the lagoon. The allies soon occupied Brondolo.

== Battle of Chioggia (August 1379–June 1380) ==
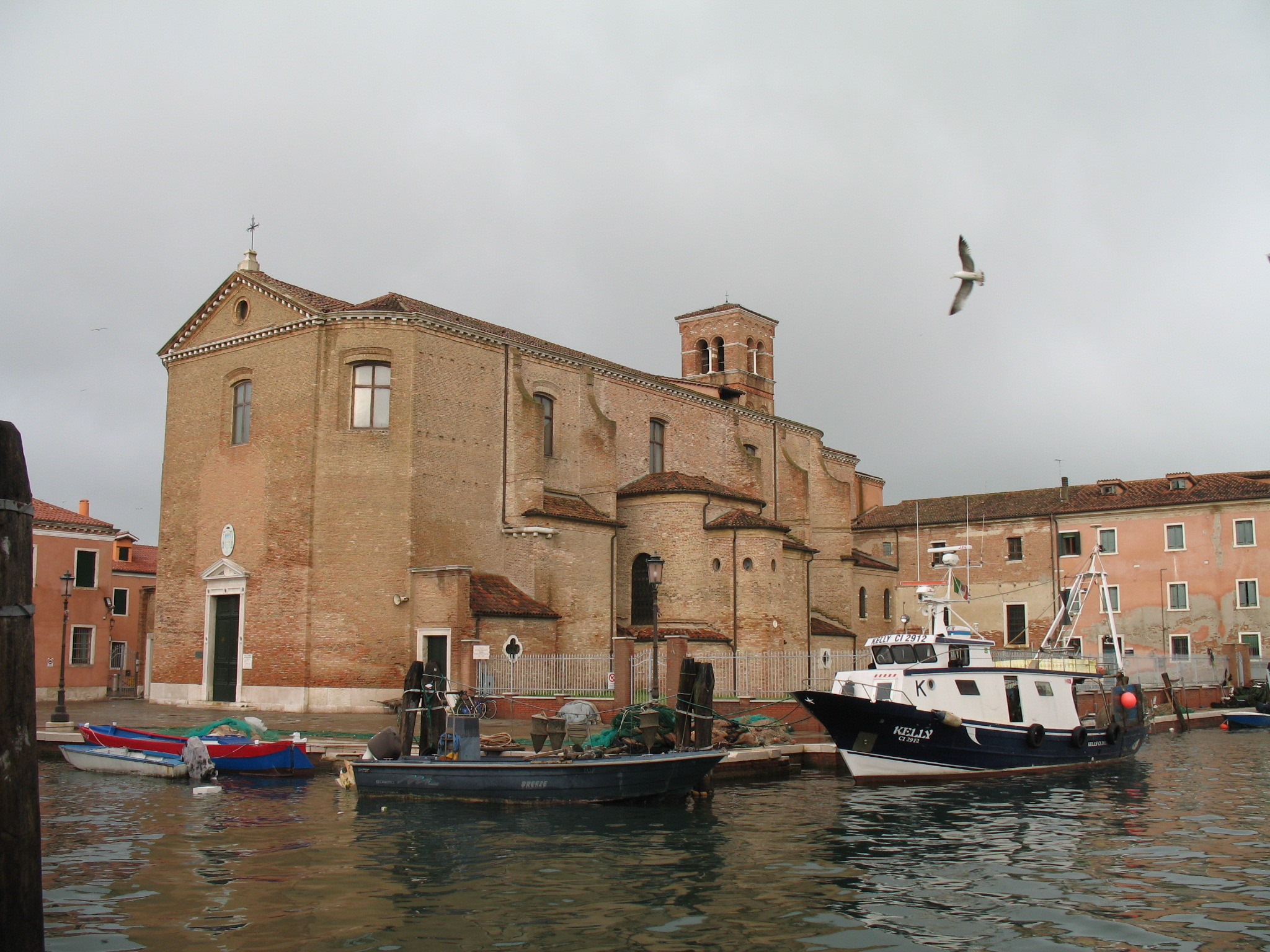
The town of Chioggia

This wider conflict takes its name from the fishing port town of Chioggia, which had a Venetian garrison of 3,000 men. The Genoese were reinforced by the Hungarians and Paduans, and suddenly and unexpectedly they attacked the south end of the lagoon, brought her fleet into the channels of the lagoon and, with her allies, stormed and captured Chioggia on 16 August 1379. By mid-August 1379 the allies had Venice encircled.

The Venetian senate applied for peace, but when the Genoese replied that they were resolved to "bit and bridle the Horses of Saint Mark" the Venetians decided to fight to the end. All Venetian reserves were mobilized and Vittor Pisani, imprisoned after the battle of Pola, was released by popular demand.

During the night of 22 December 1379, under cover of darkness, the doge of Venice Andrea Contarini and Pisani blockaded Chioggia. They thus cut off the occupying forces from both the Paduans and the Genoese fleet. After launching this diversionary attack on Chioggia, the Venetians managed to sink obstructions closing every channel by which the Genoese fleet might escape from the cul-de-sac at Chioggia.

The Venetian galley fleet that had been on a raiding expedition in the Mediterranean reached the anchorage off Brondolo on 1 January 1380; this fleet was under the command of Carlo Zeno, who had left on a plundering expedition before the battle of Pola and had been inflicting damage on Genoese trade in the Tyrrhenian and Aegean seas as far as Beirut and Rhodes. Zeno returned home in time to join the blockade of Chioggia. It was the Genoese who now were encircled.

The attack on Genoese-held Chioggia was now pressed with vigour. The Genoese held out resolutely in the hope of relief from home. Months of skirmishes followed. The Genoese attempted to clear the barricades in the channels and the Venetians to defend them. Genoese also failed in an attempt to subdue the mercenaries employed by the Venetians who were besieging them. The heavy Genoese vessels were much hampered by the shallow water and intricate passages through the lagoon. By taking advantage of their embarrassment and his own local knowledge, Pisani carried out a series of movements which entirely turned the tables on the invaders. Pisani executed a succession of night attacks, during which he sank vessels laden with stones not only in the canals leading through the lagoon to Venice, but in the fairways leading from Chioggia to the open sea round both ends of the island of Brondolo. The Genoese were thus shut in at the very moment when they thought they were about to besiege Venice. Pisani stationed the galleys under his command in the open sea outside Brondolo, and during the rest of the year blockaded the enemy closely. The distress of the Venetians themselves was great, but the Doge Andrea Contarini and the nobles set an example by sharing the general hardships, and taking an oath not to return to Venice till they had recovered Chioggia.

But the resources of Genoa had been taxed to fit out the squadrons she had already sent to sea. It was not until 12 May 1380 that her admiral, Matteo Maruffo, was able to reach the neighbourhood of Brondolo with a relieving force. By this time the Venetians had recovered the island, and their fleet occupied a fortified anchorage from which they refused to be drawn. Maruffo could do nothing, and on 24 June 1380 the defenders of Chioggia surrendered.

The naval Battle of Chioggia took place on 24 June 1380 in the lagoon off Chioggia, resulting in a victory for Venice. The Genoese, near starvation, surrendered and thus allowed the Venetians to regain control of the Adriatic.

== Peace of Turin (1381) ==
Through the mediation of the "Green Count" of Savoy, Amadeus VI, the two sides made a peace treaty at Turin. It gave no formal advantage to Genoa or Venice. But it spelled the end of their long competition: Genoese shipping was not seen in the Adriatic after Chioggia.

This conflict saw the first use of shipborne cannons in support of amphibious assault operations and perhaps against Genoese galleys.

The conflict was nearly disastrous for both sides, and Genoa was certainly crippled. Genoa lost the naval ascendency that the city-state had enjoyed prior to the war. Venice might have suffered as badly, were it not for its admirals Vettor Pisani and Carlo Zeno. She regained her strength and continued to impressive maturity until her defeat by the League of Cambrai in 1508.
