= Battle of Settepozzi =

1263 battle off the island of Spetses

- Part of the War of Saint Sabas
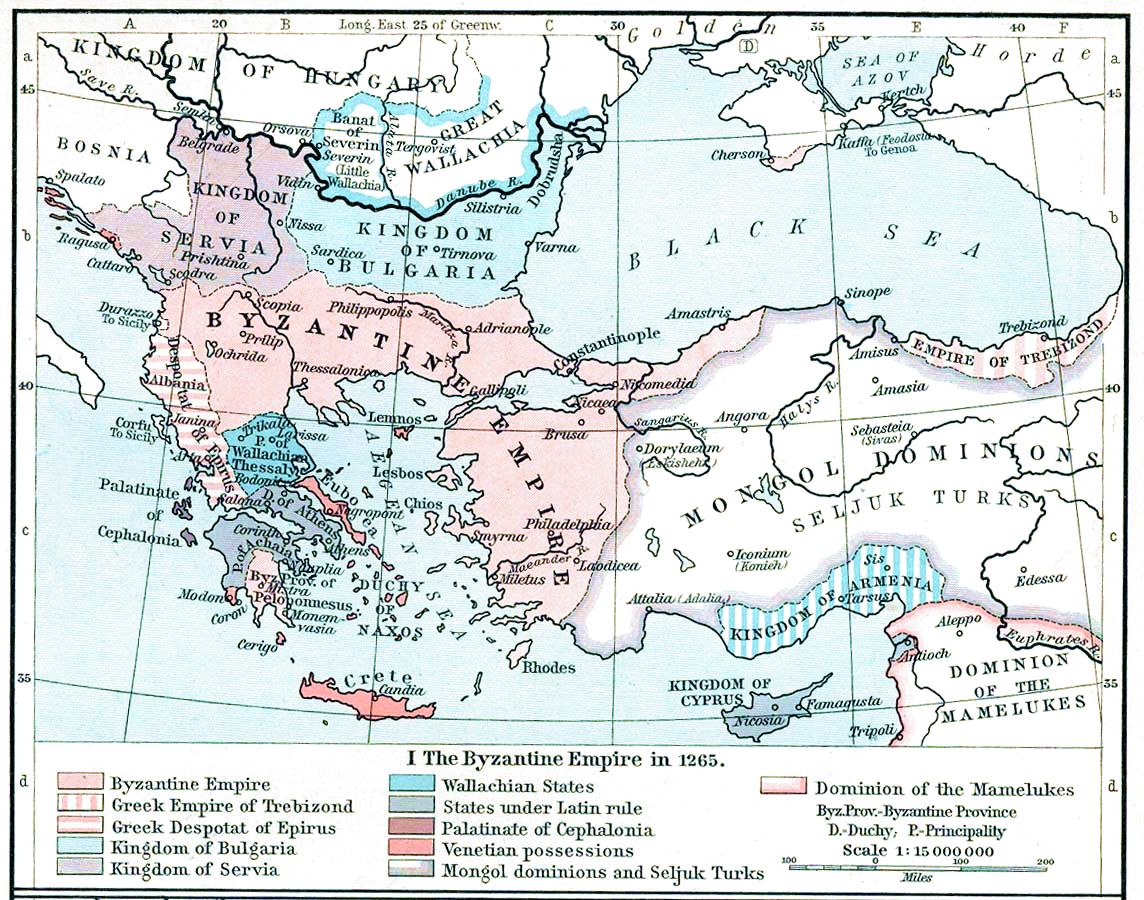
- Map of the restored Byzantine Empire of Michael VIII Palaiologos and the surrounding states in 1265
Date	First half of 1263
Location	Off Spetses, Argolic Gulf, Greece 37°15′N 23°06′E
Result	Venetian victory

Belligerents
Republic of Venice	Republic of Genoa; Byzantine Empire

Commanders and leaders
Guiberto Dandolo	Pietro Avvocato †; Lanfranco Spinola; 2 unnamed admirals

Strength
32 galleys	38 galleys 10 saette (Note: A saetta was a type of smaller and narrower galley, with only one oarsman per bench rather than two or three, optimized for speed rather than carrying capacity.) (only 14 engaged)

Casualties and losses
20 killed 400 wounded	600 killed or wounded 400 captured 4 galleys captured
- Location within present-day Greece

The Battle of Settepozzi was fought in the first half of 1263 off the Greek island of Settepozzi (the medieval Italian name for Spetses) between a Genoese–Byzantine fleet and a smaller Venetian fleet.

Genoa and the Byzantines had been allied against Venice since the Treaty of Nymphaeum in 1261, while Genoa, in particular, had been engaged in the War of Saint Sabas against Venice from 1256. In 1263, a Genoese fleet of 48 ships, which was sailing to the Byzantine stronghold of Monemvasia, encountered a Venetian fleet of 32 ships. The Genoese decided to attack, but only two of the four admirals of the Genoese fleet and 14 of its ships took part in the engagement, and were easily routed by the Venetians, who captured four vessels and inflicted considerable casualties.

The Venetian victory and the demonstration of Genoese reluctance to confront them in battle had considerable political repercussions, as the Byzantines began to distance themselves from their alliance with Genoa and restored their relations with Venice, concluding a five-year non-aggression pact in 1268. After Settepozzi, the Genoese avoided confrontation with the Venetian navy, instead focusing on commerce raiding. This did not prevent another, even more lopsided and complete defeat at the Battle of Trapani in 1266.

== Background ==
When Michael VIII Palaiologos (r. 1259–1282) became ruler of the Byzantine Greek Empire of Nicaea, he set about realizing the Nicaean ambition to recover Constantinople, the former capital of the Byzantine Empire, which since the Fourth Crusade in 1204 had been the seat of the rival Latin Empire. By this time, the Latin Empire was a weak remnant of its former self, but was backed by the naval might of the Republic of Venice, which contributed to the failure of two large-scale Nicaean attempts to capture the city in 1235 and 1260. The latter failure especially made the need to counter the Venetian fleet apparent to Palaiologos. Only one state possessed that capability: the Republic of Genoa.

Venice's main commercial rival, Genoa had been embroiled since 1256 in the War of Saint Sabas against Venice, and after a reversal suffered in the conflict, the city was faced with the prospect of being cut off entirely from the lucrative Levantine trade. Seeking a way out, as well as a diplomatic coup that would bolster his own internal position against the Genoese nobility, the autocratic Captain of the People, Guglielmo Boccanegra, dispatched an embassy to Palaiologos offering an alliance. The resulting Treaty of Nymphaeum, signed on 13 March 1261, obliged Genoa to furnish a fleet of 50 vessels, with their expenses paid by the Emperor, but in exchange secured very advantageous commercial terms; following a successful recovery of Constantinople, the Genoese stood to effectively inherit and even expand upon the privileged position that the Venetians held in the Latin Empire.

In the event, Constantinople was recovered by the Nicaean general Alexios Strategopoulos barely a fortnight after the treaty was signed, without the need for Genoese naval assistance. Nevertheless, Michael VIII scrupulously observed the terms of the Treaty of Nymphaeum, as Genoese naval strength was still necessary to confront a potential Venetian counterstrike while a native Byzantine fleet was slowly being re-established. With the Emperor's subsidies, the Genoese were able to increase their fleet strength considerably. For a year after the recapture of Constantinople, both Venice and Genoa remained passive in the Aegean Sea: Venice hesitated to confront the numerically far superior fleet that Genoa had dispatched to the area, and awaited political developments in Italy, while Genoa suffered from internal turmoil with the overthrow of Boccanegra and the assumption of power by a collective leadership representing the noble houses of the city.

In the summer of 1262, the Venetians ordered a 37-galley fleet under Jacopo Dolfin into the Aegean, which met the Genoese fleet of 60 ships under Ottone Vento at Thessalonica. The Genoese refused to engage, but were also able to obstruct Venetian attempts to blockade them in port. A piratical foray by the Lombard lords of Negroponte, who were allied with Venice, into the Marmara Sea was confronted and defeated by a Byzantine–Genoese squadron. Meanwhile, hostilities broke out in the Morea (the Peloponnese peninsula), where Michael VIII dispatched an expeditionary force (in late 1262 or early 1263) against the Principality of Achaea. Despite initial successes, Byzantine attempts to conquer the entirety of the principality were decisively thwarted at Prinitza and Makryplagi.

== Battle ==
Some time in early 1263, a Genoese fleet of 38 galleys and 10 saette, crewed by some 6,000 men and commanded by four admirals, was sailing to the Byzantine fortress and naval base of Monemvasia in the south-eastern Morea. At the island of Settepozzi (Spetses) it encountered a Venetian fleet of 32 galleys, under Guiberto Dandolo, sailing north to Negroponte.

The details of the engagement are not very clear. According to the Genoese Annales Ianuenses, when the signal to attack was given, only fourteen Genoese ships under two of the admirals, Pietro Avvocato and Lanfranco Spinola, advanced, while the rest stood back and then suddenly fled. The Venetian chronicler Martino da Canal, however, records that the Venetian ships attacked first, while the Genoese were deployed in four ranks of ten ships each. According to Canal, the Venetians boarded two of the Genoese flagships and, once they captured them and cut down their flags, the other two admirals turned and fled. The battle ended in a clear Venetian victory: the Genoese fleet lost many men, including Avvocato, and the Venetians captured four Genoese ships, including the flagships of the two admirals. Canal put Genoese casualties—"exaggeratedly perhaps", according to the historian Deno Geanakoplos—at 1,000 men (600 killed or wounded and 400 captured), as compared to 20 killed and 400 wounded on the Venetian side.

According to the Annales Ianuenses, the hesitation of the Genoese fleet to engage may have been due to the fact that the Venetians claimed immunity as crusaders. On the other hand, the Genoese navy generally failed to effectively confront its Venetian counterpart throughout the war; often, according to naval historian John Dotson, "because of divided or ineffective command", which was also in evidence at Settepozzi. The historians Frederic Lane and Deno Geanakoplos explain the Genoese commanders' reluctance to risk their ships by pointing out that these were owned by private contractors, usually the rich noble merchants who ran the city, and thus constituted valuable assets for which the admirals were answerable.

== Questions of chronology and details ==
The 14th-century Venetian historian Andrea Dandolo placed the battle at the end of the tenth year of Doge Reniero Zeno's reign, i.e., either in late 1262 or January 1263, whereas the Annales Ianuenses simply record it under the year 1263. Modern historians generally place the battle in the spring of 1263: the medievalist Georg Caro placed it in March at the latest, whereas the naval historian Camillo Manfroni suggested May as the most likely time. Geanakoplos, largely following Manfroni, placed the battle in the period May–July 1263.

The Annales Ianuenses mention the battle directly after the sailing, on 28 May 1263, of a fleet of 25 galleys and six other ships to reinforce their fleet operating in the Aegean, under the admirals Pietrino Grimaldi and Pesceto Mallone, implying that they were involved in the battle. However, the Byzantinist Albert Failler considers that this fleet probably sailed before news of Settepozzi had arrived in Genoa, and that it did not engage in any combat, while the medievalist Michel Balard suggests that the fleet defeated at Settepozzi may have been sailing to Monemvasia to unite with the new fleet coming from Genoa. While the fleet sailed for Monemvasia "on the emperor's orders" according to the Annales, its direct connection with the Byzantine operations in the Morea, such as the arrival of Byzantine troops at Monemvasia mentioned in a letter of Pope Urban IV, is uncertain.

In addition, the exact identity of the two admirals who were not engaged in battle is unknown. Canal reports that one of them was a Greek, and the presence of Byzantine ships in the Genoese fleets is mentioned in the sources. However, the only Byzantine fleet commander attested by name during this time, Alexios Doukas Philanthropenos, was active in the Aegean islands, rather than along the coasts of the Greek mainland.

== Repercussions ==
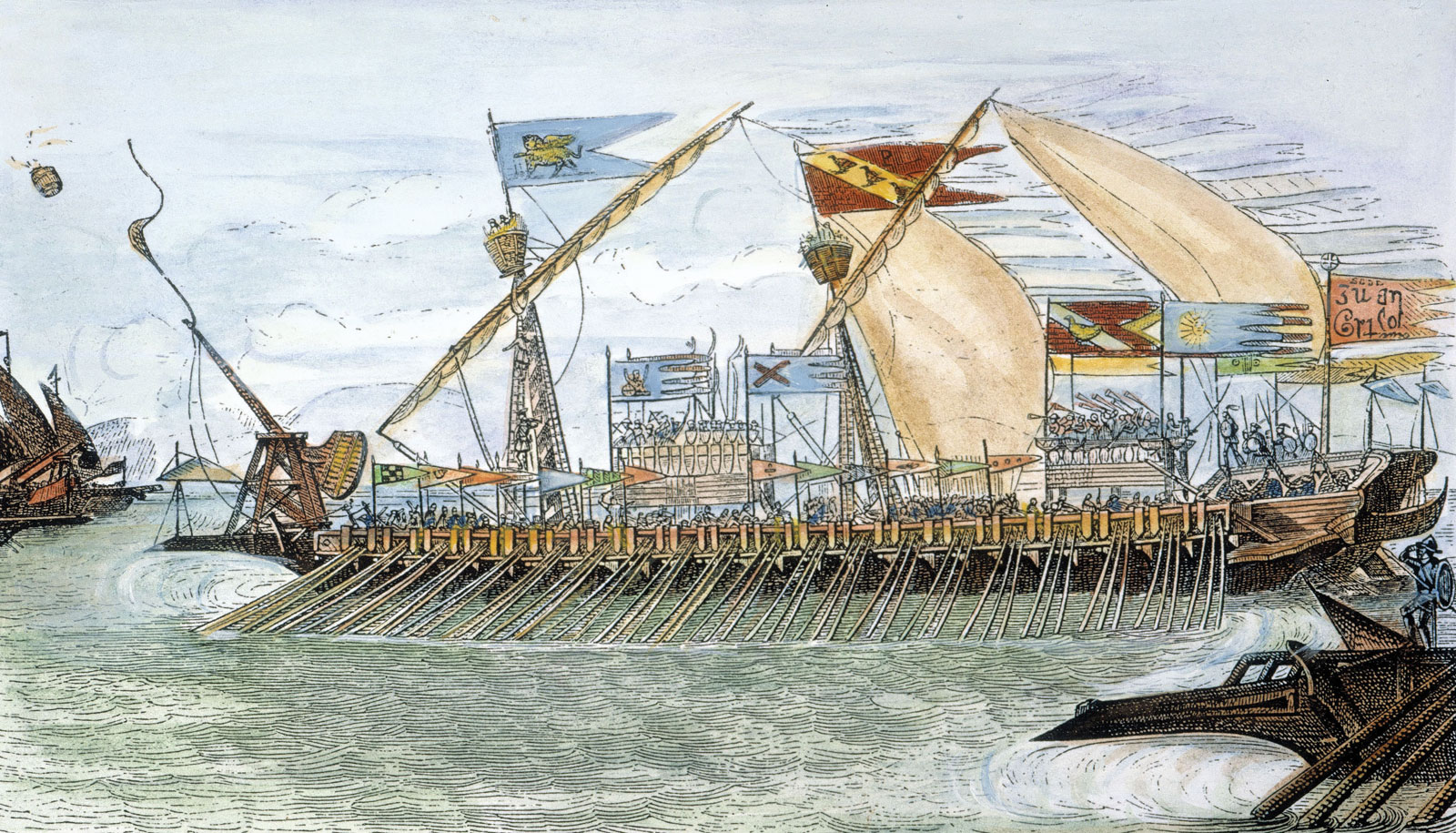
A 13th-century Venetian galley (19th-century depiction)

Although most of the Genoese fleet survived the battle, and in its aftermath managed to capture four Venetian taride cargo vessels full of provisions sailing for Negroponte, the Genoese established a court of inquiry on the battle, and condemned the surviving admirals, councillors, and pilots "for their excesses ... and malfeasance in the areas of Romania [i.e., the Byzantine East]". No further details are given in the Annales but, as Geanakoplos remarks, "it is nevertheless a significant indication of guilt that such terms could be used by the more or less official chronicle of the [Republic of Genoa]".

Subsequently, the Genoese avoided direct confrontations with the Venetian battle fleet and engaged in commerce raiding against the Venetian merchant convoys, achieving a notable success in 1264 at the Battle of Saseno. In 1266 the main Genoese fleet of 27 galleys was defeated and captured in its entirety by the Venetians at the Battle of Trapani. The war between the two powers lasted until 1270, when King Louis IX of France coerced both to sign the Treaty of Cremona.

Apart from the loss in lives and ships, the long-term ramifications of the defeat at Settepozzi were political: Michael VIII began to reconsider the alliance with Genoa, which was very costly but had so far brought little in return. The Emperor had shown signs of impatience with his allies before, but now he made his frustration public: soon after the battle Michael VIII dismissed sixty Genoese ships from his service and, according to Canal, severely dressed down the Genoese podestà in Constantinople. Genoese ships were soon allowed to return to Imperial service, but Michael VIII began to delay the payments for their crews. The Byzantine–Genoese rift culminated in 1264, when the Genoese podestà was implicated in a plot to surrender Constantinople to Manfred of Sicily, whereupon the Emperor expelled the Genoese from the city.

Michael VIII signed a treaty with the Venetians on 18 June 1265, but it was not ratified by Doge Zeno. In the face of the threat from Charles of Anjou after 1266, Michael VIII was forced to renew his alliance with Genoa, but also maintained his détente with Venice, signing a five-year non-aggression pact in June 1268.

== Sources ==
- Balard, Michel (1978). La Romanie génoise (XIIe – Début du XVe siècle) [Genoese Romania (12th – early 15th century)] (in French). Vol. 1. Rome: École Française de Rome. OCLC 300152785.
- Caro, Georg (1895). Genua und die Mächte am Mittelmeer 1257–1311. Ein Beitrag zur Geschichte des XIII. Jahrhunderts. Erster Band [Genoa and the Powers of the Mediterranean 1257–1311. Contribution to the History of the 13th Century. First Volume.] (in German). Halle a. S.: Max Niemeyer. OCLC 457285419.
- Dotson, John E. (1999). "Fleet Operations in the First Genoese–Venetian War, 1264–1266". Viator. Medieval and Renaissance Studies. 30: 165–180. doi:10.1484/J.VIATOR.2.300833. ISSN 0083-5897.
- Dotson, John E. (2002). "Venice, Genoa and Control of the Seas in the Thirteenth and Fourteenth Centuries". In Hattenforf, John B.; Unger, Richard W. (eds.). War at Sea in the Middle Ages and the Renaissance. Woodbridge, Suffolk: Boydell & Brewer. pp. 119–136. ISBN 0-85115-903-6.
- Dotson, John E. (2006). "Ship Types and Fleet Composition at Genoa and Venice in the Early Thirteenth Century". In Pryor, John (ed.). Logistics of Warfare in the Age of the Crusades: Proceedings of a Workshop Held at the Centre for Medieval Studies, University of Sydney, 30 September to 4 October 2002. Aldershot: Ashgate Publishing, Ltd. pp. 63–76. ISBN 978-0-7546-5197-0.
- Failler, Albert (1980). "Chronologie et composition dans l'Histoire de Georges Pachymère" [Chronology and composition in the History of George Pachymeres]. Revue des études byzantines (in French). 38: 5–103. doi:10.3406/rebyz.1980.2105.
- Geanakoplos, Deno John (1959). Emperor Michael Palaeologus and the West, 1258–1282: A Study in Byzantine-Latin Relations. Cambridge, Massachusetts: Harvard University Press.
- Imperiale di Sant'Angelo, Cesare, ed. (1926). Annali Genovesi di Caffaro e de'suoi continuatori, dal MCCLI al MCCLXXIX [Genoese Annals of Caffaro and of his continuators, from 1251 to 1279]. Fonti per la Storia d'Italia (in Italian and Latin). Rome: Instituto Storico Italiano. OCLC 257849033.
- Lane, Frederic Chapin (1973). Venice, A Maritime Republic. Baltimore, Maryland: Johns Hopkins University Press. ISBN 0-8018-1445-6.
- Manfroni, Camillo (1902). Storia della marina italiana, dal Trattato di Ninfeo alla caduta di Constantinopoli (1261–1453) [History of the Italian navy, from the Treaty of Nymphaeum to the Fall of Constantinople (1261–1453)] (in Italian). Livorno: R. Accademia navale. OCLC 265927738.
- Setton, Kenneth M. (1976). The Papacy and the Levant (1204–1571), Volume I: The Thirteenth and Fourteenth Centuries. Vol. 1. Philadelphia: The American Philosophical Society. ISBN 0-87169-114-0.
- Wiel, Alethea (1910). The Navy of Venice. New York: E. P. Dutton and Company. OCLC 4198755.
