= Military history of the Republic of Venice =

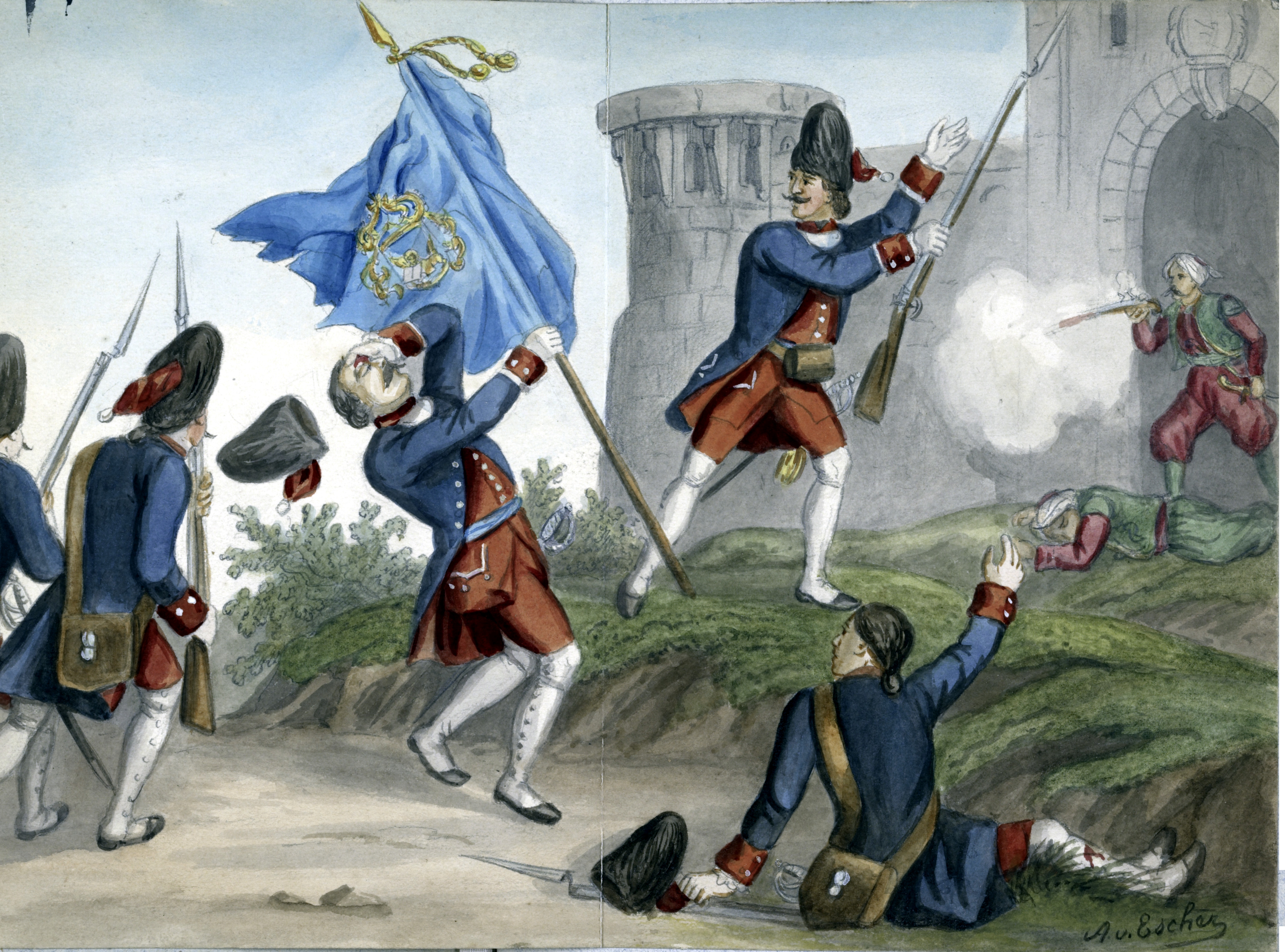
Grenadiers of the Venetian army attacking an Ottoman fort in Dalmatia during the Seventh Ottoman–Venetian War, 1717

The military history of the Republic of Venice started shortly after its founding, spanning a period from the 9th century until the Republic's fall in the 18th century. Military conflict between Venice and Italy began in the early 9th century with the intervention of Charlemagne's son King Pepin of Italy into Venice, which resulted in a failed six-month siege.

Venice first became a major military power in the 13th century during the Fourth Crusade, where Venetian troops participated in the successful siege and conquest of Constantinople, gaining vast territories and other war spoils. Later in the century, Venice commenced a series of wars with the Republic of Genoa and a number of its allies for dominance in the Mediterranean Sea. With the rise of the Ottoman Empire, the Republic lost its territories in the east as Cyprus and Venetian strongholds in Morea were occupied; at the same time, the rise of the Visconti of Milan drew Venice into the condottiere warfare of Italy.

The 14th century saw Venice successfully siege the northern Dalmatian town of Zadar with some 20,000 troops, as part of the Croatian-Venetian wars. Bereft of her Mediterranean possessions, Venice turned to conquest on the Italian mainland, which brought it into conflict with Milan and the Papacy. Venetian participation in the Italian Wars eventually resulted in the War of the League of Cambrai, where Venice was nearly reduced. Following the War of the League of Cognac, Venice played little further role in mainland warfare. She continued to fight naval wars against the Ottomans, however, culminating in the victory at the Battle of Lepanto.

The beginning of the 17th century saw a war against Austria and others over Uskok pirates. In the latter half of the 17th century, further Ottoman aspirations to capture Crete caused another protracted period of warfare, known as the Cretan War. The twenty-year Siege of Candia was followed by her involvement in the Great Turkish War, where the Republic briefly regained the Morea, only to return it some years later. The Republic of Venice was finally drawn into European warfare with Napoleon's invasion of Italy; unable to resist his armies, she was forced to surrender and become a French tributary state.

== 9th century ==
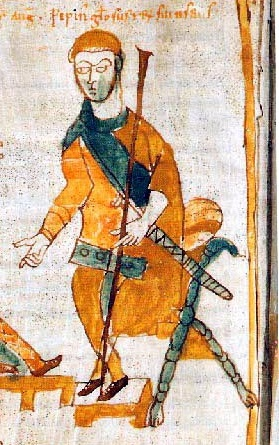
A depiction of Pepin from a 10th century manuscript

=== Pepin's siege of Venice (810) ===
In 804, an agreement to cede sovereignty of parts of Venice was made between the exiled Patriarch of Grado, Fortunatus, and Doge Obelerio Degli Antenori. By 810, with the Doge's political power weakening, Charlemagne's son King Pepin of Italy had militarily intervened in the Republic in response, seeking to occupy the city. Pepin's army, which set out from Ravenna in 810, succeeded in putting down opposing forces in Chioggia and Pellestrina, but faced heavy resistance near the Malamocco channel, particularly around the presently named Lido di Venezia island. Constantine VII, the fourth Emperor of the Macedonian dynasty of the Byzantine Empire, described in his historical treatise De Administrando Imperio (written in the 10th century) the failed attempts of Pippin to siege Malamocco on Lido:

The Venetians would man their ships and take up position behind the spars they had laid down, and king Pippin would take up position with his army along the shore. The Venetians assailed them with arrows and javelins, and stopped them from crossing over to the island. So then king Pippin, at a loss, said to the Venetians: "You are beneath my hand and my providence, since you are of my country and domain." But the Venetians answered him: "We want to be servants of the emperor of the Romans, and not of you." When, however, they had for long been straitened by the trouble that had come upon them, the Venetians made a treaty of peace with king Pippin, agreeing to pay him a very considerable tribute.

The siege lasted 6 months and resulted in heavy losses to Pepin's army due to local diseases, and an overall failure to take Venice, with King Pepin dying on 8 July 810. It also resulted in Doge Obelerio's exile from Venice, which lasted two decades until his doomed return in 832.

== 13th century ==
=== Sack of Constantinople (1204) ===
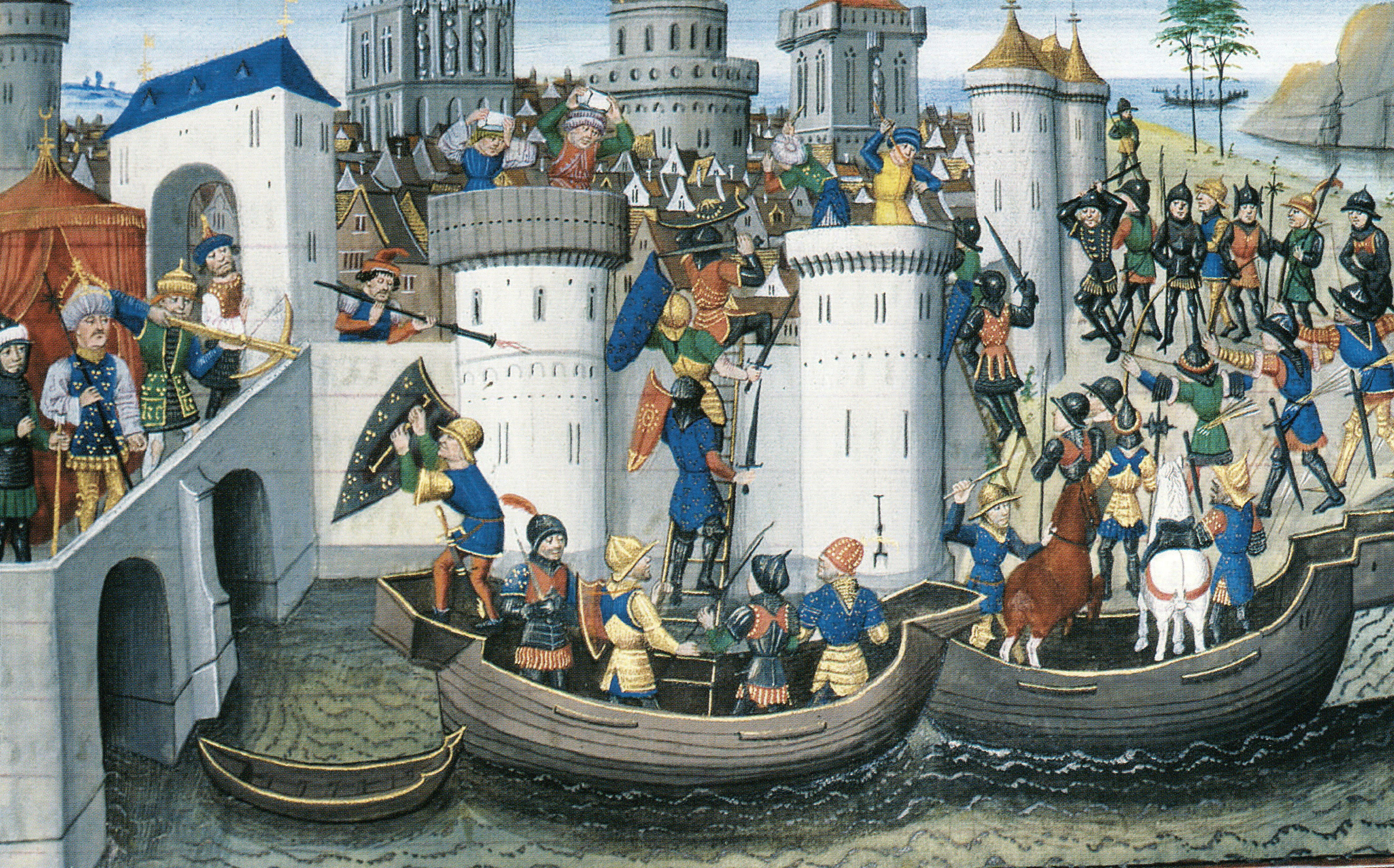
A 15th century miniature depicting the assault, created by David Aubert

On 9 April 1204, as part of the Fourth Crusade, Venetian ships combined with numerous Crusader forces started their assault on the Byzantine capital Constantinople, after Byzantine Emperor Alexios I of Trebizond refused to provide the Crusader army with money to assist the Crusade. Venice contributed 110 to 150 horse-transport galleys, 50 to 60 war galleys and around 50 troop transport ships.

By 12 April, forces from Venetian assault ships, blown ashore by strong winds, had taken control of a Byzantine tower near the Golden Horn. These ships carried scaling ladders and were resistant to enemy incendiary weapons, being covered with vine-cuttings. Only four or five of these ships were able to reach the towers, but were nonetheless successful in assisting Crusader forces in breaking the siege. According to an account of the siege by the Picardy knight Robert de Clari, this first contact, combined with a second tower breach by the Venetians, allowed Crusader forces on the ground to breach a postern gate, breaking the siege and commencing the main ground assault.

Following heavy looting and vandalism by Crusader forces following the retreat of Byzantine forces, the Byzantine Empire was divided between the Crusade's participants following the signing of a treaty. Venice nominally gained vast territories, including the island of Crete, Corfu, and a number of cities in Eastern Thrace, but only received a portion of these territories in actuality (such as Crete, which became the Kingdom of Candia), owing to instability and the failure of Venice's numerous attempts to assert power.

=== War of Saint Sabas (1256–1270) ===
As part of the beginning of the Venetian–Genoese Wars, in 1256 Venice commenced warfare with the Republic of Genoa. The conflict started with the siege of Acre following a dispute over land claimed by both Genoa and Venice, with the siege comprising most of the war's subsequent combat. Early Genoese gains were erased by the entry of the Republic of Pisa into the war on Venice's side, with Venice's forces breaking chains in Acre's harbour and attacking with as many as 60 siege engines in 1257.

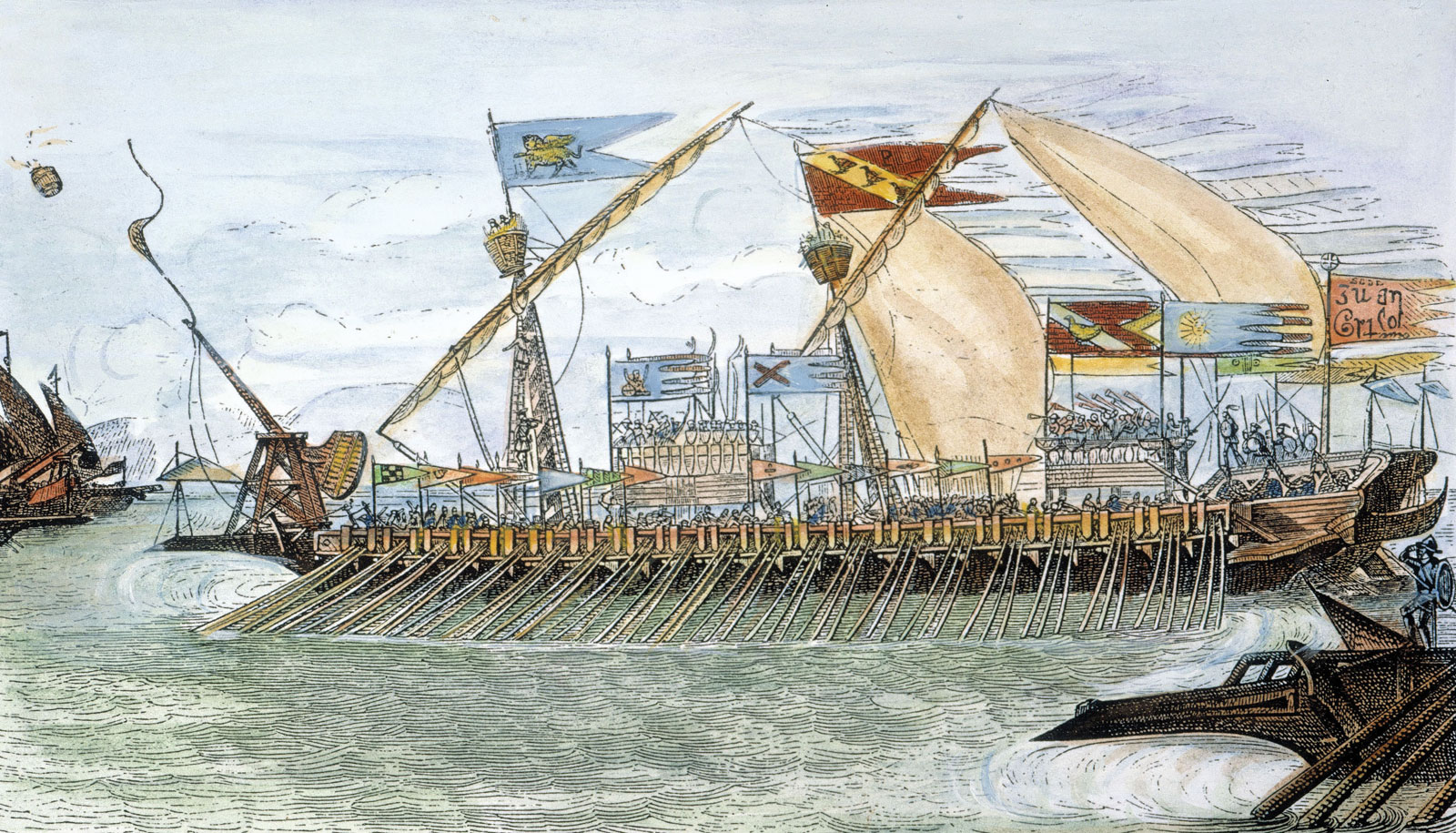
A 19th century depiction of a typical 13th century Venetian ship

The ensuing year-long blockade was partially broken by a later Genoese naval counter-attack in June 1258, with Philip of Montfort assisting Genoa with his forces. However, the Venetian ships were able to eventually overwhelm these attacking forces. Despite the blockade, the siege defenders were not deprived of food, owing to assistance and supplies from Philip of Montfort and the nearby Hospitallers. By 1261, conflict had subsided and largely consisted of naval skirmishes for the rest of the conflict.

The first half of 1263 saw a 32-ship strong Venetian naval force defeat a fleet of 48 Genoese ships near the Greek island Spetses, in what is known as the Battle of Settepozzi. The next major naval battle took place on 14 August 1264, with much of the Venetian fleet being captured or sunk by a larger Genoese fleet, in what is known as the Battle of Saseno. The final naval engagement occurred on 23 June 1266, and resulted in a clear Venetian victory, with 24 Genoese galleys being captured by Venetian forces.

The Peace of Cremona in 1270 concluded the war, with France and the Kingdom of Sicily organising the peace treaty between Venice and Genoa.

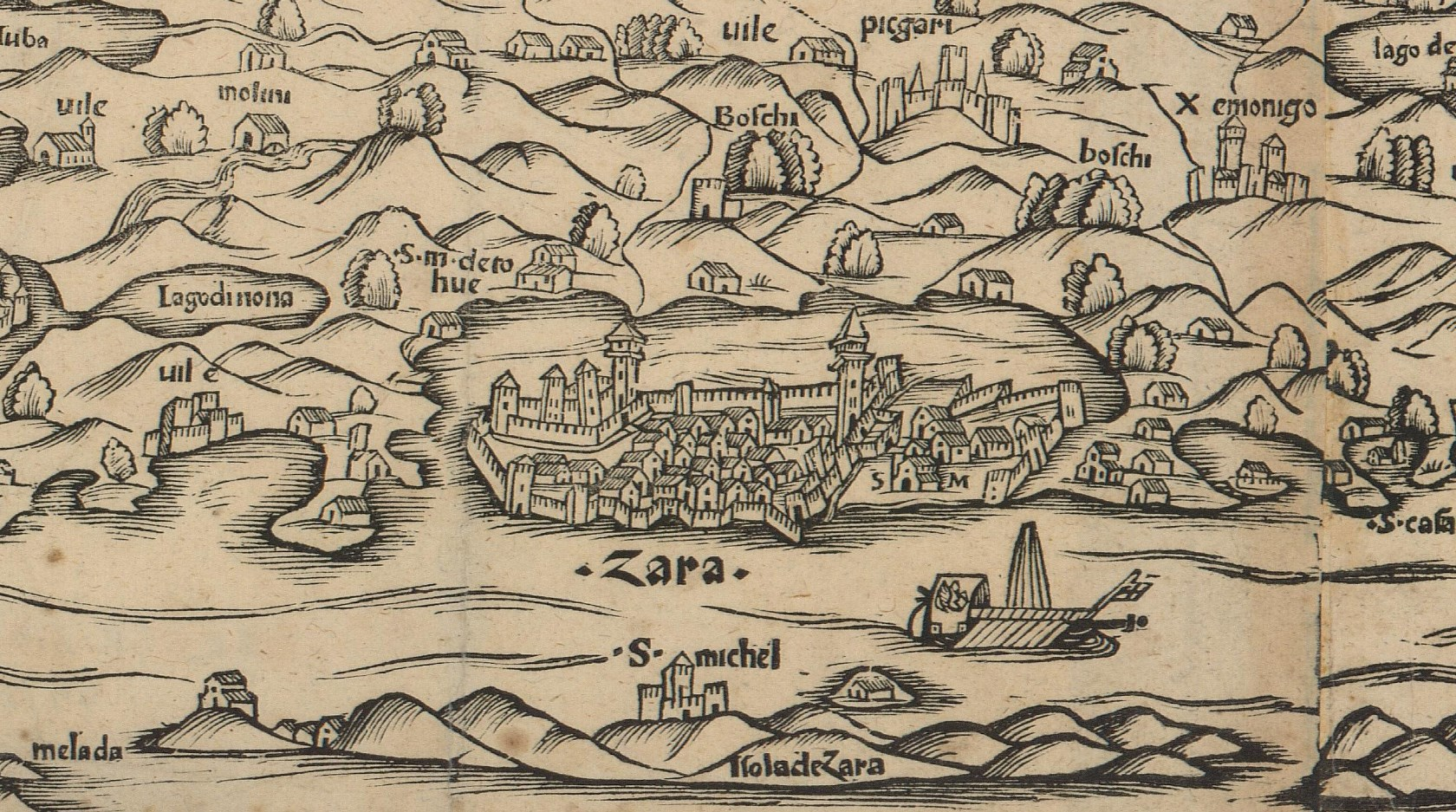
A 16th century map of Zadar and the surrounding areas by Venetian cartographer Matteo Pagano

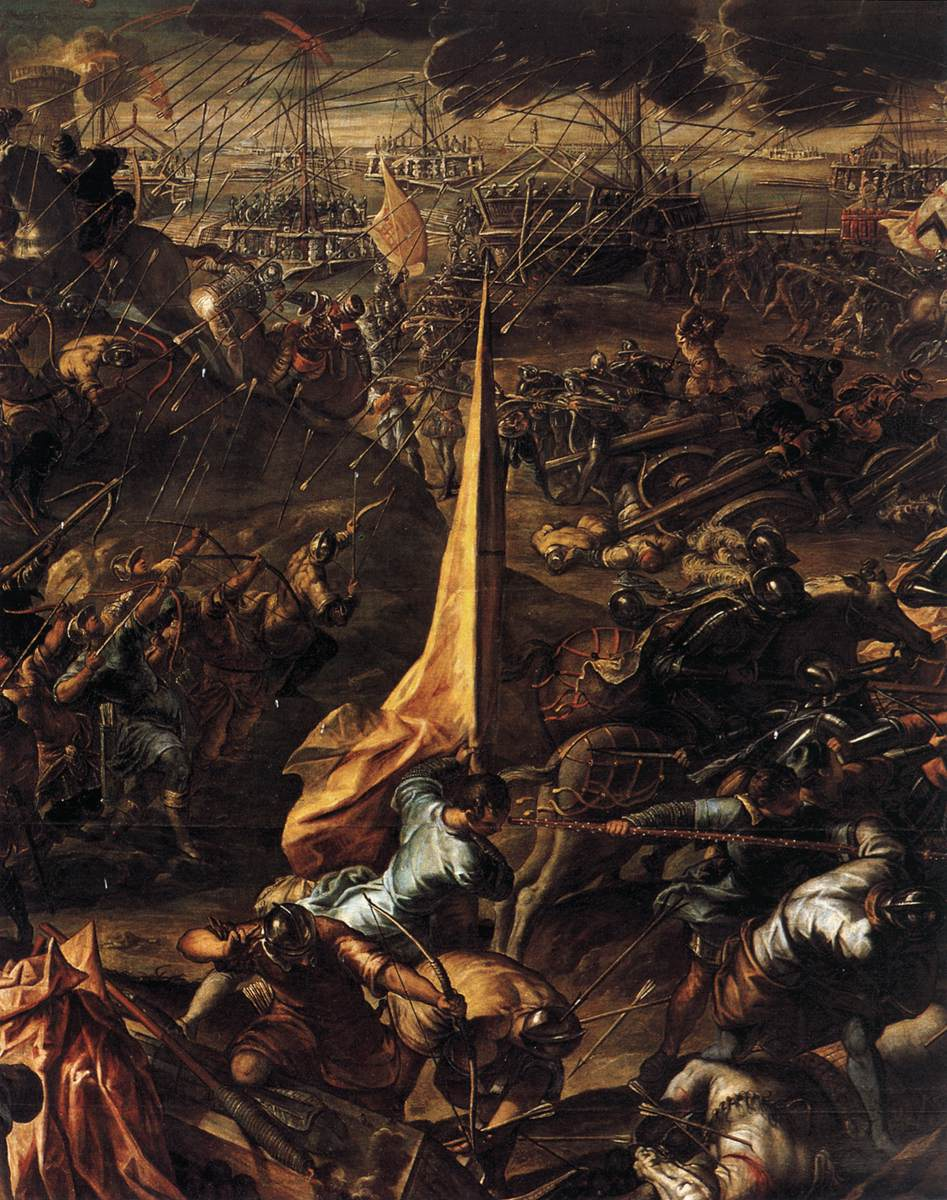
A depiction of the attack on Zadar, painted by Tintoretto in 1584

== 14th century ==
=== Siege of Zadar (1345–1346) ===
In 1345, as part of the Croatian-Venetian wars, some 20,000 or more Venetian troops were sent to capture Zadar, a Croatian city in northern Dalmatia. According to the 14th century Croatian manuscript Obsidio Iadrensis (Latin, the English title is Siege of Zadar), these forces were joined by twelve ships arriving in Zadar on August 12, 1345, led by Commander-in-Chief Peter da Canale. A 16-month long siege ensued, with Venetian land and naval forces attempting a number of military operations to break the siege. The manuscript describes da Canale unsuccessfully attempting to break chains in Zadar's port at the beginning of the siege, on September 6, 1345.

However, the harbour chain was eventually broken in January 1346, allowing greater Venetian control of the harbour. The Venetian army's first major offensive on the city started on May 16 but failed, leading to a large counterattack by combined Croatian-Hungarian forces (the Croatians were joined by King Louis' forces following the first offensive) on July 1. According to the Obsidio Iadrensis, this counterattack was later defeated with the help of the Venetian fleet. Later in the year, on 21 December, Venetian forces led by land commander Marko Giustinian entered Zadar, breaking the siege.

== 15th century ==
Until the beginning of the 15th century the Venetian power had been exclusively maritime, so that the entire military organization of the State had been focused on the fleet and the military corps linked to it: Arsenalotti, Schiavoni and Fanti da Mar. To this main nucleus were then added the cavalry corps provided by the maritime domains: Stradioti, Cimarioti and Sfaxioti.

It was only the conquest of the Stato de tera, rapidly developed at the beginning of the century, that generated the need for the Venetian State to equip itself with a land army. The solution, was the massive recourse to mercenary companies, which guaranteed a lesser weight on public finances, linked only to the war periods, and a certain reliability, if compared to the scarce experience of Venice in the country war. The recourse to mercenary troops, however, posed at the same time a problem linked to their possible unstable loyalty to the State. If, on the one hand, maritime power and complete control of the lagoons guaranteed security against possible coups d'état, on the other hand, entrusting the control of a mercenary army to the members of the Venetian patriciate, as well as not giving guarantees of ability in land warfare, could have created concentrations of power extremely dangerous for the political equilibrium of the Republic. For this reason, in times of war, when there was a massive recruitment of mercenaries, it was customary to assign the same title of Captain General of the Mainland to the same captains of fortune, assigning to the Venetian nobles tasks of support and control over the military operation.

=== Pandolfo Malatesta, Savelli and Galeazzo (1404–1405) ===
In 1404 Venice entered the war against the Carraresi of Padua, who threatened the territories of the Dogado and the trade routes to and from the hinterland. The command was given to Pandolfo Malatesta, appointed Captain General. In 1405 the command was transferred to Paolo Savelli, who soon died trying to take Padua. He then succeeded him as Captain General Galeazzo Cattaneo de Grumello, under whose leadership the city of Padua was finally conquered, putting an end to the lordship of the Carraresi.

=== Carmagnola (1425–1432) ===
In 1425 the Republic appointed Captain General Francesco Bussone, called the Carmagnola, in the war against the Visconti, which ended with victory at the Battle of Maclodio and the peace of 1428. Hostilities resumed in 1431, when the leader Bartolomeo Colleoni was also called to the service of Venice. The serious military upheavals suffered by the Venetian armies during this conflict, however, cost Carmagnola first the arrest on 8 April 1432, and finally the execution on 5 May of the same year.

=== Gattamelata (1434–1441) ===
A new Captain General was appointed in 1434, in the person of Erasmus of Narni called Il Gattamelata, leading the war against Milan until 1441.

=== Attendolo (1441–1448) ===
The Gattamelata was succeeded by the leader Michele Attendolo, already in the service of the Republic of Florence against Milan. During his command also operated under the Venetian insignia the mercenary captain Scaramuccia da Forlì, who distinguished himself in 1436 in the liberation of Brescia from the Visconti siege and in the liberation of Cremona in 1446. After the brief peace stipulated in 1447 with the Visconti, the rekindling of the conflict with the Ambrosian Republic led to the serious defeat in the battle of Caravaggio on 5 September 1448, against the forces led by his cousin Francesco Sforza: this defeat cost the Attendolo the deposition and confinement in the fortress of Conegliano. Venice, for its part, rose from the defeat first supporting Sforza himself in an attempt to gain control of Milan, then abandoning him abruptly to sign peace with the Ambrosian Republic.

=== Malatesta (1449–1453) ===
Soon the Republic was forced to take up arms again, entrusting the command to Sigismondo Pandolfo Malatesta, Lord of Rimini, to support Milan, threatened by the Sforza, who nevertheless managed, in 1450, to overthrow the Ambrosian Republic and be proclaimed Duke of Milan. The conflict dragged on until 1453, when a treaty with the new Duke of Milan restored the borders to the pre-conflict conditions.

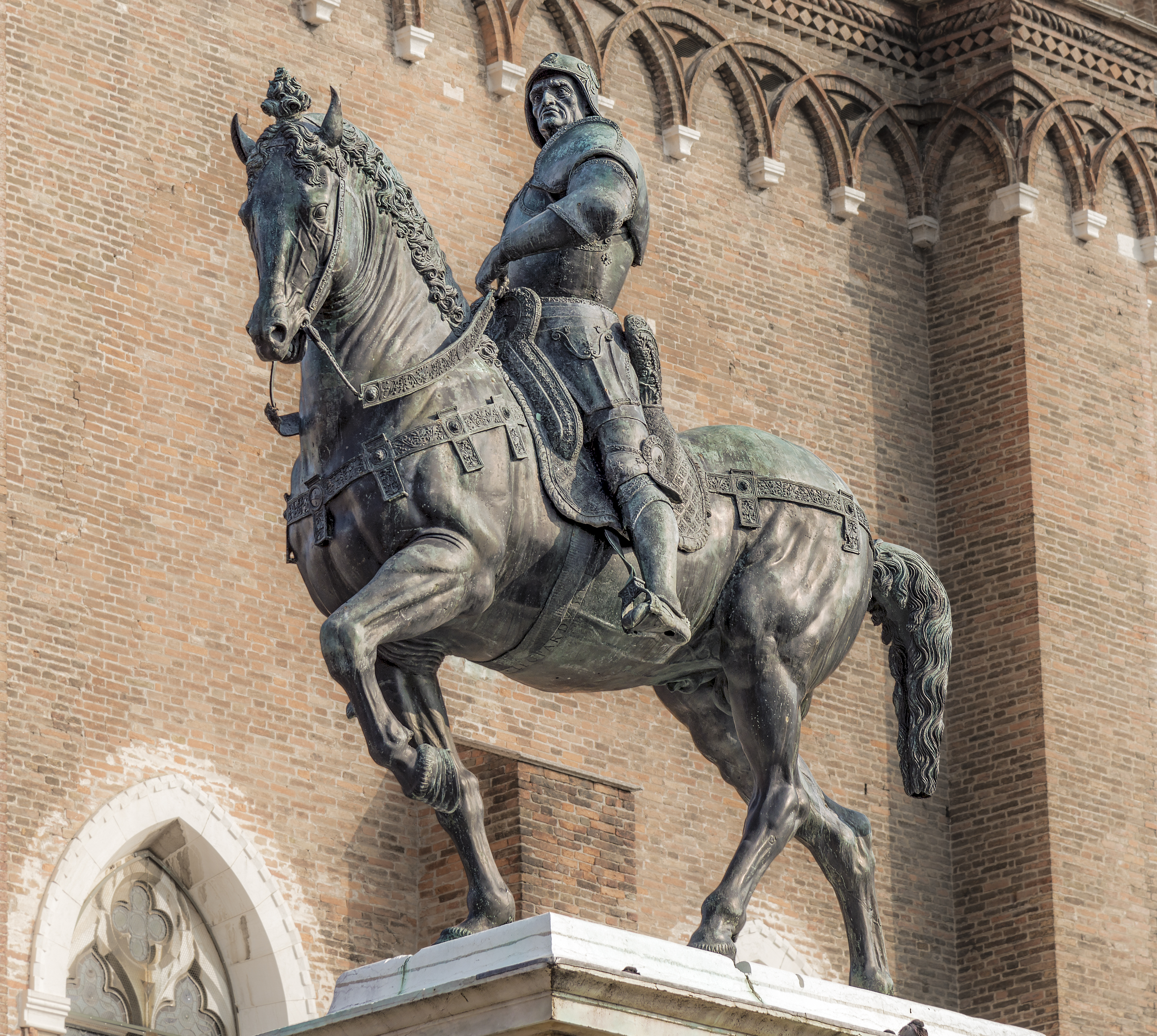
Statue of Bartolomeo Colleoni by Andrea del Verrocchio

=== Colleoni (1453–1475) ===
From 1448 to 1451, Venice still availed itself of the service of the Colleoni, who, after several times having served the Republic and now the Sforza, in 1453 was appointed head of the armies of the Serenissima. The peace of Lodi signed the following year, however, forced the leader to a long inactivity, while remaining in the service of Venice until his death in 1475.

=== Sanseverino (1482-1485 and 1487) ===
In 1482 the Republic entered into conflict with Ferrara in the Salt War, declaring war on 2 May 1482 and at the same time entrusting the command of operations to Roberto di San Severino, appointed for the occasion Lieutenant General and patrician from Veneto, flanked by provveditore Antonio Loredan and Damiano Moro, captain of the fleet. Occupied Rovigo and the Polesine, on November 6 the battle of Argenta was won and the Po River was crossed. On 16 May 1483, faced with the defection of the papal allies, Venice also hired the Duke Renato di Lorena, while appointing Antonio Giustinian Captain General in Po, soon captured, however, by the Ferraresi. The conflict ended with the peace of Bagnolo on 7 August 1484, which recognised the occupation of Polesine and Rovigo. The Sanseverino then abandoned the arms of Venice in 1485 to pass under the papal insignia.

Remaining until that moment neutral in the Italian conflicts, in April 1487 the arrest of all Venetian merchants in the lands of the Archduchy of Austria pushed the Republic to the conflict. The commander Julius Caesar of Camerino was appointed Captain General, flanked by the provveditori Pietro Diedo and Girolamo Marcello. The fall of Rovereto pushed Venice to dismiss da Camerino, calling Roberto Sanseverino, accompanied by his son Antonio, back into service. Despite the reconquest of Rovereto, the defeat on 10 August at the castle of Petra caused a retreat that cost the life of the Captain General himself during the crossing of the Adige River. However, the serious losses also suffered by the Germans led to the signing of the peace treaty on 13 November of the same year.

=== Gonzaga (1489–1498) ===
In 1489 the command was entrusted to Francesco Gonzaga, with whom the First Italian War against France was victoriously conducted. Gonzaga left the service of Venice at the end of the conflict, in 1498, when, after being accused of not capturing the King of France Charles VIII during the battle of Fornovo, he passed into the service of the enemies of Venice.

== 17th century ==
=== Uskok War (1615–1618) ===
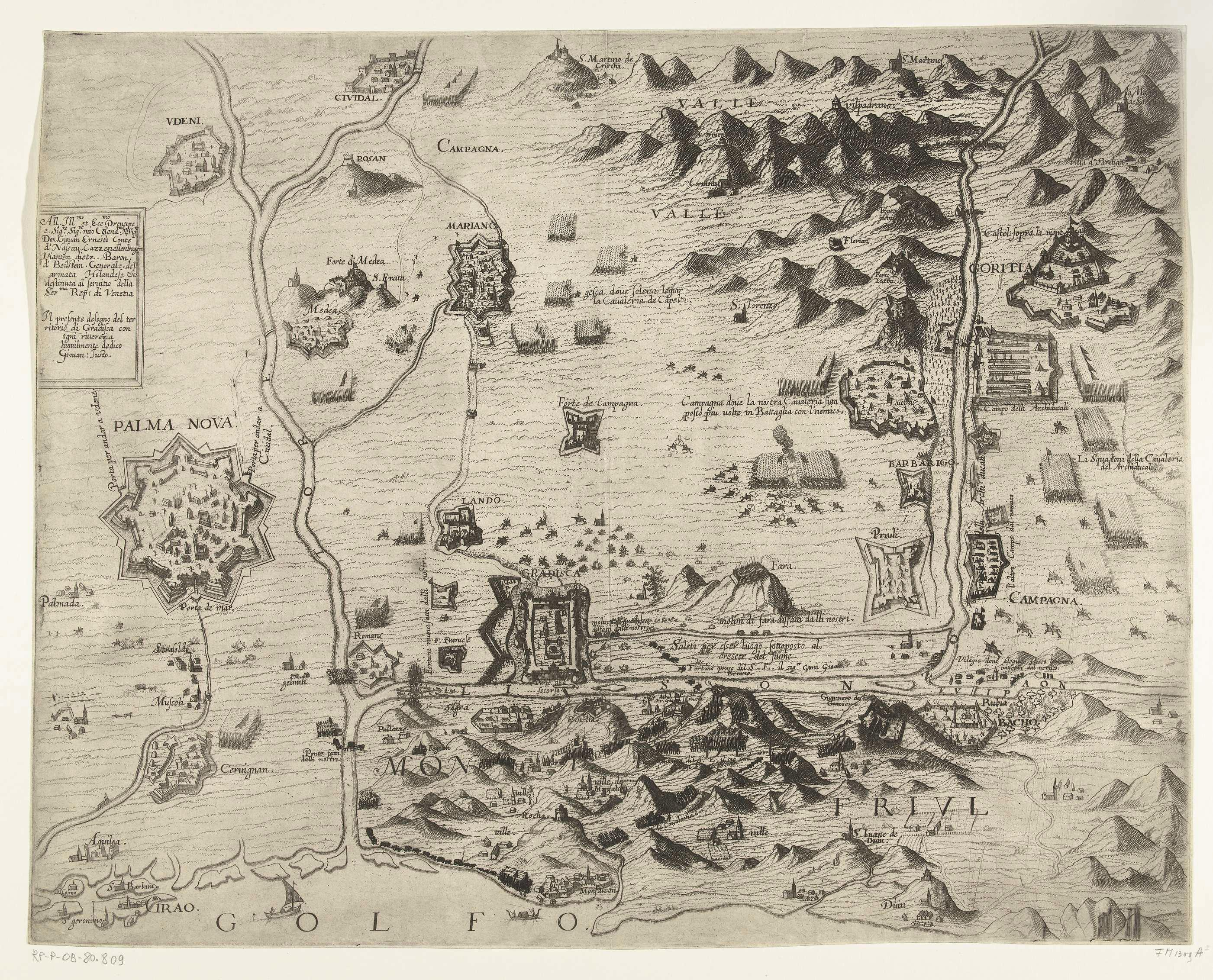
A map of the siege of the Gradisca fortress, created in 1616

In response to escalating attacks on Venetian ships by Uskok pirates, who were hired by Austria, the Doge Giovanni Bembo declared war on Austria. Austria was assisted by Spanish and Croatian forces, while Venice sought assistance in the latter part of the war from the Dutch and the English.

Clashes along the Soča river began the war in the early summer of 1615, but remained minor until 1616, when Venetian forces began their siege of the fortress San Servolo, located twenty miles from the Gulf of Trieste. Major warfare continued later in the year, with the Venetian siege of Gradisca (which lasted until September 1617) and various other battles beginning around this time.

=== Cretan War (1645–1669) ===
After formally gaining control of Crete in 1204 following the success of the Fourth Crusade, Venice administered the island from 1212 onwards as the Kingdom of Candia, with resistance by the local population occurring frequently in subsequent decades. Direct conflict with the Ottoman Empire over control of the island began in 1645. The war began following Ottoman accusations of Venetian collusion with the Knights of Malta in their large attack on an Ottoman convoy in 1644; the Knights had later sailed their gains to southern Crete, landing there for safe harbour. After the breakdown of negotiations, which included the accusation that the Venetians on Crete had bought stolen goods from the Knights, a Turkish armada of around 416 ships arrived and disembarked in the north-west of Crete, near Chania, beginning the war. A fleet of vessels donated by Tuscany, the Papal States (sent by Pope Innocent X), Naples and Malta was sent following this invasion, combining with the Venetian fleet to finally launch a doomed counterattack on 1 October 1645.

Distracted and weakened by the ongoing Thirty Years War, European states rejected Venetian pleas for assistance as Ottoman advances on cities such as Rethymno quickened in October 1646. By 1648, most of the island was controlled by the Ottomans, though sieges such as the siege of Candia and of other minor Venetian strongholds were ongoing. Candia's siege, an Ottoman attempt to capture the island's capital, lasted another 22 years, constituting a major part of the remaining land warfare of the conflict.

==== Naval warfare ====
Seeking to counter the early Ottoman land advances through naval warfare, Venice attempted to blockade the Dardanelles strait in 1646, hoping to block the delivery of new supplies and troops intended for the Ottoman land assault. These efforts largely failed and the war did not see major naval warfare until a fleet commanded by Alvise Mocenigo successfully defeated a larger Ottoman fleet near the Greek island of Naxos.

Major naval battles of this next period of the war include the four battles of the Dardanelles, which took place from 1654 to 1657:

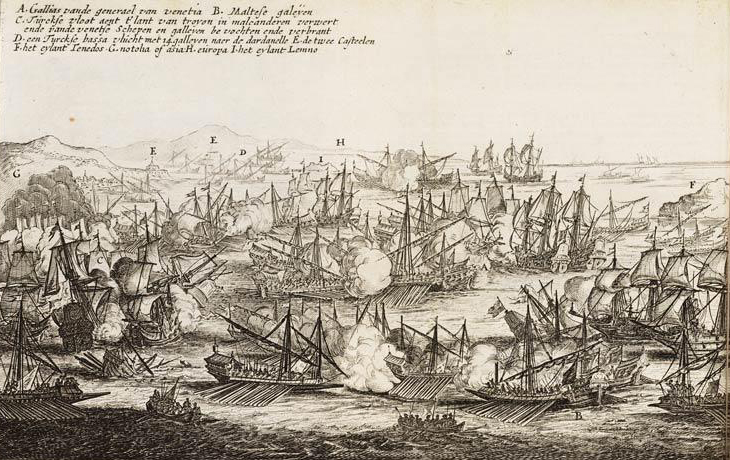
A 1657 depiction of the third battle of Dardanelles (26 June 1656)

- The first battle commenced on 16 May 1654, and consisted of 115 Ottoman vessels fighting only 17 Venetian vessels. It resulted in heavy losses on both sides, with a manuscript describing the Turks even considering the battle a loss.
- The second battle took place on 21 June 1655, near the island of Milos - the Ottomans faced 22 galleys, 33 sailing ships and 6 galleasses, but lost the battle despite having a greater number of forces.
- The third battle took place on 26 June 1656, inside the Dardanelles. 67 Venetian ships, including 31 galleys, engaged in combat with 98 Ottoman ships, including 61 galleys. Venice won this battle easily, incurring heavy losses on the Ottomans and occupying Tenedos and Lemnos - this allowed a short blockade of the Strait that lasted until the start of the summer.
- Countering the blockade, the 4th and final battle of the Dardanelles took place on 17 July 1657. 47 Ottoman vessels were able to overwhelm 67 Venetian vessels, breaking the blockade on 19 July, although not without a greater number of Ottoman losses.

Following the collapse of the Venetian blockade on 19 July 1657, no major naval warfare was seen until 8 March 1668, when Venice successfully fought off 12 Ottoman galleys and 2,000 Ottoman troops attempting to seize Venetian galleys. The battle lasted five hours, with a number of Ottoman galleys captured by the Venetians.

==== Land warfare ====
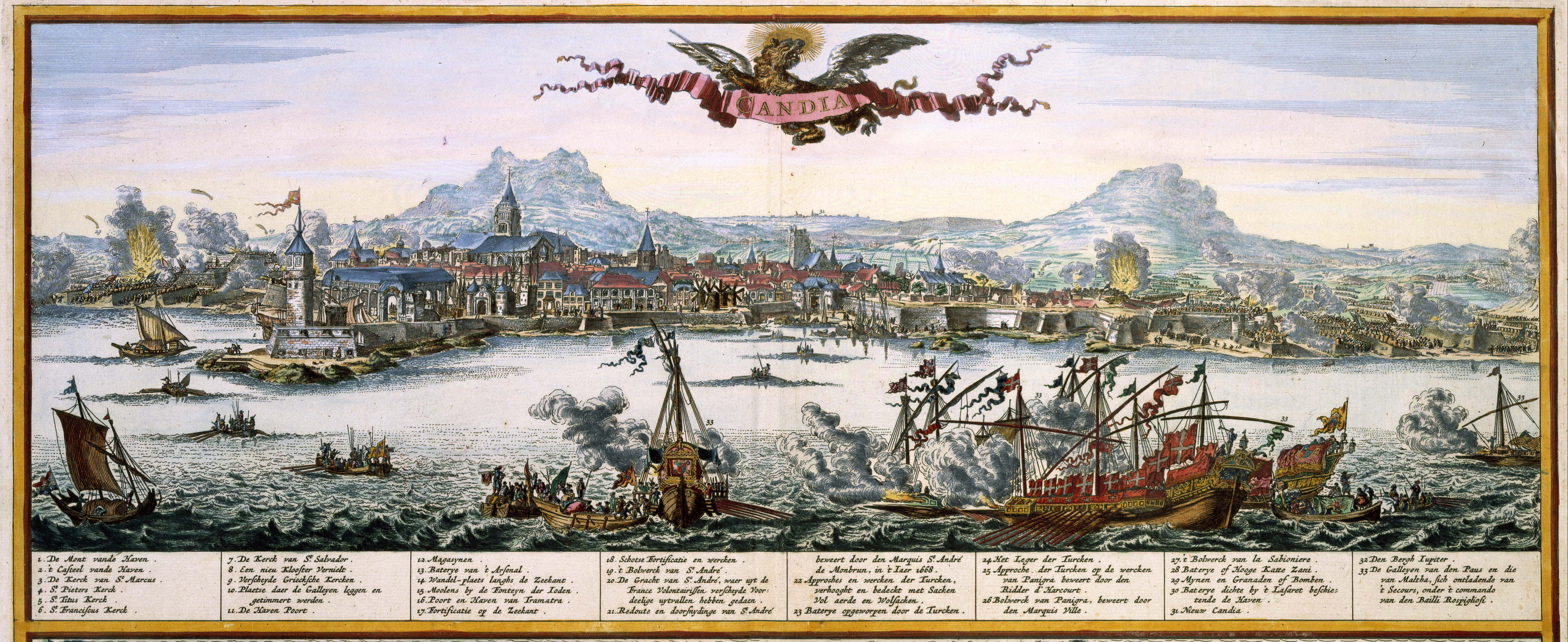
A depiction of Candia and the Ottoman siege, painted c. 1690

No major land warfare was seen until the winter of 1666/1667, when on 22 May some 15,000 Ottoman troops started to break the siege of Candia. After another 28 months of warfare, the Ottomans forced a peace treaty upon Doge Francesco Morosini on 6 September 1669, ending the siege.
