= Byzantine–Venetian treaty of 1268 =

Temporary peace treaty

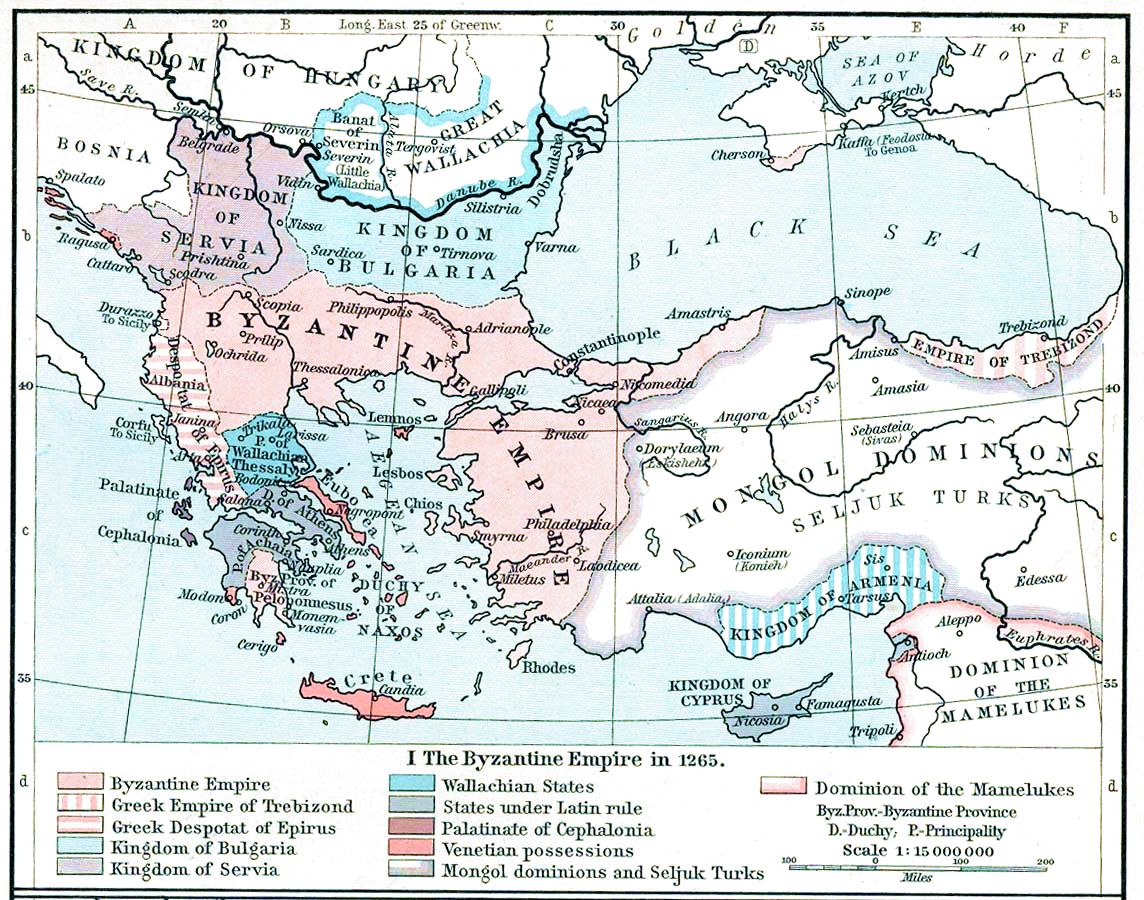
- The restored Byzantine Empire of Michael VIII Palaiologos, and its neighbours, in 1265 (William R. Shepherd, Historical Atlas, 1911)
- Type: Five-year non-aggression pact and commercial treaty
- Signed: 4 April 1268
- Location: Constantinople
- Parties: Byzantine Empire; Republic of Venice

In 1268, the Byzantine Empire and the Republic of Venice agreed to temporarily end hostilities which had erupted after the Byzantine recovery of Constantinople by Emperor Michael VIII Palaiologos in 1261.

Venice had enjoyed a privileged position in the Constantinople-based Latin Empire established by the Fourth Crusade in 1204, while Palaiologos had allied with Venice's main commercial rival, the Republic of Genoa, against them. The loss of Constantinople to Palaiologos was a heavy blow to Venice's political and commercial position in the East, as it cut off access to the Black Sea, and gave the Genoese privileged access instead. A naval war against Genoa and Byzantium followed, but despite a significant Venetian victory at the Battle of Settepozzi in 1263, it failed to produce decisive results. Nevertheless, Palaiologos became dissatisfied with the Genoese military performance, and the two allies grew increasingly mistrustful towards each other, leading the Byzantine emperor to seek a rapprochement with Venice.

A first treaty was concluded in 1265 but not ratified by Venice. Finally, the rise of Charles of Anjou in Italy and his hegemonic ambitions in the wider region, which threatened both Venice and the Byzantines, provided additional incentive for both powers to seek an accommodation. A new treaty was concluded in April 1268, with terms and wording more favourable to the Byzantines. It provided for a mutual truce of five years, the release of prisoners, and readmitted and regulated the presence of Venetian merchants in the Empire. Many of the trading privileges they had previously enjoyed were restored, but on considerably less advantageous terms to Venice than what Palaiologos had been willing to concede in 1265. The Byzantines were forced to recognize the Venetian possession of Crete and other areas captured after the Fourth Crusade, but succeeded in avoiding a full rupture with Genoa, while removing for a time the threat of a Venetian fleet assisting Charles of Anjou in his plans to capture Constantinople.

== Background ==
In the aftermath of the Sack of Constantinople by the Fourth Crusade in 1204, the Republic of Venice, which had provided the Crusaders with their fleet, received many of the spoils of the fallen Byzantine capital, plus three-eighths of the city, and numerous strategically positioned colonies, including Crete. This event opened the Black Sea to Venetian trade, while Venetian influence in Constantinople ensured that throughout the newly established Latin Empire, the Venetians gained a privileged position, which secured their ascendancy over their old commercial rivals, the fellow Italian maritime republics of Pisa and Genoa.

=== Byzantine–Genoese–Venetian relations after 1261 ===
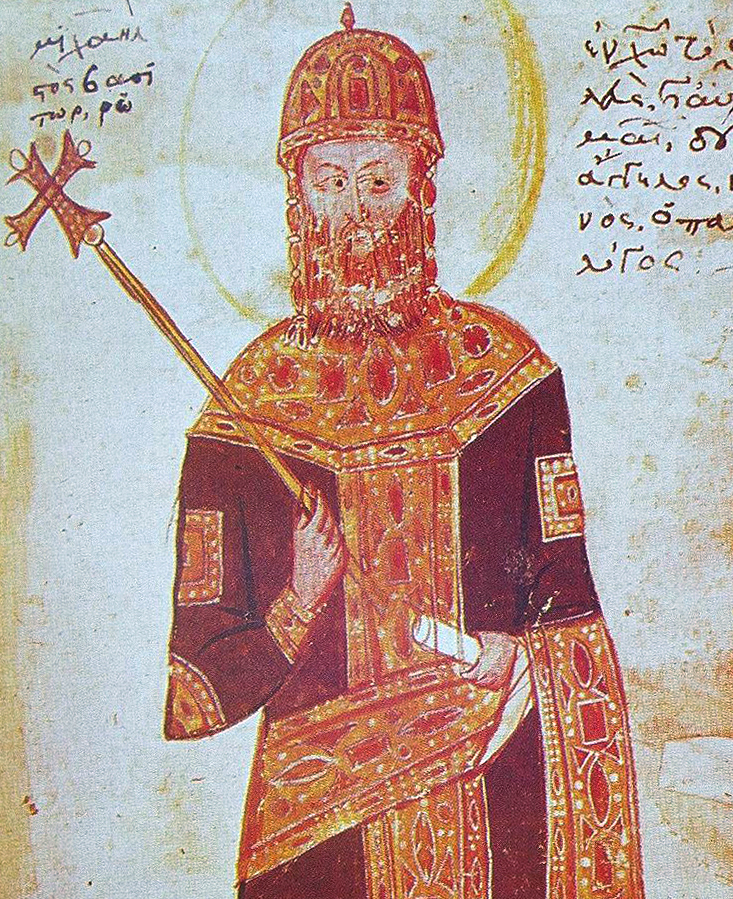
Emperor Michael VIII Palaiologos (14th-century miniature from George Pachymeres' History)

In 1261, the Nicaean emperor, Michael VIII Palaiologos, recaptured Constantinople and re-established the Byzantine Empire under the Palaiologos dynasty. This represented a major blow to the position and interests of Venice. Furthermore, Palaiologos had allied with the Genoese in the Treaty of Nymphaeum; the Genoese were at war with Venice, and aimed to use their fleet to counter the mighty Venetian navy that threatened their designs on Constantinople. This agreement not only gave the Genoese great privileges, but also assigned them the former quarters and property of the Venetians in Constantinople and threatened to exclude the Venetians from the Black Sea trade.

Initially, the Venetians supported the exiled Latin Emperor, Baldwin II, in his efforts to assemble a new Crusade and reclaim his throne, and Venetian diplomacy henceforth "served to bind together Latin projects to retake the capital", in the words of Deno Geanakoplos. Barred from the Black Sea and Constantinople by her rival, Genoa, Venice now followed a two-pronged strategy of using the Papacy and the threat of excommunication to pry the Genoese away from the Byzantines, and of obtaining the assistance of other Western powers, like Manfred of Sicily, for a campaign against Palaiologos. In the meantime, Venetian naval activity in the Aegean Sea did not provide any concrete results. In the summer of 1262, the Venetians ordered a 37-galley fleet into the Aegean, which met the Genoese fleet of 60 ships at Thessalonica, but the Genoese refused to engage. A piratical foray by the nobles of Negroponte, allied with Venice, into the Marmara Sea was confronted and defeated by a Byzantine–Genoese squadron.

In 1263, however, the Battle of Settepozzi ended in a clear Venetian victory, and much diminished the value of the Genoese alliance in the eyes of Palaiologos. The Byzantine emperor was furthermore annoyed by the Genoese captains' preference for attacking Venetian shipping for booty rather than assisting in supplying his forces fighting in the Morea, and concerned at the growth of Genoese influence in his own capital, where they threatened to acquire even more of a stranglehold on commerce than the Venetians had ever possessed. Soon after the battle, Michael VIII dismissed sixty Genoese ships from his service. Both sides became increasingly mistrustful of each other, and the Emperor began to delay the payments for the crews of the Genoese ships. The Byzantine–Genoese rift widened further in 1264, when the Genoese podestà in Constantinople was implicated in a plot to surrender the city to Manfred of Sicily, whereupon the Emperor expelled the Genoese from the city to Heraclea Perinthus.

=== Unratified treaty of 1265 ===
Palaiologos then sent a Venetian prisoner of war, Arrigo Trevisano, as his envoy to Venice. Doge Reniero Zeno sent Trevisano back to Constantinople, along with Benedetto Grillone, who in turn were replaced by Jacopo Dolfin and Jacopo Contarini. On 18 June 1265, a first treaty of truce was signed by Palaiologos and the Venetian envoys in Constantinople. Its terms were highly advantageous to the Venetians, and would, in the opinion of Geanakoplos, almost restore to her the position she had enjoyed before 1261. The Greek and Latin texts of the treaty are preserved in the collection of Venetian diplomatic documents compiled by Gottlieb Tafel and Georg Thomas and published by the Imperial Academy of Sciences in Vienna.

Its main provisions were:

1. The cession to Venice of designated quarters for her colonists in Constantinople, Thessalonica, and other Byzantine cities, with the recognition of a Venetian bailo as the chief Venetian official in the Empire
2. Venetian merchants were exempted from all taxes in the Empire
3. The Genoese were to be entirely expelled from the Empire, and any future Byzantine treaties with Genoa would require the consent of Venice
4. Venice would remain at peace with the Byzantines even if a friendly power—the Papacy, France, Sicily, Castile, Aragon, England, Charles of Anjou, Pisa, and Ancona were explicitly mentioned—should attack Constantinople
5. If the Genoese should attack Constantinople, Venice would come to the aid of the city with a fleet of equal size to that of Genoa
6. Venetian possession of Crete, and the two outposts of Modon and Coron on the Morea, were recognized by Palaiologos
7. Palaiologos received a free hand against the Latin lords of Negroponte, while the Venetian citizens there were prohibited from aiding them, in exchange for a guarantee of their own properties and position on the island
8. The other Latin territories in the Aegean captured after the Fourth Crusade, including the feudatories of the Principality of Achaea, were to be returned to Palaiologos

The treaty was not ratified by the Doge, for reasons that are unclear: according to Geanakoplos, either the Venetians interpreted Palaiologos' concessions as a sign of weakness, or mistrusted his ultimate intentions, since his desire to restore the Byzantine Empire to its pre-1204 boundaries was obvious and directly affected their own possessions in the area. Furthermore, as Donald Nicol points out, Zeno still cherished the title, adopted after 1204, of 'Lord of one-quarter and one-eighth of the Empire of Romania' (Latin: dominus quartae partis et dimidiae totius Imperii Romaniae), and would be loath to accept a treaty that recognized him merely as 'Doge of Venice and Lord of Croatia, Dalmatia, and the other places and islands subject to his authority' (Dux Venetiarum et dominator Chroatiae et Dalmatiae et omnium aliarum terrarum et insularum suae, Greek: δοὺξ Βενετίας καὶ ἐξουσιαστὴς Χορβατίας, Δαλματίας καὶ τῶν ὑπὸ τὴν ἐξουσίαν αὐτοῦ λοιπῶν χωρῶν τε καὶ νησίων) and that effectively diminished his standing and reverted the relations between Venice and Constantinople to the status quo before 1204. Venice may also have hoped to secure, or even augment, her position in the area with the aid of either Manfred of Sicily or the new and ambitious contender for supremacy in Italy, Charles of Anjou, whose ultimate designs on Constantinople were common knowledge—whence his inclusion in the draft treaty by Palaiologos.

=== Rise of Charles of Anjou ===
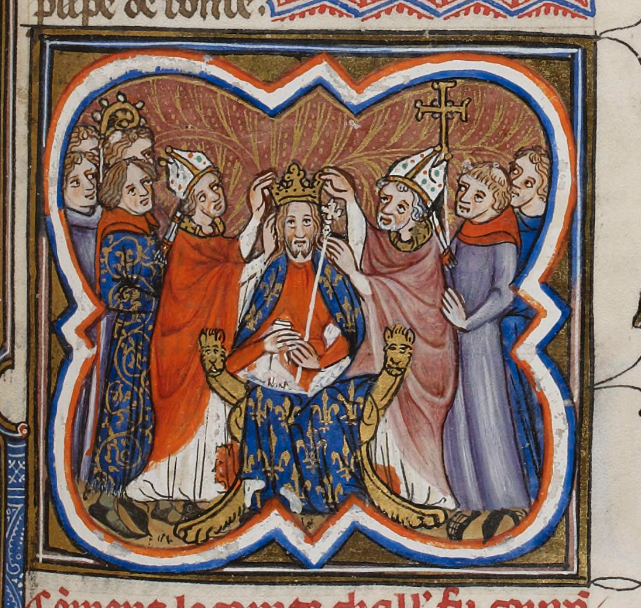
Coronation of Charles of Anjou as King of Sicily (14th-century miniature). His imperial ambitions forced Palaiologos to seek an accommodation with Venice.

Following his decisive victory over Manfred of Sicily at the Battle of Benevento in February 1266, Charles of Anjou became the effective master of Italy, and began to plan for the realization of his ambitions against Constantinople. His plans were made public with the Treaty of Viterbo in May 1267, concluded between Charles, the exiled Latin emperor, Baldwin, the Papacy, and the Principality of Achaea. Charles pledged to assist Baldwin in recovering his capital and territories that had once belonged to the Latin Empire, in exchange for several territorial concessions in the Aegean and the western Balkans, and the suzerainty over Achaea. In an effort to lure the cautious Venetians into the pact, they were promised the full restoration of the rights they had enjoyed after 1204. Concerned over Charles' ambitions, and with his previous treaty with Venice rendered null and void, Palaiologos was forced to turn again to Genoa, allowing the establishment of a Genoese colony in the suburb of Galata, across the Golden Horn from Constantinople.

These developments disquietened the Venetians as well: their trade with the East had suffered considerably following the Byzantine alliance with Genoa, while Charles of Anjou's imperial ambitions in the Adriatic and Greece were a potential threat to Venice's own freedom of access to the Mediterranean. Consequently, on 1 November 1267, Doge Reniero Zeno sent two plenipotentiary ambassadors, Marco Bembo and Pietro Zeno, to negotiate a treaty with Michael VIII Palaiologos.

== Treaty of 1268 ==
The Byzantine–Venetian treaty was concluded on 4 April 1268 at Constantinople. Michael VIII Palaiologos' position vis-à-vis Venice had improved in the years since 1265. As a result, the terms of the new treaty were considerably less advantageous to the Venetians, who furthermore felt compelled to recognize Palaiologos with the title imperator et moderator Romanorum ('emperor and governor of the Romans'), rather than Graecorum ('of the Greeks') as in 1265, and with the flattering appellation 'the new Constantine', which Palaiologos had adopted after recovering Constantinople. The treaty was ratified by Doge Zeno on 30 June, but he died a few days later. Palaiologos quickly sent ambassadors to Venice, George Tzimiskes and George Kalodoukas, who were able to secure its recognition by Zeno's successor, Lorenzo Tiepolo, on 30 July.

=== Terms ===
The Latin text of the treaty is published in the collection of Venetian documents by Tafel and Thomas. The terms of the treaty were:

1. A truce of five-year duration, on both land and sea, beginning from 4 April 1268, between the Republic of Venice and the 'Empire of Romania'. Venice pledged not to attack Byzantium or any territory subject to it, nor to ally with any power against it—a clear reference to Charles of Anjou—nor to allow any Venetian ships captains or nobles to engage with "other kings, princes, barons or counts" in designs against Byzantine territories, nor would Venice allow Venetian ships to be used to carry troops against the Emperor's territories.
2. All Greek prisoners held at Crete, Modon and Coron, Negroponte, or other places, would be released immediately, and be free to either stay in the same locations or depart to wherever they wished. Palaiologos promised to do the same with any Venetians incarcerated in Byzantine territory, and prohibit the manufacture and sale of weapons for use against the Venetians.
3. Likewise the Emperor pledged "on the True and Venerable Cross according to the customs of the Greeks and the Holy Gospels of God" to observe the same terms, to ensure that no harm would befall the Venetians on Crete or any other of their possessions, and to remove any of his men from Crete (where Byzantine troops had been sent in support of the revolt of the Chortatzes brothers). Likewise Palaiologos pledged to not attack the Venetian possessions of Modon and Coron, and the Venetian islands of the Aegean, and to respect the treaty between Venice and the Prince of Achaea concerning Negroponte.
4. The Venetians would be allowed to settle in Constantinople and any other part of the Empire. This would no longer be in designated quarters provided by the Emperor, but they would be free to rent their own houses, baths, and bakeries on fixed terms, and would have the right to use their own weights and measures and have their own Latin Rite churches. The obligation to pay rent was new, but Venetian merchants would again, as before, be exempt from any taxes in the Empire.
5. The Genoese could remain in the Empire—one of the main departures from the 1265 treaty—on the understanding that both Genoese and Venetians would not engage in mutual hostilities between Abydos on the entrance of the Dardanelles, and the northern entrance to the Bosporus on the Black Sea. If either side broke this arrangement, the Emperor would act as arbiter.
6. If any Venetian were to die on Byzantine territory, then the disposition of his goods should be entrusted to the Venetian rectors or the bailo, or by other Venetians, without interference from the Byzantine authorities.
7. Any Venetian vessel or crew suffering shipwreck would receive any assistance possible from the Byzantine authorities to recover their goods.
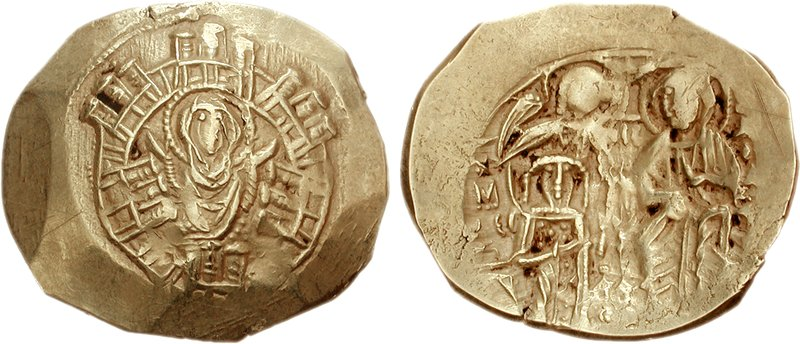
  Hyperpyron of Michael VIII Palaiologos
8. Venetian ships were allowed to purchase grain anywhere in the Empire and export it without restriction, except to lands hostile to the Empire, for as long as its price remained at 50 gold hyperpyra to the 100 modioi; if the price should rise, then export would be allowed only under explicit license by the emperor.
9. In the case of a Venetian accused of killing a Byzantine subject, or another Venetian in Constantinople, the case would be judged by the Emperor, but another offense against a Byzantine, or a murder against another Venetian outside Constantinople, would be judged by a Venetian rector or the bailo.
10. Any damage incurred on Byzantine territories by Venetian corsairs would be restituted by the bailo, who would also be responsible for bringing them to trial. Venice also promised not to provide any assistance to, or even harbour, corsairs acting against the Empire. Acts by Venetians ruling some of the Aegean islands, who were not subject to the Republic, were explicitly exempted from this agreement. No reference was made to Byzantine corsairs in the agreement, despite their active presence across the region.
11. Byzantine merchants would have the right to come to Venice and trade in whatever merchandise they wished, without impediment.

== Aftermath ==
The treaty quickly bore fruit for the Byzantine emperor: in September 1269, Charles of Anjou sent the Achaean knight Erard d'Aunoy and the abbot of Monte Cassino, Bernard Ayglerius, as envoys to Venice to enlist the Republic in his designs against Palaiologos, but the Doge declined, citing the truce. The Venetian stance reflected both their satisfaction, for the time being, with having again secured commercial access in the Byzantine Empire, as well as their disquiet at Charles' policies in the Adriatic, including a recent agreement with Hungary, which had been Venice' traditional rival over control of Dalmatia. In 1272, as the truce neared its expiration, envoys from Charles, Baldwin, and Palaiologos were all present in Venice. The Byzantine ambassadors brought with them 500 Venetian prisoners, apparently seized in Euboea during the campaigns of the Byzantine admiral Alexios Doukas Philanthropenos against the Lombard lords of Negroponte in the previous years; despite the truce between Venice and Byzantium, they had been crewing the Lombards' galleys. Amidst the intense diplomatic manoeuvring, including repeated warnings by Pope Gregory X not to renew the truce, the Doge preferred to cautiously wait out developments; accordingly the truce remained tacitly in force, even if it was not officially renewed. It is possible that the 1268 treaty was also renewed after 1273, whether through annual extensions or a complete new treaty that has not survived. These renewals may have introduced a clause on reparations, which was included in the later 1277 treaty.

Nevertheless, the Venetians had reason to be dissatisfied, as the treaty's provisions regarding the free and safe movement of Venetian merchants and their goods were not scrupulously observed by the Byzantines: in 1278, the Doge submitted more than 300 cases of injury done to Venetian ships, merchants, and goods since 1268, at the hands of the Emperor's subjects; many of them pirates in Imperial employ, but also including soldiers, customs officials and local governors, and even, on one occasion, a sebastokrator (possibly Palaiologos' half-brother Constantine), who had robbed and murdered a Venetian archdeacon captured on a ship off the Morea.

In 1270, an anti-Angevin coalition took power in Genoa, and in 1272 Palaiologos renewed his alliance with the city, now directed against Charles of Anjou. Palaiologos' diplomatic offensive continued with his rapprochement with the Papacy, which alone could either decisively further or thwart Charles' plans, by either supporting his campaign against Constantinople and declaring it a Crusade, or prohibiting it as an attack on a fellow Christian monarch. The terms posed by the Pope were harsh: the Emperor and the Eastern Church would have to confess their errors and accept papal supremacy. Faced with the build-up of Angevin naval forces and alliances, Palaiologos had to concede, and the Union of the Churches was proclaimed at the Second Council of Lyon in 1274. Although the Union proved deeply unpopular among the Byzantine Church and populace, it was a "diplomatic triumph" for Palaiologos, as the Pope recognized him as legitimate emperor of Constantinople and forbade Charles to attack him. Meanwhile, Palaiologos used the opportunity to attack his Greek and Latin rivals in Greece.

Although the Venetian representatives at Lyon had vociferously protested that Venice still claimed its rights in 'Romania', the advantage lay with Palaiologos, and the new Doge, Jacopo Contarini, in 1276 sent envoys to Constantinople to renegotiate the 1268 treaty. This resulted in an agreement concluded between Palaiologos and the Venetian envoy Marco Bembo on 19 March 1277. Notably, this agreement was not phrased as a treaty, but rather as a chrysobull, a deed of grant, from the Emperor to Venice. Given the volatile international situation, however, its duration was limited to two years. After its expiration, it was not renewed, and in 1281, the Venetians in the Treaty of Orvieto entered Charles' anti-Byzantine coalition, with April 1283 as the projected starting date for the expedition against Constantinople. However, Charles' designs were fatally interrupted by the outbreak of the Sicilian Vespers in March 1282 and the consequent War of the Sicilian Vespers. By the terms of the Treaty of Orvieto, a state of war existed between Venice and Byzantium. The outbreak of the Vespers had ruined Venetian chances to recover their privileged position, and for the duration of the state of war their trade with the East was interrupted, much to the advantage of the Genoese. After long negotiations, a final ten-year peace treaty, essentially renewing the 1277 agreement, was concluded in July 1285.
