= Venetian army =

Principal army of Venice

Venetian Army
- Esercito Veneto
- Infantry regimental standard adopted on 26 April 1729 under the reforms of Field Marshal Johann Matthias von der Schulenburg
- Active: 9th Century – 1797
- Country: Republic of Venice
- Type: Army
- Engagements: Byzantine–Norman wars Norwegian Crusade; Venetian Crusade; Fourth Crusade; War of the Castle of Love; War of Saint Sabas; War of Curzola; Byzantine–Ottoman wars Salt War; War of Ferrara; Scaliger War; War of the Straits; Paduan–Venetian border war War of Chioggia; War of Padua; Wars in Lombardy; First Ottoman-Venetian War; Second Ottoman–Venetian War; Third Ottoman–Venetian War; War of Cyprus; War of the Montferrat Succession; Bündner Wirren; War of the Mantuan Succession; Cretan War; Morean War; Second Morean War; War of the First Coalition

Commanders
- Notable commanders: Bartolomeo Colleoni

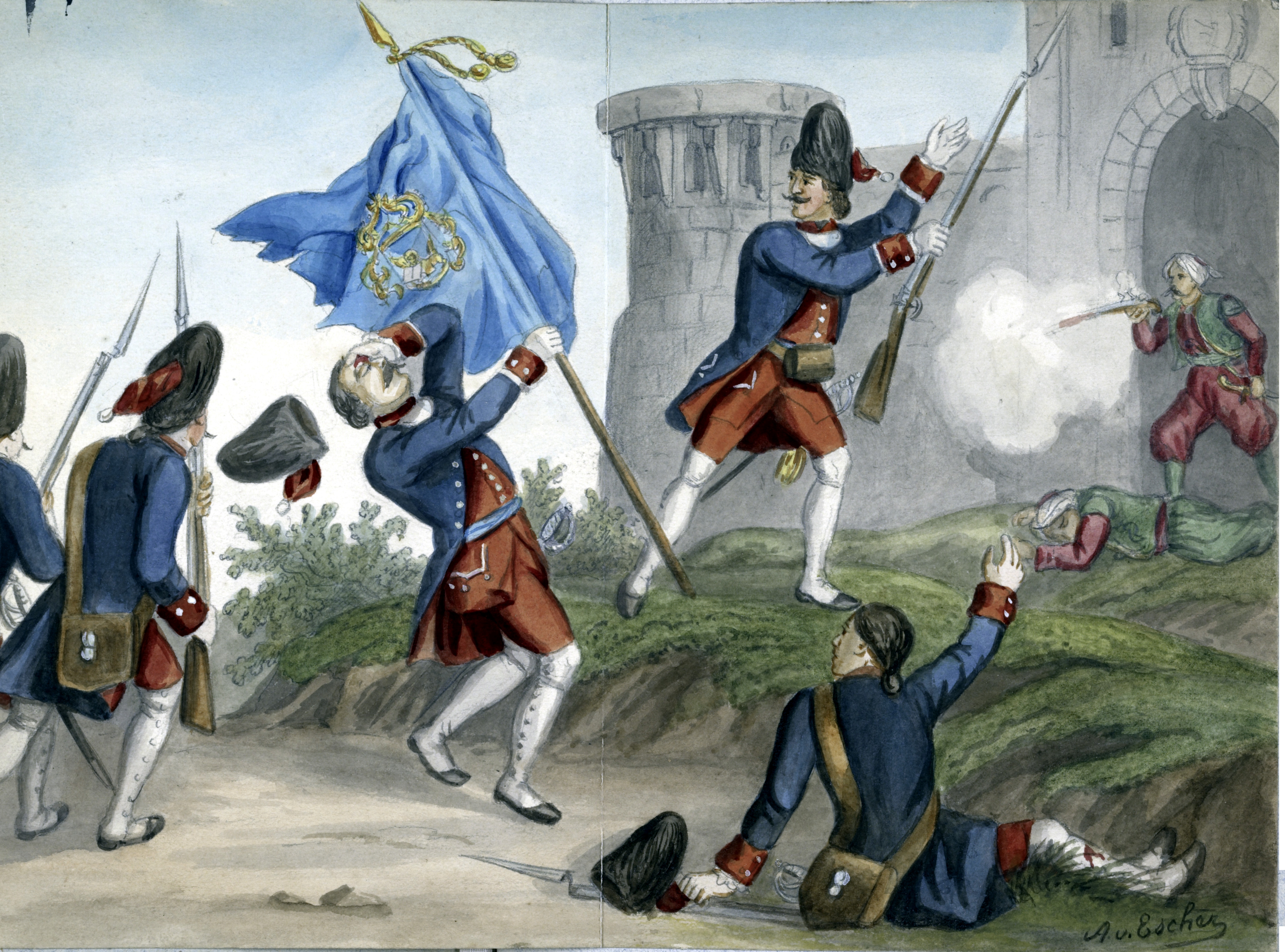
Grenadiers of the Venetian army attacking an Ottoman fort in Dalmatia during the Seventh Ottoman–Venetian War, 1717

The Venetian army (Venetian: Esercito Veneto) was the army of the city-state of Venice, and later of the Republic of Venice and its dominions. During the Republic's early centuries, it was a force comprising an urban militia.

During Venice's imperial age in the Late Middle Ages and the Venetian expansion into mainland Italy (Terraferma) in the 15th century, its conflicts with the Duchy of Milan, the Papacy, and even France and Hungary, required the Venetian government to raise armies of tens of thousands. Given Venice's small population and the Venetians' traditional preoccupation with naval affairs, these armies were mostly composed of mercenaries (such as the Balkan stradioti or the companies of the various condottieri). Venetian noblemen served as commanders in or accompanied these armies as representatives of the Republic, but for most of subsequent Venetian history, their captain-generals were usually distinguished mercenary captains. A further problem for Venice was the need to station permanent garrisons in their overseas colonies. During the Ottoman–Venetian Wars, primacy was usually held by the commanders of the Venetian navy, and the army forces served without distinction as shipborne infantry, in the field, or as garrisons of fortresses. During these conflicts, the Venetian forces also incorporated a number of allied forces from other Italian states.

In the 16th century, the local militias were organized into the cernida system and a small permanent peacetime force of professional soldiers was created, to be augmented with mercenaries in wartime. During the 17th century, the Republic hired foreign regiments—usually from Germany or Switzerland—for service by treaty with foreign princes. By the early 18th century, the regimental system had been firmly established, with the Venetian units separated into italiani (recruited in Italy), oltramontani (Swiss, Germans, and other from 'beyond the mountains'), and oltramarini (recruited from the Republic's overseas possessions in the Balkans). This system lasted, with some changes, until the Fall of the Republic of Venice to Napoleon in 1797.

In the early modern period, the Republic's military strength was well out of proportion with its demographic weight. In the late 16th century, Venice ruled over a population of about 2 million people throughout its empire. In 1571, while preparing for war against the Ottomans, the Republic had 37,000 professional soldiers and 140 galleys (manned by tens of thousands of sailors and oarsmen), excluding urban militias. The Venetian peacetime army strength of 9,000 was able to quadruple in the course of a few months by drawing upon professional hired soldiers and territorial militias simultaneously. These troops generally showed marked technical superiority over their primarily Turkish opponents, as demonstrated in battles such as the 18-month Siege of Famagusta, in which the Venetians inflicted outsized casualties and only were defeated when they exhausted their gunpowder. Like other states of the period, the Republic's military strength peaked during wars, only to quickly go back to peacetime levels due to costs. The level of garrisons stabilized after 1577 at 9,000, with 7,000 infantry and 2,000 cavalry. In 1581 the navy had 146 galleys and 18 galleasses, requiring a third of the Republic's revenue. During the Cretan War (1645-1669), the Republic fought mostly alone against the undivided attention of the Ottoman Empire, and though it lost, managed to keep fighting after losing 62,000 troops in the attrition, while inflicting about 240,000 losses on the Ottoman army and sinking hundreds of Ottoman ships. The cost of the war was ruinous, but the Republic was eventually able to cover it. Victory over the Ottomans in the Morean War further confirmed the Republic's position as a military power well into the late 17th century.

== See also ==
- Military history of the Republic of Venice
- Venetian navy

== Sources ==
- Birtachas, Stathis (2018). "Stradioti, Cappelletti, Compagnie or Milizie Greche: 'Greek' Mounted and Foot Troops in the Venetian State (Fifteenth to Eighteenth Centuries)". In Theotokis, Georgios; Yıldız, Aysel (eds.). A Military History of the Mediterranean Sea: Aspects of War, Diplomacy, and Military Elites. Leiden and Boston: Brill. pp. 325–346. doi:10.1163/9789004362048_017. ISBN 978-90-04-36204-8.
- Concina, Ennio (1972). Le Trionfanti et invittissime Armate Venete: Le Milizie della Serenissima dal XVI al XVIII secolo (in Italian). Venice: Filippi Editore.
- Lenci, Angiolo (2014). "Marignano 1515. L'esercito veneziano del primo Cinquecento". In Haudenschild, Roland (ed.). Marignano 1515-2015. Von der Schlacht zur Neutralität (in Italian). Lenzburg. pp. 191–202. ISBN 978-3856481476.
- Mallett, M. E.; Hale, J. R. (1984). The Military Organisation of a Renaissance State: Venice c. 1400 to 1617. Cambridge University Press. ISBN 978-0-521-24842-6.
- Mugnai, Bruno (2018). The Cretan War, 1645–1671: The Venetian-Ottoman Struggle in the Mediterranean. Warwick: Helion & Company. ISBN 978-1-911628-0-40.
- Prelli, Alberto (2012). Sotto le bandiere di San Marco –Le armate della Serenissima nel '600 (in Italian). Bassano del Grappa: itinera progetti. ISBN 978-88-88542-50-8.
- Prelli, Alberto; Mugnai, Bruno (2016). L'ultima vittoria della Serenissima: 1716 – L'assedio di Corfù (in Italian). Bassano del Grappa: itinera progetti. ISBN 978-88-88542-74-4.
