= Jacopo Contarini =

Doge of Venice from 1275 to 1280

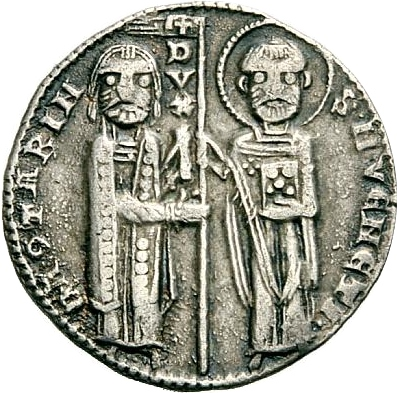
- Grosso of Jacopo Contarini

Doge of Venice
- In office 1275–1280
- Preceded by: Lorenzo Tiepolo
- Succeeded by: Giovanni Dandolo

Personal details
- Born: 1194
- Died: 1280 (Aged 85-86)

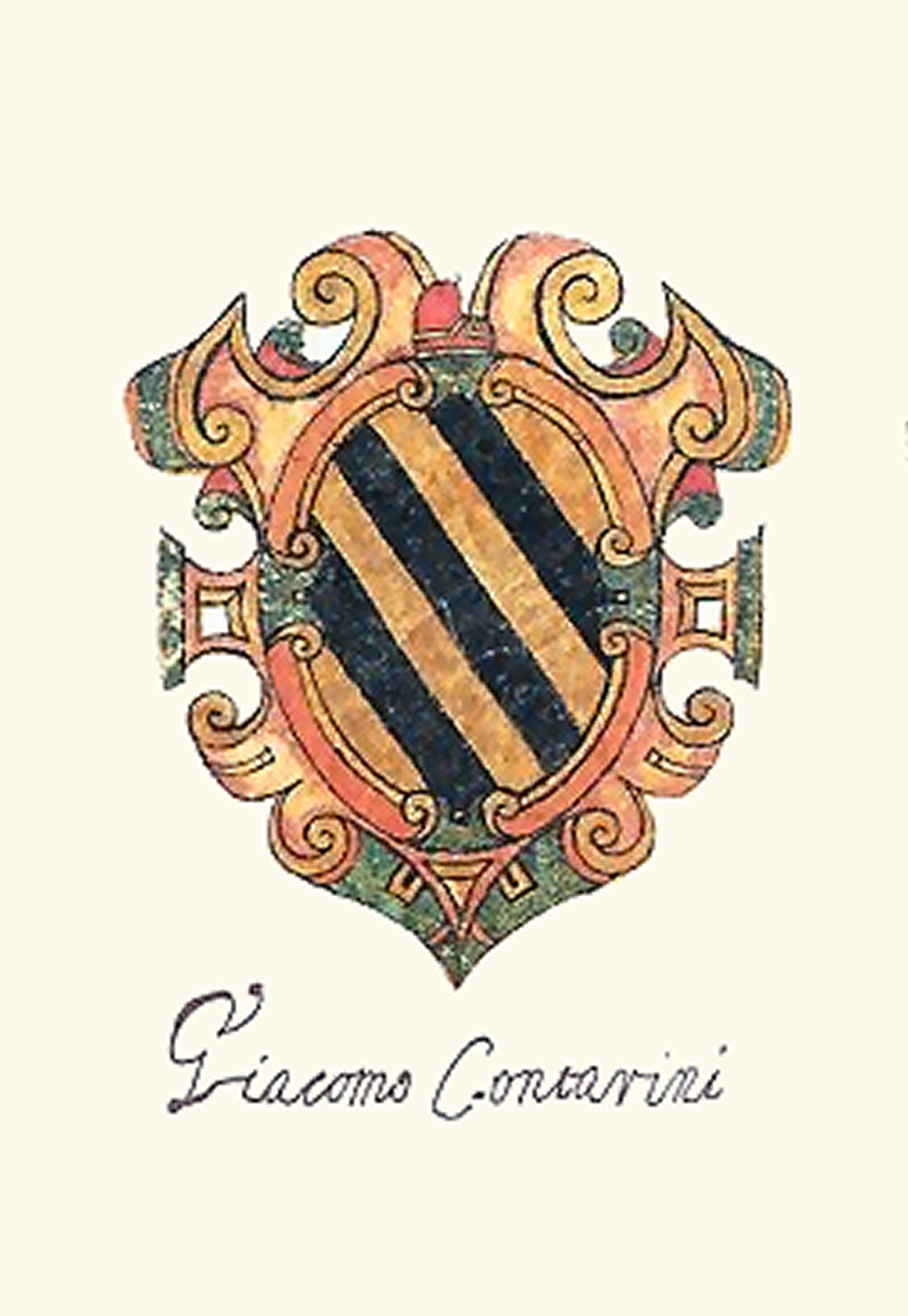
Coat of arms of Jacopo Contarini

Jacopo Contarini (Giacomo) (1193 – 6 April 1280) was the 47th Doge of Venice, from 6 September 1275 until his abdication on 6 March 1280.

In 1265, along with Jacopo Dolfin, Contarini concluded a peace treaty with the Emperor on 18 June 1265, that would remain unratified by Venice.

Although he came from one of the most illustrious Venetian families, Contarini, Jacopo was not considered an influential person and he was probably chosen as a compromise between the two major factions. Being already in his eighties and unable to face the position's challenges—a revolt in Istria and Crete and a war with Ancona—he abdicated as Doge after five years and retired to a monastery, where he died the same year. He was probably buried in the church of Frari. He was married to one Jacobina.

Political offices
Preceded by Lorenzo Tiepolo	Doge of Venice; 1275 – 1280	Succeeded by Giovanni Dandolo
