= Lorenzo Tiepolo =

Doge of Venice from 1268 to 1275

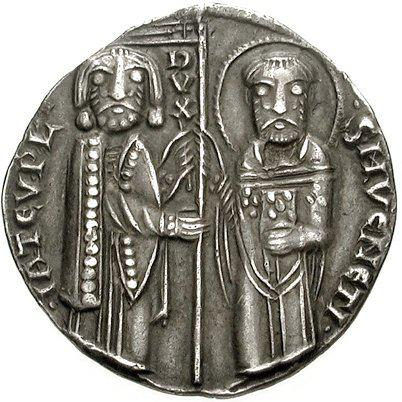
- Grosso of Lorenzo Tiepolo

Doge of Venice
- In office 1268–1275
- Preceded by: Reniero Zeno
- Succeeded by: Jacopo Contarini

Personal details
- Born: Unknown
- Died: 15 August 1275 Venice, Republic of Venice
- Parent(s): Jacopo Tiepolo; Maria Storlato

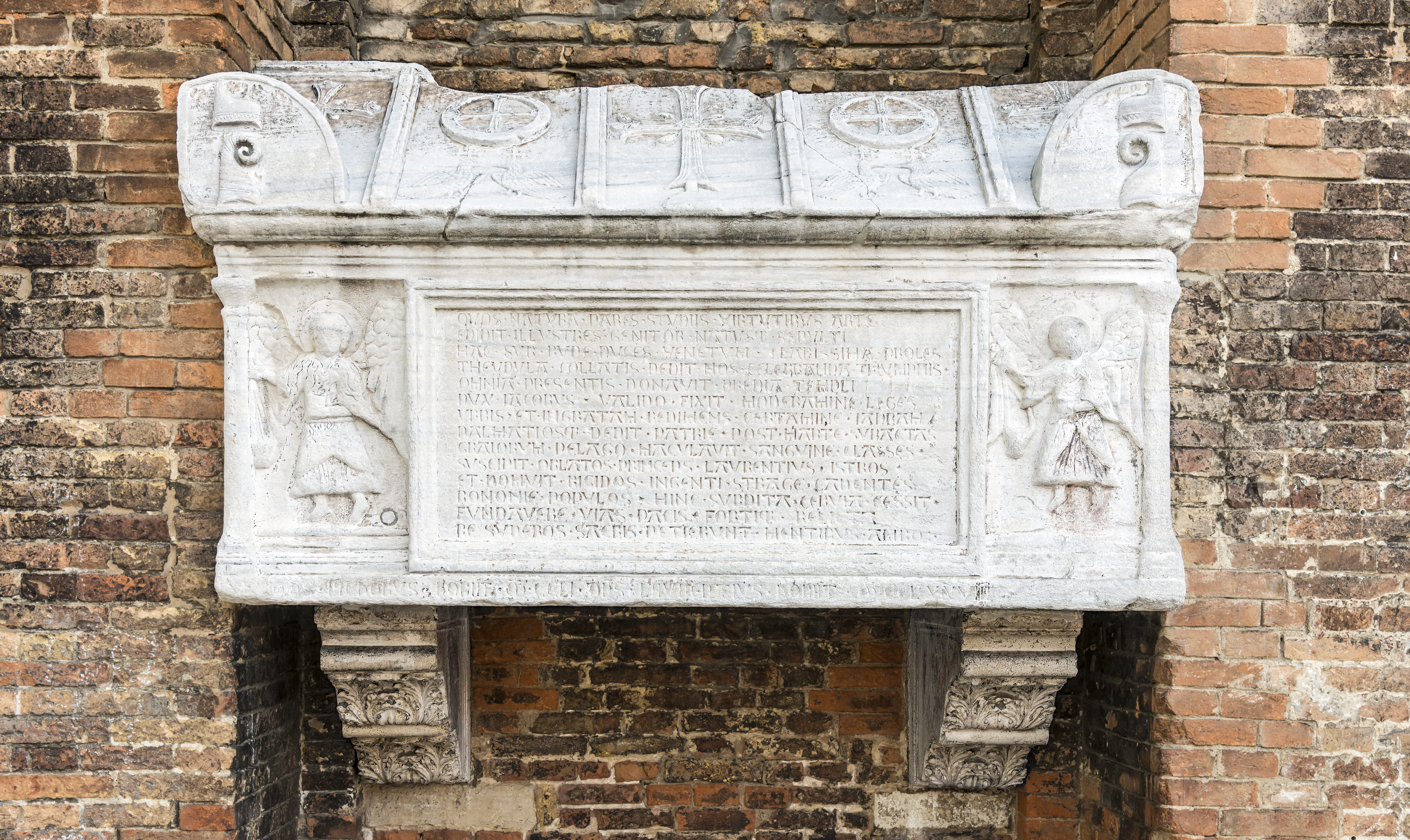
Jacopo and Lorenzo Tiepolo's ark

Lorenzo Tiepolo (died 15 August 1275) was doge of the Republic of Venice from 1268 until his death.

== Biography ==
Born in Venice, Lorenzo Tiepolo was the son of Doge Jacopo Tiepolo. Tiepolo demonstrated skill as a commander when, during the War of Saint Sabas with Genoa, he defeated the Genoese at the Battle of Acre in 1258. He served also as a podestà of Fano.

In 1262, he took part in the peace negotiation between Venice and Prince William of Villehardouin, whose vassal he was for the islands of Skopelos and Skyros, in the aftermath of the War of the Euboeote Succession.

In 1268, after the death of Reniero Zeno, Lorenzo was elected doge on 23 July of that year, with 25 votes out of 41. Although beloved by the population, he attracted the hostility of the Venetian nobility for his nepotism towards his sons. The position of Cancellier Grande ("Great Chancellor") was therefore created to thwart such behaviour.

In 1270, a peace treaty was signed with Genoa at Cremona, confirming the Venetian predominance in the Adriatic Sea; however, in that same year a war broke out between Venice and a league of Italian cities including Bologna, Treviso, Verona, Mantua, Ferrara, Cremona, Recanati, and Ancona due to commercial disputes. After an initial setback in 1271, the Venetians were able to regain the upper hand and the terms of peace were favourable to Venice.

Under his dogado, in 1273, Marco Polo began his journey to China. He did not return until 1295.

Tiepolo died in Venice in 1275 and was buried with his father in the Dominican church of San Zanipolo.

== Family ==
His first wife was, according to conflicting traditions, "either the daughter of the King of Romania or of Bohemund of Brienne, ruler of Rascia". Probably widowed, he married before 1262 his second wife, Marchesina Ghisi, daughter of Geremia Ghisi.

He had two sons from his second marriage, Giacomo and Pietro.

Political offices
Preceded by Reniero Zeno	Doge of Venice; 1268–1275	Succeeded by Jacopo Contarini
