= Tower of Flies =

Fort at the medieval city-port of Acre, Israel

Coordinates: 32°55′7″N 35°4′20″E

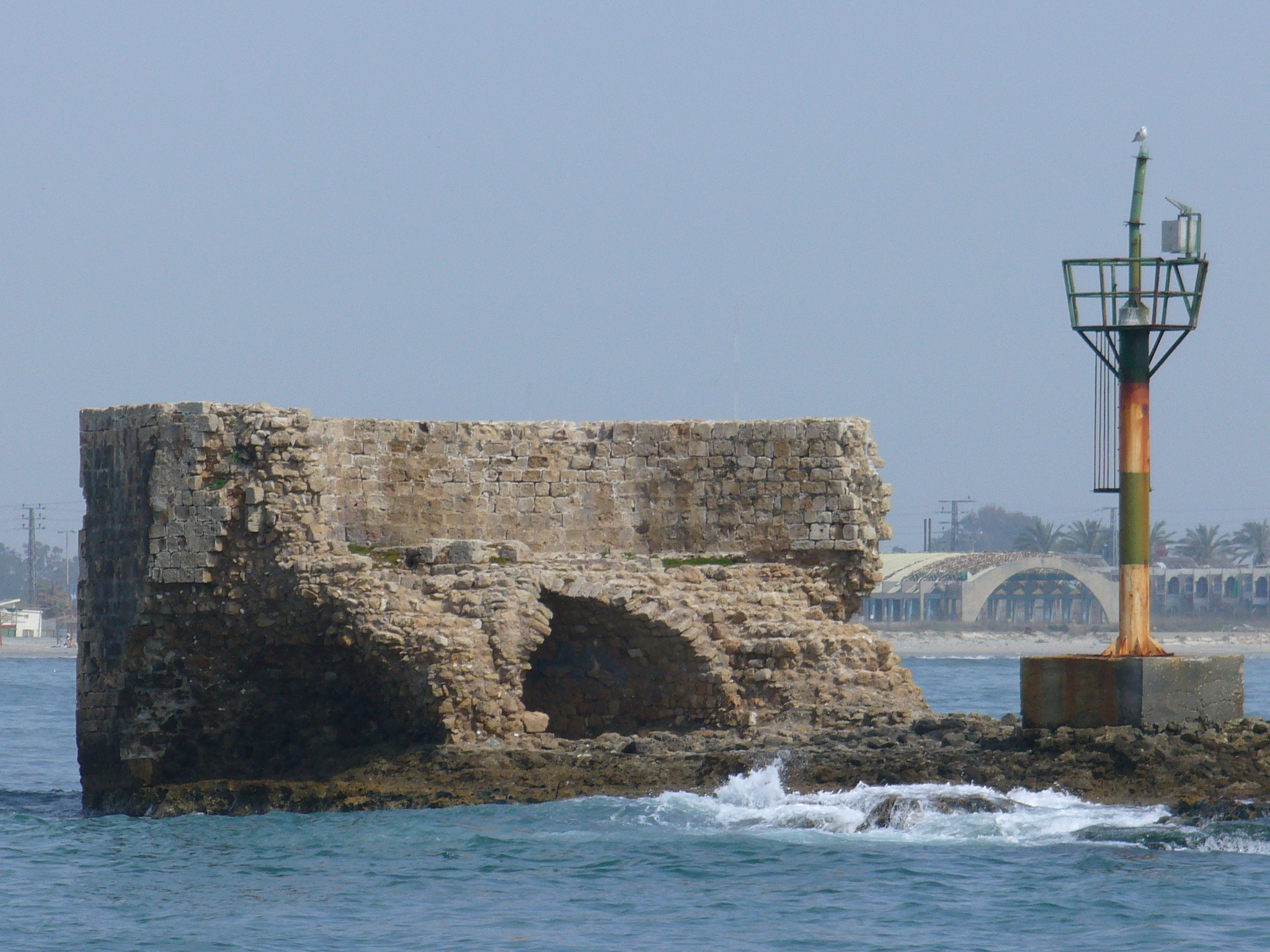
The ruins of the "Tower of Flies" today.

The Tower of Flies (Latin: Turris Muscarum) was a formidable guard tower/fort at the medieval city-port of Acre, Israel, which overlooked the harbour from a small island and protected the city's rich maritime trade. It also served as a lighthouse.

Its precise origins are unknown, but it is an ancient structure, most likely built in Phoenician times. It was the Crusaders of Europe that redeveloped the tower to the height of its prowess during a re-fortification of the ancient port after the city's capture in the First Crusade. The tower was also attached to a giant harbour chain that was strung across the harbour to prevent the entry of ships. The ruins of the tower are still visible today.

== Origin of name ==
The tower gets its peculiar name from the Crusaders who first arrived at Acre; believing that they had arrived at the ancient Bible city of Ekron where one of the major deities was Ba'al-zebub, literally meaning the Lord of the Flies. Since the tower already existed and apparently garbage was frequently left at the site, it was named the Tower of Flies.

== History ==
The ancient watchtower has been a key feature in the city's armour against foreign attacks, particularly at sea. Conrad of Montferrat tried to take the city of Acre during the Third Crusade by attacking the Tower of Flies but adverse winds and rocks below the surface prevented his ship getting close enough.

The tower was also a key piece in the War of St. Sabas, with the warring maritime Genoese and Venetian factions fighting for its control and by extension, control of the harbour. In 1267, Genoa managed to capture the tower and blockade the harbour for twelve days before the Venetians evicted them. The war was settled three years later.

During the times of Jazzar Pasha, the Ottoman ruler of Acre in the late 18th century, a huge chain was used to secure entrance in and out of the harbour. During this era, the tower also had a sinister reputation as a dungeon.
