= Treaty of Nymphaeum (1261) =

Nicaean–Genoese trade and defense treaty

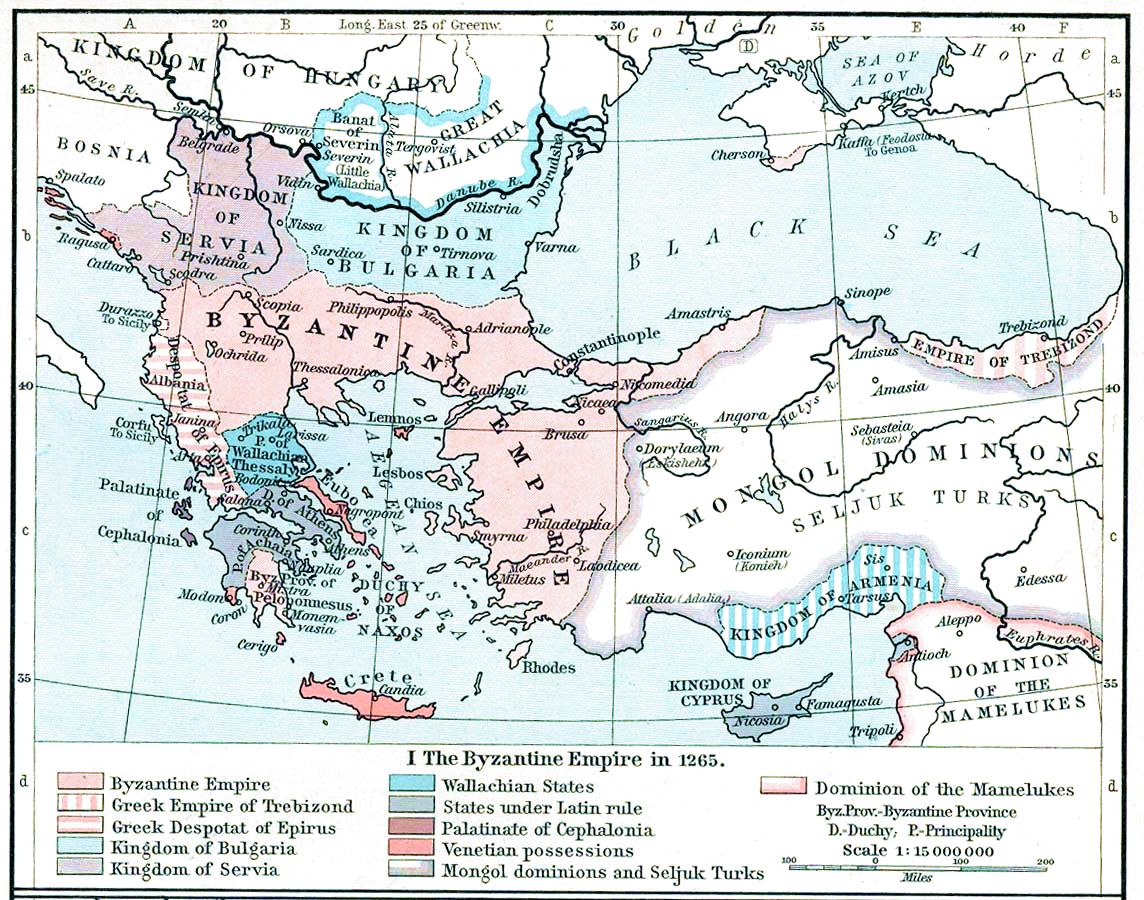
- The restored Byzantine Empire in 1265, shortly after the Treaty of Nymphaeum and the demise of the Latin Empire.
- Signed: 13 March 1261
- Location: Nymphaeum
- Signatories: (Byzantine Empire) Empire of Nicaea; Republic of Genoa

The Treaty of Nymphaeum was a trade and defense pact signed between the Empire of Nicaea and the Republic of Genoa in Nymphaion in March 1261. This treaty would have a major impact on both the restored Byzantine Empire and the Republic of Genoa that would later dictate their histories for several centuries to come.

== Background ==
Following the sack of Constantinople by the Fourth Crusade in 1204, the Empire of Nicaea was established as one of the successor states to the Byzantine Empire. After a violent and chaotic beginning, Nicaea was able to preserve its hold on the territories along the western coast of Asia Minor against the Latin Empire to the north and the Seljuk Turks to the east. After the Treaty of Nymphaeum of 1214, the Nicaean Empire was able to slowly expand its borders at the expense of the Latins and reclaim a good part (but not all) of territory previously under Byzantine control; by the late 1230s, the Latin Empire consisted of little more than just Constantinople itself. In all its history, however, the city had never been taken without the control of the surrounding sea access to the city itself. Around the late 1250s and early 1260s, Venice still maintained a sizable patrol of thirty ships in the Bosporus to keep control of the straits and keep the Nicaeans at bay. The Nicaean fleet – fairly large during this time in their history – was able to take back and exert control over several of the Aegean islands, and were a direct threat to Latin-controlled Constantinople, but still no match against the Venetian fleet which the Latins were allied with. This was clearly shown in the joint Nicaean-Bulgarian siege of Constantinople in 1235, when the blockading Nicaean fleet, of allegedly 100 ships, was defeated by a Venetian force one quarter its size. The failed Nicaean Siege of Constantinople in 1260 also pressed the need further for a fleet on any future attack on Constantinople.

== The treaty ==
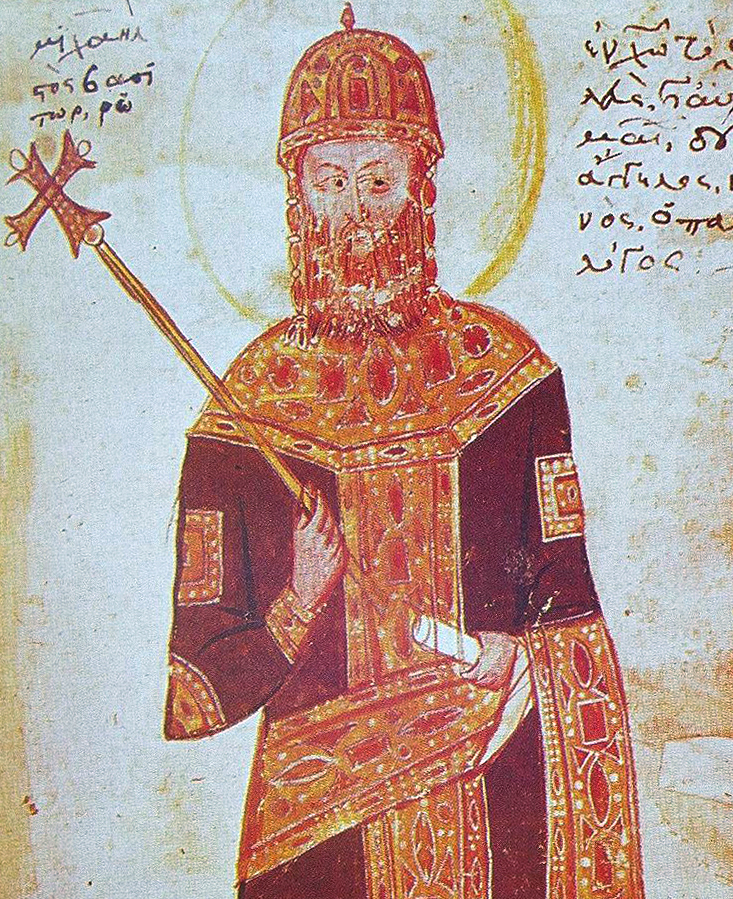
Emperor Michael VIII Palaiologos (r. 1259–1282).

This naval deficiency led the Nicaean emperor, Michael VIII Palaiologos (r. 1259–1282), to seek an alliance with Venice's commercial and naval arch-rival, the Republic of Genoa, which was already engaged in a war with Venice. On March 13, 1261, a trade and defense agreement was signed, whereby Genoa agreed to ally with the Nicaeans in the event of war and to provide a fleet of up to fifty ships during the projected Nicaean siege of Constantinople, while sixteen ships were to be immediately provided. In addition, the treaty stipulated the permission for horses and weapons to be purchased by Nicaea from Genoese territories, and for Genoese subjects to enter Nicaean service. In exchange, the Genoese would receive tax and custom concessions throughout the Byzantine Empire, including their own trading quarter in Pera, on the coast of the Golden Horn opposite Constantinople, as well as other ports within the Byzantine Empire. The Treaty of Nymphaeum was very similar in its objectives as the Byzantine–Venetian Treaty of 1082, in which Venice gained considerable concessions from the Byzantine Empire.

On 28 April Palaiologos added an annex to the treaty, which was sent to Genoa for ratification by three ambassadors: Theodore Kriviziotes, the archdeacon of Hagia Sophia Leo, and Isaac Doukas Mourtzouphlos. The treaty and its annex were ratified at Genoea by the popular assembly on 10 July. Mourtzouphlos died in Genoa during this mission and was buried in the Genoa Cathedral.

== Results ==
Despite this treaty, Constantinople was recaptured in an unforeseen manner by Alexios Strategopoulos on July 25, 1261, without necessitating Genoese assistance. The Treaty of Nymphaeum thus became nearly redundant for the Byzantines, and Michael VIII set about creating a strong "national" navy of his own. However, as Venice and other Catholic powers continued to threaten the Byzantine Empire with invasion, the treaty would remain in force, with minor modifications. For Genoa, the treaty had a major impact as it laid the foundations for their commercial empire in the Near East, especially through the transformation of Galata (the Genoese suburb in Pera across the Golden Horn) into the major commercial hub of the region. However, this would be a direct competition to Venice as this would threaten their trade position within the East as well.

In the long run, and especially after the death of Michael VIII, the Byzantine Empire would become a prisoner to the actions of both Genoa and Venice, as the commercial and naval supremacy that it once enjoyed would be usurped by both powers.

== See also ==
- Byzantine–Venetian treaty of 1268

== Sources ==
- Balard, Michel (2017). "1261. Genova nel mondo: il trattato di Ninfeo". Gênes et la mer - Genova e il mare. Vol. II. Genoa: Società Ligure di Storia Patria. pp. 529–549. ISBN 978-88-97099-42-0.
- Bartusis, Mark C. (1997). The Late Byzantine Army: Arms and Society 1204–1453. Philadelphia, Pennsylvania: University of Pennsylvania Press. ISBN 0-8122-1620-2.
- Ostrogorsky, George (1969). History of the Byzantine State. New Brunswick, New Jersey: Rutgers University Press. ISBN 0-8135-1198-4.
- Nicol, Donald M. (1988). Byzantium and Venice: A Study in Diplomatic and Cultural Relations. Cambridge: Cambridge University Press. ISBN 0-521-34157-4.
- Norwich, John Julius (1997). A Short History of Byzantium. New York, New York: Alfred A. Knoff. ISBN 0-679-45088-2.
- Shepherd, William R. (1911). Historical Atlas. New York, New York: Henry Holt and Company.
