= Battle of Acre (1258) =

Battle of the War of Saint Sabas

- Part of the War of Saint Sabas
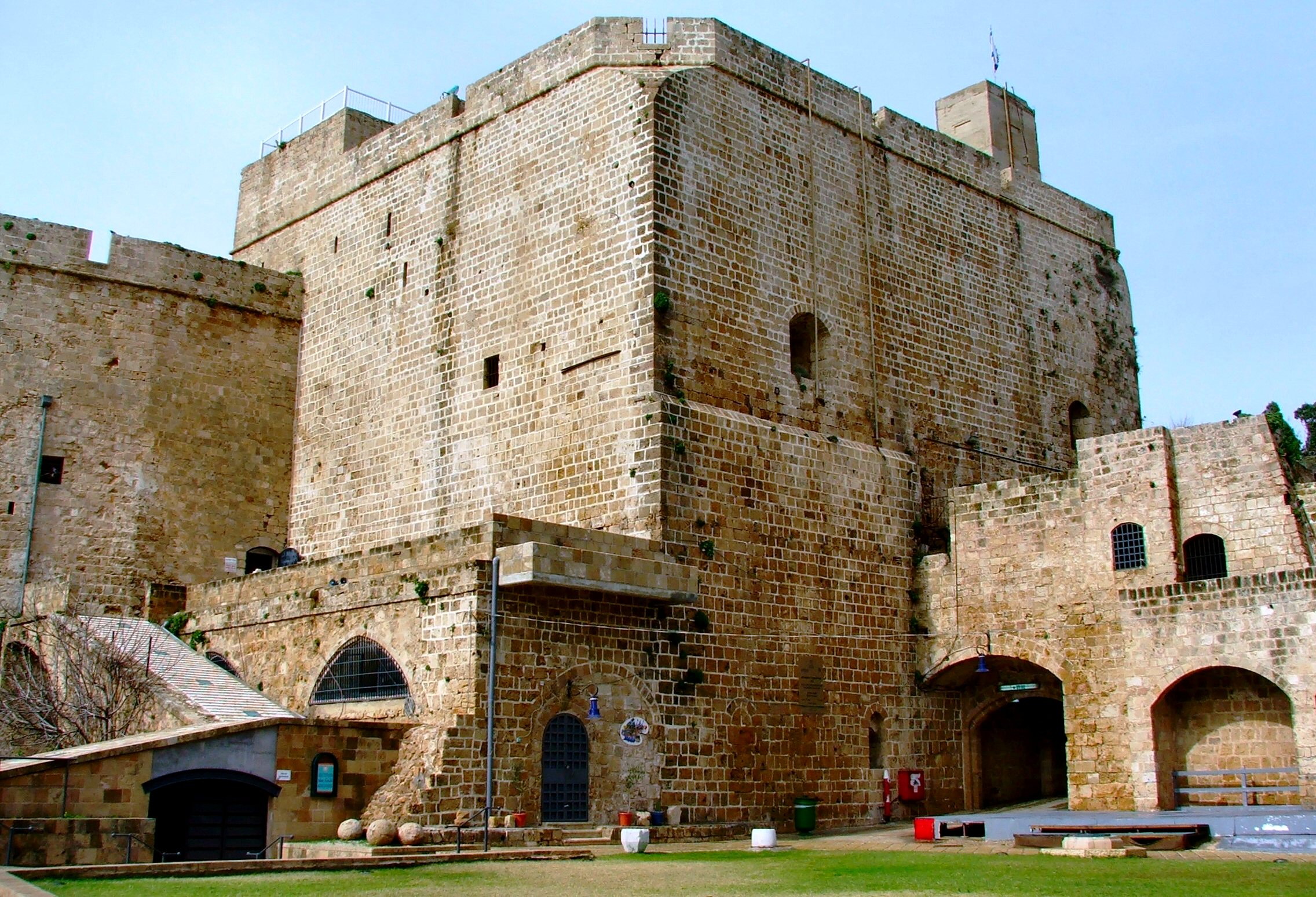
- Akko Tower, Acre
| Date | 25 June 1258 |
| Location | Acre |
| Result | Venetian victory |

Belligerents
| Republic of Venice | Republic of Genoa |

Commanders and leaders
| Lorenzo Tiepolo; Andrea Zeno; Lorenzo Barozzi | Rosso della Turca |

Strength
| 40 galleys, 4 saette, ~10 smaller vessels | 50 galleys, 4 navi |

Casualties and losses
| Unknown | 24 galleys captured, 1,700 men killed or captured |

The Battle of Acre took place in 1258 off the port of Acre, between the fleets of the Republic of Genoa and the Republic of Venice. Mounting tensions between the traders of the two cities had resulted in the outbreak of open warfare between the two ("War of Saint Sabas"), with the Venetians blockading the Genoese in their quarter. Genoa sent an armada under the aged capitano del popolo, Rosso della Turca, to relieve the blockade, and asked the assistance of Philip of Montfort and the Knights Hospitaller for a combined attack from the land side. However, even though the Genoese fleet's arrival took the Venetians by surprise, and their fleet was divided in two by weather as they exited the harbour, della Turca delayed his own attack long enough for the Venetians to get into battle formation. The superior experience and seamanship of the latter resulted in a crushing Venetian victory, with half the Genoese fleet lost. The Genoese abandoned Acre soon after.

== Sources ==
- Marshall, Christopher (1994). Warfare in the Latin East, 1192–1291. Cambridge: Cambridge University Press. ISBN 9780521477420.
- Stanton, Charles D. (2015). Medieval Maritime Warfare. Pen and Sword. ISBN 978-1-4738-5643-1.
