= War of Saint Sabas =

1256–1270 Venetian-Genoese war over Acre

- Part of the Venetian–Genoese Wars
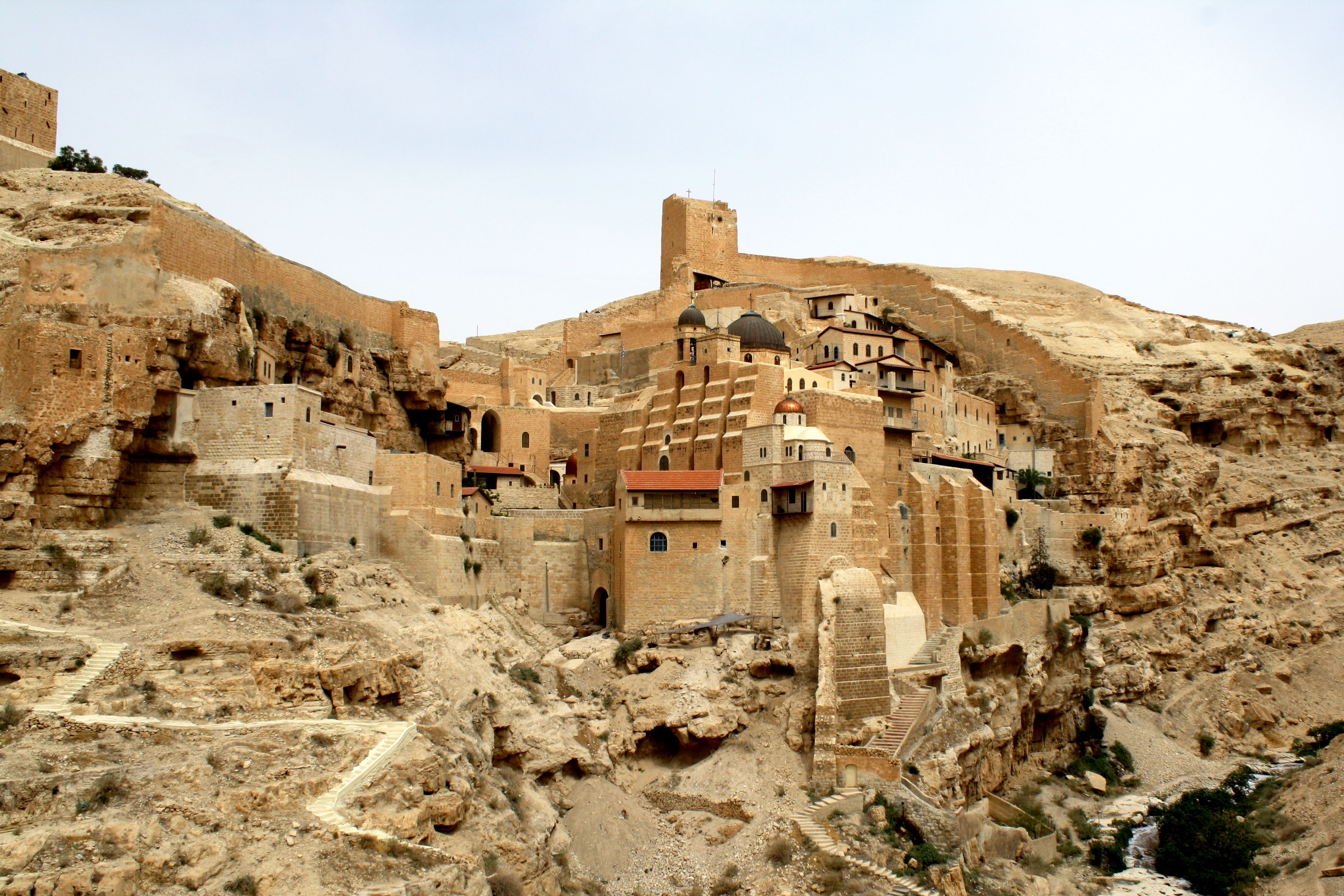
- The Mar Saba monastery, in the Kingdom of Jerusalem
Date	1256–1270
Location	Acre, Levant
Result	Venetian victory; Peace of Cremona

Belligerents
Republic of Venice; Supported: County of Jaffa and Ascalon; Knights Templar	Republic of Genoa; Support: Philip of Monfort; John of Arsuf; Knights Hospitaller; Byzantine Empire

The War of Saint Sabas (1256–1270; Italian: Guerra di San Saba) was a conflict between the rival Italian maritime republics of Genoa (aided by Philip of Montfort, Lord of Tyre, John of Arsuf, and the Knights Hospitaller) and Venice (aided by the Count of Jaffa and Ascalon, John of Ibelin, and the Knights Templar) over control of Acre, in the Kingdom of Jerusalem.

== Cause ==
The war began when the Venetians were evicted from Tyre in 1256. The war grew out of a dispute concerning land in Acre then owned by Mar Saba (the monastery of Saint Sabbas) but claimed by both Genoa and Venice. Initially the Genoese navy had a clear upper hand, but its early successes were abruptly reversed when the Republic of Pisa, a former ally, signed a ten-year pact of military alliance with Venice.

== Siege of Acre, 1257–1258 ==
In 1257 a Venetian admiral, Lorenzo Tiepolo, broke through Acre's harbour chain and destroyed several Genoese ships, conquered the disputed property, and destroyed Saint Sabas' fortifications. However he was unable to expel the Genoese, who were 800 men strong and armed with 50–60 ballistae, from their quarter of the city despite throwing up a blockade; there were also siege engines among the Venetians.

The famed Genoese crossbowmen took part in the fighting in Acre; the life of the Count of Jaffa was spared by a chivalrous Genoese consul who forbade his crossbowman to shoot the Count from his tower. Pisa and Venice hired men to man their galleys in Acre itself during the siege; the average rate of pay of a Pisan- or Venetian-employed sailor on one of their galleys was ten bezants a day and nine a night. The blockade lasted more than a year, perhaps twelve to fourteen months, but because the Hospitaller complex was also near the Genoese quarter, food was brought to them quite simply, even from as far away as Tyre.

In August 1257, the regent of the kingdom, John of Arsuf, who had initially tried to mediate, confirmed a treaty with the Republic of Ancona granting it commercial rights in Acre in return for aid of fifty men-at-arms for two years. Though Ancona was an ally of Genoa and John sought by his treaty to bring the feudatories—most of whom were onside—to support Genoa against Venice, his plan ultimately backfired and John of Ibelin and John II of Beirut "manipulated the complex regency laws" in order to bring the feudatories of the Kingdom of Jerusalem into a position of support for Venice. In this they had the support of the new bailiff, Plaisance of Cyprus, Bohemond VI of Antioch, and the Knights Templar. At this juncture, Philip of Montfort, who had been providing food to the Genoese in Acre, was one of Genoa's few supporters.

Philip was staying about a mile away from Acre, in a place called the New Vineyard (la Vigne Neuve) with "80 men on horses and 300 archer-villeins from his land" (lxxx. homes a chevau et. ccc. archers vilains de sa terre). In June 1258, as per a plan, he marched on Acre and joined up with a band of Hospitallers while a Genoese fleet attacked the city by sea. The Genoese navy, numbering some 48 galleys and four sailing ships armed with siege engines, under Rosso della Turca was quickly overrun by the Venetians and the Genoese had to abandon their quarter and retreat with Philip to Tyre.

== Skirmishing in the 1260s ==
The conflict wore on and by 1261 a fragile peace was in effect, although the Genoese were still out of Acre. Pope Urban IV, who had become worried about the effect of the war in the event of a Mongol attack, a threat that passed without materialising, now organised a council to re-establish order in the kingdom following five years of fighting. The Genoese then approached Michael VIII Palaiologos, Emperor of Nicaea. After the Treaty of Nymphaeum was ratified in 1261, the emperor funded fifty ships to fight the Venetians. After this assault, in 1264, the Venetians returned to Tyre to conquer it, but backed out when Tyre received reinforcements.

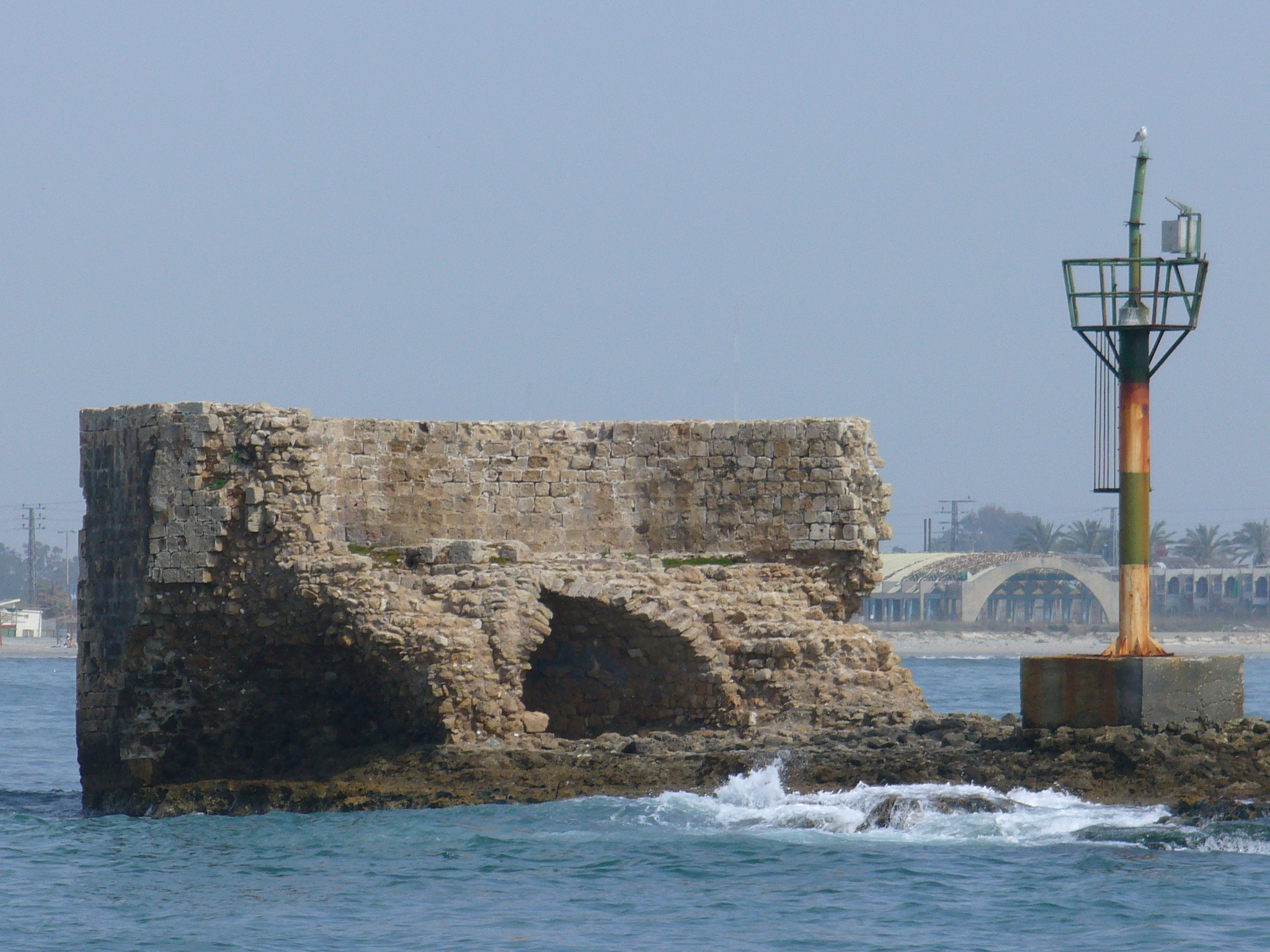
The ruins of the "Tower of Flies" today

During the continuous skirmishing of the 1260s, both sides employed Muslim soldiers, mostly Turcopoles, against their Christian foes. In 1266, the Genoese had made an alliance with the Mamluk sultan Baibars, who was to outfit some troops for an expedition against Acre, but the Genoese' promised fleet never got underway. On 16 August 1267, Genoa managed to capture the Tower of Flies and blockade the harbour of Acre for twelve days before being evicted by a Venetian flotilla. The ongoing warfare between Genoa and Venice had a major negative impact on the Kingdom's ability to withstand external threats to its existence. Save for the religious buildings, most of the fortified and defended edifices in Acre had been destroyed at one point or other (and Acre looked as if it had been ravaged by a Muslim army). According to the Rothelin continuation of William of Tyre's History, 20,000 men in total had lost their lives, a frightful number considering the Crusader states were chronically short on soldiery.

The War of Saint Sabas was settled in 1270 with the Peace of Cremona, ending the hostilities between the Venetians and the Genoese. It was not until 1288 the Genoese regained their quarter in Acre.
