= Peace of Cremona (1270) =

1270 peace treaty between Genoa and Venice

The Peace of Cremona was concluded in 1270 between the Republic of Genoa and the Republic of Venice, ending the War of Saint Sabas. The peace was the result of pressure by France, the Pope, and Sicily, who moved the reluctant warring republics to conclude a five-year truce.

== Sources ==
- Caro, Georg (1895). Genua und die Mächte am Mittelmeer 1257–1311. Ein Beitrag zur Geschichte des XIII. Jahrhunderts. Erster Band [Genoa and the Powers of the Mediterranean 1257–1311. Contribution to the History of the 13th Century. First Volume.] (in German). Halle a. S.: Max Niemeyer. OCLC 457285419.
- Hazlitt, W. Carew (1900). The Venetian Republic: Its Rise, its Growth, and its Fall, 421–1797. Volume I, 421–1422. London: Adam and Charles Black.
