= Querini =

Aristocratic Venetian family

Coat of arms

The Querini family or Quirini was an old Venetian patrician family. They claimed an ancient Roman heritage, but their traceable history goes back to the 11th century. The family divided into many branches.

== Notable members ==
- Ottaviano Querini (fl. 1181–1211), diplomat and administrator
- Romeo Querini (fl. 1209–1241), diplomat and administrator
- Giovanni Querini (d. 1257), archbishop
- Egidio Querini (fl. 1247–1268), diplomat and administrator
- Bartolomeo I Querini (1230–1291), bishop
- Bartolomeo II Querini (d. 1307), bishop
- Marco Querini d. 1310), diplomat
- Giovanni Querini (d. 1333), poet
- Francesco Querini (d. 1372), patriarch
- Andrea Querini (b. 1382), merchant and military leader
- Marco Querini (b. 1399), diplomat
- Guglielmo Querini (1400–1468), politician
- Pietro Querini (fl. 1431–1432), navigator
- Lauro Quirini (1420–1472), humanist
- Vincenzo Querini (1478–1514), diplomat and monk
- Gerolamo Querini (1468–1554), patriarch
- Elisabetta Querini Massolo (d. 1559), friend of Pietro Bembo
- Giacomo Querini (1619–1677), diplomat
- Leonardo Quirini (17th century), poet
- Elisabetta Querini (1628–1709), dogaressa
- Angelo Maria Querini (1680–1755), cardinal
- Angelo Querini (1721–1796), politician
- Andrea Querini Stampalia (1757–1825), admiral
- Marina Querini (1757–1839), socialite
- Alvise Querini (1758–1834), politician
- Giovanni Querini Stampalia (1799–1869), philanthropist
- Francesco Querini (1867–1900), explorer

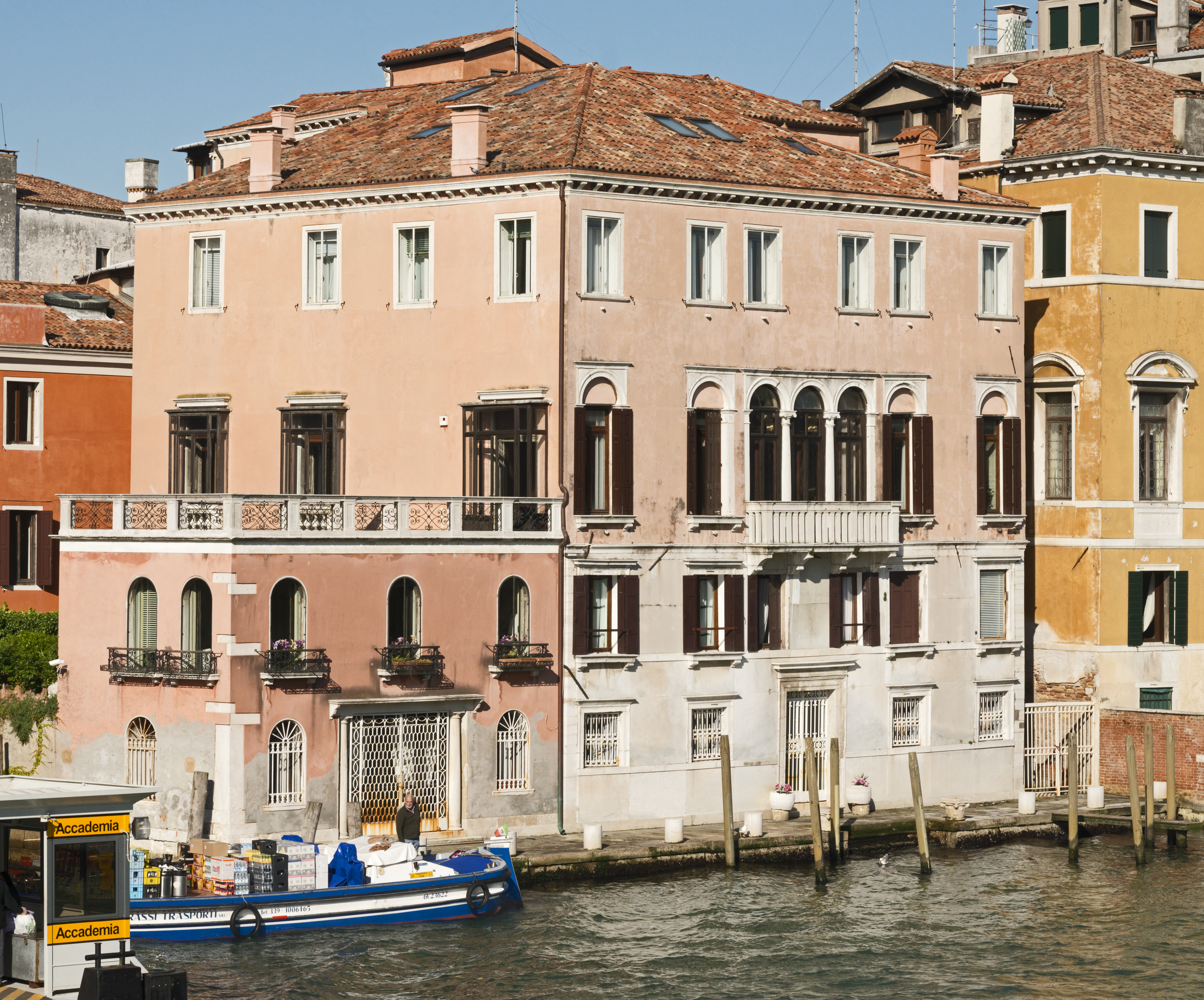
Palazzo Querini Vianello

== Palaces and villas ==
- Palazzo Molin Querini
- Palazzo Querini Benzon
- Palazzo Querini alla Carità
- Palazzo Querini Dubois
- Palazzo Querini Papozze
- Palazzo Querini Stampalia
- Villa Querini (Mestre)
