= List of rulers of Crete =

This is a list of rulers of the island of Crete throughout its history.

== Antiquity ==
Crete was conquered for the Roman Republic by Quintus Caecilius Metellus Creticus in 69 BC and united with the Cyrenaica in the province of Creta et Cyrenaica until 193 AD, when it became a separate province.

=== Roman governors of Creta et Cyrenaica ===
Name	Tenure
Publius Cornelius Lentulus Marcellinus	74 BC
Gnaeus Tremellius Scrofa	51—50 BC
Gaius Clodius Vestalis	during the reign of Augustus
Marcus Titius	during the reign of Augustus
Publius Sulpicius Quirinius	c. 21/20 BC
Fabius	before 13 BC
Quintus Lucanius Proculus	after 12 BC
Publius Sextius Scaeva	7/6 BC
Lucius Plotius Vicinas	2 BC – 7 AD
(Lollius) Palikanus	during the reign of Augustus
Marcus Nonius Balbus	during the reign of Augustus
Scato	during the reign of Augustus
Gaius Rubellius Blandus	during the reign of Augustus
Cesius Cordus	c. AD 21
Publius Octavius	between AD 14 and 29
Occius Flamma	during the reign of Tiberius
Cornelius Lupus	during the reign of Tiberius
Publius Viriasius Naso	during the reign of Tiberius
Celer	during the reign of Tiberius
Augurinus	during the reign of Caligula
Quintus Cassius Gratus	before 53
Caesernius Veiento	c. 46/47
Publius Pomponius Secundus	before 44
Cestius Proculus	before 56
Pedius Blaesus	before 59
Bruttidius Sabinus	1st half 1st century
Lucius Turpilius Dexter	64/65
Titus Atilius Rufus	67
Aulus Minicius Rufus	71/72
Catullus	72/73
Gaius Arinius Modestus	73–75
Silo	during the reign of Vespasian
Aulus Julius Quadratus	84/85
Gaius Pomponius Gallus Didius Rufus	88/89
Sabinus	during the reign of Domitian
? Helvius	during the reign of Domitian
Gnaeus Suillius Rufus	during the reign of Domitian/Trajan
Gaius Memmius ...	98/99
Lucius Elufrius Severus	99/100
Lucius Silius [...]	First century AD
Lucius Aemilius Honoratus	during the reign of Trajan
Titus Vibius Va[rus]	during the reign of Trajan
Q. [...]	118/119
Salvius Carus	134/135
Quintus Caecilius Marcellus Dentilianus	149/150
Quintus Julius Potitus	between 145 and 161
Gaius Claudius Titianus Demostratus	161/162
Pomponius Naevianus	between 165 and 169
Veturius Paccianus	shortly before 168
Quintus Servilius Pudens	after 164
Lucius Saevinus Proculus	c. 173/174
Quintus Caecilius Rufinus	between 160 and 180
Numisius Marcellianus	between 161 and 180
Lucius Sempronius [...]	attested 191/192
Gaius Julius Septimius Castinus	c. 204
Gnaeus Petronius Probatus Junior Justus	between 222 and 235

=== Roman governors of Crete ===
After the reforms of Emperor Diocletian in the 290s, Crete's governor held the rank of consularis.

Name	Tenure
Aglaus	proconsul 286?/293
M. Aur. Buzes	praeses 293/305
Agrianus	c. 304
Fortunatianus Servilius	364–370
Fl. Fursidius Aristides	372/376
Oecumenius Dositheus Asclepiodotus	382–383
Aemilius Quintilius Pyrrhus	after 383
Callinicus	412/413

== Byzantine and Arab periods ==
Crete became part of the East Roman or Byzantine Empire upon the partition of the Roman Empire in 395 AD. It remained in Byzantine hands until it was conquered by Andalusian exiles in the mid-820s and became an emirate, nominally under Abbasid suzerainty. The emirate became a major base for Muslim naval raids along the coasts of the Byzantine Empire, and several attempts at reconquest failed. The Byzantines finally retook the island in 961 under the leadership of Nikephoros Phokas, and held it until 1205.

=== First Byzantine period ===
Proconsul

- Helios (539)

Archon

- Theophanes Lardotyros (c. 764–767)
- John (8th century)
- Leo (8th century)
- Basil (8th century)
- Baasakios (8th/9th century)
- Nicholas (8th/9th century)
- Nicholas (8th/9th century)
- Petronas (first years of the 9th century)
- Constantine (first quarter of the 9th century)

Strategos

- Photeinos (827/828)

=== Emirs of Crete ===
#	Name	Reign
1	Abu Hafs Umar (I) ibn Shuayb ibn Isa al-Ghaliz al-Iqritishi	827/828 – ca. 855
2	Shu'ayb ibn Umar	ca. 855–880
3	Umar (II) ibn Shu'ayb	ca. 880–895
4	Muhammad ibn Shu'ayb al-Zarkun	ca. 895–910
5	Yusuf ibn Umar	ca. 910–915
6	Ali ibn Yusuf	ca. 915–925
7	Ahmad ibn Umar	ca. 925–940
8	Shu'ayb (II) ibn Ahmad	940–943
9	Ali ibn Ahmad	943–949
10	Abd al-Aziz ibn Shu'ayb	949–961

=== Second Byzantine period ===
Strategos

- Michael (10th/11th century)
- Basil (c. 1000)
- Bracheon Philaretos (c. 1028)
- Eumathios (1028)

Doux (katepano)

- Michael Karantenos (1088–1089)
- Karykes (1090–1092)
- Nikephoros Diogenes (before 1094)
- Michael (11th/12th century)
- John Elladas (1118)
- John Straboromanos (mid-12th century)
- Alexios Kontostephanos (1167)
- Constantine Doukas (1183)
- Stephen Kontostephanos (1193)
- Nikephoros Kontostephanos (1197)

== Venetian period, 1212–1669 ==
=== Genoese governors, 1204–1212 ===
Name	Rule
Henry, Count of Malta	1206–1210

=== Dukes of Crete, 1209–1669 ===
The supreme Venetian governor of Crete bore the title of "Duke of Crete" (Italian: duca di Candia, Latin: dux Cretae).

Name	Tenure
Jacopo Tiepolo	1209–1214
Pietro Querini	1216
Domenico Delfino	1216–1217
Paolo Querini	1222
Giovanni Michiel	1227–1228
Marino Storlato	1229–1230
Niccolò Tonisto	1230–1232
Stefano Giustiniani	1236
Jacopo I Barozzi	1244
Albertino Morosini	1255–1257
Giacomo Delfino	1261–1262
Giovanni Velenio	1273–1274
Marino Zeno	1274
Marino Morosini	1274–1276
Pietro Zeno	1276
Marino Gradenigo	1279
Jacopo Dondulo	1281–1283
Albertino Morosini	1290–1293
Michel Vitali	1299
Jacopo II Barozzi	1301
Marino Badoer	1313–1315
Nicolò Zani	1317
Giovanni Morosini	1327–1329
Mario Morosini	1329–1331
Viago Zeno	1333
Andrea Cornaro	1340
Nicolò Priuli	19 November 1340 – 10 February 1341
Petri Miani	26 October 1344 – 24 April 1345
Marco da Molin	24 April 1345 – 19 August 1347
Marco Cornaro	20 August 1347 – 25 November 1348
Marino Grimani	25 November 1348 – 17 September 1350
Pietro Gradenigo	24 September 1350 – 15 August 1352
Marino Morosini	20 September 1352 – 6 September 1355
Goffredo Morosini	6 September 1355 – 20 July 1357
Filippo Orio	30 July 1357 – 6 August 1358
Pietro Badoer	22 August 1358 – 14 July 1360
Leonardo Dandolo	12 October 1360 – 6 February 1362
Marco Gradenigo	1362–1364
Pietro Morosini	1364–1366
Paolo Zuliani	1382
Tommaso Mocenigo	1403–1405
Lodovico Morosini	1407–1409
Egidio Morosini	1417–1418
Andrea Mocenigo	1441–1443
Tommaso Duodo	1443-1445
Andrea Donato	1445-1447
Antonio Diedo	1447-1449
Bernardo Balbi	1450-1453
Benedetto Vitturi	1453-1456
Girardo Dandolo	1456-1459
Leonardo Duodo	1459-1462
Giacomo Barozzi	ca. 1463
Benedetto Gritti	1472–1473
Giovanni Pisani	1477-1479
Giovanni Borgia	1497
Girolamo Donato	1508–1510
Paolantonio Emiliano	1510
Giacomo Cornaro	1528
Giovanni Morosini	ca. 1530
Antonio Morosini	ca. 1530
Antonio Amulio	1536–1538
Giovanni Moro	1538
Ferdinando Vitturi	1539
Alvise Renier	1550
Lodovico Gritti	1552–1554
Zacharia Mocenigo	1559–1563
Marco di Lauro Querini	1570
Nicolò Salamon	1580–1582
Pasqual Cicogna	1585
Giovanni Sagredo	1604
Francesco Morosini	1612–1614
Donato Morosini	1617–1619
Marco Gradenigo	1627–1629
Lazaro Mocenigo	1629–1631
Bernardo Morosini	1644–1646
Giuseppe Morosini	1650–1653
Francesco Morosini	1656
Antonio Barbaro	1667
Girolamo Battagia	1667

== Ottoman period, 1646–1898 ==
=== Valis of Crete ===
Name	Tenure
Çelebi Ismail Pasha	1693–1695
Hasan Pasha	1699/1700
Kalaylikoz Haci Ahmed Pasha	1701–1704
Abdullah Pasha	1704–1713
Hüseyin Pasha	1713
Kara Mehmed Pasha	1713–1718
Silahtar Ibrahim Pasha	1718–1719
Esad Pasha	1719–1720
Cerkes Osman Pasha	1720–1723
Osman Pasha	1723–1724
Hüseyin Pasha	1724–1725
Koca Mehmed Pasha	1725–1726
Osman Pasha	1726–1728
Haci Halil Pasha	1728–1729
Mehmed Pasha	1730–1731
Sahin Mehmed Pasha	1731
Azimzade Ismail Pasha	1731–1732
Haci Halil Pasha (again)	1732–1733
Haci Ali Pasha	1733–1734
Hafiz Ahmed Pasha	1734–1735
Haci Huseyin Pasha	1735–1736
Ismail Pasha	1736–1737
Haci Ivazzade Mehmed Pasha	1737–1740
Hüseyin Pasha	1740–1741
Sari Mehmed Pasha	1742
Haci Ivazzade Mehmed Pasha (again)	1742–1743
Numan Pasha	1743–1745
Ali Pasha	1745–1746
Köprülüzade Ahmed Pasha	1746–1747
Elçi Mustafa Pasha	1747–1750
Mustafa Pasha	1750
Ibrahim Pasha	1750–1751
Numan Pasha	1751–1754
Melek Mehmed Pasha	1754–1755
Mehmed Said Pasha	1755
Ali Pasha	1755–1757
Mehmed Pasha	1757–1758
Kiamil Ahmed Pasha	1758–1764
Tosun Mehmed Pasha	1764–1766
Hüsnü Pasha	1766–1768
Feyzullah Pasha	1768–1769
Tokmakzade Hasan Pasha	1769–1770
Ampra Süleyman Pasha	1771–1773
Cezayirli Gazi Hasan Pasha	1773–1774
Ibrahim Pasha	1774
Dervish Ali Pasha	1774–1776
Kara Ahmed Pasha	1776–1778
Ibrahim Pasha (again)	1778
Mustafa Pasha Hacizade	1778–1779
Mustafa Pasha Mirahor	1779
Mehmed Emin Pasha	1779–1780
Mustafa Pasha Hacizade (again)	1780
Raif Ismail Pasha	1781–1782
Aslan Pasha	1782–1783
Kassupis Seyit Ali Pasha	1783
Abdullah Pasha	1783–1784
Ekmezi Mehmed Pasha	1784–1786
Süleyman Pasha Zorlu	1786–1787
Mehmed Pasha	1787
Mustafa Pasha Hacizade (yet again)	1787
Mehmed Izzet Pasha	1787–1788
Ekmezi Mehmed Pasha (again)	1788–1789
Abdullah Pasha Azamzade	1789
Yusuf Pasha	1789–1790
Hüseyin Pasha	1790–1793
Hasan Pasha	1793–1797
Ferhad Pasha	1797
Said Hafiz Pasha	1797–1798
Mehmed Hakki Pasha	1798–1799
Tahir Pasha	1799–1801
Sami Pasha	1801–1802
Ardinli Mehmed Pasha	1802–1803
Abdullah Dervis Pasha	1803
Mustafa Hasip Pasha	1803–1804
Mehmed Hüsrev Pasha	1804–1805
Vani Mehmed Pasha	1805
Osman Pasha	1805–1806
Said Hafiz Pasha (again)	1806–1807
Kadri Pasha	1807–1808
Marasli Ali Pasha	1808–1809
Kadri Pasha (again)	1809–1810
Hafiz Pasha	1810–1811
Sami Bekir Pasha	1811–1812
Kurd Haci Osman Pasha	1812–1815
Ibrahim Pasha	1815–1816
Vehid Fazil Pasha	1816–1819
Hilmi Ibrahim Pasha	1819–1820
Serif Pasha	1820
Said Lütfullah Pasha	1820–1826
Kara Süleyman Pasha	1826–1829
Mehmed Zehrab Pasha	1829–1830
Mustafa Naili Pasha	1830–1851
Salih Vamik Pasha	1851–1852
Mehmed Emin Pasha	1852–1855
Veliüddin Pasha	1855–1857
Abdürrahman Sami Pasha	1857–1858
Hüseyin Hüsnü Pasha	1858–1859
Ismail Rahmi Pasha	1859–1861
Hekim Ismail Pasha	1861–1866
Mustafa Naili Pasha (again)	1866–1867
Hussein Avni Pasha	1867
Serdar Ekrem Ömer Pasha	1867
Hussein Avni Pasha (again)	1867–1868
Arif Efendi (acting)	1868
Kücük Ömer Fevzi Pasha	1868–1870
Mehmed Rauf Pasha bin Abdi Pasha	1870–1871
Kücük Ömer Fevzi Pasha (again)	1871–1872
Redif Pasha	1872
Safvet Pasha	1872–1873
Mehmed Rauf Pasha bin Abdi Pasha (again)	1873–1874
Hasan Sami	1874–1875
Redif Pasha (again)	1875
Ahmed Muhtar Pasha	1875–1876
Hasan Sami (again)	1876–1877
Konstantinos Adosidis Pasha	1877–1878
Ahmed Muhtar Pasha (again)	1878
Alexander Karatheodori Pasha	27 Nov 1878 – 14 Dec 1878
Ioannis Photiades Pasha	1879–1885
Ioannis Savas Pasha	1885–1887
Kostakis Anthopoulos Pasha	1887–1888
Nikolakis Sartinki Pasha	1888–1889
Hasan Reza Pasha	1889
Shakir Pasha	1889–1890
Ahmed Cevad Pasha	1890–1891
Mahmud Celaleddin Pasha	1891–1894
Turhan Pasha Përmeti	1894–1895
Iskender Pasha	1895–1896
Alexander Karatheodori Pasha (again)	Feb 1896 – Mar 1896
Turhan Pasha Përmeti (again)	12 Mar 1896 – May 1896
Kölemen Abdullah Pasha	May 1896 – Jun 1896
Djordje Berovich Pasha (Georgios Verovits)	28 Jun 1896 – 14 Feb 1897
Musavir Ismail Bey (acting)	Feb 1897 – 4 Nov 1898
Ahmed Cevad Pasha (Ottoman Military Governor)	24 Jul 1897 – 10 Oct 1898
Shakir Pasha (Ottoman Military Governor)	Oct 1898 – Nov 1898

== Modern period, 1898–today ==
=== High Commissioners of the Cretan State ===
Crete became an autonomous state under international protection and nominal Ottoman suzerainty following the Greco-Turkish War of 1897. A High Commissioner of the Great Powers (Ύπατος Αρμοστής) was installed to govern the island. In 1908, the Cretan Assembly unilaterally declared union with Greece, but this was not recognized by Greece until the outbreak of the First Balkan War in October 1912 and internationally until 1913.

#	Name	Picture	Took office	Left office
1	Prince George of Greece and Denmark		21 December 1898	30 September 1906
2	Alexandros Zaimis		1 October 1906	30 September 1911
3	Three-member Commission		30 September 1911	11 October 1912

=== Governors-General of Crete ===
From unification with Greece in 1912 until 1955, Crete as a whole was administered by a government-appointed governor-general (Greek: Γενικός Διοικητής Κρήτης), who supervised the administration of the island's four prefectures (Chania, Heraklion, Lasithi and Rethymno).

#	Name	Picture	Took office	Left office
1	Stefanos Dragoumis		11 October 1912	30 May 1913
2	Georgios Ploumidis		1913	1913
3	Loukas Kanakaris-Roufos		December 1913	April 1915
4	Ioannis Tsirimokos		April 1915	1917
5	Konstantinos Tsaldaris		1921	1922
6	Georgios Karpetopoulos^{§}		9 May 1922	28 August 1922
7	Polychronis Polychronidis		1922	1922
8	Dimitrios Tombazis		1922	1923
9	Periklis Mazarakis		1923	1924
10	Petros Evripaios		1924	1924
11	Nikolaos Paritsis		1924	1925
12	Manousos Koundouros		1925	1926
13	Nikolaos Zouridis		1926	1927
14	Titos Georgiadis		1927	1928
15	Georgios Katechakis^{§}		10 March 1928	22 December 1930
16	Nikolaos Askoutsis^{§}		22 December 1930	25 May 1932
17	Dimitrios Kalitsounakis^{§}		26 May 1932	5 June 1932
18	Michail Katapotis^{§}		19 June 1932	4 November 1932
19	Vasileios Meimarakis^{§}		25 November 1932	16 January 1933
20	Michail Kyrkos^{§}		16 January 1933	
21	Ioannis Moutzouridis^{§}		13 March 1933	25 May 1934
22	Ilias Aposkitis^{§}		25 May 1934	1 June 1935
23	Georgios Frangiadakis^{§}		19 July 1935	10 October 1935
24	Georgios Tsontos^{§}		10 October 1935	30 November 1935
25	Konstantinos Bakopoulos^{§}		7 December 1935	14 March 1936
26	Panagiotis Sfakianakis^{§}		18 May 1936	1941
27	Emmanouil Louladakis^{§}		1941	26 January 1943
28	Ioannis Passadakis^{§}		26 January 1943	10 October 1944
29	Agathangelos Xirouchakis		1944	1944
30	Nikolaos Papadakis		1944	1945
31	Manousos Voloudakis^{§}		29 January 1945	4 April 1946
32	Dionysios Voultsos^{§}		8 May 1946	4 November 1946
33	Emmanouil Papadogiannis^{§}		4 November 1946	24 January 1947
34	Evangelos Daskalakis^{§}		31 January 1947	17 February 1947
35	Christos Tzifakis		1947	1947
36	Emmanouil Baklatzis		1947	1948
37	Anastasios Hobitis		1948	1948
38	Polychronis Polychronidis		1948	1950
39	Nikolaos Krasadakis		1950	
40	Stylianos Koundouros			
41	Ioannis Konotiakis			1955

Notes: ^{§} denotes a person bearing cabinet rank as Minister General-Governor of Crete (Υπουργός Γενικός Διοικητής Κρήτης) or Vice-Minister General-Governor of Crete (Υφυπουργός Γενικός Διοικητής Κρήτης).

=== Regional governors of Crete ===
With the establishment of the region of Crete (Περιφέρεια Κρήτης) in 1986, Crete became again an administrative entity. Until 2011, the regional governors (περιφερειάρχες) were government-appointed, but in accordance to the Kallikratis reform they were replaced with elected officials.

==== Elected governors ====
#	Name	Picture	Took office	Left office
1	Stavros Arnaoutakis		1 January 2011	incumbent

== Sources ==
- Jacoby, David (2006). "The Venetian Government and Administration in Latin Constantinople, 1204–1261: A State within a State". In Gherardo Ortalli; Giorgio Ravegnani; Peter Schreiner (eds.). Quarta Crociata. Venezia - Bisanzio - Impero latino. Atti delle giornate di studio. Venezia, 4-8 maggio 2004. Venice: Istituto veneto di scienze, lettere ed arti. pp. 19–79. ISBN 978-8-8881-4374-3.
