= Barozzi =

Aristocratic Venetian family

Barozzi Barocci Barocius
- Family
- Origin: Republic of Venice
- Estates: islands of Santorini and Thirassia

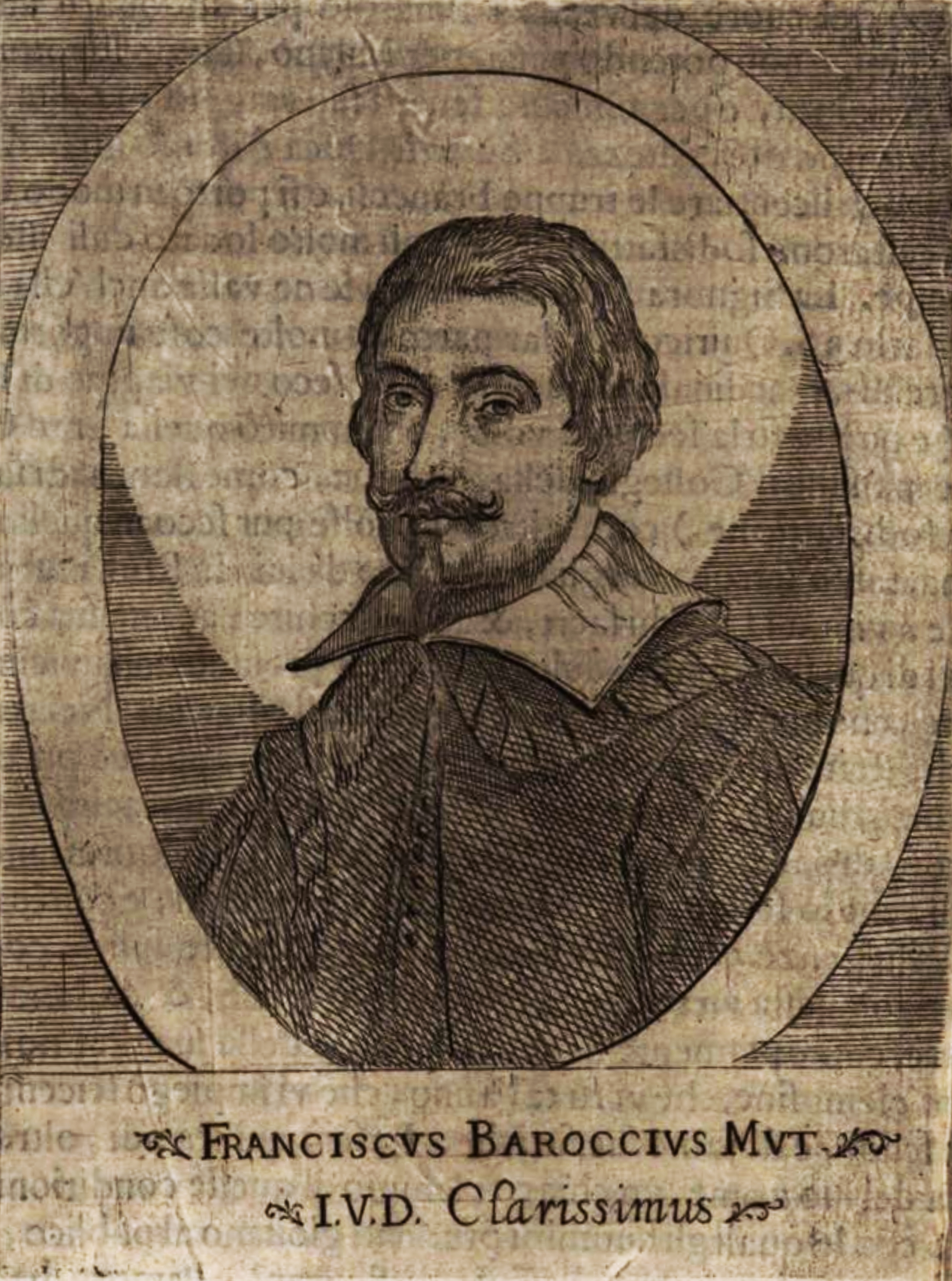
Francesco Barozzi (1537–1604), cosmographer and mathematician

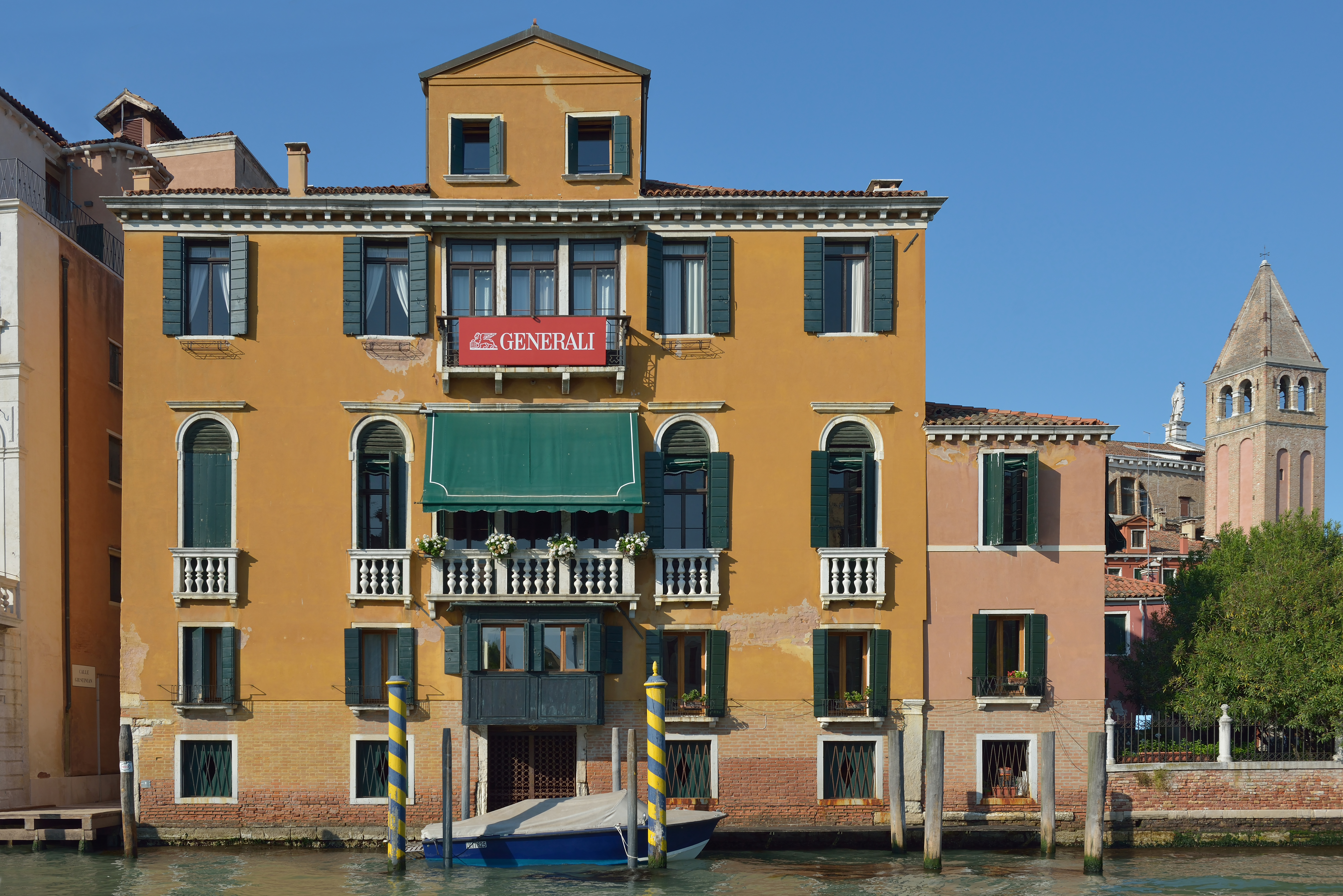
Palazzo Civran Badoer Barozzi, on the Grand Canal of Venice

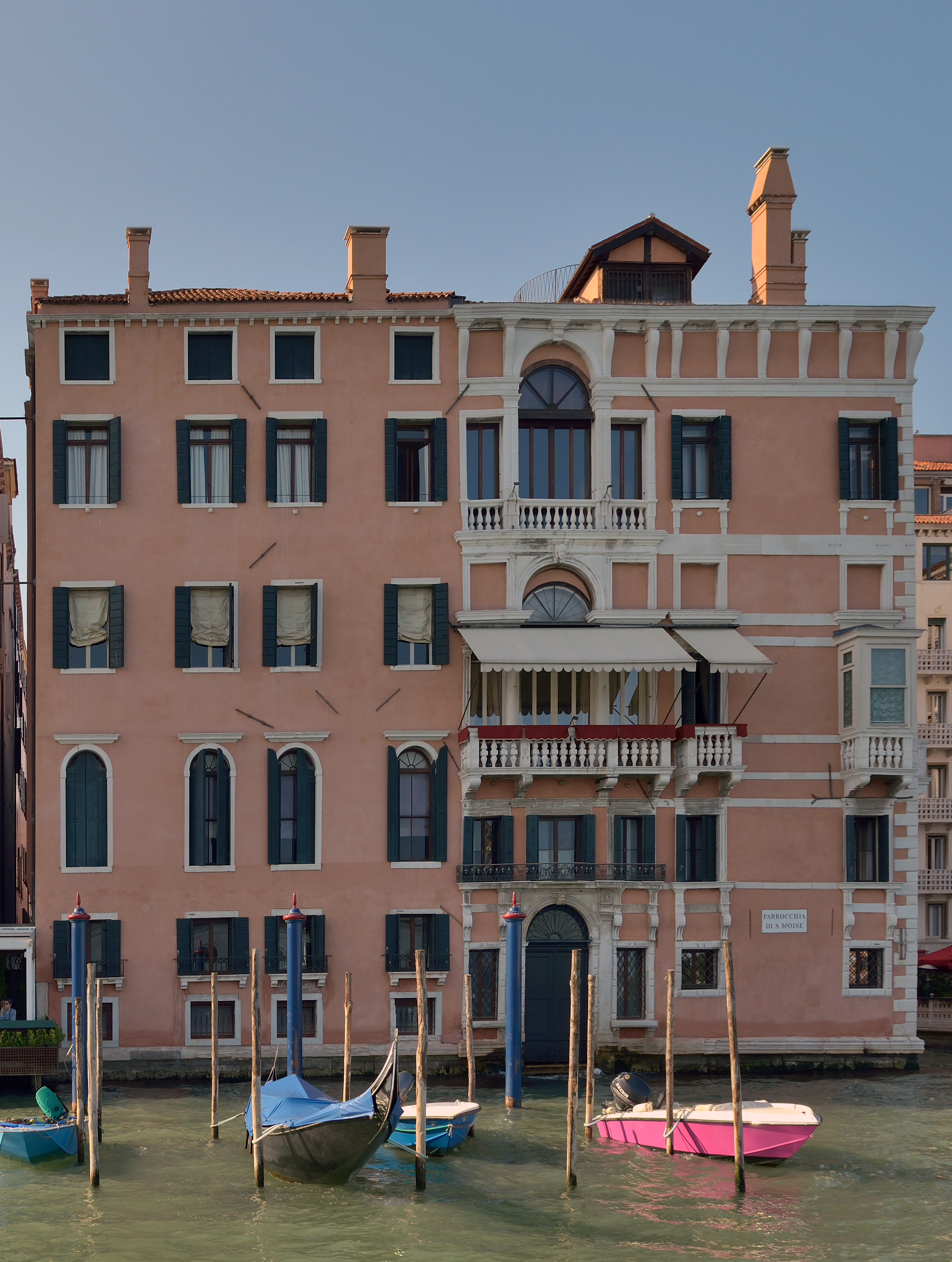
Palazzo Barozzi Emo Treves de Bonfili, on the Grand Canal of Venice

The House of Barozzi was an aristocratic Venetian family that belong to the Venetian nobility. Members of the family became sailors, clerics and men of learning. They were lords of Santorini and Thirassia, and held military fiefs on the island of Crete. Members of the family were involved in the Tiepolo conspiracy against the Doge of Venice in 1310.

== Notable members ==
- Pietro Barozzi, who in 1192 led a Venetian naval expedition against the Republic of Pisa
- Andrea Barozzi, his brother, who sailed with the Venetian contingent led by the Doge Enrico Dandolo in the Fourth Crusade
- Benedetto, Marino and Pancrazio Barozzi, who obtained military fiefs in the Venetian colony of Candia on the island of Crete
- Angelo Barozzi (died 1238), patriarch of Grado (now in Friuli-Venezia Giulia) from 1207 until 1237
- Iacopo Barozzi (died circa 1245), duke of Candia 1244–1245, who – according to tradition – in the aftermath of the sack of Constantinople in 1204 conquered the islands of Santorini and Thirassia; no historical document confirms the story, and the Barozzi family may not have reached the islands until the fourteenth century
- Andrea Barozzi (died after 1278), son of Iacopo, bailo of Negroponte 1258-59 and lord of Santorini from 1245, who led a fleet of forty-seven galleys in a failed attack on the city of Tyre, which at that time was allied with the Republic of Genoa
- Iacopo II Barozzi (died 1308), son of Andrea, bailo of Negroponte 1295-97, duke of Candia 1301-03 and titular lord of Santorini, who reconquered the island, which had been lost to the Byzantines in about 1280, but came into conflict with the Duke William I Sanudo who also claimed the island
- Andrea II Barozzi (died 1334), son of Iacopo and lord of Santorini from 1308
- Francesco Barozzi (died 1471) Bishop of Treviso (1466–1471)
- Giovanni Barozzi (circa 1420 – 1466), bishop of Bergamo from 1449, patriarch of Venice from 1465
- Pietro Barozzi (1441–1507), bishop of Belluno from 1471 and of Padua from 1487
- Elena Barozzi, famous beauty painted by Titian and Vasari, and mistress of Lorenzino de' Medici
- Francesco Barozzi (1537–1604), cosmographer and mathematician, whose collection of ancient manuscripts is now the Codex Baroccianus of the Bodleian Library
- Iacopo Barozzi (1562 – before 1617), his nephew, who catalogued and added to that collection.
