= Agathangelus =

Agathangelus is the Latinized form of the Greek name Agathangelos (Greek: Αγαθάγγελος).

Agathangelus or Agathangelos is the name of:

- Agathangelus of Rome (died 312), Christian martyr
- Agathangelos (c. 5th century CE), possibly a pseudonym, the biographer of Gregory the Illuminator
- Agathangelus of Constantinople (1769–1832), Patriarch of Constantinople
- Agathangelos, a fictional 13th-century monk to whom prophecies were attributed by Theoklitos Polyeidis (1698–1759)
- Agathangelos Xirouchakis (1872–1958), Greek Orthodox cleric and historian
- Agathangelos Tsiripidis (born 1963), Greek boxer
