= Battle of Constantinople =

Battle of Constantinople may refer to one of the following battles fought at or near Constantinople:

- Battle of Constantinople (378), Gothic attack on the city
- Battle of Constantinople (922), between the Byzantines and the Bulgarians
- Battle of Constantinople (1147), between the Byzantines and the Second Crusade
- Battle of Constantinople (1241), naval clash between the Nicaeans and the Venetians
- Raid on Constantinople (1616) by the Spanish

== See also ==
- Siege of Constantinople
