= Tonisto family =

Venetian noble family

- Venetian nobility
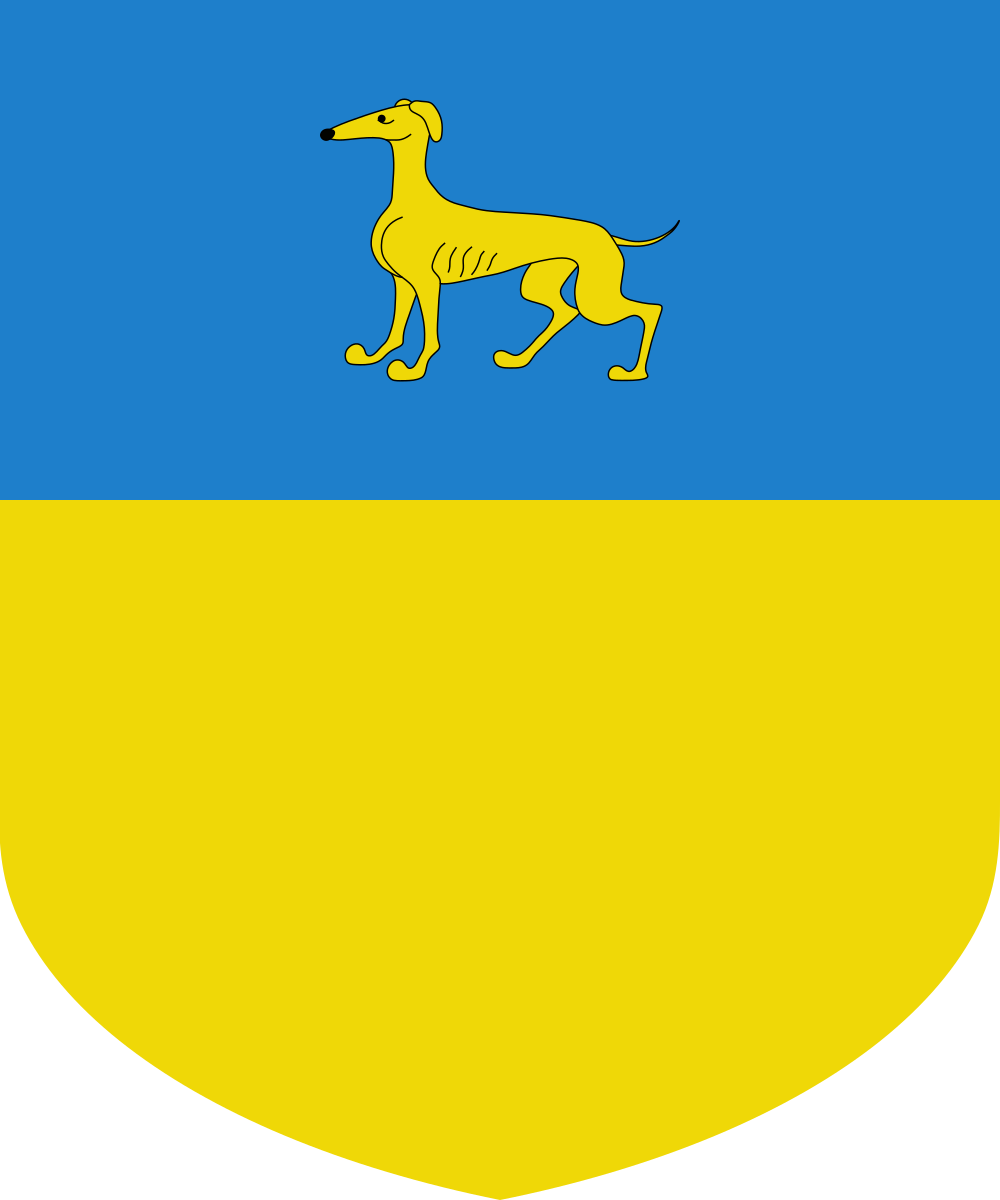
- Country: Republic of Venice
- Titles: Patrician (Patrizio veneto)
- Dissolution: 1523

The House of Tonisto was a Venetian noble family, which reached its peak in the first half of the 13th century.

== History ==
According to the tradition, the family originated from Tunis or Constantinople. They were among the early families who settled the Venetian lagoon. It is possible that they built the San Tomà church, of which they became patrons.

The most illustrious member of the family was Niccolò, who lived in the first half of the 13th century. He is first referred to as podestà of Capo d'Istria (present-day Koper, Slovenia) in 1222. He served as bailo in Acre in 1227. He was Duke of Crete from 1230 to 1232, then podestà of Verona in 1233. He functioned as podestà of Ragusa (present-day Dubrovnik, Croatia) between 1238 and 1240.

The Tonistos were added to the hereditary families of the Great Council of Venice, during the constitutional reforms of the Serrata del Maggior Consiglio in 1298. Nevertheless, the family lost its influence by the end of the 13th century. A member of the family, Marco was a canon at St Mark's Basilica in 1291. He was a titular bishop in Lesser Armenia in 1334. One Nicholas was podestà of Chioggia until his death in 1316. The family became extinct in 1523.

== Activity in Hungary ==
Three brothers of the family – Niccolò (Nicola), Gianni (Ganinus, Gyamus or Ganus) and Marco (Mark) – escorted the pretender Andrew the Venetian to the Kingdom of Hungary in early 1290. They belonged to the household of Andrew, who ascended the Hungarian throne in the same year. Earlier Hungarian historiography incorrectly referred to them as the Torusto brothers based on a misinterpretation made by 18th-century scholar Daniele Farlati.

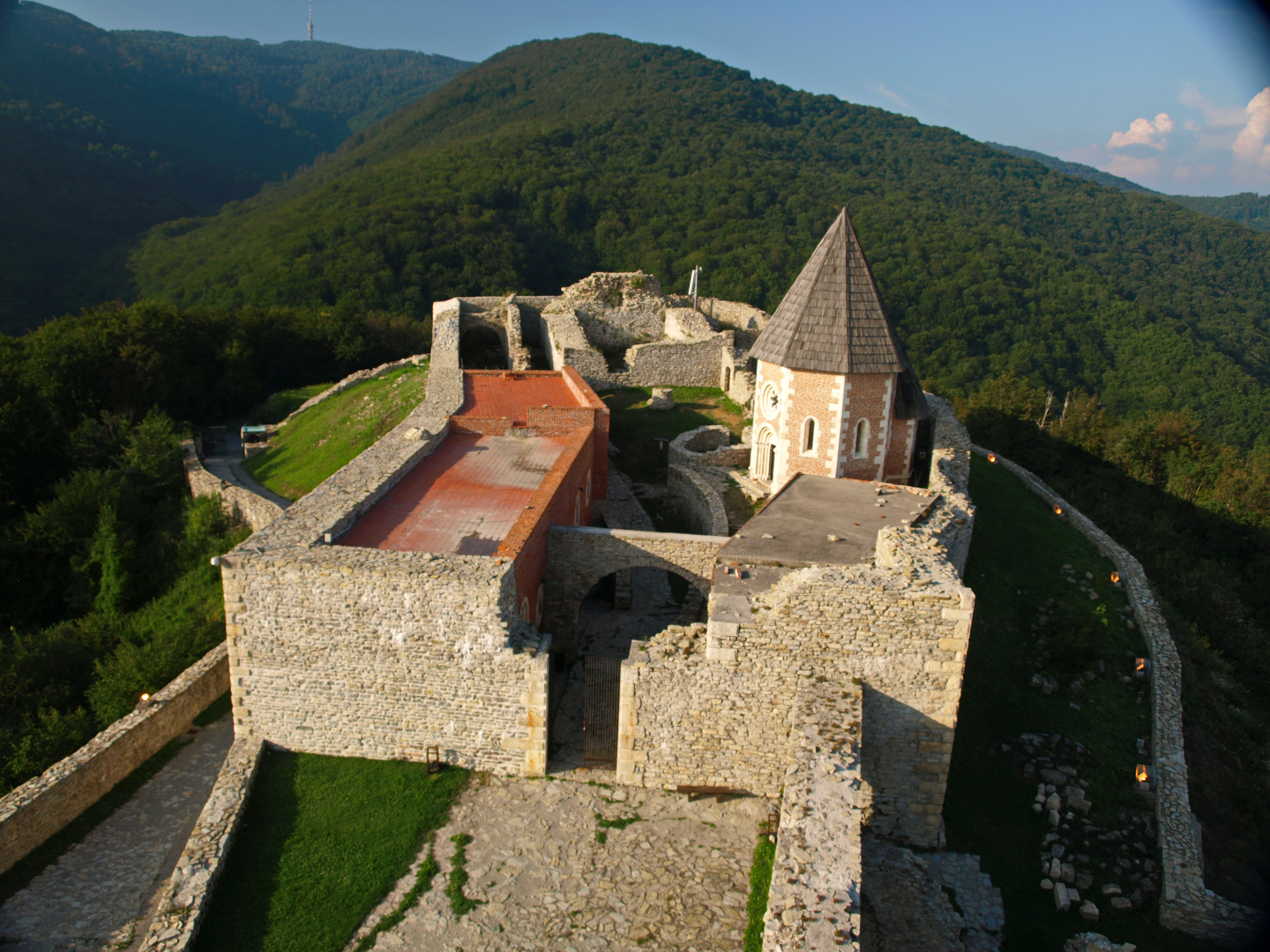
The fort Medvedgrad near Zagreb in Croatia

Sometime after 1291, Andrew III appointed Niccolò as the castellan of Medvedgrad (Medvevár) in Zagreb County, Slavonia. He and his brother Gianni were involved in a series of conflicts with the local burghers of Zagreb. In early 1295, John, Bishop of Zagreb mediated to settle the dispute between them. Niccolò died sometime after 1295, he was succeeded as castellan by Gianni, who was also appointed ispán of the Zagreb royal chamber sometime between 1296 and 1298. Andrew III ordered that the guard of the castle be financed from the income of the chamber. According to a charter from 1328, Gianni was murdered sometime later, around 1299. He was succeeded as castellan by Marco, who was also a canon of the cathedral chapter of Zagreb. Soon, in May 1300 at the latest, Marco handed over Medvedgrad to the powerful Babonić family in exchange for a hefty sum. Later, Bishop Augustin Kažotić protested against this act.

Marco left Hungary following the death of Andrew III in 1301, and it is possible that he is identical with the aforementioned titular bishop. Another canon of Zagreb, Jacopo Vendelino was a confidant of the Tonisto brothers. He obtained a benefice at the St Mark's Basilica in Venice and was also vicar of San Tomà church in 1308.

== Sources ==
- Bácsatyai, Dániel (2023). "A széplelkű kamaraispán és más szerencselovagok. III. András olaszai [The Belletrist Chamber Ispán and other Adventurers. The Italians of Andrew III]". Századok (in Hungarian). 157 (6). Magyar Történelmi Társulat: 1171–1193. ISSN 0039-8098.
- Weisz, Boglárka (2010). "Kamaraispánok az Árpád-korban [Ispáns of Chamber in the Age of Árpáds]". Turul (in Hungarian). 83 (3). Magyar Heraldikai és Genealógiai Társaság: 79–87. ISSN 1216-7258.
- Zsoldos, Attila (2011). Magyarország világi archontológiája, 1000–1301 [Secular Archontology of Hungary, 1000–1301] (in Hungarian). História, MTA Történettudományi Intézete. ISBN 978-963-9627-38-3.
