= Niccolò Tonisto =

Venetian nobleman and duke of Crete

Niccolo Tonisto

7th Duke of Crete
- In office 1230–1232
- Preceded by: Marino Storlato
- Succeeded by: Stefano Giustiniani

Niccolò Tonisto (fl. 1222–1240) was a 13th-century Venetian nobleman and administrator. He is the most illustrious member of the Tonisto patrician family.

== Life ==
Niccolò Tonisto is first referred to as podestà of Capo d'Istria (present-day Koper, Slovenia) in 1222. He served as bailo in Acre in 1227. He was Duke of Crete from 1230 to 1232, then podestà of Verona in 1233. He functioned as podestà of Ragusa (present-day Dubrovnik, Croatia) between 1238 and 1240.

== Sources ==
- Bácsatyai, Dániel (2023). "A széplelkű kamaraispán és más szerencselovagok. III. András olaszai [The Belletrist Chamber Ispán and other Adventurers. The Italians of Andrew III]". Századok (in Hungarian). 157 (6). Magyar Történelmi Társulat: 1171–1193. ISSN 0039-8098.
