= Bartolomeo I Querini =

- Born: ca. 1230; Venice
- Died: Between February and March of 1291

Bartolomeo I Querini (ca. 1230–between February and March 1291) was an Italian Catholic bishop.

== Biography ==
Bartolomeo I Querini was born in Venice around 1230 to Romeo Querini and Richelda, who may have also been a part of the Querini family.

The Querini family—active in trade since the 12th century—was experiencing a rapid social ascent. The first member of the Querini family to enter the clergy was his uncle, Leonardo, who was the Primicerius of San Marco from 1229 and Patriarch of Grado from 1238.
