= Jacopo Tiepolo =

Doge of Venice from 1229 to 1249

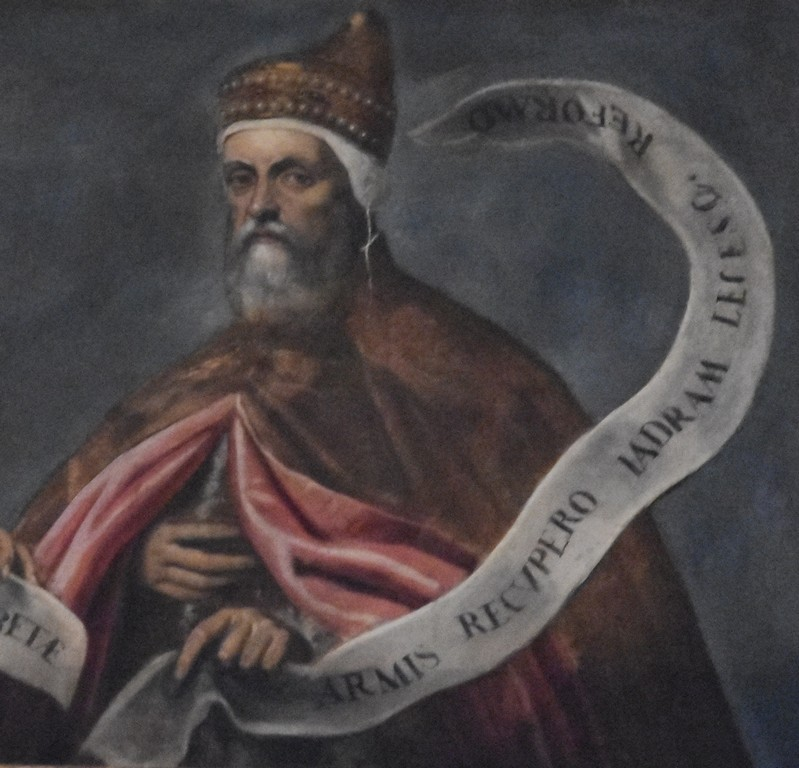
- Portrait by Domenico Tintoretto, late-16th-century

Doge of Venice
- In office 1229–1249
- Preceded by: Pietro Ziani
- Succeeded by: Marino Morosini

Podestà of Constantinople
- In office: 1218–1220; 1223–1224 (?)

1st Duke of Crete
- In office 1209–1214
- Succeeded by: Pietro Querini

Personal details
- Born: shortly before 1170 Venice, Republic of Venice
- Died: 19 July 1249 (aged c. 78–79) Venice, Republic of Venice
- Spouses: Maria Storlato (died 1240) Valdrada of Sicily (m. 1242–1249)
- Children: Lorenzo, Giovanni, and 4 others

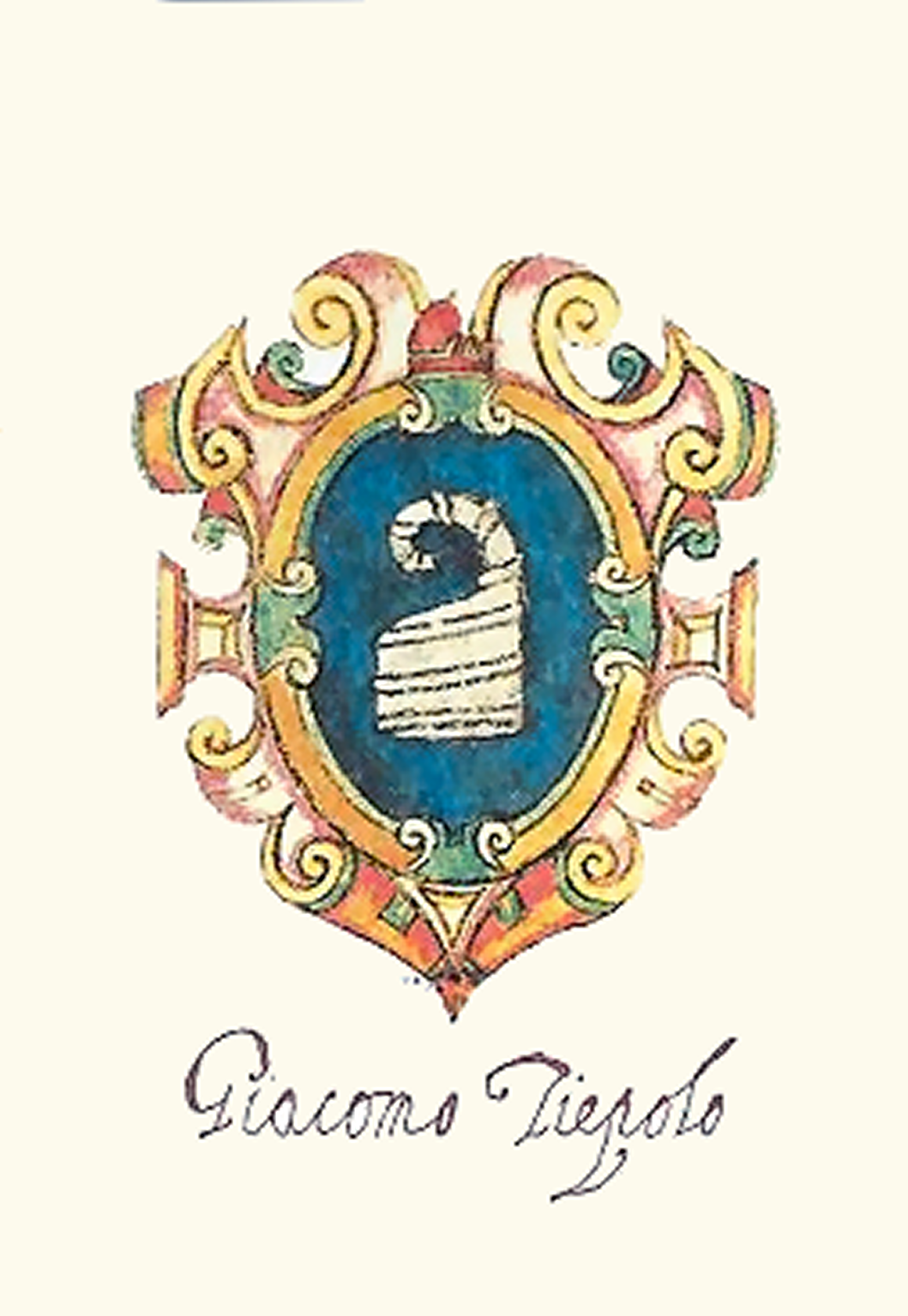
Coat of arms of Jacopo Tiepolo

Jacopo Tiepolo (shortly before 1170 – 19 July 1249), also known as Giacomo Tiepolo, was Doge of Venice from 1229 to 1249. He had previously served as the first Venetian Duke of Crete, and two terms as Podestà of Constantinople, twice as governor of Treviso, and three times as ambassador to the Holy See. His dogate was marked by major domestic reforms, including the codification of civil law and the establishment of the Venetian Senate, but also against a mounting conflict with Emperor Frederick II, which broke into open war from 1237 to 1245.

== Early life and career ==
Jacopo Tiepolo was the son of Pietro Tiepolo of the San Ermagora parish in Venice. The identity of his mother is unknown, as is the date of his birth, but it was likely in the late 1160s. His family was engaged in trade, and Tiepolo himself is first attested in 1190, as a merchant trading with the Byzantine capital, Constantinople (modern day Istanbul) In 1196, he is even recorded as participating in a merchant fleet to Constantinople which failed due to a mutiny of its crews at Abydos, at the entrance of the Dardanelles.

Unlike his ancestors, who had been merchants but uninvolved in Venetian politics, Tiepolo's social rise was couple with increasing participation in politics. Thus in 1205 he was one of the forty electors of Pietro Ziani, who had financed Tiepolo's trade venture in 1190, as Doge of Venice. In 1207 he served as judge in Venice, and in 1209 he was named as the first Duke of Crete, a post he held until 1214.

=== Duke of Crete ===
Tiepolo's job was to establish the Venetian administration over the island of Crete, which had been purchased by the Republic from Boniface of Montferrat. Tiepolo supervised the establishment of a Venetian colony, himself setting up the settlement of the island by military colonists from the metropolis. In 1211, a major revolt broke out against Venetian domination by the Greek inhabitants of Crete. Aided by the Genoese, the Greeks rose in revolt, so that Tiepolo was forced to call upon the aid of the Venetian lord of the Duchy of Naxos, Marco Sanudo. Sanudo successfully subdued the revolt, but initially refused to vacate the island. It was not until 1213 that Tiepolo was able to persuade Sanudo, through diplomatic means, to abandon his claims on Crete.

=== Podestà of Constantinople ===
This experience as a colonial administrator was likely a major reason why in 1218 Tiepolo appointed as Podestà of Constantinople, Venice's representative in the capital of the Latin Empire and governor of the local Venetian colony. He remained in this post for two years, during which he acted almost as an autonomous agent, concluding peace and trade treaties on Venice's behalf with the Emperor of Nicaea, Theodore I Laskaris, in August 1219, and with the Sultan of Iconium, Kayqubad I, in March 1220. His understanding of his role is exemplified by his assumption of the Byzantine title of despot and the appropriation of the appellation "ruler of a quarter and a half of the Empire of Romania" that was normally attributed to the Doge. During the interregnum after the death of Latin Empress Yolanda in September 1219, he was among the most powerful magnates of the Empire along with regent Conon de Béthune.

In January 1221, Tiepolo was in Rome to witness Matthew, the newly appointed Latin Patriarch of Constantinople, renounce his see's rights of jurisdiction over the Venetian ecclesiastical institutions in the Latin Empire, in favour of the Patriarchate of Grado. In the second half of the same year Tiepolo served as podestà of Treviso. In this capacity he signed a peace treaty with Berthold, Patriarch of Aquileia, which favoured the latter.

Tiepolo was back in Rome in April 1223, in order to obtain from Pope Honorius III the waiving of some ecclesiastical sanctions imposed on Venetian residents in the Latin Empire. After that, he sailed to Constantinople (likely in autumn of the same year), to again take up residence as the Venetian podestà. On 20 February 1224 he concluded an agreement with Latin Emperor Robert of Courtenay which confirmed the economic privileges the Venetians enjoyed in the Latin Empire. It is unknown when his tenure ended; his immediate successor is not known, and at the earliest he cannot have left Constantinople before autumn 1224.

In spring 1227, Tiepolo was again sent as envoy to Rome, and was again podestà of Treviso later in the same year. His second tenure there was marked by his legislative activity. On his return to Venice, in 1228 he was ducal councillor.

== Dogate ==
Jacopo was elected Doge on 6 March 1229, his predecessor Pietro Ziani having abdicated the month before. At the election, a stalemate was reached between Jacopo and his rival Marino Dandolo, both of them having twenty votes each. This was rectified by drawing lots, leading to Tiepolo's victory. This is thought to have sparked the feud between the Dandolo, who were an old aristocratic family, and the Tiepolo, who were seen as nouveau-riches. In an attempt to prevent the recurrence of a split vote in future elections, the number of electors was increased from forty to forty-one. Prior to ascending the ducal throne, Tiepolo also had to sign a traditional promissione, seriously limiting his powers.

=== Domestic reforms ===
Tiepolo's dogate brought significant change to Venice. The new doge promulgated new laws on commerce (1219), criminal law (1232), and codified civil law in the 1242 Statutum novum. Tiepolo greatly expanded the ruling class of the Republic, extending the voting right to the merchant class, from which he himself had come. The Great Council of Venice increased in importance under his rule, and the Venetian Senate was established. Additional to this, Tiepolo had granted land in 1234 to the Dominican and Franciscan orders, upon which two churches were built. These were the Basilica di San Giovanni e Paolo ('San Zanipolo') and the Basilica di Santa Maria Gloriosa dei Frari.

=== Foreign policy ===
In foreign affairs, Tiepolo continued his predecessor's policy of safeguarding the overseas possessions secured after the Fourth Crusade, the defence of the Latin Empire of Constantinople, a division of spheres of influences with Venice's rivals, Genoa and Pisa, and a dense web of diplomatic and commercial treaties with both Italian and Mediterranean states.

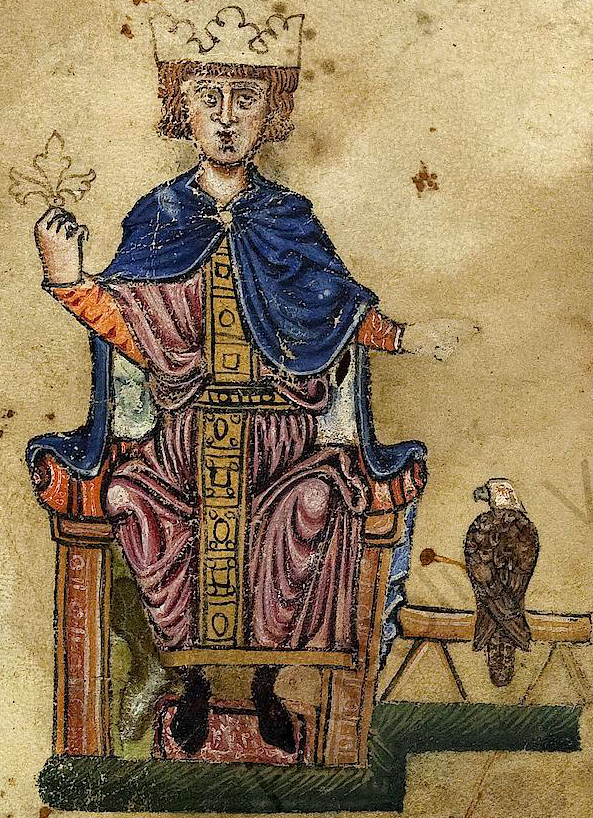
Emperor Frederick II

Despite Emperor Frederick II's cordial reception in Venice in 1232, relations between the Holy Roman Empire and the Republic deteriorated, as the Emperor pursued his own policies in Italy and the Mediterranean without regard for Venetian interests: notably the Sixth Crusade and the close relations with the Greek Empire of Nicaea, an inveterate foe of the Latin Empire. Conversely, the Republic adamantly refused to assist the Emperor in his conflict with the Papacy and the Lombard League. Not only that, but Venice gradually moved to active opposition of Frederick, securing the appointment of Venetians as podestàs in Lombard cities, and encouraging them to resist the Emperor.

After Frederick's victory over the League at the Battle of Cortenuova in 1237—in which Tiepolo's son, Pietro, led the Milanese forces and was taken prisoner—Venice allied with both Genoa and the Papacy. An envisaged Papal invasion of the Kingdom of Sicily, from which Venice would have gained control of the ports of Barletta and Salpi, failed to materialize, but the Venetians proceeded to campaign in Emilia-Romagna, capturing Ferrara in 1240. In the same year, in retaliation for Venetian attacks against the Apulian coasts, Frederick II ordered the execution of Pietro Tiepolo. Venetian agents also tried to oppose Frederick's policies in the Kingdom of Jerusalem, and in 1242, Tiepolo reconquered the rebellious city of Pula in Istria.

After the sack of Pula, Tiepolo married a second time, to the Sicilian princess Valdrada of Sicily. This union was viewed with suspicion, as it was held to signify Tiepolo's designs on securing the succession of his offspring to the Sicilian throne. This suspicion came at a time when a large part of the ruling establishment began growing weary of Tiepolo's policies and ambitions: indeed, in 1245, three leading Venetian patricians, Marino Morosini, Reniero Zeno and Giovanni da Canal, when captured and brought before Frederick II, repudiated the recently announced excommunication of the Emperor. This was a clear repudiation of Tiepolo's policy and marked an end to the open conflict between Venice and Frederick.

== Abdication and death ==
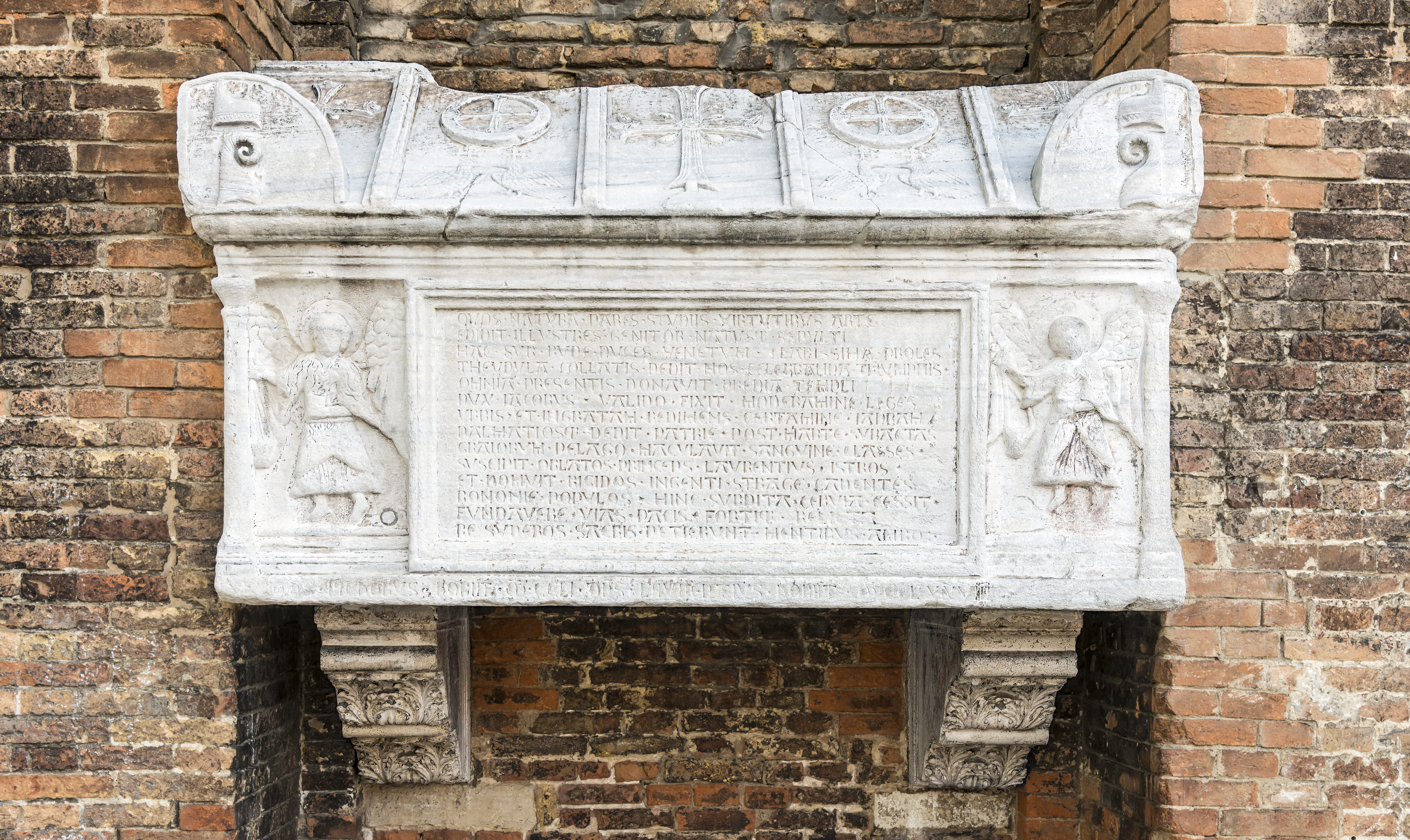
Jacopo and Lorenzo's Tiepolo ark, in Venice.

Tiepolo abdicated in May 1249, and retired thereafter to his private residence at Sant' Agostino, in San Polo.

Tiepolo died on 19 July 1249, and was buried in the church of San Zanipolo.

== Family ==
Tiepolo married twice, firstly to Maria Storlato, and secondly to Valdrada of Sicily. Maria bore him four children: Lorenzo, who served as doge from 1268 to 1275; the aforementioned Pietro, podestà of Treviso; a third son named Giovanni, who was active as a military commander in the war against Frederick; and a daughter, also named Maria, who married into the Gradenigo family. Valdrada bore him two children, both young at the time of their father's death, and whose identities remain unknown. She outlived her husband by around three years.

== Sources ==
- Jacoby, David (2006). "The Venetian Government and Administration in Latin Constantinople, 1204–1261: A State within a State". In Gherardo Ortalli; Giorgio Ravegnani; Peter Schreiner (eds.). Quarta Crociata. Venezia - Bisanzio - Impero latino. Atti delle giornate di studio. Venezia, 4-8 maggio 2004. Venice: Istituto veneto di scienze, lettere ed arti. pp. 19–79. ISBN 978-8-8881-4374-3.
- Nicol, Donald M. (1988). Byzantium and Venice: A Study in Diplomatic and Cultural Relations. Cambridge: Cambridge University Press. ISBN 0-521-34157-4.
- Pozza, Marco (2019). "TIEPOLO, Giacomo". Dizionario Biografico degli Italiani (in Italian). Vol. 95: Taranto–Togni. Rome: Istituto dell'Enciclopedia Italiana. ISBN 978-88-12-00032-6.

Political offices
Preceded by Pietro Ziani	Doge of Venice; 1229–1249	Succeeded by Marino Morosini
Preceded by Marino Storlato	Podestà of Constantinople; 1223–1224 (?)	Unknown Next known title holder: Teofilo Zeno
Unknown Last known title holder: Marino Dandolo	Podestà of Constantinople; 1218–1220	Unknown Next known title holder: Marino Michiel
New title	Duke of Crete; 1209–1214	Succeeded by Pietro Querini
