= Teofilo Zeno =

Teofilo Zeno was a 13th-century Venetian nobleman and administrator.

== Life ==
Teofilo Zeno may be attested as early as 1205, when a namesake provided the largest portion of a loan by Venetian citizens to the Venetian government. In 1217 he was Venetian bailo (consul and governor of the local Venetian colony) in Acre, the first securely attested holder of that post. In 1219 and again in 1222 he served as a judge in Venice. He served as the Venetian Podestà of Constantinople, in the second half of the 1220s, at the latest until spring or autumn 1228, as in September of that year he was ducal councillor in Venice, and in early 1229 he is called a "former podestà".

In 1231 he was again ducal councillor under Doge Jacopo Tiepolo (also a former podestà) and witness to a treaty between Venice and the Latin Emperor, John of Brienne. Likely as a result of this, Tiepolo reappointed Zeno as Podestà of Constantinople, at the latest in spring 1235. Zeno participated in the defence of Constantinople against the joint forces of the Empire of Nicaea and the Second Bulgarian Empire in the same year. His request for naval aid from Venice was answered and proved crucial in the siege's failure. Zeno was also one of the principal agents in arranging a loan for John of Brienne, with the Crown of Thorns as a security deposit.

Zeno likely remained in office until 1237, and is finally attested as judge in Venice in 1243.

== Sources ==
- Jacoby, David (2006). "The Venetian Government and Administration in Latin Constantinople, 1204–1261: A State within a State". In Gherardo Ortalli; Giorgio Ravegnani; Peter Schreiner (eds.). Quarta Crociata. Venezia - Bisanzio - Impero latino. Atti delle giornate di studio. Venezia, 4-8 maggio 2004. Venice: Istituto veneto di scienze, lettere ed arti. pp. 19–79. ISBN 978-8-8881-4374-3.
- Jacoby, David (2016). "The Venetian Presence in the Crusader Lordship of Tyre: A Tale of Decline". In Boas, Adrian J. (ed.). The Crusader World. Venice: Routledge. pp. 181–195. ISBN 978-0-415-82494-1.

Political offices
Preceded by Romeo Querini	Podestà of Constantinople; 1235–1237 (?)	Succeeded by Albertino Morosini
Unknown Last known title holder: Jacopo Tiepolo	Podestà of Constantinople unknown–c. 1228	Succeeded by Giovanni Querini
