= Leonardo Quirini =

Italian nobleman and Marinist poet

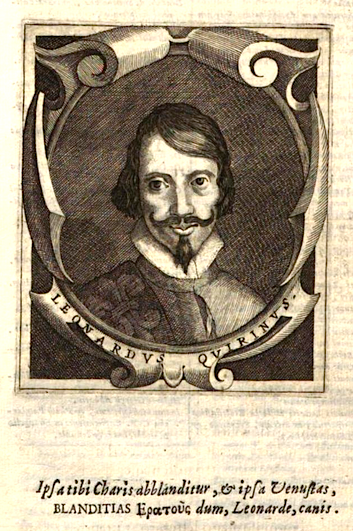
- Portrait of Leonardo Quirini. From the book "Le glorie degli Incogniti", 1647
- Born: Venice, Republic of Venice
- Died: Venice, Republic of Venice
- Occupation: Poet
- Father: Matteo Quirini
- Family: Querini
- Writing career
- Language: Italian
- Period: Seicento
- Genres: Poetry
- Notable work: Vezzi d’Erato
- Literary movement: Marinism; Baroque

Leonardo Quirini (Italian pronunciation: [leoˈnardo kwiˈriːni]; 17th century) was an Italian nobleman and Marinist poet.

== Biography ==
Leonardo Quirini was born into a Venetian patrician family. He was educated by the Somaschi Fathers. A friend of Giovanni Francesco Loredan he was a member of the Accademia degli Incogniti. He wrote madrigals on amorous themes, which tread a cautious path between Torquato Tasso and Giambattista Marino. His poetry is influenced by the work of Chiabrera and the classicists. His verse collection was published in 1649 with the title Vezzi d'Erato. It includes an idyll, Il Narciso, already published in Venice in 1612. The book was illustrated with a frontispiece by Luciano Borzone. Quirini was a friend of the painter Tiberio Tinelli. He composed a poem on a portrait that Tinelli had made of him. Many of his lyrics are included in Benedetto Croce's influential anthology of Baroque poetry.

== Works ==
- Il Narciso. Idillio. Venice: Trivisan Bertolotti. 1612.
- Vezzi d'Erato, poesie liriche (2nd ed.). Venice: Giovan Giacomo Hertz. 1653 [1649].

== Bibliography ==
- Quirini, Leonardo. Gigi Cavalli (ed.). "Giuoco di neve". Treccani (in Italian).
- Slawinski, M. (2002). "Quirini, Leonardo". The Oxford Companion to Italian Literature. Oxford University Press. ISBN 978-0-19-818332-7.
- «Leonardo Quirini nobile Veneto». In : Le glorie de gli Incogniti: o vero, Gli huomini illustri dell'Accademia de' signori Incogniti di Venetia, In Venetia : appresso Francesco Valuasense stampator dell'Accademia, 1647, pp. 308–311 (on-line).
