= Pietro Foscarini =

Pietro Foscarini was a 13th-century Venetian nobleman and administrator.

== Life ==
Pietro Foscarini is recorded as ducal councillor in Venice in 1231 and 1245. He served as the governor (podestà) of Chioggia in 1248, and was again ducal councillor in 1252/53. He served also as Podestà of Constantinople; the exact dates of his tenure are unknown, but he most likely assumed the office in spring 1254 and held it for the customary two years, between the tenures of Antonio Soranzo and Jacopo Dolfin. In 1263, he served as a judge in Venice.

== Sources ==
- Jacoby, David (2006). "The Venetian Government and Administration in Latin Constantinople, 1204–1261: A State within a State". In Gherardo Ortalli; Giorgio Ravegnani; Peter Schreiner (eds.). Quarta Crociata. Venezia - Bisanzio - Impero latino. Atti delle giornate di studio. Venezia, 4-8 maggio 2004. Venice: Istituto veneto di scienze, lettere ed arti. pp. 19–79. ISBN 978-8-8881-4374-3.

Political offices
| Preceded by Antonio Soranzo | Podestà of Constantinople; 1254–1256 | Succeeded by Jacopo Dolfin |
