= Marino Michiel =

Marino Michiel (fl. 1191–1250) was a Venetian nobleman and administrator.

== Life ==
Marino Michiel is first attested as a witness in Venice in 1191. In 1215, he was a judge in Venice. He was then appointed as the Venetian Podestà of Constantinople. Attested in the office in March 1221, he was likely in stalled in autumn 1220, with a tenure lasting until spring 1222. He is last attested in 1250, when he was the Venetian Bailo of Negroponte.

== Sources ==
- Jacoby, David (2006). "The Venetian Government and Administration in Latin Constantinople, 1204–1261: A State within a State". In Gherardo Ortalli; Giorgio Ravegnani; Peter Schreiner (eds.). Quarta Crociata. Venezia - Bisanzio - Impero latino. Atti delle giornate di studio. Venezia, 4-8 maggio 2004. Venice: Istituto veneto di scienze, lettere ed arti. pp. 19–79. ISBN 978-8-8881-4374-3.

Political offices
| Preceded by Jacopo Tiepolo | Podestà of Constantinople; 1220–1222 | Succeeded by Marino Storlato |
