= Albertino Morosini (Podestà of Constantinople) =

Venetian nobleman and podestà of Constantinople

Albertino Morosini was a 13th-century Venetian nobleman and administrator. He played a key role in Venetian politics and governance, particularly in territories under the Republic's influence. In 1209, he was appointed Duke of Crete, overseeing the island's administration during a crucial period of Venetian expansion in the eastern Mediterranean.

== Life ==
Albertino Morosini is first attested in Venice, in 1209. In 1237–1239, he served as the Venetian Podestà of Constantinople, during which time he contracted a loan on the Republic's behalf with the impoverished Latin Empire, receiving the reputed Crown of Thorns as collateral. He returned to Venice in spring or autumn of 1239, and later in the same year served as judge in the city.

Morosini also served as judge in 1243, as ducal councillor in 1250, again as judge in 1251 and 1253, as Duke of Crete in 1255–1257, and again as judge in 1258.

== Sources ==
- Jacoby, David (2006). "The Venetian Government and Administration in Latin Constantinople, 1204–1261: A State within a State". In Gherardo Ortalli; Giorgio Ravegnani; Peter Schreiner (eds.). Quarta Crociata. Venezia - Bisanzio - Impero latino. Atti delle giornate di studio. Venezia, 4-8 maggio 2004. Venice: Istituto veneto di scienze, lettere ed arti. pp. 19–79. ISBN 978-8-8881-4374-3.

Political offices
| Preceded by Teofilo Zeno | Podestà of Constantinople; 1237–1239 | Succeeded by Giovanni Michiel |
