= Marco Gausoni =

Marco Gausoni was a 13th-century Venetian nobleman, military commander, and administrator.

== Life ==
Marco Gausoni is mentioned in 1235 as one of the two commanders of a Venetian fleet sent to help Constantinople, the capital of the Latin Empire, when it was besieged by the joint forces of the Empire of Nicaea and the Second Bulgarian Empire.

In 1243 he was appointed governor (podestà) of Chioggia, and is attested as judge in Venice two years later. He then served as Podestà of Constantinople, likely from spring 1250—he is attested there on 29 August 1250—until autumn 1251, being one of the few holders of the office to not serve a two-year term.

== Sources ==
- Jacoby, David (2006). "The Venetian Government and Administration in Latin Constantinople, 1204–1261: A State within a State". In Gherardo Ortalli; Giorgio Ravegnani; Peter Schreiner (eds.). Quarta Crociata. Venezia - Bisanzio - Impero latino. Atti delle giornate di studio. Venezia, 4-8 maggio 2004. Venice: Istituto veneto di scienze, lettere ed arti. pp. 19–79. ISBN 978-8-8881-4374-3.

Political offices
Unknown Last known title holder: Egidio Querini	Podestà of Constantinople; 1250–1251	Succeeded by Antonio Soranzo
