= Battle of Constantinople (1241) =

Naval battle

- Part of the Nicaean-Latin Wars
Date	May–June 1241
Location	Sea of Marmara off Constantinople 41°00′50″N 28°57′20″E
Result	Venetian victory

Belligerents
Empire of Nicaea	Republic of Venice

Commanders and leaders
Iophre the Armenian	Giovanni Michiel

The Battle of Constantinople was a naval battle between the fleets of the Empire of Nicaea and the Republic of Venice that occurred in May–June 1241 near Constantinople.

== Background ==
In early 1241, while the Latin Empire was besieging the Nicaean fortress of Tzouroulos in eastern Thrace, the Nicaean emperor John III Vatatzes campaigned against Latin fortresses north of Nicomedia. With his fleet accompanying the army, he captured Dakibyza and Niketiatou. At the same time, however, the Nicaean fleet encountered a Venetian fleet that had sailed from Constantinople, and suffered a heavy defeat in a battle off the city's sea walls.

== Battle ==
According to George Akropolites, the Nicaean fleet had 30 galleys and the Venetian fleet 13. However, the Nicaeans lost 13 of their own vessels, which were captured by the Venetians, so that "each one of the enemy ships gained one trireme as spoil, with its men and weapons". The contemporary Venetian chronicler Martin da Canal, on the other hand, claims that the Nicaean fleet numbered no fewer than 160 ships, "including galleys and other large and small vessels, all of which were well equipped", while the Venetian fleet numbered only ten galleys. Under the command of Podestà of Constantinople, Giovanni Michiel, the Venetian fleet defeated the Nicaean fleet under Iophre the Armenian in the battle, taking ten Nicaean galleys captive. The date of the battle is fixed at May–June 1241 through the testimony of Andrea Dandolo.

== Historical assessment ==
Akropolites and a 14th-century hagiography of Emperor John III attribute this defeat to the inexperience of the crews, claiming that for many of them this was their first sea voyage. According to Akropolites, the fleet commander, Manuel Kontophre, had warned the Emperor that the Nicaeans would lose in any naval combat with the Latins due to their inexperience, only to be dismissed and replaced by Iophre (Geoffrey) the Armenian, an otherwise unknown personage whom Akropolites describes as "rather hesitant in matters of war". After the defeat vindicated him, Kontophre was reinstated as commander of the fleet.

According to the contemporary chronicle of Alberic of Trois-Fontaines, these hostilities were followed in June by a two-year truce between Vatatzes, the Latins, and the Bulgarian ruler Kaliman I.

== Sources ==
- Jacoby, David (2006). "The Venetian Government and Administration in Latin Constantinople, 1204–1261: A State within a State". In Gherardo Ortalli; Giorgio Ravegnani; Peter Schreiner (eds.). Quarta Crociata. Venezia - Bisanzio - Impero latino. Atti delle giornate di studio. Venezia, 4-8 maggio 2004. Venice: Istituto veneto di scienze, lettere ed arti. pp. 19–79. ISBN 978-8-8881-4374-3.
- Macrides, Ruth, ed. (2007). George Akropolites: The History - Introduction, translation and commentary. Oxford University Press. ISBN 978-0-19-921067-1.
- Morreale, Laura K., ed. (2009). Martin da Canal, Les Estoires de Venise. Padova. ISBN 978-88-8098-267-8.
