= Jacopo Dolfin =

Jacopo Dolfin or Giacomo Dolfin was a 13th-century Venetian nobleman and senior provincial administrator in the Venetian overseas empire.

== Life ==
Jacopo Dolfin is recorded as a judge in Venice in 1241, as being present in Tunis in June 1245, and again as a judge in Venice in 1254. In 1256–1258 he served as the penultimate Venetian Podestà of Constantinople, succeeding Pietro Foscarini in spring 1256 and being replaced by Marco Gradenigo. He went on to serve as Duke of Crete (attested in office in September 1259) until September 1261, and as commander of a fleet of 37 galleys in the Aegean Sea against the Republic of Genoa in 1262. In 1264 he was Bailo of Negroponte, before going to Constantinople as ambassador to Emperor Michael VIII Palaiologos. Along with Jacopo Contarini, Dolfin concluded a peace treaty with the Emperor on 18 June 1265, that would remain unratified by Venice. In 1268 he served as podestà of Treviso.

== Sources ==
- Geanakoplos, Deno John (1959). Emperor Michael Palaeologus and the West, 1258–1282: A Study in Byzantine-Latin Relations. Cambridge, Massachusetts: Harvard University Press. OCLC 1011763434.
- Jacoby, David (2006). "The Venetian Government and Administration in Latin Constantinople, 1204–1261: A State within a State". In Gherardo Ortalli; Giorgio Ravegnani; Peter Schreiner (eds.). Quarta Crociata. Venezia - Bisanzio - Impero latino. Atti delle giornate di studio. Venezia, 4-8 maggio 2004. Venice: Istituto veneto di scienze, lettere ed arti. pp. 19–79. ISBN 978-8-8881-4374-3.
- Nicol, Donald M. (1988). Byzantium and Venice: A Study in Diplomatic and Cultural Relations. Cambridge: Cambridge University Press. ISBN 0-521-34157-4.

Political offices
Preceded by Pietro Foscarini	Podestà of Constantinople; 1256–1258	Succeeded by Marco Gradenigo
