= Giovanni Michiel (13th century) =

Giovanni Michiel was a 13th-century Venetian nobleman, merchant, and administrator.

== Life ==
Giovanni Michiel is first attested as a merchant in 1213, in the Venetian colonies of Coron and Modon in southern Greece. He was one of four Venetian merchants who leased the two colonies from the Republic in the 1220s, and is again attested in the area in 1224 and 1234, as well as Negroponte and Thebes (in central Greece). He also held senior government positions, being sent as ambassador to Constantinople in 1223 and serving as ducal councillor in 1224, Duke of Crete in 1227–1228, and again ducal councillor in 1228/29.

In 1231 he is attested as a judge in Venice, then sent to Zara as governor ('count') in 1233, and again as judge in Venice in 1238–39. In 1239 he also began a two-year term as the Venetian Podestà of Constantinople, during which time he commanded the Venetian fleet in a victorious naval battle against the Greeks of the Empire of Nicaea.

After his return to Venice, he served as governor (podestà) of Chioggia in 1246, and again as judge in Venice in 1247–1248.

== Sources ==
- Jacoby, David (2006). "The Venetian Government and Administration in Latin Constantinople, 1204–1261: A State within a State". In Gherardo Ortalli; Giorgio Ravegnani; Peter Schreiner (eds.). Quarta Crociata. Venezia - Bisanzio - Impero latino. Atti delle giornate di studio. Venezia, 4-8 maggio 2004. Venice: Istituto veneto di scienze, lettere ed arti. pp. 19–79. ISBN 978-8-8881-4374-3.

Political offices
Preceded by Albertino Morosini	Podestà of Constantinople; 1239–1241	Unknown Next known title holder: Giacomo Baseggio
