= Antonio Soranzo =

Venetian nobleman and administrator

Antonio Soranzo was a 13th-century Venetian nobleman and administrator. He served as Podestà of Constantinople from autumn 1251 to spring 1254, when he returned to Venice. In 1261, he served as a judge in Venice. Nothing else is known about him.

== Sources ==
- Jacoby, David (2006). "The Venetian Government and Administration in Latin Constantinople, 1204–1261: A State within a State". In Gherardo Ortalli; Giorgio Ravegnani; Peter Schreiner (eds.). Quarta Crociata. Venezia - Bisanzio - Impero latino. Atti delle giornate di studio. Venezia, 4-8 maggio 2004. Venice: Istituto veneto di scienze, lettere ed arti. pp. 19–79. ISBN 978-8-8881-4374-3.

Political offices
Preceded by Marco Gausoni	Podestà of Constantinople; 1251–1254	Succeeded by Pietro Foscarini
