= Iacopo Barozzi =

Venetian aristocrat

Iacopo or Jacopo (I) Barozzi (died c. 1245) was a Venetian nobleman and official. He served as Duke of Candia for the Venetian Republic.

== Life ==
Iacopo Barozzi was born in Venice, in the parish of San Moisè. Beginning with Karl Hopf in the 19th century, several modern historians held that in the aftermath of the Fourth Crusade, Iacopo seized the Aegean islands of Santorini and Therasia, ruling them as their lord until his death c. 1245, when he was succeeded by his son, Andrea. This has been refuted in the later 1960s, when it was shown that Barozzi rule over Santorini can be documented only from the early 14th century on, with Iacopo's grandson, Iacopo II Barozzi.

Iacopo was registered in the Great Council, he was Vassano's ambassador. In 1238, Iacopo Barozzi together with Romeo Querini concluded a treaty with al-Kamil, Saladin's nephew, that stipulated the construction of a fondaco for commercial exchanges and a mutual prohibition of acts of piracy against each other. He owned a house in Tyre in 1243.

From 1244 to 1245, he served in the high gubernatorial office of Duke of Candia, in the Venetian colony of Crete. He is last attested c. 1245, and probably died at about that time.

== Sources ==
- Borsari, Silvano (1964). "BAROZZI, Iacopo". Dizionario Biografico degli Italiani (in Italian). Vol. 6: Baratteri–Bartolozzi. Rome: Istituto dell'Enciclopedia Italiana. OCLC 883370.
- Borsari, Silvano (1966). Studi sulle colonie veneziane in Romania nel XIII secolo (in Italian). Naples: Università di Napoli.
- Koumanoudi, Marina (2005). "The Latins in the Aegean after 1204: Interdependence and Interwoven Interests". In Laiou, Angeliki (ed.). Urbs Capta: The Fourth Crusade and its Consequences – La IV^{e} Croisade et ses conséquences. Paris: Lethielleux. pp. 247–267. ISBN 2-283-60464-8.
- Robbert, Louise Buenger (1985). "Venice and the Crusades". In Setton, Kenneth M.; Zacour, Norman P.; Hazard, Harry W. (eds.). A History of the Crusades, Volume V: The Impact of the Crusades on the Near East. Madison and London: University of Wisconsin Press. pp. 379–451. ISBN 0-299-09140-6.
- Jacoby, David (1979). Recherches sur la Méditerranée orientale du XIIe au XVe siècle: peuples, sociétés, économies. Variorum Reprints. ISBN 0860780503.
