= Giovanni Querini (Podestà of Constantinople) =

Giovanni Querini was a 13th-century Venetian nobleman and administrator.

== Life ==
Giovanni Querini is first attested in 1204 in Venice. In 1225, he was ducal councillor, and in 1226 he took up service under the Latin Emperor, Robert of Courtenay, though not before taking an oath to not do so against Venetian interests. He was thus a natural choice to become Venetian Podestà of Constantinople, likely after Emperor Robert died in January 1228. His term of office was nevertheless brief, as he was replaced in spring 1229 by Romeo Querini. He is finally attested as ducal councillor in Venice in 1231.

== Sources ==
- Jacoby, David (2006). "The Venetian Government and Administration in Latin Constantinople, 1204–1261: A State within a State". In Gherardo Ortalli; Giorgio Ravegnani; Peter Schreiner (eds.). Quarta Crociata. Venezia - Bisanzio - Impero latino. Atti delle giornate di studio. Venezia, 4-8 maggio 2004. Venice: Istituto veneto di scienze, lettere ed arti. pp. 19–79. ISBN 978-8-8881-4374-3.

Political offices
Preceded by Teofilo Zeno	Podestà of Constantinople; 1228–1229	Succeeded by Romeo Querini
