= Marino Dandolo (died 1233) =

Marino Dandolo (fl. 1195–1233) was a Venetian nobleman and administrator.

== Life ==
Marino Dandolo is first attested as a witness in Constantinople in 1195. He served as ducal councillor in 1207/08, as ambassador to the King of Germany, Otto IV, in 1209, and again as ducal councillor in 1210/11.

Dandolo is next attested as the Venetian Podestà of Constantinople in spring 1214, meaning that his tenure—usually of two years—was sometime between 1214 and 1216. In 1223 he was podestà of Treviso. In 1224 he was involved in an investigation on the embezzlement of funds during this time in office at Constantinople, but not personally accused.

During the ducal election of 1229, he was a candidate, but lost to Jacopo Tiepolo. In 1233 he was elected as governor of Zara (Count of Zara), but was murdered near Treviso.

== Sources ==
- Jacoby, David (2006). "The Venetian Government and Administration in Latin Constantinople, 1204–1261: A State within a State". In Gherardo Ortalli; Giorgio Ravegnani; Peter Schreiner (eds.). Quarta Crociata. Venezia - Bisanzio - Impero latino. Atti delle giornate di studio. Venezia, 4-8 maggio 2004. Venice: Istituto veneto di scienze, lettere ed arti. pp. 19–79. ISBN 978-8-8881-4374-3.

Political offices
Unknown Title last held by Ottaviano Querini	Podestà of Constantinople c. 1214	Unknown Title next held by Jacopo Tiepolo
