= Giacomo Baseggio =

Giacomo Baseggio was a 13th-century Venetian nobleman and administrator.

== Life ==
Giacomo Baseggio is attested as a judge in Venice in 1242 and again in 1252, as well as Venetian consul in Apulia in 1274. He also served as the Venetian Podestà of Constantinople sometime between 1224 and 1260, but the exact dates of his tenure are unknown. The periods 1231–1235, 1241–1246, and 1248–1250, when no holders are explicitly attested, are possible, but the medievalist David Jacoby considered the period of spring 1243 to autumn 1246 as the most likely. Probably due to his experience in Constantinople, he took part in the negotiations and ratification of the Byzantine–Venetian treaty of 1268.

== Sources ==
- Jacoby, David (2006). "The Venetian Government and Administration in Latin Constantinople, 1204–1261: A State within a State". In Gherardo Ortalli; Giorgio Ravegnani; Peter Schreiner (eds.). Quarta Crociata. Venezia - Bisanzio - Impero latino. Atti delle giornate di studio. Venezia, 4-8 maggio 2004. Venice: Istituto veneto di scienze, lettere ed arti. pp. 19–79. ISBN 978-8-8881-4374-3.

Political offices
Preceded by Giovanni Michiel	Podestà of Constantinople c. 1243–1246	Succeeded by Egidio Querini
