= Podestà of Constantinople =

- Formation: 1205
- First holder: Marino Zeno
- Final holder: Marco Gradenigo
- Abolished: 1261

The Podestà of Constantinople was the official in charge of Venetian possessions in the Latin Empire and the Venetian quarter of Constantinople during the 13th century. Nominally a vassal to the Latin Emperor, the Podestà functioned as a ruler in his own right, and answered to the Doge of Venice. The Podestà was also officially known as Governor of One-Fourth and One-Half of the Empire of Romania and was entitled to wearing the crimson buskins as the emperors.

== History ==
=== Background ===
The Venetians had enjoyed their own quarter in the Byzantine capital of Constantinople since the 1082 chrysobull of Emperor Alexios I Komnenos. How that colony was governed is unknown; most likely it elected its own local elders, but occasionally consuls sent from Venice, or passing captains of the Venetian fleet, may have assumed some political responsibility.

The Venetian position in Constantinople was immensely strengthened as a result of the Fourth Crusade, in which the Venetian fleet, and the Doge Enrico Dandolo, played a critical role. In the aftermath of the Sack of Constantinople and the establishment of the Latin Empire, he secured for Venice terms that made it paramount in the new state: the Republic claimed three eighths of the former Byzantine possessions, ensured recognition of the privileges the Republic had enjoyed under the Byzantine emperors, secured a dominant voice in the election of the Latin Patriarch of Constantinople, and pushed through its own candidate, Baldwin of Flanders, as the first Latin Emperor. Dandolo himself remained in Constantinople and received the exalted Byzantine title of Despot. Until his death on 29 May 1205, in the aftermath of the disastrous Battle of Adrianople, he remained the ruler of the local Venetians, and one of the most important statesmen of the Latin Empire.

=== Establishment of the office ===
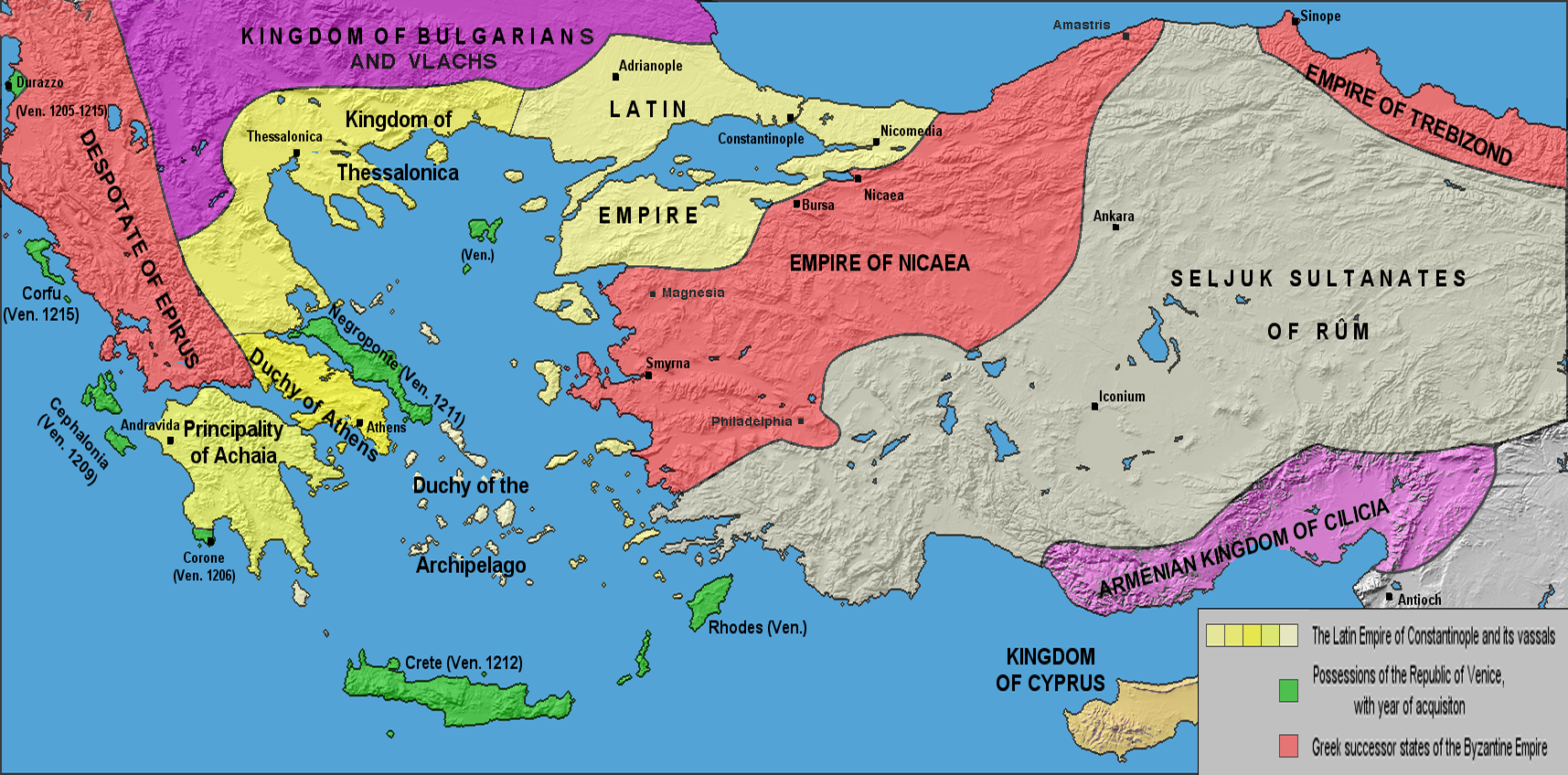
The Latin Empire with its vassals (in yellow) and the Greek successor states of the Byzantine Empire (in red) and Venetian possessions (in green), c. 1214

After Dandolo's death, the Venetians of Constantinople elected Marino Zeno as 'By the Grace of God Podestà and lord of one quarter and one half [quarter] of the whole Empire of Romania' in the Doge's stead. The use of such lofty titles was also a stake for influence given the existing power vacuum in the Latin Empire following Adrianople.

Already in the first act of the new official, dated 29 June 1205, he appears with his own privy council, with a composition similar to the council of the Doge in Venice: judges (judices communi), councillors (consciliatores), a treasurer (camerarius), and a prosecutorial magistrate (avocatorio). The Venetian administration set up its base at the Pantokrator Monastery complex. According to the 16th-century historian Daniele Barbaro, for a while after Dandolo's death it was seriously considered to move the capital of the Republic from Venice to Constantinople. Although in all probability a later invention, it is an indication of the size and eminence of the Venetian community in Constantinople become at this time, as well as the dominant role the Venetians played in the affairs of the Latin Empire.

When Pietro Ziani was elected Doge in Venice to succeed Dandolo, on the one hand he (reluctantly) recognized the fait accompli of Zeno's election and confirmed him in his office, but also moved quickly "to redress the balance" between the mother city and its colony in Constantinople. In the first of these actions, October 1205, Zeno ceded Durazzo, Vagenetia, and Corfu, territories belonging to the Venetian share of the Empire of Romania and strategically located at the exit of the Adriatic, directly to Venice, although in reality the area was held by the Greek ruler of Epirus, Michael I Komnenos Doukas, whom the Venetians recognized in these possessions in 1210 as a Venetian vassal. At about the same time, Ziani issued a decree allowing any Venetian or allied citizen to privately occupy and govern any formerly Byzantine territory, with the right to pass this possession on to his descendants. This decree effectively bypassed the Podestà as the nominal head of the Venetians in the Latin Empire: men like the Venetian Marco Sanudo, who founded the Duchy of Naxos, were thus subordinated directly to the Latin Emperor.

After 1207, the title 'Lord of one fourth and one half of the Empire of Romania' (dominator quartae partis et dimidiae Imperii Romaniae) was applied to the Doge rather than the Podestà, who became simply 'the Podestà of the Venetians in Constantinople' (in Constantinopoli Venetorum Potestas). The Doges retained that title until the 1358 Treaty of Zara, and although some of the Podestàs used it, it was only in their capacity as the Doge's representative.

=== Position within the Latin Empire ===
Based on an agreement concluded in October 1205, the Podestà and his councillors (consiliarii) formed part of the executive council (consilium) of the Latin Empire, which was responsible for defence and foreign policy matters, as well as adjudicating disputes between the Emperor and his feudal lieges, alongside the Emperor and the 'Frankish magnates' (magnates Francigenarum). However, the Venetian position was ambiguous: as Filip Van Tricht explains, Venice was "at one and the same time an independent state and a feudal partner in the empire". Thus the Podestà conducted his own negotiations and concluded trade agreements with neighbouring rulers, although this independence did not extend to other areas of foreign policy, and the commercial agreements appear to have been largely aligned with the Latin Empire's policy at the time.

The tension between Venice and the Emperor is evident in the frequent attempts by the emperors and powerful barons of the Latin Empire to intrude in nominally Venetian jurisdictions, and restrict and even revert Venetian claims and rights deriving from the Empire's foundational treaties of 1204–1205. This tendency arose very quickly: already by 1208, the executive council stipulated in 1205 had ceased to play its intended role, and the Emperor ceased involving the Podestà or the Venetians in his decisions. This development was aided on the one hand by the stabilization of the Empire's military situation after its catastrophic early years, and by the relative weakness of the Podestà and his councillors, given their brief and circumscribed tenures, vis-a-vis the Emperor and his barons.

=== Abolition and aftermath ===
In 1261, when Constantinople was retaken by the Byzantines under Michael VIII Palaiologos, the office of Podestà ceased to exist and the Venetians were expelled from the city. In the Treaty of 1265/68 with Palaiologos, under which the Venetians were allowed to return, and the subsequent treaties, the Venetian colony in the city was now headed by an official known as the Bailo (baiulus or rector).

== List of known Podestàs ==
- Marino Zeno, May 1205 – May 1207
- Ottaviano Querini, May 1207 – spring 1209, c. 1209
- Marino Dandolo, attested spring 1214, tenure sometime between 1212–1216
- Jacopo Tiepolo, in 1218–1220; during his tenure he concluded a treaty with the Empire of Nicaea, and received the title of Despot.
- Marino Michiel, attested March 1221, likely autumn 1220 – spring 1222
- Marino Storlato, spring 1222 – autumn 1223
- Jacopo Tiepolo (2nd tenure), autumn 1223 – at least until autumn 1224
- Teofilo Zeno, before August 1228
- Giovanni Querini, before September 1228 – spring 1229
- Romeo Querini, May 1229 – 1231
- Teofilo Zeno (2nd tenure), in 1235, possibly until 1237
- Albertino Morosini, 1237 – 1239
- Giovanni Michiel, 1239–1241; in 1241 he led a Venetian fleet that defeated a larger Nicaean fleet.
- Giacomo Baseggio, uncertain, likely sometime between 1243 – autumn 1246
- Egidio Querini, attested April 1247, sometime between 1245–1248
- Marco Gausoni, spring 1250 – autumn 1251
- Antonio Soranzo, autumn 1251 – spring 1254
- Pietro Foscarini, spring 1254 – spring 1256
- Jacopo Dolfin, spring 1256 – 1258
- Marco Gradenigo, September 1258 – July 1261

== See also ==
- Stato da Màr
- Palace of Venice, Istanbul

== Sources ==
- Jacoby, David (2006). "The Venetian Government and Administration in Latin Constantinople, 1204–1261: A State within a State". In Gherardo Ortalli; Giorgio Ravegnani; Peter Schreiner (eds.). Quarta Crociata. Venezia - Bisanzio - Impero latino. Atti delle giornate di studio. Venezia, 4-8 maggio 2004. Venice: Istituto veneto di scienze, lettere ed arti. pp. 19–79. ISBN 978-8-8881-4374-3.
- Madden, Thomas F. (2012). Venice: A New History. New York: Viking. ISBN 978-1-101-60113-6.
- Marin, Şerban (2004). "Dominus quartae partis et dimidiae totius imperii Romaniae: The Fourth Crusade and the Dogal Title in the Venetian Chronicles' Representation". Quaderni della Casa Romena di Venezia. 3: 119–150.
- Van Tricht, Filip (2011). The Latin Renovatio of Byzantium: The Empire of Constantinople (1204–1228). Leiden: Brill. ISBN 978-90-04-20323-5.
- Wolff, Robert Lee (1952). "A New Document from the Period of the Latin Empire of Constantinople: The Oath of the Venetian Podesta". Annuaire de l'Institut de Philologie et d'Histoire Orientales et Slaves. 12: 539–573.
