= Andrea II Barozzi =

Venetian nobleman (d. 1334)

Andrea II Barozzi (died 1334) was a Venetian nobleman and lord of Santorini in the Cyclades and Admiral of Romania.

He succeeded his father, Iacopo II Barozzi, on the latter's death in 1308. His possession of Santorini and Therasia was confirmed by a treaty between the Republic of Venice and the Byzantine Empire in 1310.

Ca. 1315 he was bestowed the title of "Admiral of the Empire of Romania", probably by the titular emperor Philip.

In 1316, his possessions were raided by Turkish pirates. Around 1325, Barozzi came into conflict with the Duke of Naxos, Nicholas I Sanudo, over his feudal status: the Dukes of Naxos claimed suzerainty of Santorini as lords of the Cyclades archipelago, but the Barozzi had equally staunchly refused to accept such an obligation. Despite the mediation of Venice, the conflict turned into open war between the two. A renewed Venetian intervention in 1328 eventually brought about an armistice in 1331.

Andrea II Barozzi died in 1334. His successor, Marino Barozzi, in 1335 withdrew to Crete where he died in 1359. The lordship of Santorini passed to the Dukes of Naxos.

== Sources ==
- Borsari, Silvano (1964). "BAROZZI, Andrea". Dizionario Biografico degli Italiani (in Italian). Vol. 6: Baratteri–Bartolozzi. Rome: Istituto dell'Enciclopedia Italiana. OCLC 883370.
- Frazee, Charles A.; Frazee, Kathleen (1988). The Island Princes of Greece: The Dukes of the Archipelago. Amsterdam: Adolf M. Hakkert. ISBN 90-256-0948-1.

Preceded by Iacopo II Barozzi	Lord of Santorini and Therasia; 1308–1334	Succeeded by Marino Barozzi
