= Marino Storlato =

Venetian nobleman and administrator

Marino Storlato (fl. 1195–1238) was a Venetian nobleman and administrator.

== Life ==
Marino Storlato is first attested as a judge in Venice in 1195, an office he held again in 1207, 1210, and 1215. In 1214 he was sent to a diplomatic mission to Constantinople, and in 1217, he was an envoy to Pope Honorius III.

Storlato then served as ducal councillor in 1219, and was then appointed as the Venetian Podestà of Constantinople, likely in spring 1222, as he was in the city by August of that year. In this capacity, he concluded a treaty with the Latin Emperor of Constantinople, Robert of Courtenay, on 15 April 1223. He remained in office until autumn of the same year, when he was replaced by Jacopo Tiepolo.

Back in Venice, Storlato was again ducal councillor in 1227/28, podestà of Treviso in 1228, and Duke of Crete in 1229–1230. After his return to Venice he was again ducal councillor in 1231/32 and 1237/38.

== Sources ==
- Jacoby, David (2006). "The Venetian Government and Administration in Latin Constantinople, 1204–1261: A State within a State". In Gherardo Ortalli; Giorgio Ravegnani; Peter Schreiner (eds.). Quarta Crociata. Venezia - Bisanzio - Impero latino. Atti delle giornate di studio. Venezia, 4-8 maggio 2004. Venice: Istituto veneto di scienze, lettere ed arti. pp. 19–79. ISBN 978-8-8881-4374-3.

Political offices
Preceded by Marino Michiel	Podestà of Constantinople; 1222–1223	Succeeded by Jacopo Tiepolo
