= Theoklitos Polyeidis =

18th century Greek monk and scholar

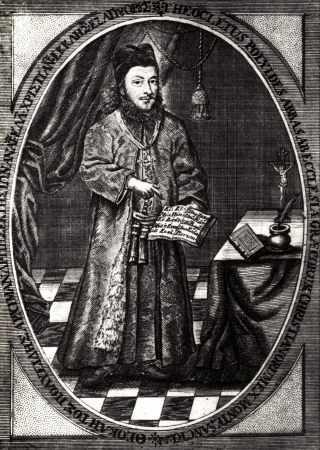
- Chalcography depicting Theoklitos Polyeidis in 1736
- Born: 1698; Adrianople, Ottoman Empire (modern-day Edirne, Turkey)
- Died: 1759 (aged 60 or 61); Leipzig, Electorate of Saxony, Holy Roman Empire
- Occupations: Priest, cleric, scholar, teacher
- Notable work: Oracles of Agathagelos

Theoklitos Polyeidis (Greek: Θεόκλητος Πολυειδής) was a Greek scholar, teacher, translator, priest and monk during the period of the Modern Greek Enlightenment.

His most notable work was the Oracles of Agathagelos (Οι χρησμοί του Αγαθάγγελου), a forgery presented as the prophecies of a 13th-century monk. The work was written c. 1750 and became very popular. It had a huge appeal in the court of Catherine II in Saint Petersburg and greatly enhanced philhellenism in the European cities Polyeidis personally visited. The Oracles of Agathagelos was also later republished by Rigas Feraios, promoting the revolutionary spirit of the subjugated Greeks, because they prophesied the future liberation of the Greeks.

== Biography ==
He was born in 1698 in Adrianople, then part of the Ottoman Empire (now Edirne, Turkey) to a well-off merchant father. He graduated from the Academy of Ioannis Zygomalas. He then became a monk in Iviron Monastery of Mount Athos. He became a deacon in 1713 and a presbyter in 1719. In 1725 he was ordained archimandrite, and in particular he was named by the Ecumenical Patriarchate as Grand Archimandrite, Grand Ecclesiarch of Mount Athos, and Bishop of Polyani and Kilkis.

In 1731 he travelled to Germany and then to Russia as an envoy of the Patriarchate. During his trips to Europe he visited Menorca, where he also served as a teacher and a pastor. Theoklitos came into contact with social, political, diplomatic and religious practices throughout Europe. He was concerned about the political implications of the Reformation and studied the problems that concerned the Greek diaspora.

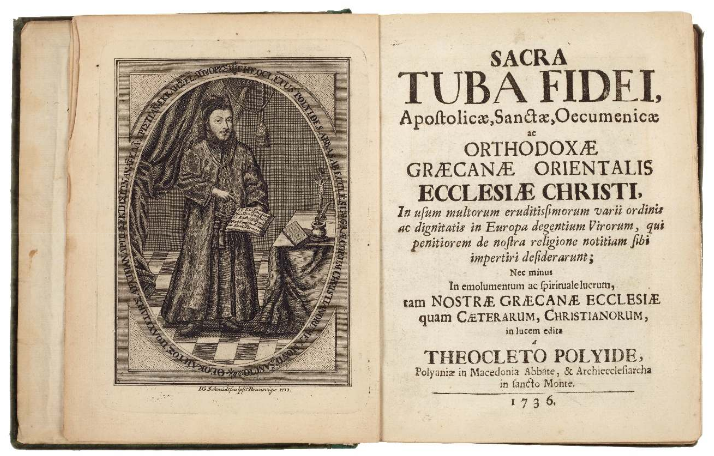
Sacra Tuba Fidei Apostolicae, Sanctae, Oecumenicae ac Orthodoxae Graecanae Orientalis Ecclesiae Christi, a work by Polyeidis in Latin

He then attempted to mobilize the Greeks by verifying old prophecies of the Byzantine Empire. He wrote the Oracles of Agathangelos (el), a well-known prophetic work which was published, with minor variations, widely in Greece, either as a brochure (by Rigas Feraios) or as a book in Athens and Ermoupoli (1837–38). He dates the oracles back to the 13th century (1279), and claims that the original author of the work is the monk Ieronymus Agathagelus from Messina in Sicily. The latter prophesies geopolitical events in the coming centuries (which Polyeidis, the true author, knew about). It fascinated the popular masses, who were becoming more optimistic about their liberation. Thus, the supposed Latin translator of the prophetic work, Theoklitos, remains under the shadow of the narrator Agathagelus.

He stayed in Dresden (1741) and shortly afterwards settled, after an invitation of the inhabitants, in neighboring Leipzig, where he founded the first Orthodox chapel (then of the Holy Trinity, now of St. George). He died in 1759 in Leipzig.

== Sources ==
- Dimitrakopoulos, Andronikos (1872). Orthodoxos Ellas: ētoi peri tōn Ellēnōn tōn grapsantōn kata Latinōn kai peri tōn syngrammaton autōn Ορθόδοξος Ελλάς: ήτοι περί των Ελλήνων των γραψάντων κατά Λατίνων και περί των συγγραμμάτων αυτών [Orthodox Greece: namely, about the Greeks who wrote against the Latins and about their writings]. Leipzig: Typois Metzger kai Vittig. pp. 177–178.
- Encyclopedia «Δομή», vol. ΙΓ΄ λήμμα:Πολυειδής, Θεόκλητος
