= Dacibyza =

Town of ancient Bithynia

Coordinates: 40°47′59″N 29°26′00″E

Dacibyza or Dakibyza (Ancient Greek: Δακίβυζα), or Dacibyze or Dakibyze (Δακιβύζη), was a town of ancient Bithynia located on the road from Libyssa to Chalcedon on the north coast of the Sinus Astacenus, an arm of the Propontis.

Its site is located near Gebze, in Asiatic Turkey.
