= Ottaviano Querini =

Ottaviano Querini (fl. 1181–1211) was a Venetian nobleman, ambassador, and administrator.

== Life ==
Ottaviano Querini is first attested in 1181, serving as either ducal councillor or judge in Venice. He then served as envoy to the Byzantine emperor Isaac II Angelos in 1189, and went again to Constantinople in 1198, securing an imperial chrysobull that granted privileges to Venetian merchants in the Byzantine Empire. By 1200, he was back in Venice, where he served as ducal councillor under Doge Enrico Dandolo.

It is possible that after the capture of Constantinople by the Fourth Crusade in 1204, Querini was one of the six Venetian electors in the election of Baldwin of Flanders as Latin Emperor of Constantinople. In August 1205, he was in Venice, serving as one of the electors in the election of Pietro Ziani as doge.

In April 1207, he was appointed as the Venetian Podestà of Constantinople, arriving in the city a month later. He remained in office at least until March 1209. After the end of his tenure there, he returned to Venice, where he is last attested in September 1211, serving as a judge and witness to the charter granted to the Venetian military colonists on Crete.

== Sources ==
- Jacoby, David (2006). "The Venetian Government and Administration in Latin Constantinople, 1204–1261: A State within a State". In Gherardo Ortalli; Giorgio Ravegnani; Peter Schreiner (eds.). Quarta Crociata. Venezia - Bisanzio - Impero latino. Atti delle giornate di studio. Venezia, 4-8 maggio 2004. Venice: Istituto veneto di scienze, lettere ed arti. pp. 19–79. ISBN 978-8-8881-4374-3.

Political offices
Preceded by Marino Zeno	Podestà of Constantinople; 1207–1209	Unknown Title next held by Marino Dandolo
