= Palazzo Querini Benzon =

Building in Venice, Italy

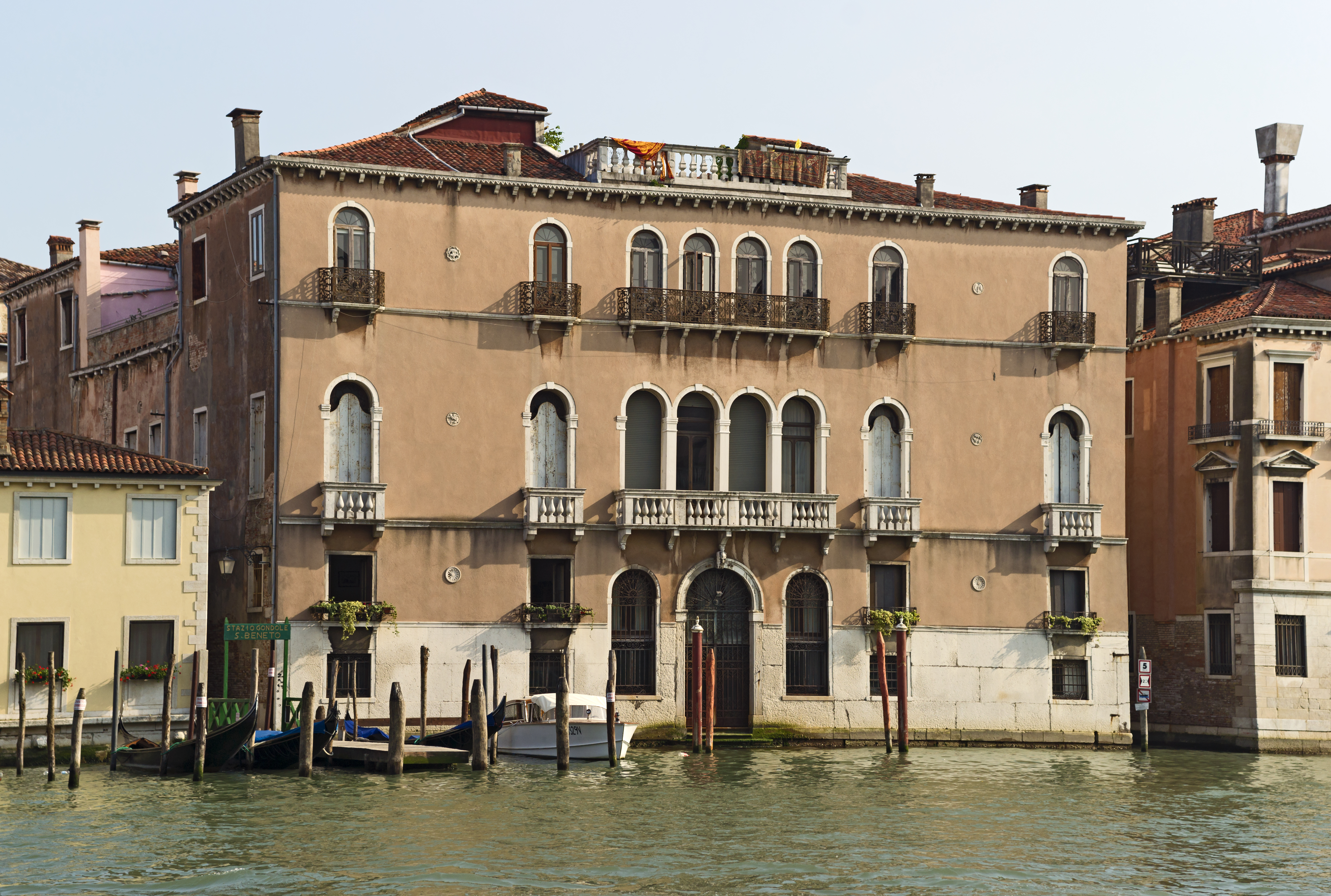
- Palazzo Querini Benzon
- Interactive map of the Palazzo Querini Benzon area

General information
- Type: Residential
- Architectural style: Venetian Renaissance
- Location: San Marco district, Venice, Italy
- Coordinates: 45°26′08.46″N 12°19′53.38″E
- Construction started: 18th century
- Renovated: 1897

Technical details
- Floor count: 3

Palazzo Querini Benzon is a palace in Venice located in the San Marco district and overlooking the Grand Canal. It is placed between the small Casa De Sprit and Casa Tornielli (also called Ca 'Michiel), at the confluence of the Ca' Michiel stream. Opposite are Palazzo Bernardo and Palazzo Querini Dubois.

== History ==
Built in the early 18th century, the palace takes the place of a structure previously demolished. The palazzo became famous thanks to the noblewoman Marina Querini (1757–1839), a wife of Pietro Giovanni Benzon, who, in the final period the Republic of Venice (1797), made her residence one of the most renowned literary salons in the city, thanks to the attendance of many important artists of the time, including Lord Byron, Thomas Moore, Ugo Foscolo, and Giacomo Casanova. Today the palace is considered a UNESCO World Heritage Site.

== Architecture ==
The building of no particular architectural merits has a water portal with a staircase, a noble floor with a quadrifora flanked by pairs of monoforas. All the openings are decorated with balconies. The second floor was added in 1897 as an imitation of the noble floor. Above the cornice, in a central position, there is a balustraded terrace. The ground floor is covered with stone; the rest of the facade is plastered. The facade is symmetrically decorated with six pateras.
