= Marina Querini =

Venetian salon-holder

Marina Querini (1757–1839) was a Venetian salon-holder.

== Biography ==
She was the daughter of Pietro Antonio Querini de San Severo and Matilde da Ponte and married in 1777 to count Pietro Giovanni Benzon. She hosted a famous literary salon in Venice. Among her guests were Lord Byron, Thomas Moore, Antonio Canova, Ippolito Pindemonte, Vincenzo drake and Cesare Arici. She was known for her live life and the muse for Anton Maria Lamberti.

== Places ==
She owned a palazzo in Venice now known as Palazzo Querini Benzon. Today the palace is considered a UNESCO heritage site.

== Sources ==
- Michela Brugnera, Gianfranco Siega, Donne Venete di Treviso, Padova e Venezia tra storia e leggenda, Edritrice Manunzio, 2010, pp. 139–142, ISBN 978-88-904879-0-3.
