= Egidio Querini =

Egidio Querini was a 13th-century Venetian nobleman, ambassador, and administrator.

== Life ==
Egidio Querini is first mentioned as the Venetian Podestà of Constantinople, on 4 April 1247, and was likely in office at least since the previous autumn. The exact dates of his tenure are unknown, but must have been sometime between 1245 and 1248.

After the end of his tenure, he served as ducal councillor in Venice in 1250, and ambassador to Pope Urban IV in 1261. Probably due to his experience in Constantinople, he took part in the negotiations and ratification of the Byzantine–Venetian treaty of 1268.

== Sources ==
- Jacoby, David (2006). "The Venetian Government and Administration in Latin Constantinople, 1204–1261: A State within a State". In Gherardo Ortalli; Giorgio Ravegnani; Peter Schreiner (eds.). Quarta Crociata. Venezia - Bisanzio - Impero latino. Atti delle giornate di studio. Venezia, 4-8 maggio 2004. Venice: Istituto veneto di scienze, lettere ed arti. pp. 19–79. ISBN 978-8-8881-4374-3.

Political offices
Preceded by Giacomo Baseggio	Podestà of Constantinople c. 1246–1247	Unknown Next known title holder: Marco Gausoni
