= Marino Zeno =

Venetian nobleman and administrator

Marino Zeno (fl. 1205–1228) was a Venetian nobleman and administrator.

== Life ==
Nothing is known of Marino Zeno's early life, before his election in May 1205 as the Venetian Podestà of Constantinople, in the aftermath of the capture of Constantinople by the Fourth Crusade in 1204 and the death of Doge Enrico Dandolo in the city. He remained in office until May 1207, when his successor, Ottaviano Querini, arrived in Constantinople and Zeno returned to Venice.

Zeno is next attested in 1217, when he witnessed the affirmation of Venetian privileges by the new Latin Emperor, Peter of Courtenay at Rome. In the next year, Zeno served as ducal councillor, a post he held again in 1224/25 and 1226/27, along with judgeships in Venice in 1226 and 1228.

== Sources ==
- Jacoby, David (2006). "The Venetian Government and Administration in Latin Constantinople, 1204–1261: A State within a State". In Gherardo Ortalli; Giorgio Ravegnani; Peter Schreiner (eds.). Quarta Crociata. Venezia - Bisanzio - Impero latino. Atti delle giornate di studio. Venezia, 4-8 maggio 2004. Venice: Istituto veneto di scienze, lettere ed arti. pp. 19–79. ISBN 978-8-8881-4374-3.

Political offices
New title	Podestà of Constantinople; 1205–1207	Succeeded by Ottaviano Querini
