= Romeo Querini =

13th-century Venetian nobleman and administrator

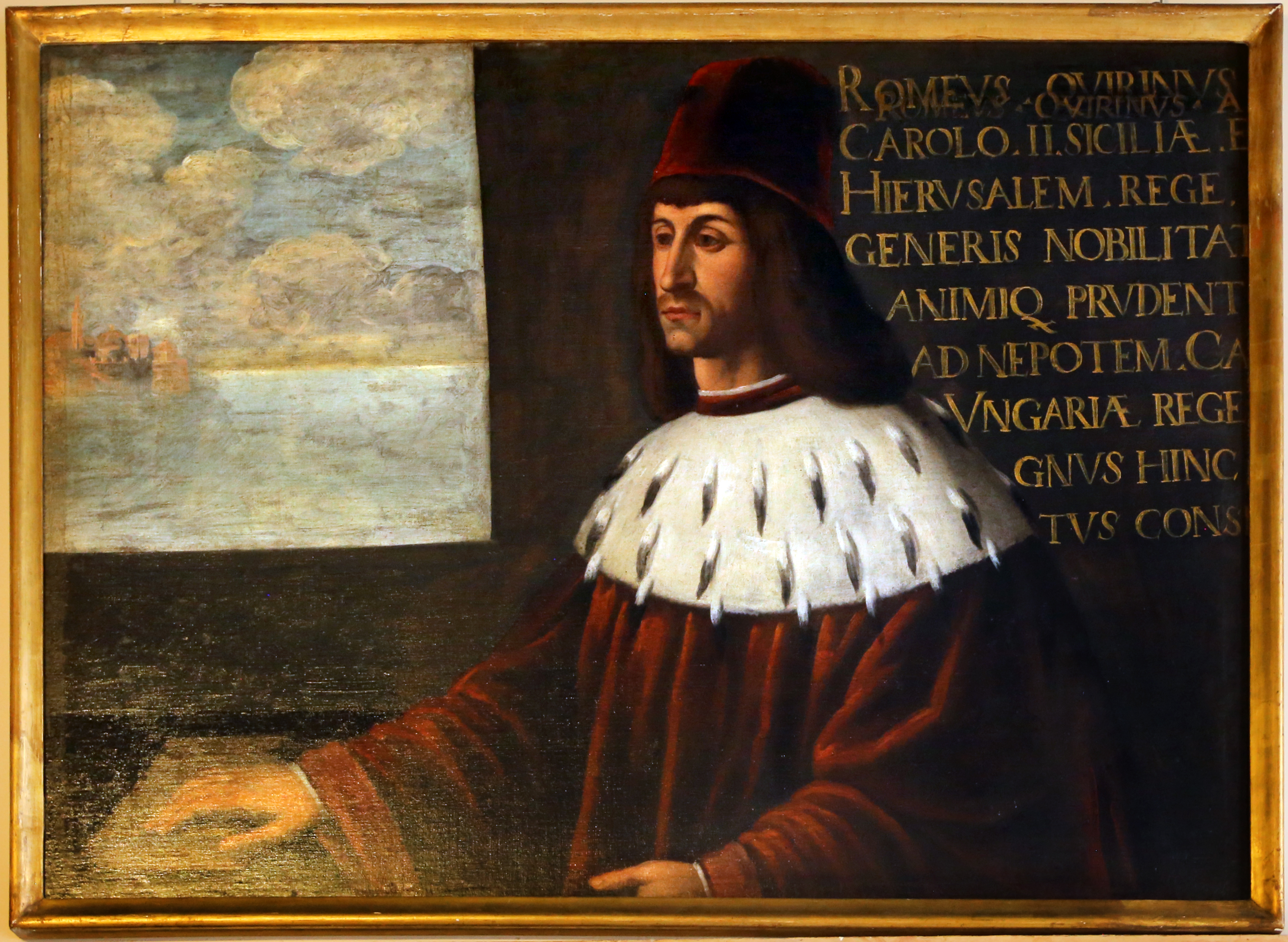
- Painting of Romeo Querini

Romeo Querini was a 13th-century Venetian nobleman and administrator.

== Life ==
Romeo Querini is first attested in 1209 in Venice. By May 1229 he was already serving as the Venetian Podestà of Constantinople. As his predecessor, Giovanni Querini, was still in office in December 1228, and assuming a normal tenure of two years, Romeo Querini likely remained in office until 1231.

Querini served as ducal councillor in Venice in 1233/34 and again in 1234/35, and as ambassador to Pope Gregory IX in 1239. He is finally attested as governor (podestà) of Chioggia in 1241.

== Sources ==
- Jacoby, David (2006). "The Venetian Government and Administration in Latin Constantinople, 1204–1261: A State within a State". In Gherardo Ortalli; Giorgio Ravegnani; Peter Schreiner (eds.). Quarta Crociata. Venezia - Bisanzio - Impero latino. Atti delle giornate di studio. Venezia, 4-8 maggio 2004. Venice: Istituto veneto di scienze, lettere ed arti. pp. 19–79. ISBN 978-8-8881-4374-3.

Political offices
Preceded by Giovanni Querini	Podestà of Constantinople; 1229–1231 (?)	Unknown Next known title holder: Teofilo Zeno
