= Iacopo II Barozzi =

Venetian nobleman

Rector of Chania
- In office 1290

Bailo of Negroponte
- In office 1295-1297
- Preceded by: ...
- Succeeded by: Francesco Contarini

Duke of Crete
- In office 1301-1303
- Preceded by: Michiel Vitali
- Succeeded by: Marino Badoer

Lord of Santorini
- In office 1301-1308
- Succeeded by: Andrea II Barozzi

Personal details
- Died: 1308

Iacopo, or Jacopo (II) Barozzi (died 1308), was a Venetian nobleman and the first lord of Santorini in the Cyclades. He also occupied several high-ranking colonial positions for the Venetian Republic.

== Life ==
Iacopo Barozzi was the firstborn son of Andrea Barozzi, a Venetian official. Beginning with Karl Hopf in the 19th century, several modern historians held that his family had ruled the island of Santorini as a fief following the Fourth Crusade, meaning that Iacopo was heir to its lordship, but this has been refuted in the second half of the 20th century, when it was shown that Barozzi rule over Santorini can be documented only from the early 14th century on.

Iacopo's early career was as a colonial administrator for the Venetian Republic in the Aegean: in the early 1290s he served as rector of Chania in the Venetian colony of Crete, then as Bailo of Negroponte from August 1295 to 1297, and finally as Duke of Candia in Crete from 1301 to 1303.

At the same time, a council decided to arm a fleet of eighteen galleys giving the command to Iacopo, during a battle of Modone and Corone.

Several islands (including Santorini) had been reconquered from their Latin lords by the Byzantine Empire in the 1270s in the wake of Licario's campaigns, but the tide turned in the beginning of the 14th century. This was when various Latin leaders took opportunity to establish new dominions in the islands, often resulting in subsequent conflicts with the Sanudo family of the Duchy of Naxos.

In 1301, the Duke of Naxos, William I Sanudo, who considered himself as the feudal overlord of the island, was preparing an expedition to recover Santorini. Its fate is unclear, but in a treaty concluded between Venice and the Byzantine emperor Andronikos II Palaiologos in 1302, Venetian possession of the island was recognized. In it, Iacopo was styled dominator insularum Sancte Erini et Thyrasie, but recognized only Venice, not the Duke of Naxos, as his feudal suzerain. As a result, the latter seized Iacopo as he was passing through his domains at the end of his tenure as Duke of Candia. The Great Council of Venice promptly intervened and ordered Iacopo's release. Contrary to earlier scholarship, Iacopo was thus the first lord of Santorini from the Barozzi family.

In 1306 he was temporarily in possession of the island of Nisyros. In 1308 retired to Candia where he died.

== Sources ==
- Borsari, Silvano (1964). "BAROZZI, Iacopo". Dizionario Biografico degli Italiani (in Italian). Vol. 6: Baratteri–Bartolozzi. Rome: Istituto dell'Enciclopedia Italiana. OCLC 883370.
- Borsari, Silvano (1966). Studi sulle colonie veneziane in Romania nel XIII secolo (in Italian). Naples: Università di Napoli.
- Koumanoudi, Marina (2005). "The Latins in the Aegean after 1204: Interdependence and Interwoven Interests". In Laiou, Angeliki (ed.). Urbs Capta: The Fourth Crusade and its Consequences – La IV^{e} Croisade et ses conséquences. Paris: Lethielleux. pp. 247–267. ISBN 2-283-60464-8.
- Loenertz, Raymond-Joseph (1975). Les Ghisi, dynastes vénitiens dans l'Archipel (1207-1390) (in French). Florence: Olschki.
- Vianoli, Alessandro Maria (1680). Historia veneta di Alessandro Maria Vianoli nobile veneto. (Parte prima-seconda): 1 (in Italian). p. 347.
- Robbert, Louise Buenger (1985). "Venice and the Crusades". In Setton, Kenneth M.; Zacour, Norman P.; Hazard, Harry W. (eds.). A History of the Crusades, Volume V: The Impact of the Crusades on the Near East. Vol. 5. Madison and London: University of Wisconsin Press. pp. 379–451. ISBN 0-299-09140-6.
- Anonymous (1876). "nn article". Johanniter-Ordensblatt: Amtliche Monatschrift der Balley Brandenburg (in German): 90.

New title	Lord of Santorini and Therasia; 1302/3–1308	Succeeded by Andrea II Barozzi
