= Agathangelos Xirouchakis =

Greek politician (1872–1958)

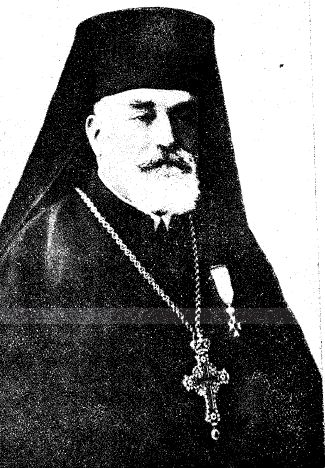
Agathaggelos Xirouhakis

Agathangelos Xirouchakis (Greek: Αγαθάγγελος Ξηρουχάκης, May 1872 – 1958) was a Greek Orthodox cleric and historian from Crete.

Born in Chania, he participated in the Cretan Revolt of 1896–97, studied theology in Jerusalem (1901–05) and the University of Padova (1906–11), gaining a doctorate from the University of Bologna in 1911. He served as a chaplain in the Greek expatriate communities of Venice, Trieste and finally Vienna (1920–36), where he also lectured Modern Greek at the University of Vienna. On 1 March 1936, he was elected as metropolitan bishop of Kydonia (Chania) and Apokoronas and returned to his native island being consecrated on 8 March 1936. During the island's occupation by Nazi Germany in World War II, he played a leading role in the administration of the island, being in contact with both the collaborationist government in Athens as well as the Greek government-in-exile in Cairo. One of the students that attended his lectures at the University of Vienna was the leader of the German invading forces in Crete, Heinrich Kreipe. During the occupation, he was able to place many of his relatives in German offices translating documents for the occupying forces, many of them women. Two of them Eleftheria and Rita Xirouchakis joined the small resistance group led by Manolis Piblis in Hania. Eleftheria spoke three languages, including German, and worked in a German office where she had access to classified documents that she would copy, translate and pass on to her resistance group.

On June 11, at a wedding reception, the Germans arrested the siblings except Artemisia who was a baby at the time. During the search of their house, the Germans found a diagram of the "Perivolitsa Camp" behind a painting on the wall. They interrogated the siblings and Eleftheria took responsibility for the diagram in order to protect her brothers and sisters. Her exact words according to German Lieutenant Volf Sinter were, "I am a spy, I work with the resistance group of Piblis and I will not reveal anything else."

They were all taken to the prison at the town of Agia where Eleftheria was severely tortured by the Germans Hoffman and Fritz Sterling to reveal her contacts in the resistance. During her interrogation, she was hung naked in the ladies room and beaten repeatedly for three days and nights but did not reveal any information. There was a German guard next to her 24 hours a day to prevent her from sleeping.

On July 13, 1944, the Germans executed Eleftheria. Her last words according to the testimony of German nurse Fritz Nider who went to check that she was dead were, "Away with your dirty hands so you don’t pollute a Greek woman. Long live Greece."

Kyriako, Manoli and Dimitri were sent to the Dachau concentration camp and Rita was sent to another concentration camp somewhere in Eastern Europe. They all survived and returned to Crete after the war was over. The three brothers returned the same day their parents were having a memorial for them in the belief that they had died. As documented by their descendants in the movie The 11th Day: Crete 1941.

On April 4, 2004, the cultural group "Omonia" honored Eleftheria with a statue at the church grounds in Aroni, Crete.

Aside from his religious activities, Xirouchakis was also an active scholar on Cretan history, especially its period as a Venetian colony. Among his works are:

- Ο Κρητικός Πόλεμος (1645-1669) : Συλλογή των Ελληνικών ποιημάτων Ανθίμου Διακρούση, Μαρίνου Ζάνε, συλλεγέντων και εκδιδομένων υπό του αρχιμανδρίτου Αγαθαγγέλου Ξηρουχάκη, Trieste 1908
- Η εν Κρήτη επανάστασις του 1363-1366 και το διοικητικόν σύστημα της Βενετίας απέναντι των κοινωνικών τάξεων και της εκκλησίας κατά την μακράν περίοδον της εν τη νήσω κυριαρχίας αυτής (1211-1669), Alexandria 1932
- Η Βενετοκρατούμενη Ανατολή, Κρήτη και Επτάνησος, Athens 1934
- Το εμπόριον της Βενετίας μετά της Ανατολής κατά τον Μεσαίωνα : επι τη βάσει των εμπορικών καταλόγων του Βαρθ. Παξή, 1940

== Sources ==
- Tomadakis, Nikolaos V. (1958). "†Αγαθάγγελος Ξηρουχάκης (1872-1958). Βιογραφικόν και βιβλιογραφικόν σημείωμα". Kritika Chronika (in Greek). 11. Archived from the original on 2016-03-04.
