= Battle of Barcelona (1359) =

Coordinates: 41.4019°N 2.1667°E

- Part of War of the Two Peters
Date	9–11 June 1359
Location	Barcelona, Principality of Catalonia, Crown of Aragon
Result	Aragonese victory

Belligerents
Crown of Castile; Kingdom of Portugal	Crown of Aragon

Commanders and leaders
Peter I of Castile	Peter IV of Aragon

Strength
81 naus, 41 galleys, 3 galiots, 3 lleños	10 galleys and a nau, several small vessels, several catapults and bombards

Casualties and losses
Unknown	Unknown

The Battle of Barcelona (June 9–11, 1359) was a naval engagement fought in the coastal region of Barcelona, Catalonia, Spain, between the navies of the Crowns of Aragon and Castile, during the War of the Two Peters. A number of months beforehand, a large Castilian fleet had been assembled at Seville by order of the King of Castile, Peter I. Consisting of 128 warships including royal vessels, ships from the King of Castile's vassals, and several others that had been sent by the Castilian-allied monarchs of Portugal and Granada, this large fleet had been entrusted to the Genoese admiral, Egidio Boccanegra, who was seconded by two of his relatives, Ambrogio and Bartolome.

With Peter I also on board, as well as many distinguished noblemen and knights, the Castilian fleet set sail from Seville in April. Traversing the coast of Valencia and forcing the surrender of the Castle of Guardamar, it appeared before Barcelona on June 9. The king, Peter IV of Aragon and III of Barcelona, who was present at the city, organized the defense, together with the counts, Bernat III of Cabrera and Hug II of Cardona. The Aragonese disposed of ten galleys, a nau, and several small craft garrisoned by companies of crossbowmen, besides a line of siege weapons. Despite its inferior size, the fleet managed to repulse the Castilian attacks in a two-day battle that saw the first use of naval artillery: a bombard was mounted aboard the Aragonese nau and her shots heavily damaged one of the biggest naus of Peter I.

== Background ==
The "War of the Two Peters" broke out in 1356, when a squadron of nine Aragonese galleys under Francesc de Perellós (sent by King Peter IV of Aragon to assist the House of Valois in their succession conflict with the House of Plantagenet) captured two ships under the flag of the Republic of Genoa near Sanlúcar de Barrameda. At that time, the captured ships were engaged in a war against the Republic of Venice and the Crown of Aragon. King Peter I of Castile, who was present at Sanlúcar during the event, felt offended and demanded that the Genoese vessels be liberated from Perellós.

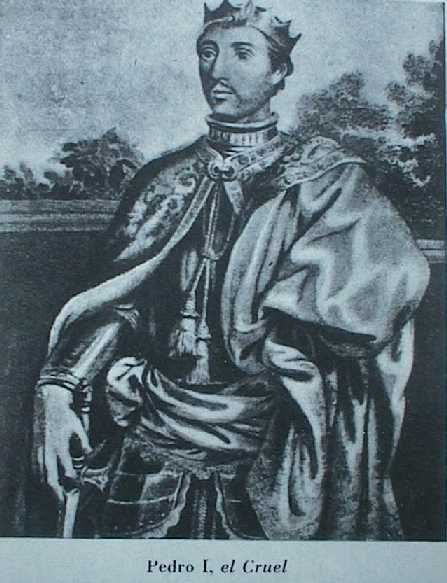
The king Peter I of Castile

Perellós refused Peter's demands and was chased by Castilian warships as far as the Portuguese coast. Peter of Castile complained afterwards to King Peter IV of Aragon, but as he did not obtain the desired results, he declared war on the Crown of Aragon. While both crowns promptly engaged in a bloody frontier war by land, in mid-1358 the naval campaign began with the landing of a Castilian army at the Valencian town of Guardamar. Led by Peter I, they quickly occupied the town. Its castle, however, held out for longer, and when a storm drove most of the Castilian fleet ashore, including six hired Genoese galleys, Peter I had to set them on fire and return to Castile through Murcia, defeated.

The following year Peter of Castile organized a larger expedition. Numerous ships were built at the shipyards of Seville, and many others were requested from Cantabria. The king, Peter I of Portugal, and Muhammed V, Sultan of Granada, also contributed ships to the increase in Peter's fleet. In all, the Castilian expedition numbered 128 vessels, of which twenty-eight galleys and two galiots were royal ships. Eighty others were Atlantic naus from the Cantabrian Villas, while the Portuguese and the Granadines sent ten and three galleys, respectively; a Venetian nau was also hired. Peter hoisted his flag in a large nau captured from the Marinids during the Siege of Algeciras by Alfonso X, which had been reinforced with three castles, one of them entrusted to the chronicler and naval captain, Pedro López de Ayala; another was entrusted to Arias González de Valdés, while the third was overseen by García Álvarez de Toledo. The ship's crew consisted of 100 men-at-arms and 120 crossbowmen, along with its sailors and Peter's entourage. This fleet set sail on April and moved along the coast of Valencia, where the Castle of Guardamar was captured. On June 9 it was within sight of Barcelona.

== Battle ==
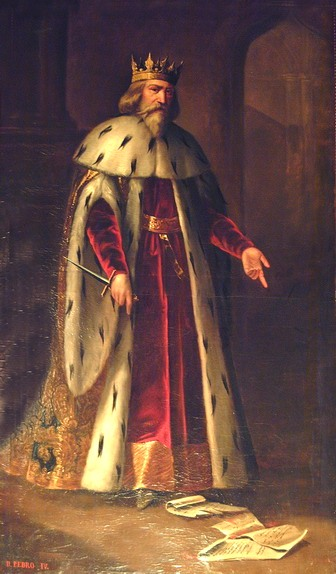
Peter IV, King of Aragon by Manuel Aguirre y Monsalbe (1885).

The naval forces gathered at the port of Barcelona consisted of ten well-armed galleys, several sailing ships and a very large vessel following the appearance of Peter I in the city. The forces were under the command of the generals, Bernat III of Cabrera and Hug II of Cardona, with Bernat and Gilabert de Cruilles, Bernat Margarit, and Pere Asbert as captains. The king, Peter of Aragon, took the command of the fleet and detached the galleys in a line along the beach, with the huge nau in middle of the line. All the vessels were covered by a shoal known as "Las Tascas", which stretched from just before the Convent of Sant Nicolau de Bari to the road of Regomir. Four machines named brigoles were installed near the shores to give additional coverage to the ships, which were reinforced by many companies of crossbowmen who had come from the Vallès under the command of several knights including Ramón de Pujol, Ramón and Bernat Planella, Bernat de Perapetusa, Ramón Berenguer de Vilafranca and Humbert de Ballestar. Armed parties of Barcelona's civilians organized according to their office were also divided along the perimeter to support the fleet.

According to the Castilian chronicler and captain López de Ayala, during the night the Aragoneses ran down numerous anchors before their line with the aim of keeping the Castilian ships as they approached the port to begin the attack. Whether true or not, the Castilian fleet sailed through the shoals and a stubborn battle ensued. At nightfall, Peter I withdrew his vessels and the battle renewed at 10:00 am, the following day. Then the Aragonese crossbowmen inflicted heavy casualties upon the Castilian seamen and soldiers, and the Aragonese artillery also caused serious damage to many ships. One of the biggest Castilian naus was hit twice by the fire of a bombard mounted aboard the largest Aragonese nau, which demolished its castles and left it dismasted.

== Aftermath ==
The Castilian fleet divided and part of the ships headed to the Llobregat river to get water. There they were confronted by many peasants of Barcelona and Sant Boi, and Peter I reorganized his forces and sailed to Ibiza, where he placed its castle under siege. Peter IV gathered a force of 50 galleys collected from Collioure, which he entrusted to Admiral Count of Osona with Cardona as vice-admiral. Relieving the island, the Castilian army left the siege and reembarked. Though he had numerical advantage, Peter I chose not to join the battle and withdrew. He was pursued by 15 or 20 galleys under Bernat de Cabrera. This force then anchored at the Denia estuary. The Castilians were then willing of fight, but as the Aragonese position was strong and supported by land forces, Peter I decided to sail back to Seville. Upon his arrival, Peter found that his armies had been defeated on 22 September in the largest land battle of the war at Araviana.
