= Boccanegra =

- Country: Republic of Genoa
- Founder: Guglielmo Boccanegra
- Titles: Doge of Genoa (non-hereditary)

The surname Boccanegra originated in northern Italy during the 13th century. The Boccanegra family produced the first Capitano del popolo and the first Doge of the Republic of Genoa.

== History ==
The Boccanegra family rose to power in Genoa. Guglielmo Boccanegra was "Captain of the People" and virtual dictator in 1257–1262, and his nephew Simone Boccanegra, who died in 1363, was the first doge of Genoa. Boccanegra was forced to resign his office at a public meeting he had called in December 1344. He regained power as doge in 1356 and ruled until he was fatally poisoned in 1363.

Simone's brother Egidio Boccanegra led the Genoese fleet in the Battle of Sluys, while Egidio's son Ambrosio Boccanegra was an admiral in Castilian employ in the Battle of La Rochelle.

== People with the surname ==
- Ambrosio Boccanegra (died 1373), Castilian sailor of Genoese origin
- Egidio Boccanegra (died 1363), Genoese admiral
- Guglielmo Boccanegra (died 1273), Genoese statesman
- Simone Boccanegra (died 1363), first doge of Genoa

== Fictional characters ==
- the title character of Simon Boccanegra, an 1857 opera by Giuseppe Verdi about Simone Boccanegra; also the character's granddaughter, Maria Boccanegra

== See also ==
- Bocanegra (surname), Spanish surname
