= Battle of Lisbon (1373) =

Capture of Lisbon by Ambrosio Boccanegra

- Part of Second Fernandine War
Date	7 March 1373
Location	Lisbon, Portugal
Result	Castilian victory

Belligerents
Castile	Portugal

Commanders and leaders
Ambrosio Boccanegra	Lanzarote Pessanha

Strength
12 galleys	More than 6 galleys and 15 naos

Casualties and losses
Low	High, only 4 galleys escaped

The Battle of Lisbon of 1373 took place on 7 March 1373. a Castilian fleet led by Ambrosio Boccanegra defeated a Portuguese fleet at the coast of Lisbon. The victory contributed decisively to Castile's victory in the Second Ferdinand War and it resulted in the capture and sack of the city.

== Background ==
Shortly after the end of the First Fernandine War, Ferdinand I of Portugal signed a treaty with John of Gaunt on 10 July 1372 in which they promised mutual aid against the Crown of Castile.

After signing the treaty, the Portuguese monarch ordered the seizure of Castilian ships in their ports, so that the supporters of Peter I were able to invade Galicia. Henry II of Castile reacted quickly and decided to invade Portugal. He placed his base of operations in Zamora, and in December 1372 he invaded it. While the land assault was successful, Ambrosio Boccanegra sailed with a fleet of 12 galleys from Seville to Lisbon.

== The battle ==
On 7 March 1373, Ambrosio Boccanegra approached Lisbon. After crossing the Mar da Palha, Boccanegra attacked a Portuguese fleet of more than 6 galleys and 15 naos under the command of Admiral Lancelot Pessanha, which was in the port of Lisbon, and which left the port to attack the Castilian fleet, knowing that it was approaching, in order to destroy it and keep the port open for the expected English reinforcements.

Their efforts, however, were in vain, because the Portuguese admiral did not act firmly and hesitated in his actions. That is why the fleet of Castile under the command of a firm and resolute Boccanegra was able to capture 2 of the galleys and most of the Portuguese ships during the battle and thus decide the naval battle in their favor. Castile occupied the city after the battle.

== Aftermath ==
Admiral Pessanha lost his post due to his performance in the battle and was replaced by Juan Alfonso Tello, while Ferdinand I of Portugal was forced to ask for peace from Henry II, since no English reinforcements had arrived due to the aftermath of the catastrophe at La Rochelle and he could no longer hope for one with the Castilian fleet in front of the port.

He was therefore forced to sign the Treaty of Santarém with Henry II on 19 March 1373. This marked the end of the Second Ferdinand War and also the last service of Ambrosio Boccanegra to King Henry II. After this, he retired and died at home the same year. His successor was Fernando Sánchez de Tovar.

== Bibliography ==
- Flood, Timothy M. (2018). Rulers and Realms in Medieval Iberia, 711-1492. McFarland. ISBN 9781476633725.
- Diffie, Bailey Wallys (1960). Prelude to Empire: Portugal Overseas Before Henry the Navigator. U of Nebraska Press. ISBN 9780803250499.
- Travel, DK (2017). DK Eyewitness Travel Guide Lisbon. Dorling Kindersley Limited. ISBN 9780241307953.
- Gutkind, Erwin Anton (1964). International History of City Development: Urban development in southern Europe: Spain and Portugal. Free Press of Glencoe.
- McKitterick, Rosamond (1995). The New Cambridge Medieval History: Volume 6, C.1300-c.1415. Cambridge University Press. ISBN 9780521362900.
- Saraiva, José Hermano (2012). Portugal: A Companion History. Carcanet Poetry. ISBN 9781847779779.
- Cortesão, Armando (1971). History of Portuguese Cartography. Junta de Investigacʹoes do Ultramar.
- Stevens, John (1698). The History of Portugal, from the First Ages of the World, to 1698. W. Rogers and Abel Roper.
- McMurdo, Edward (1988). The history of Portugal. S. Low, Marston, Searle, & Rivington.
