= Manuel Aguirre =

Manuel Aguirre may refer to:

- Manuel Aguirre, 20th-century Mexican general and leader of the Escobarista rebellion
- Manuel Aguirre de Tejada (1827–1911), Spanish politician
- Manuel Aguirre Geisse, Minister of Health of Chile for three weeks in February 1950
- Manuel Aguirre y Monsalbe (1822–1856), Spanish painter
- Manuel Aguirre (rugby union) (born 1959), Argentine rugby union player
- Manuel Bernardo Aguirre (1908–1999), Mexican politician
- Manuel Aguirre, a character in Rebelde Way, an Argentine telenovela
- Manuel Aguirre, a Jesuit missionary to New Spain
- Manuel Aguirre (1904–1969), Spanish Jesuit
