= Bocanegra (surname) =

Bocanegra ("Black mouth") is a Spanish surname. Notable people with the name include:

- Carlos Bocanegra (born 1979), American soccer player
- Daniel Bocanegra (born 1987), Colombian football player
- Francisco González Bocanegra (1824–1861), Mexican poet
- Gertrudis Bocanegra (1765–1817), Mexican guerrilla fighter
- José María Bocanegra (1787–1862), Mexican politician
- Juan Pérez Bocanegra (d. 1645), friar and musician of the viceroyalty of Peru
- Raul Bocanegra (born 1971), American politician
- Suzanne Bocanegra, American artist

== See also ==
- Boccanegra, Italian surname
