= Guglielmo Boccanegra =

Genoese statesman

1st capitano del popolo of the Republic of Genoa
- In office 1257–1262
- Preceded by: Position established
- Succeeded by: Oberto Doria

Personal details
- Born: Genoa, Republic of Genoa
- Died: 1273 (in exile in France)

Guglielmo Boccanegra was a Genoese statesman, the first capitano del popolo of the Republic of Genoa, from 1257 to 1262, exercising a real lordship, assisted in the government by a council of 32 elders.

== Biography ==
=== Origin and early years ===
The exact origin of the Boccanegra family is unclear. They were originally not members of the Genoese aristocracy, but rather "popolare" (burghers). Its first known member may have been a certain "Buccanigra" who is attested in 1201, and within a generation, several members are attested as merchants in the Western Mediterranean. In 1235, a Rinaldo Boccanegra was member of the commune council, followed by Marino Boccanegra 13 years later. Like other Genoese families, the Boccanegra were active participants in the Seventh Crusade of Louis IX of France, profiting from the provisioning of supplies and the equipping of ships for the Crusaders.

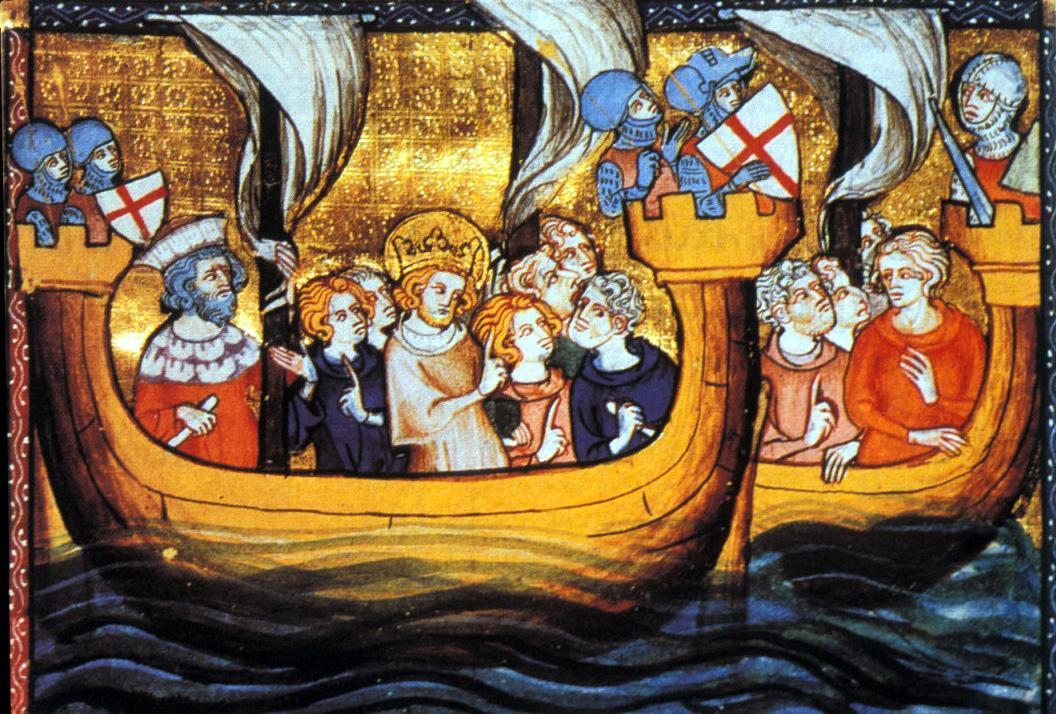
Louis IX embarking for the Seventh Crusade at Aigues-Mortes

Guglielmo is said to have participated in the Aragonese conquest of Majorca in 1229, but no evidence to substantiate this exists. He is first securely attested in 1249, as one of the Genoese consuls at Aigues-Mortes (the main embarkation port for the Crusade), while in 1249–50 he was at Acre, where he undertook to pay salaries to the followers of Alphonse of Poitiers, Louis IX's younger brother. On his return from the Crusade, he became a commune councilman, in 1251 and again in 1256.

=== Rise to power ===
==== Background ====
At the time, Genoa was emerging from the bitter struggles between the Pope, supported by the Guelph faction, and the Holy Roman Emperor Frederick II Hohenstaufen (r. 1220–1250), supported by the Ghibellines. Genoa had sided with the Papacy—especially with the election of the Genoese Innocent IV, r. 1243–1254—and expelled its Ghibellines from the city. During the conflict, in order to broaden the basis of the regime and gain popular backing, the Guelph nobles that dominated the Republic had established the magistracy of the two capitani del popolo e del Comune ('Captains of the People and of the Commune'), but with restricted powers. When Frederick II died in 1250, the Guelph nobles prudently allowed the exiled Ghibelline opponents to return to the city, and even gave them some compensation, in an effort to strengthen the nobility's position against the common people.

This policy was helped by the economic boom experienced during the 1250s: despite constant military commitments overseas, trade expanded, leading to an influx of bankers and money-changers, as well as artisans, from other parts of Italy and France. This prosperity was epitomized by the coining of the Genovino, the first gold coin issued by any Italian city-state. At the same time, the newfound wealth was unevenly distributed, accruing mostly to the hands of a few noble merchant families, and both popular discontent and the Guelph–Ghibelline divide continued to simmer beneath the surface. This came to the fore in 1256, when a succession of crises assailed the Republic. France stopped putting orders for new ships and refused to pay her previous orders; coupled with the end of the conflict with the Emperor, this left the Genoese economy, which had been long geared towards equipping warships, dry. The brewing trouble in the economy manifested itself when the Negrobono and Calvo banks and several wool workers went bankrupt in 1256. Domestically, the government had to enforce a Papal ordnance against heretics, while abroad, Genoa's position in Sicily and the Levant suffered setbacks, with the outbreak of the War of Saint Sabas against the Republic of Venice.

==== Coup d'état ====
It was this atmosphere of crisis that Boccanegra came to the fore, but why exactly remains a puzzle; as the historian Steven Epstein comments, his recorded career until this point was unexceptional. The historian Robert Lopez suggested that as councilman, he had attacked the abuses and suggested reforms, but Epstein remarks that he may have "possessed the political knack of being all things to all people": his wealth made him suitable to the elite, while his non-noble origin made him popular with the common people.

Matters came to a head during the trial of the outgoing podestà, Filippo della Torre, for embezzlement. Although his guilt was plain, he was only condemned to imprisonment and a fine, leading to riots by the common people. Incited by the Ghibelline faction with the cry of fiat populus ('power to the people'), in January 1257 the common people took up arms, assembled at the square in front of the church of San Siro, and proclaimed Boccanegra as sole capitano del popolo. Boccanegra, initially reluctant, was led into the church of San Siro, where the people swore allegiance to him.

The next day, the new regime took shape, at the Cathedral of San Lorenzo, in the presence of the new podestà. Boccanegra was given supreme power in order to reform the statutes of the commune, and was to be assisted by a council of 32 anziani ('elders'), four for each of the city's eight wards. A few days later, his position was further enhanced: the anziani extended his tenure to ten years, rather than the usual single year, and it was stipulated that if he died before that, one of his brothers would succeed him. A yearly salary of a thousand pounds, the palace of the Richerio family, a personal staff of a knight, two notaries and a judge, and a personal guard (12 guards and fifty armed servants) were placed at his disposal, all to be paid from the public treasury.

=== Rule over Genoa ===
==== Consolidation of power ====
According to Lopez, the long term of office, and the provision for a quasi-dynastic succession, effectively made Boccanegra's rule into a lordship rather than an ordinary magistracy. The podestà was reduced to handling the minutiae of day-to-day government. Seeing his powers curtailed, the incumbent podestà resigned, and was replaced by another, more amenable to Boccanegra. According to Epstein, the people who actually brought Boccanegra to power were the disenfranchised middle classes—the "middling traders and master artisans"—that had gained in prosperity during the previous years, but were still excluded from governance. The Ghibelline nobles, who had wanted to see a change of faction rather than the installation of a new regime, began to oppose Boccanegra. Opposed by the aristocracy, Boccanegra's regime would gradually become more authoritarian and increasingly rely on support from the common people.

With popular backing, and the support of some of the Ghibelline families, Boccanegra was able to weather the first crisis of his regime, Boccanegra reserved the nomination of all officials for himself. The Guelph nobles soon conspired against him, but Boccanegra, apprised of their plans, allowed them to be warned that he would severely punish them. As a result, the nobles fled the city, and were promptly banned from returning. In the aftermath of this affair, Boccanegra settled in the palace of one of their leaders, Obizzo Fieschi. His position was further strengthened when Cardinal Ottobuono Fieschi, who had arrived under the pretext of a diplomatic mission, but in reality to stir up opposition against him, was forced to leave the city after the people rioted. By 1260, Boccanegra was at the height of his power and prestige, and governed the city as a de facto autocrat ("velut tyrannus", according to the pro-aristocratic Annales ianuenses).

==== Financial reforms ====
With his position consolidated, Boccanegra turned to the mounting financial crisis he had inherited. The Commune's taxable revenue had been already purchased in advance by officials of the previous regime at low prices, in contravention of the existing laws. Boccanegra was loath to raise new indirect taxes, so with a decree issued on 16 June 1259, he converted all public debt into a consolidated and redeemable loan, at a modest and fixed interest of eight percent. This measure, which was sworn to by both the popular assembly and prominent Ghibelline nobles, not only hurt many magnates, but also gave Boccanegra the funds necessary for an expansionary fiscal policy. The chief pillar of this policy was a public works programme, including the building of a new town hall—the Palazzo San Giorgio—and the expansion of the harbour facilities. Apart from the functional and symbolical value of these constructions, these new buildings also employed many citizens, helping to end the crisis.

At the same time, he successfully strove to eliminate many feudal taxes levied by the Malaspina marquesses and other lords of the Ligurian countryside, that pre-dated the establishment of the Genoese Commune; he purchased at a favorable rate the rights of the Archbishopric of Genoa on maritime trade; and tried, without success, to eliminate the taxes levied by a few noble families as part of their inheritance from the now-abolished viscounts of the region. The banking crisis continued into 1259, with mixed success. Boccanegra managed to avert the bankruptcy of the Aschieri bank, and the influence of his brother, Lanfranco, resulted in the rescue of the bank of Oberto di Nizza, but despite promising to pay its creditors 90% of their debts, he was unable to prevent the bankruptcy of one of the most important banks, that of Guglielmo Leccacorvo. At the same time, Boccanegra encouraged the organization of the city's artisans into guilds, and from 1259 on included the heads of the guilds are represented, along with the Commune councillors and the anziani, among those ratifying treaties on behalf of the Republic. In addition, his treaty with Manfred of Sicily (see below) helped revive commerce.

==== Foreign affairs ====
One of the first steps Boccanegra took was a treaty with Frederick II's son, Manfred of Sicily, which once more opened the Kingdom of Sicily to Genoese commerce. This was a departure from the policy followed by the Guelph-dominated government until then, which sought to impose terms on Manfred via the Papacy. On the other hand, the ongoing war with Pisa over Sardinia took a turn for the worse, with the loss of Cagliari and Santa Igia.

The main problem that Boccanegra had inherited, however, was the conflict with Venice over access to the markets of the Levant: the War of Saint Sabas. Following two naval defeats, in 1258 the Genoese lost Acre, their main trade entrepot to the region, to the Venetians allied with the Pisans. The loss was made somewhat redressed when the pro-Ghibelline Lord of Tyre, Philip of Montfort, offered to accommodate the Genoese there instead, but the defeats eroded Boccanegra's prestige, and showed the problems arising from the new regime: the defeated admirals were not chosen for ability, but for political reliability, and the war exacerbated the Republic's financial situation.

The major accomplishment of his administration was the conclusion with the Byzantine Emperor Michael VIII Palaiologos of the Treaty of Nymphaeum on 13 March 1261. The treaty obliged Genoa to furnish a fleet of 50 vessels, with their expenses paid by the Emperor, for service against Venice and in support of Palaiologos' aim of recovering Constantinople. In exchange, however, the Genoese secured very advantageous commercial terms; following a successful recovery of Constantinople, the Genoese stood to effectively inherit and even expand upon the privileged position that the Venetians held in the Latin Empire. In the event, Constantinople was recovered by the Nicaeans barely a fortnight after the treaty was signed, without the need for Genoese naval assistance. Nevertheless, Michael VIII scrupulously observed the terms of the Treaty of Nymphaeum, as Genoese naval strength was still necessary to confront a potential Venetian counterstrike while a native Byzantine fleet was slowly being re-established. With the Emperor's subsidies, the Genoese were able to increase their fleet strength considerably.

=== Exile and death ===
However, Boccanegra failed to silence the domestic opposition of the old noble families, who deposed him in a bloody coup in May 1262. In exile, Boccanegra entered the service of the King of France, undertaking the fortification of Aigues-Mortes as its governor. He died there sometime in 1273.

== Legacy ==
Boccanegra's rule inaugurated a period in Genoese history named after the recurrent rule of capitani del popolo, mostly from the Ghibelline Spinola and Doria families, in between periods of rule by podestàs. This lasted until 1311, and is generally considered by historians as "the most brilliant phase of the city's prosperity and influence".

Nevertheless, the memory of Boccanegra's rule was controversial: the annalists, who represent the interests of the city's elites, treat him with hostility, but the common people soon grew nostalgic for a "popular" government. This sentiment would aid Guglielmo's great-grandson, Simone Boccanegra, to become the first doge of the Republic in 1339.

== Sources ==
- Balard, Michel (1978). La Romanie génoise (XIIe-Début du XVe siècle) [Genoese Romania (12th-early 15th century)] (in French). Vol. 1. Rome: École Française de Rome. OCLC 300152785.
- Epstein, Steven A. (1996). Genoa and the Genoese, 958-1528. University of North Carolina Press. ISBN 978-0-8078-4992-7.
- Geanakoplos, Deno John (1959). Emperor Michael Palaeologus and the West, 1258–1282: A Study in Byzantine-Latin Relations. Cambridge, Massachusetts: Harvard University Press.
- Lopez, Robert Sabatino (1969). "BOCCANEGRA, Guglielmo". Dizionario Biografico degli Italiani (in Italian). Vol. 11: Boccadibue–Bonetti. Rome: Istituto dell'Enciclopedia Italiana. ISBN 978-88-12-00032-6.
