= First Fernandine War =

Civil war in the Iberian Peninsula from 1369 to 1371

- Part of the 100 Years War
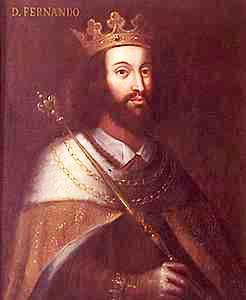
- Ferdinand I of Portugal
| Date | 1369–1371 |
| Location | Iberian Peninsula |
| Result | Treaty of Alcoutim Treaty of Tui (1372) |

Belligerents
| Portuguese House of Burgundy: Kingdom of Portugal and the Algarve; Kingdom of Galicia; Crown of Aragon; Emirate of Granada Zamoran Rebels | House of Trastámara: Crown of Castile; Kingdom of Seville; Kingdom of France; White Company |

Commanders and leaders
| Ferdinand I of Portugal; Peter IV of Aragon; Lanzarote Pessanha; Ferdinand Alfonso of Valencia; Fernando Ruiz de Castro; Vasco Gomes de Abreu; John Alfonso of Zamora Muhammad V of Granada | Henry of Trastámara; Ambrosio Bocanegra; Juana Manuel of Villena; Pedro Rodrigues Sarmento; Pedro Manrique; Charles V of France Bertrand du Guesclin |

Strength
| Unknown | Unknown |

Casualties and losses
| Unknown | Unknown |

The First Fernandine War was the initial conflict in the series of wars between the Kingdom of Portugal and the Crown of Castile during the late 14th century. It commenced in 1369 following the assassination of King Pedro I of Castile and concluded in 1371 with the signing of the Treaty of Alcoutim.

== Background ==
The war was primarily a dynastic struggle, with King Ferdinand I of Portugal asserting his claim to the Castilian throne after the murder of his cousin, King Pedro I. This claim was contested by Henry II of Castile, who had seized the throne through assassination. The conflict was marked by border skirmishes, sieges, and naval engagements.

== Key Events ==
=== Sack of Cádiz ===
In 1370, Portuguese forces Sacked the Andalusian port city of Cádiz to stop Castilian maritime activities and assert Portuguese naval presence in the region. The raid resulted in significant damage to the city and big Profit for the Portuguese and their naval operations.

=== Naval Blockade of Seville ===
In the same year, an armada headed for Seville consisting of thirty-two galleys and thirty ships. That were under the command of Admiral Lançarote Pessanha and Captain-Major João Focim, a Castilian knight exiled in Portugal Launched a naval blockade on Seville. The main objective was to immobilize the Castilian fleet and block supplies to Seville.

=== Siege of Monção ===
In 1369, Castilian forces laid siege to the town of Monção, located in northern Portugal. The defenders, led by Captain Vasco Gomes de Abreu and his wife, Deu-la-Deu Martins, faced dire conditions. According to local legend, Deu-la-Deu Martins baked a small amount of bread and threw it over the walls to deceive the besiegers into thinking the town had ample supplies. This ruse led to the lifting of the siege and a Portuguese victory.

=== Battle of Porto de Bois ===
The Battle of Porto de Bois was the decisive last engagement during the First Fernandine War. Portuguese and Castilian armies clashed near the Pambre River. The Portuguese and their Galician supporters were crushed by the Castilian and French Coalition, ending the First Fernandine War.

== Conclusion ==
The First Fernandine War concluded in 1371 with the signing of the Treaty of Alcoutim, which temporarily halted hostilities between Portugal and Castile. However, Portugal betrayed the Castilian treaty, eventually leading to the Second Fernandine War in 1372.
