= Ambrosio Boccanegra =

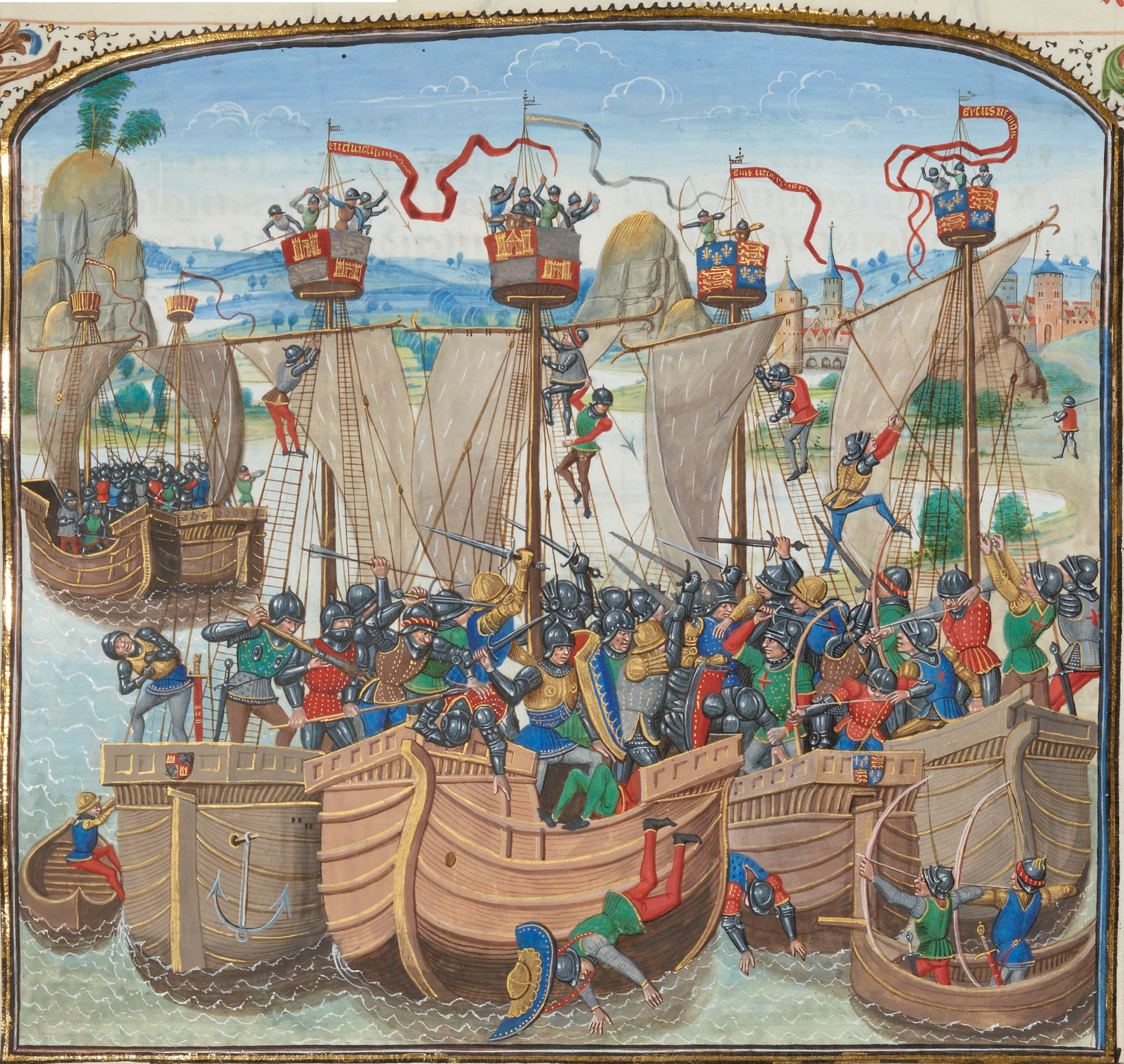

Ambrosio Boccanegra (died 1373) was a Castilian sailor of Genoese origin from the Boccanegra family. He was the nephew of Simone Boccanegra, the first Doge of Genoa, son of Egidio Bocanegra, who in 1341 went to Castile with a fleet in support of King Alfonso XI of Castile. He commanded the Castilian forces at the Battle of La Rochelle in 1372 and defeated the Portuguese at the Battle of Lisbon (1373), during the Second Fernandine War.
