= Simone Boccanegra =

Doge of Genoa (r. 1339–1345; 1356–1363)

- Scimon Boccaneigra
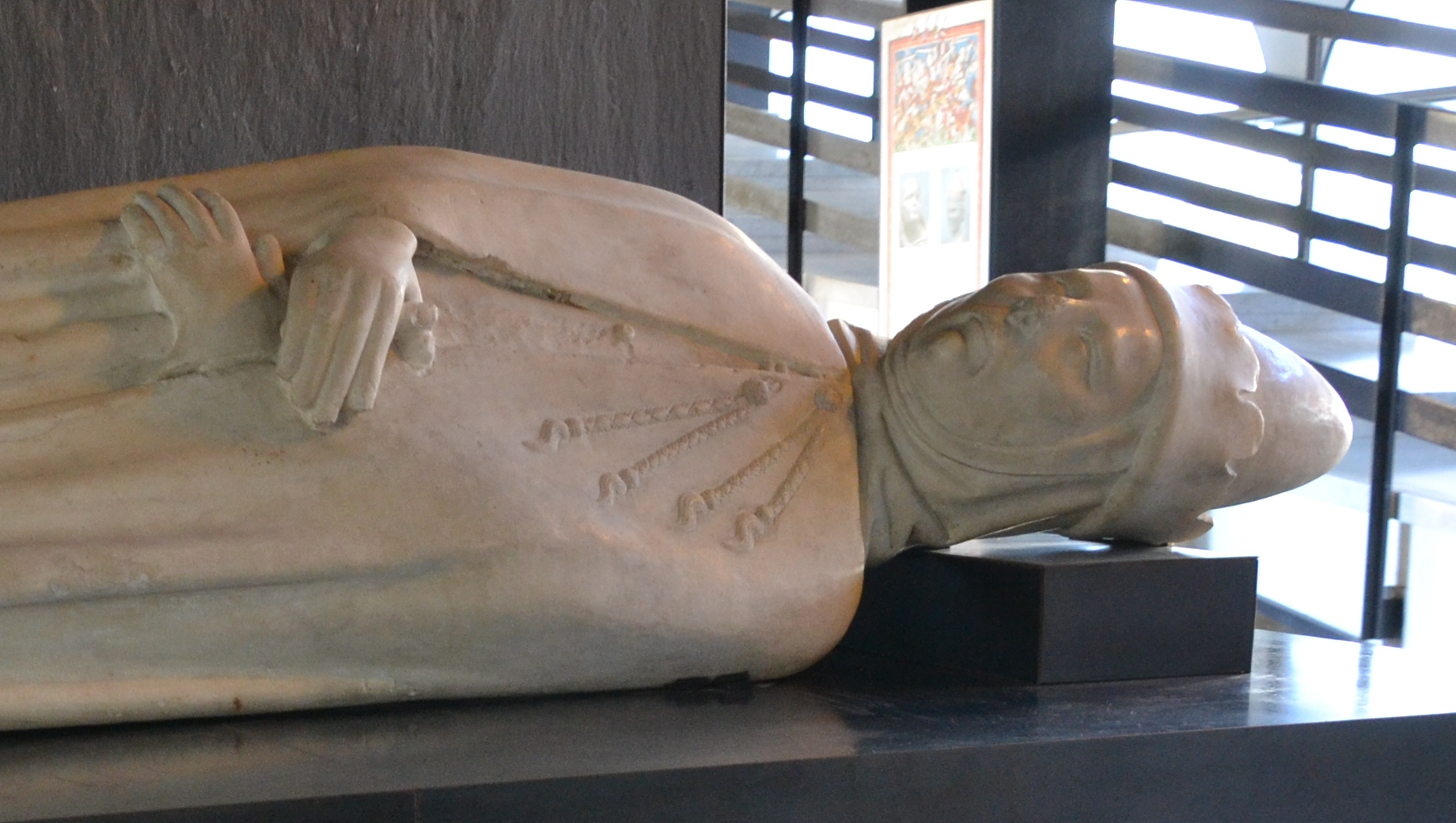

1st Lifetime Doge of the Republic of Genoa
- In office 23 December 1339 – 23 December 1345
- Preceded by: Position established
- Succeeded by: Giovanni I di Murta
- In office 15 November 1356 – 3 March 1363
- Preceded by: Position vacant
- Succeeded by: Gabriele Adorno

Personal details
- Born: 1301 Genoa, Republic of Genoa
- Died: 14 March 1363 (aged 61–62) Genoa, Republic of Genoa

Simone Boccanegra (Italian: [siˈmoːne ˌbokkaˈneːɡra]; Ligurian: Scimon Boccaneigra [ʃiˈmuŋ ˌbukːaˈnejɡɾa]; died 1363) was the first Doge of Genoa. He became doge in 1339, but was ousted from power six years later. He regained the position in 1356, retaining it until his death in 1363.

His story was popularized by Antonio García Gutiérrez's 1843 play Simón Bocanegra and Giuseppe Verdi's 1857 opera Simon Boccanegra.

== Family background ==
Simone Boccanegra belonged to the wealthy Genoese Boccanegra family of merchants, a family that had among its members Guglielmo Boccanegra, who in 1257 became a virtual ruler of the Republic of Genoa when an insurrection against the government of the old aristocracy made him gain the control of the republic. Guglielmo Boccanegra was also the commissioner, in 1260, of the building of Palazzo San Giorgio, the future seat of republican power in the republic.

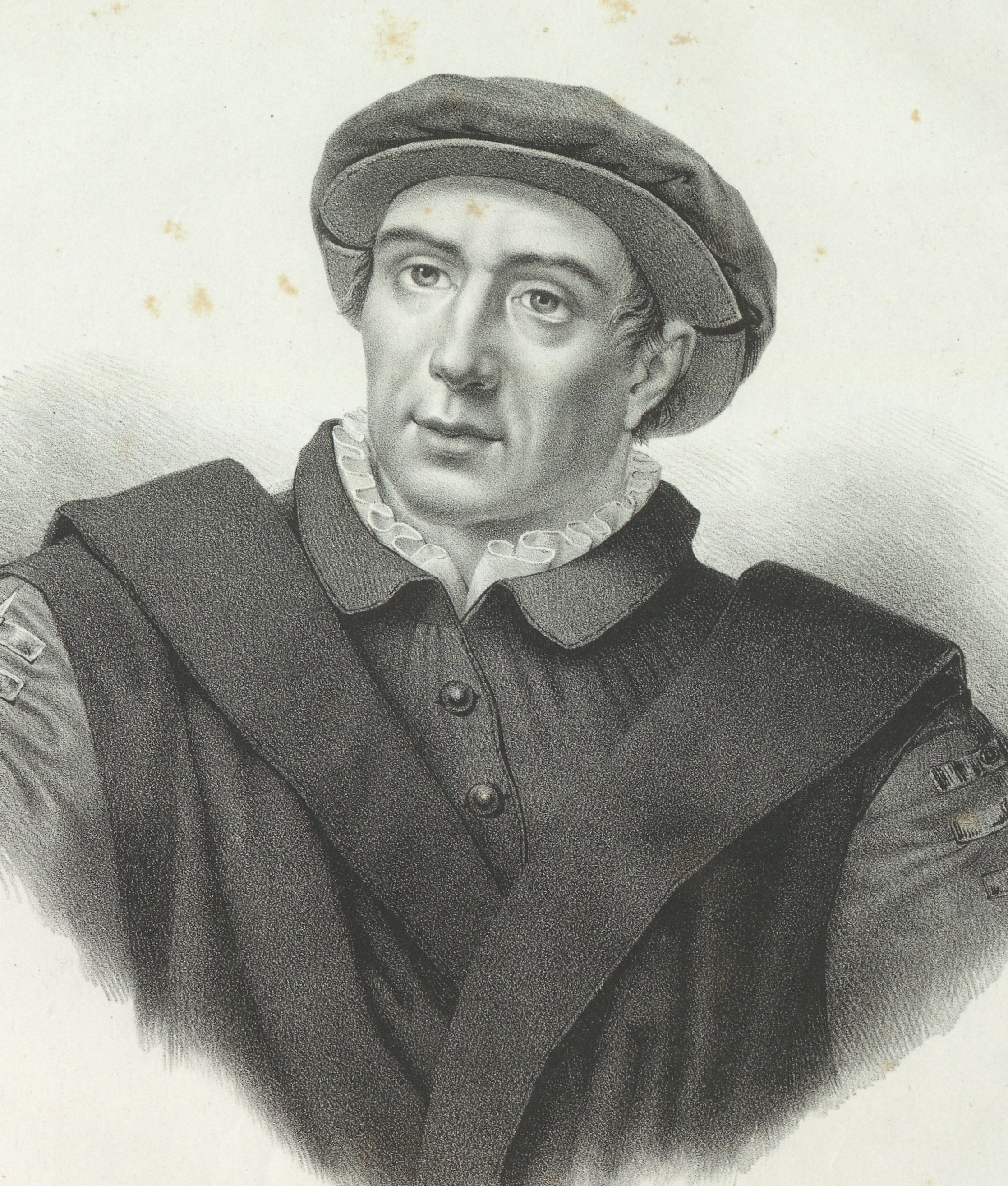
Simone Boccanegra, 19th century by Giuseppe Isola

== Life as doge ==
Boccanegra was elected doge for life on 23 December 1339. Boccanegra was opposed by the aristocratic faction, representing the old mercantile patriciate, which his first actions excluded from public life. With the old patriciate excluded from power, a new class of mercantile houses arose: Adorno, Guarco, Fregoso, and Montaldo. During Boccanegra's dogate, Genoese control was extended the length of both the French and Italian Rivieras, with the exception of the Grimaldi holdings in Monaco and Ventimiglia.

Simone's brother, Egidio, was a grand admiral in the service of Alfonso XI of Castile, and inflicted a memorable defeat on a Moroccan fleet off Algeciras in 1344.

There were constant conspiracies and even attempts against Boccanegra's life from the start. (The first conspirator's head rolled on 20 December 1339.) This led to the establishment of a bodyguard of 103 mounted soldiers. For Boccanegra's security, these were drawn from Pisa, the inveterate enemy of Genoa, where, however, Simone's brother Niccolò was "Capitano del popolo", their mother having been a Pisan aristocrat.

== Second dogeship and death ==
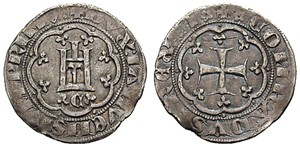
A denaro grosso ("thick penny") from the time of Simone Boccanegra

Boccanegra was forced to resign his office at a public meeting he had called on 23 December 1345. He was succeeded by Giovanni I di Murta, who died in early January 1350 and then by Giovanni II Valente, who ruled as chief magistrate. Following the defeat at the Battle of Alghero in August 1353 against the Catalans and Venetians, internal tensions in Genoa raised the spectre of renewed conflict between the Guelph and Ghibelline once more, leading to the Genoese deciding to place themselves under the rule of a foreign prince who could both protect and finance the city in its war against Venice. On 9 October 1353 Genoa submitted to Giovanni Visconti, Archbishop and Lord of Milan, while the Doge Giovanni II left the city.

Boccanegra's life during these years was spent in exile, a period of his life which is obscure. He appears to have spent most of his time in Tuscany, but he also visited Milan, where he apparently tried to ingratiate himself with the Visconti, who now ruled his native city. Regardless of these moves, when an anti-Visconti revolt broke out in Genoa on 14 November 1356, Boccanegra came to Genoa, appeared publicly at the San Siro church, and rallied the commoners to his side, thereby deciding the uprising's outcome. The pro-Visconti nobles gave up the fight, and Boccanegra was restored to the dogeship.

It was under his dogate that Genoa obtained the surrender of the ambassadors of the anti-seigneurial revolt in Corsica, of which Sambucucciu d'Alandu was a part, during the year 1358.

By 1362, Boccanegra's popularity with the commoners had begun to wane; in October and November of that year, conspiracies against him were uncovered. In January 1363, King Peter I of Cyprus came to Genoa for an official visit. The King confirmed Genoese privileges in his kingdom, and knighted Boccanegra's two-year-old son. Boccanegra died suddenly on 14 March 1363, after a banquet in honour of the King the previous evening, leading to rumours that he had been poisoned. The accounts of his death are in disagreement on the exact cause. According to the Genoese chronicler Giorgio Stella, while Boccanegra was too ill to react, a revolt overthrew the regime, his brothers were imprisoned and a new doge, Gabriele Adorno, was elected. Boccanegra was buried hastily, amid widespread odium, and without ceremony on the next day, 15 March. Other sources mention nothing of a poisoning, and Boccanegra's modern biographer Petti Balbi considers that he died a natural death; his burial at any rate seems to have been unremarkable, especially for a doge.

== In culture ==
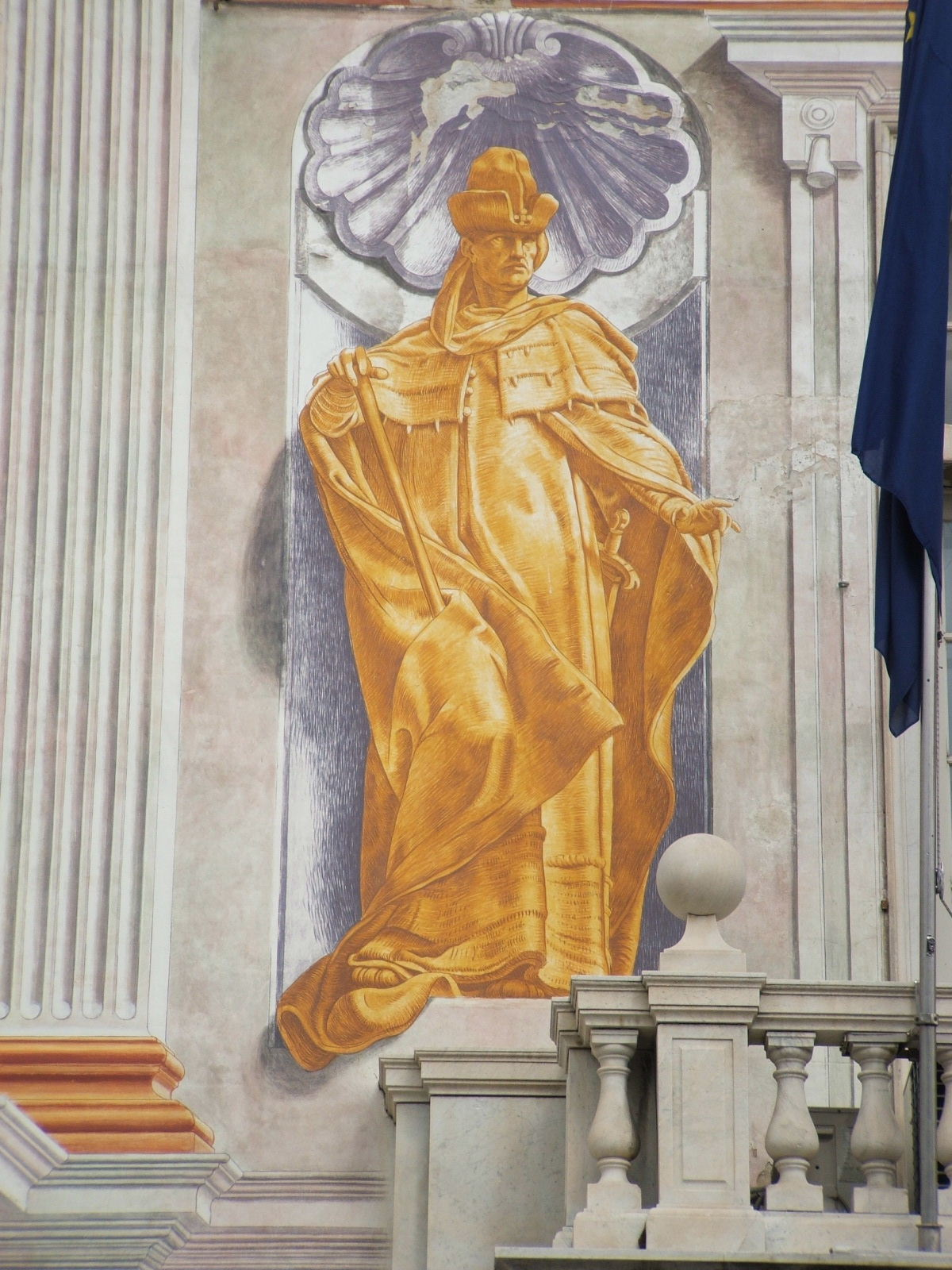
Nineteenth-century fresco probably intended to depict Simone Boccanegra, at Palazzo San Giorgio, Genoa

The humanist poet Petrarch wrote letters to the people of Genoa and to the doge of Venice appealing to them to end their fratricidal wars and find a common aim. These letters were among Verdi's inspirations for the revision of the opera in 1881.

Simone Boccanegra's tomb in the no longer extant church of San Francesco in Castelletto was decorated with a remarkable funeral sculpture, depicting him as if lying in state with extraordinary realism in his features. This sculpture is now in the Museum of Sant'Agostino.

== See also ==
- Boccanegra
- Egidio Boccanegra

== Sources ==
- Balbi, Giovanna (1969). "BOCCANEGRA, Simone". Dizionario Biografico degli Italiani (in Italian). Vol. 11: Boccadibue–Bonetti. Rome: Institute of the Italian Encyclopaedia. ISBN 978-88-12-00032-6.
- Epstein, Steven A. (1996). Genoa and the Genoese, 958–1528. Chapel Hill, N.C.: University of North Carolina Press. ISBN 978-0-8078-4992-7.
