= Suzanne Bocanegra =

American artist (b. 1957)

- Born: 1957 (age 67–68); Houston, Texas, U.S.
- Education: University of Texas (BFA), San Francisco Art Institute (MFA)
- Occupation: Artist
- Known for: Performance art, installation art, sound art, visual art
- Movement: Conceptual art
- Spouse: David Lang
- Children: 3
- Awards: Guggenheim Fellowship, Rome Prize
- Website: www.suzannebocanegra.com

Suzanne Bocanegra (born 1957) is an American artist. Her works include performance and installation art as well as visual and sound art. Her work is exhibited internationally. Bocanegra lives in New York City.

== Early life and family ==
A native of Houston, Texas, Bocanegra is an alumna of the University of Texas and the San Francisco Art Institute, from which she received a Bachelor of Fine Arts (1979) and a Master of Fine Arts (1984), respectively.

She is married to composer David Lang, with whom she has three children.

== Career ==
Solo exhibitions include those at the Gund Gallery at Kenyon College (2022), Blanton Museum of Art at the University of Texas at Austin (2021), Art Cake (2019), and The Fabric Workshop and Museum (2018).

Bocanegra's work is held in the permanent collections of the Museum of Modern Art, Museum of Fine Arts, Boston, Tang Teaching Museum, Delaware Art Museum, Museum of Fine Arts Houston, and the Solomon R. Guggenheim Museum.

Bocanegra has received a Guggenheim Fellowship (2020), Foundation for Contemporary Arts Robert Rauschenberg award (2019), and an American Academy of Arts and Letters award in art (2021). In 1991, Bocanegra received a Rome Prize for visual arts. She has received awards from the Pollock-Krasner Foundation (1988, 1990, 2003) and the New York Foundation for the Arts (1989, 1993, 2001, 2005). She has received residency fellowships from MacDowell, Yaddo, and the Sharpe-Walentas Studio Program.

=== Performances ===
In 2010, Bocanegra was asked by the Museum of Modern Art to give a slide lecture about her work. Bocanegra chose to tell the story of how she became an artist and she enlisted actor Paul Lazar to give the lecture, as her. The result was the performance "When a Priest Marries a Witch, an Artist Lecture by Suzanne Bocanegra Starring Paul Lazar." To date she has made 3 more of these performance works: "Bodycast, an Artist Lecture by Suzanne Bocanegra Starring Frances McDormand," "Farmhouse / Whorehouse, an Artist Lecture by Suzanne Bocanegra Starring Lili Taylor," and "Honor, an Artist Lecture by Suzanne Bocanegra Starring Lili Taylor."

Helen Shaw in The New Yorker writes that these are "droll multimedia talks, presented onstage before an audience, ranging across her life and art history, sometimes peering into eccentric corners of Americana. In each, Bocanegra sits to one side of the stage, at a barely lit table, as an actor does the speaking for her. Bocanegra is actually murmuring the text into a microphone, and the actor instantly transmits it, repeating what she hears via an in-ear receiver. 'Hello, I’m Suzanne Bocanegra,' each piece begins, though the person we hear might be Lili Taylor or Frances McDormand."

Bocanegra has performed these artist lectures at museums and theater festivals across the United States, including the Metropolitan Museum of Art, the Museum of Contemporary Art in Los Angeles, the Walker Art Center, and the Next Wave Festival at the Brooklyn Academy of Music.
