= Battle of Araviana =

1359 War of the Two Peters battle

Coordinates: 41°51′N 1°55′W

- Part of the War of the Two Peters
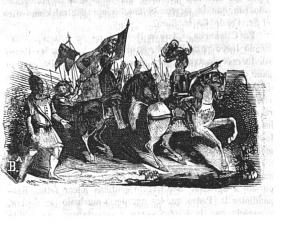
- Castilian knights and soldiers at the time of the Castilian Civil War
Date	22 September 1359
Location	Near Ágreda, Crown of Castile
Result	Victory of Henry of Trastamara and the Crown of Aragon

Belligerents
Crown of Castile	Crown of Aragon; Castilian exiles

Commanders and leaders
Juan Fernández de Henestrosa †	Henry of Trastámara

Strength
1,500 cavalry	800 cavalry

Casualties and losses
Unknown, but heavy	Unknown

The Battle of Araviana was a cavalry action fought during the War of the Two Peters on 22 September 1359. Eight hundred Aragonese horse, many of them Castilian exiles in service of the Crown of Aragon under Henry of Trastámara, had launched a cavalgada in Castilian territory when, near the Castilian town of Ágreda, confronted and routed a Castilian force under Juan Fernández de Henestrosa set to guard the frontier. Numerous Castilian noblemen and knights were killed, including Henestrosa, while many other were captured.

== Background ==
The War of the Two Peters began in 1356 when a squadron of 9 Catalan galleys under Francesc de Perellós sent by the king Peter IV of Aragon to assist the House of Valois in their succession conflict with the House of Plantagenet, captured near Sanlúcar de Barrameda two ships under the flag of the Republic of Genoa, at that time engaged in a war against the Republic of Venice and the Crown of Aragon. The king Peter I of Castile, who was present at Sanlúcar during this event, felt offended and demanded that Perellós free the Genoese vessels.

Perellós refused Peter's demands and was therefore chased by Castilian warships until the ships reached Portuguese coast. Peter of Castile complained afterwards to the king Peter IV Aragon, but as the complaint had not obtained the desired results, he declared war on the Crown of Aragon. He promptly began the operations by besieging the Valencian town of Guardamar by sea, unsuccessfully, and launching some cavalgadas through the frontier. In 1359 the Castilian fleet raided the Valencian and Catalan coasts, not obtaining satisfying results but menacing the town of Alicante. Peter IV, seeing that his southern frontier was in danger, dispatched several horse companies led by Pere de Xèrica to defend the area around Orihuela, Crevillente and Elche, and also ordered all the fortresses to be provisioned with enough ammunitions and supplies.

== Battle ==
Over the following months the action displaced to the Aragonese border with Castille. In September, Henry of Trastámara, pretender to the Castilian throne and half-brother and rival of Peter I, together with his younger brother Tello and several members of the Aragonese House of Luna, as Pedro, Juan Martínez and Fray Artal de Luna, launched a raid in Castilian territory invading the country near the town of Almazán. This force consisting of about 800 horses, encountered a considerable larger Castilian company of 1,500 horse led by the uncle of Peter I, Juan Fernández de Henestrosa. Refusing to run for cover, Henry offered battle near Ágreda. The fight that ensued was a brief affair and concluded with the routing of the Castilian force. Among those Castilians found who were killed were Juan Fernández de Henestrosa.

Other significant casualties were Gomez Suárez de Figueroa, Fernando García Duque, Pedro Bermúdez, Gonzalo Sánchez de Ulloa and Juan González de Bahabon. Many noblemen and knights such as Iñigo López de Orozco, Fernando Rodríguez de Villalobos, Juan Gómez de Bahabon, Hurtado Díaz de Mendoza and Díaz Sánchez de Porra, all of them Knights of the Band, were captured. Also the Castilian banner was taken when its bearer, Gonzalo Sánchez de Ulloa, was killed.

== Aftermath ==
Peter I was informed of the defeat of his armies at his arrival at Seville from the Valencian coast. The Aragonese armies won another victory shortly after at Tarazon, but a few months later, in the spring of 1360, Henry was defeated by Peter I himself at the so-called First Battle of Nájera. On this occasion Henry was supported by 1,200 cavalry and 2,000 cavalry, while Peter had a much larger army of 5,000 cavalry and 10,000 infantry. Though Peter won the first day he decided to withdraw and Henry was able to continue offering battle. However, Castille took the initiative and focused his operations on the southern Valencian frontier. The town of Orihuela was subsequently raided by 800 Castilian and Moor cavalry, but a relief force of 250 horse led by Count Alfons of Ribagorza and Denia dispersed them and recovered the lost ground.

== Bibliography ==
- Fernández Duro, Cesáreo (1894). La marina de Castilla desde su origen y pugna con la de Inglaterra hasta la refundición en la Armada española (in Spanish). Madrid: El. Progreso editorial.
- Montoto, José María (1847). Historia del reinado de D. Pedro Primero de Castilla, llamado El Cruel (in Spanish). Seville: Impr. de D. Cárlos Santigosa.
- Villalon, L. J. Andrew; Kagay, Donald J. (2008). The Hundred Years War (Part II). Leiden: Brill. ISBN 978-90-04-16821-3.
- Villalon, L. J. Andrew; Kagay, Donald J. (2005). The Hundred Years War: a wider focus. Leiden: Brill. ISBN 90-04-13969-9.
- Villalon, L. J. Andrew (2010). Battle-Seeking, Battle-Avoiding or perhaps just Battle-Willing? Applying the Gillingham Paradigm to Enrique II of Castile. Journal of Medieval Military History, Volumen 8. Boydell & Brewer. ISBN 978-1-84383-596-7.
