= Capitano del popolo =

Administrative title used in Italy during the Middle Ages

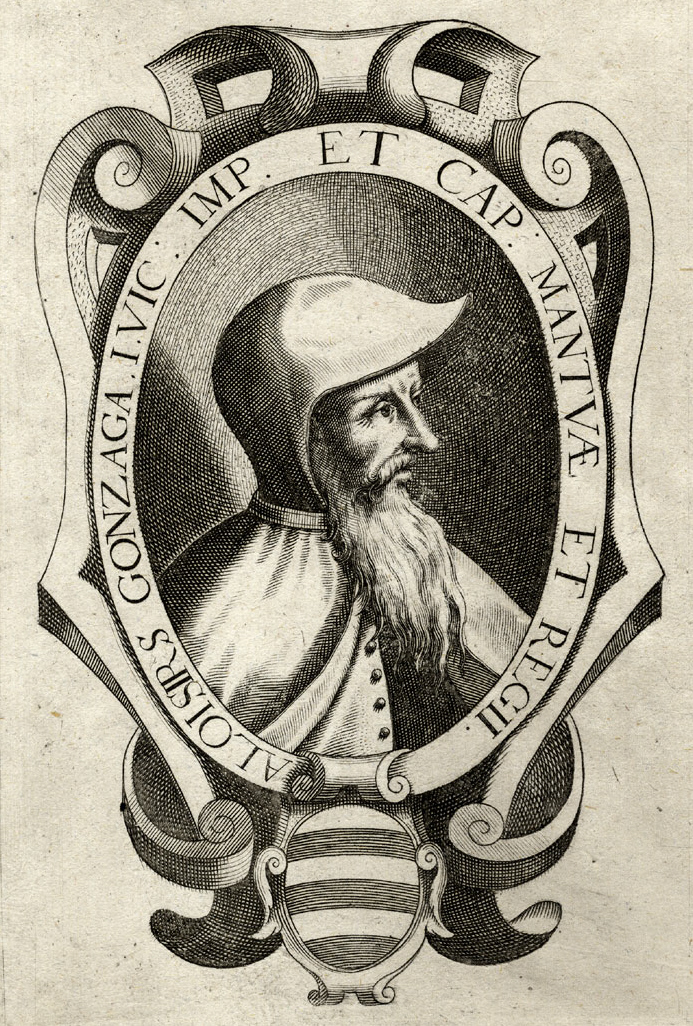
Ludovico I Gonzaga, elected in 1328 as the first capitano del popolo of the city of Mantua

Captain of the people (Italian: capitano del popolo) was an administrative title used in Italy during the Middle Ages, established by and for the popolo to check the power and authority of the noble families of the Italian city-states.

The specific details of the office, such as the length of term and powers differed from city-state to city-state, and it was formed at different times in different places.

== Context ==
In the 12^{th} century, the popolo, a class which included merchants, professionals, craftsmen, in maritime cities, ship-owners, and other such skilled laborers, began to experience a rise in power and wealth. As Italian urban centers grew in size, such laborers were given the opportunity to form various organizations, namely guilds and neighborhood associations. Guilds were formed for many professions, and they acted as political entities for their members. Neighborhood associations, for their part, provided the popolo a semblance of protection from the violence committed by nobles (called potentes).

Noble violence had, by the 13^{th} century, become endemic to Italy. Rival families built increasingly high towers in urban areas, which served as legitimately defensible structures. While violence committed by nobles typically targeted other nobles, violence against members of the popolo was not unheard of, and in the Republic of Florence, it was common knowledge that the majority of violence in the city was perpetrated by noble families.

== History ==
Conflict between nobles and the popolo grew as the popolo started to acquire roles in the communal administration of various Italian city-states. The popolo needed a municipal officeholder able to counter the political power of the nobles, represented usually by the podestà (a title used for chief magistrates and other top administrators in medieval Italian cities). One of the first capitani del popolo was created in Bologna in northern Italy, appointed in 1228.

The capitano del popolo exercised control of the podestà, sometimes flanked by two autonomous councils with representatives of local guilds of artisans and craftsmen (Italian: arti e mestieri) and the gonfalonieri, leaders of military units connected with city's parishes.

In the Republic of Florence, a capitano del popolo existed from 1250 as part of the attempt to free the city from the rule of Frederick II. The Florentine capitano del popolo assumed military and judicial responsibilities which previously had belonged to the podestà. Florentine chronicler Giovanni Villani writes that c. 1280, the capitano del popolo and his men were paid a salary of 5,800 lire di piccioli per year. This figure was higher than the salary of most other offices, but significantly lower than that of the podestà and his men, who were paid 15,240 lire di piccioli per year.

In Genoa, the popolo gained political power later than in other city-states. In 1257, Guglielmo Boccanegra, a wealthy member of the popolo, was elected capitano del popolo following a riot against the podestà at the time. As opposed to the capitano del popolo in other city-states, Boccanegra was elected for 10 years, and had the additional condition that his brother would succeed him should he die, though he was overthrown in 1262.

In Orvieto, a capitano del popolo existed from 1264 in the Council of the Popolo. The office was the most powerful in Orvieto, though the podestà presided over the Council of the Popolo and held more power on paper.

Towards the second half of the 13th century, however, the communal title of capitano del popolo became a breeding ground for despotism and hereditary lordship. By gaining control of the election process for choosing the title-holder, many influential families (including aristocrats that the establishment of this office had contributed to keeping out of power) gained control over their cities and towns of residence, thus assuring their long-lasting influence and progressively transforming the comune into a signoria (i.e. lordship).

After the rise of signorie, signori exercised control over offices including the capitano del popolo. These offices gave the signori much-needed legitimacy. The signore of Milan, Ottone Visconti was able to have his nephew appointed to the position. Villani writes that the signore of Bologna, Taddeo Pepoli, assumed the title as he came to power. In Genoa, the office of capitano del popolo gave way to that of doge. Simone Boccanegra (the grandnephew of Guglielmo Boccanegra) was elected doge in 1339, with the office fully replacing that of capitano del popolo. When a signoria was established, it weakened the mechanisms through which the popolo obtained power, namely the guilds. Taddeo Pepoli, for instance, reduced the power of guilds in Bologna by limiting many of their powers and assuming personal control of their functions.

== See also ==
- Captains Regent
- Tribune of the plebs, similar office in Republican Rome

== Bibliography ==
- Zorzi, Andrea (November 5, 2004). "The Popolo". In Najemy, John M. (ed.). Italy in the Age of the Renaissance: 1300–1550. Oxford University Press. ISBN 978-0-19-152484-4.
- Villani, Giovanni (2022). Diakité, Rala; Sneider, Matthew Thomas (eds.). The Eleventh and Twelfth Books of Giovanni Villani's New Chronicle. Research in Medieval and Early Modern Culture. Berlin: De Gruyter. ISBN 978-1-5015-1842-3.
- Epstein, Steven (1996). Genoa & the Genoese, 958-1528. Chapel Hill, N.C: University of North Carolina Press. ISBN 978-0-8078-2291-3.
- Waley, Daniel (1952). Mediaeval Orvieto: The Political History of an Italian City-State 1157-1334. Cambridge University Press.
- Najemy, John M. (2006). A History of Florence 1200–1575. Malden, MA: Blackwell Pub. ISBN 978-0-470-75487-0.
- Najemy, John M. (November 5, 2004). "Governments and Governance". In Najemy, John M. (ed.). Italy in the Age of the Renaissance: 1300–1550. Oxford University Press. ISBN 978-0-19-152484-4.
- Wickham, Chris (2015). Sleepwalking into a New World: The Emergence of Italian City Communes in the Twelfth Century. The Lawrence Stone Lectures. Princeton, NJ: Princeton University Press. ISBN 978-0-691-18114-1.
