= Battle of La Rochelle =

Medieval naval battle

- Part of the Caroline phase of the Hundred Years' War
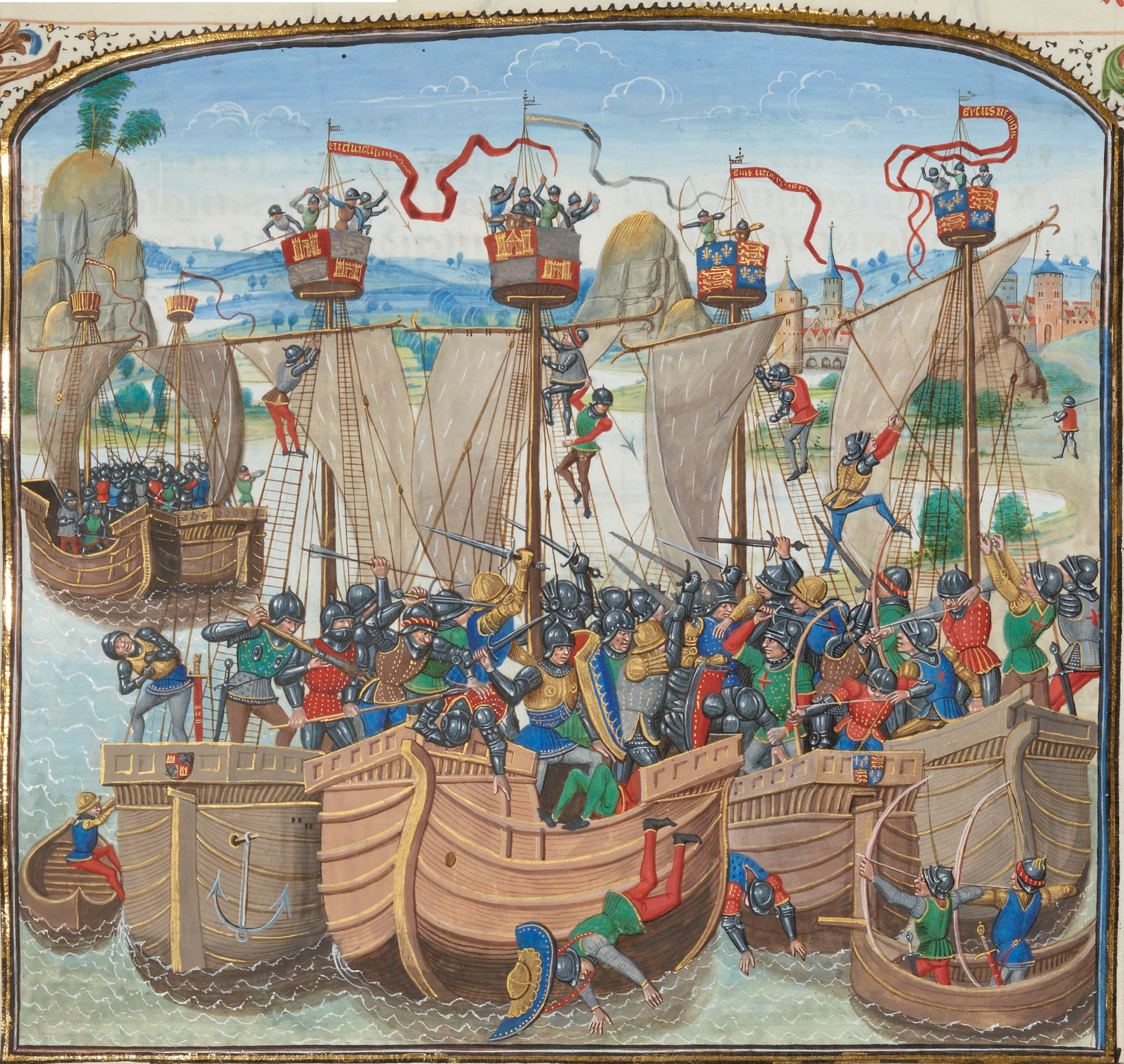
- The naval battle of La Rochelle, chronicle of Jean Froissart, 15th century.
Date	22–23 June 1372
Location	Off La Rochelle 46°09′30″N 01°13′40″W
Result	Castilian victory

Belligerents
England	Castile

Commanders and leaders
Earl of Pembroke (POW)	Ambrosio Boccanegra

Strength
14–57 ships and barges	22 ships

Casualties and losses
48 ships sunk or captured 400 knights and 8,000 soldiers captured Whole fleet sunk or captured 800 men killed Between 160 and 400 knights prisoners	Minor

The Battle of La Rochelle was fought on 22 and 23 June 1372 between a Castilian fleet commanded by the Castilian Almirant Ambrosio Boccanegra and an English fleet commanded by John Hastings, 2nd Earl of Pembroke. The Castilian fleet had been sent to attack the English at La Rochelle, which was being besieged by Castile's French allies.

Pembroke had been dispatched to the town with a small force of fewer than 200 soldiers. His ships also carried £12,000 (equivalent to £10,000,000 in 2025) in silver and instructions to use the money to recruit an army of 3,000 soldiers in Aquitaine in south-west France. The strength of the English fleet is estimated as between the 12 galleys given by the Castilian chronicler and naval captain López de Ayala and the 40 sailing ships, of which three ships were warships and 13 barges mentioned by the French chronicler Jean Froissart. Probably it consisted of 22 ships, mainly galleys and some naos (carracks) three- or four-masted ocean sailing ships. The English fleet probably consisted of 32 ships and 17 small barges of about 50 tons.

The Castilian victory was complete, and the entire English fleet was captured or destroyed. On his return to the Iberian Peninsula, Boccanegra seized another four English ships off Bordeaux. This defeat undermined English seaborne trade and supplies through the English Channel and threatened their Gascon possessions, The battle of La Rochelle was the first important and most consequential English naval defeat of the Hundred Years' War, described by prominent historians as the worst defeat ever inflicted on the English Navy.

== Background ==
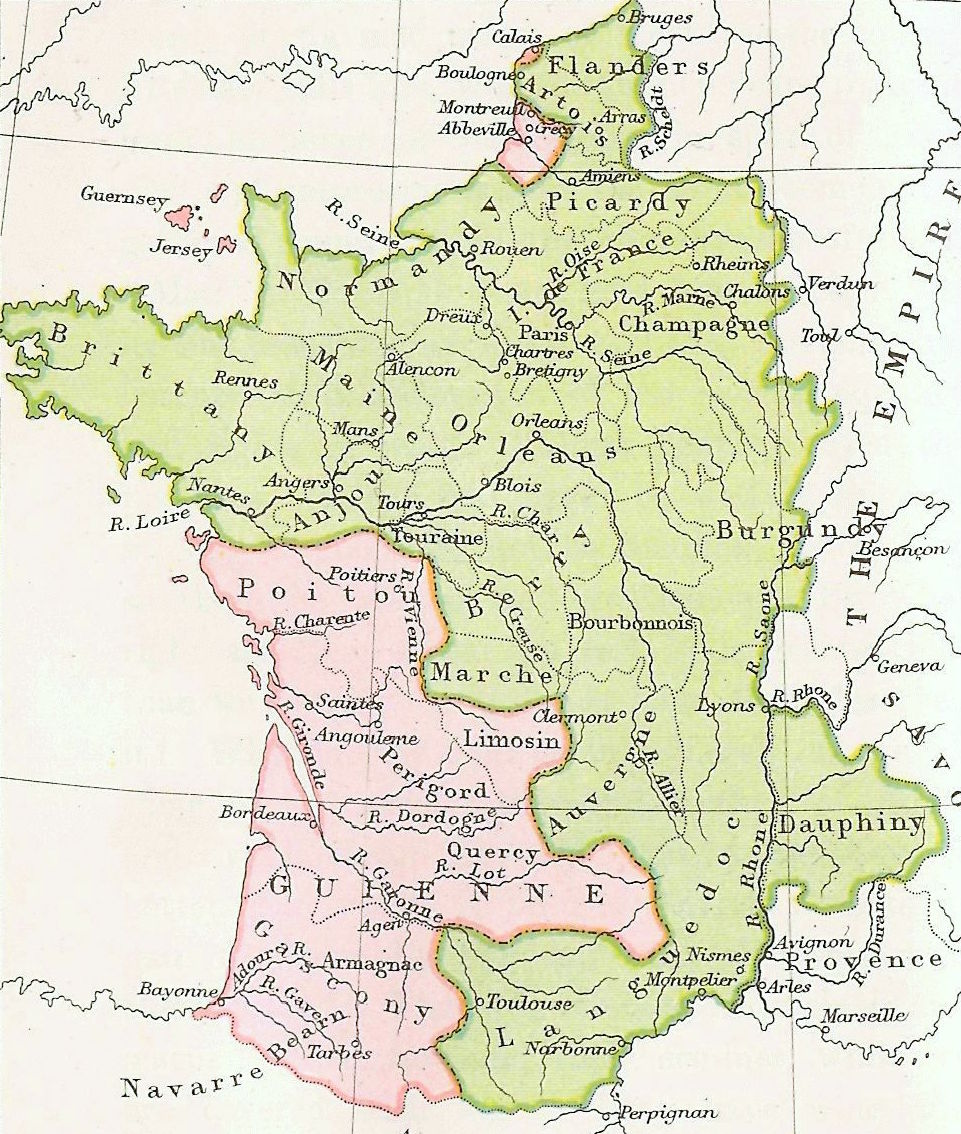
France after the Treaty of Brétigny; French territory in green, English territory in pink, in the south west and amounting to about one-quarter of France

Since the Norman Conquest of 1066, English monarchs had held titles and lands within France, the possession of which made them vassals of the kings of France. By the first quarter of the fourteenth century, the only sizeable French possession still held by the English in France was Gascony, part of Aquitaine, in the south-west. Following a series of disagreements between Philip VI of France and Edward III of England, on 24 May 1337 Philip's Great Council agreed that the lands held by Edward III in France should be taken back into Philip's hands on the grounds that Edward was in breach of his obligations as a vassal. This marked the start of the Hundred Years' War, which was to last 116 years. On 26 January 1340 Edward formally claimed the French throne. The extent to which Edward may have considered the claim more than a negotiating position is unclear.

The English campaigned frequently on the continent, gaining a long run of military successes against larger forces across France. In 1356 a large French army was decisively defeated at the Battle of Poitiers, in which King John II of France (r. 1350–1364), the son and successor of King Philip, was captured. This eventually led to peace being agreed, and the Treaty of Brétigny was signed in 1360. It ceded large parts of south-west France to England as its sovereign territory, while Edward renounced all claims to the French throne. The terms of Brétigny were meant to untangle the feudal responsibilities that had caused so much conflict, and, as far as the English were concerned, would concentrate their territory in an expanded version of Aquitaine. This had been part of the English royal estate in France since the reign of Henry II (r. 1154–1189), and by the treaty it and Poitou became fiefdoms of Edward's oldest son, Edward the Black Prince. The French were deeply unhappy with this arrangement.

In 1369, arguing that Edward had failed to observe the terms of the treaty, Charles V (r. 1364–1380), the son and heir of King John, declared war once again. France was newly resurgent; she had recently successfully intervened in the Castilian War of the Two Pedros and in 1368 concluded a treaty which emphasised Castilian naval support. This was to provide a key element in the French strategy for the next phase of the war with England. In August 1369 a French offensive attempted to recapture castles in Normandy. Men who had already won fortune and fame in earlier English campaigns were summoned from their retirements, and younger men were given commands. Events went poorly for England from the start: James Audley and John Chandos, two important English commanders, were killed in the first six months. The French, employing a Fabian strategy, made territorial gains in the south west, re-occupying the provincial capital of Poitiers and capturing many castles.

== Prelude ==
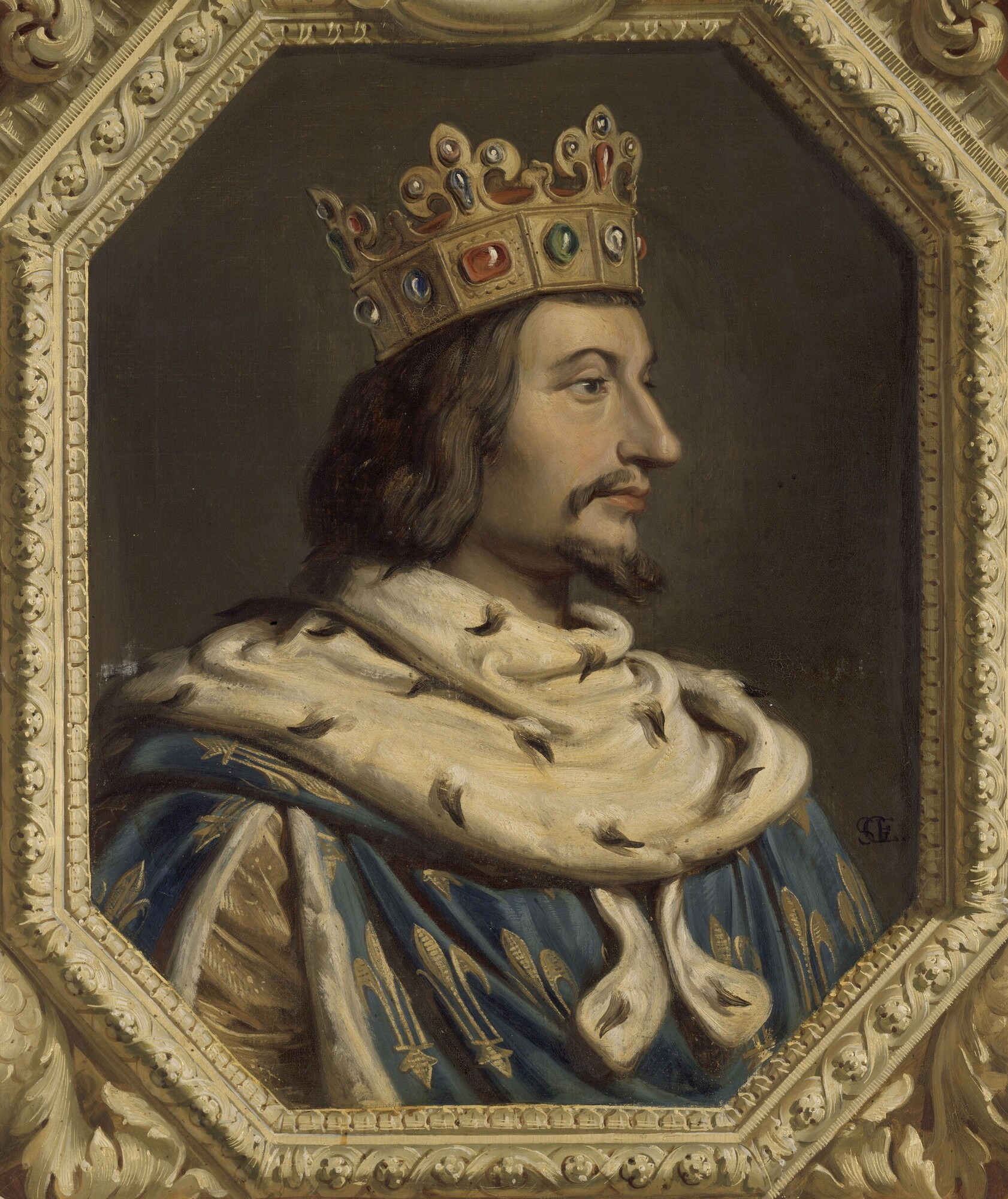
Depiction of Charles V by Gillot Saint-Evre in the 19th century

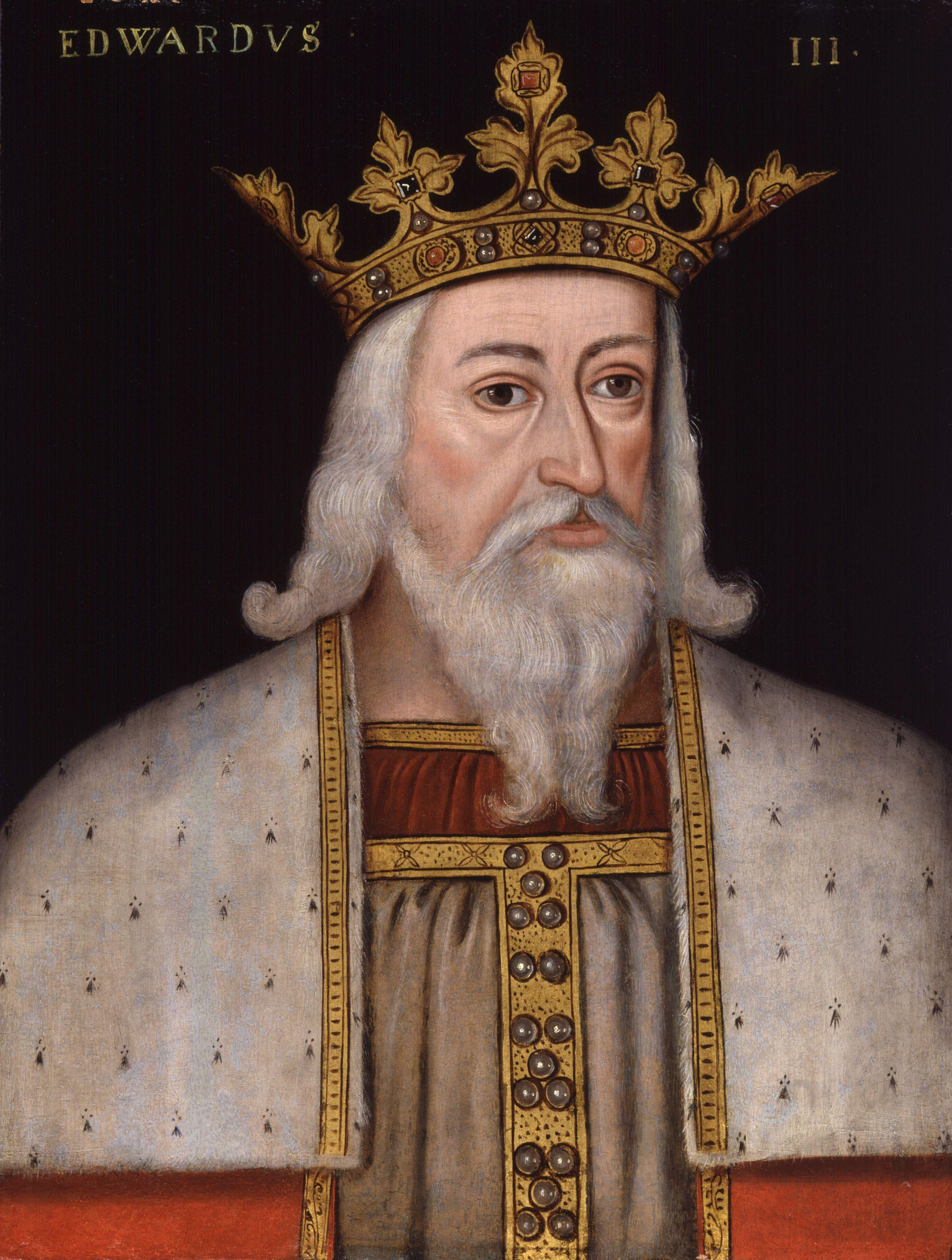
A probably 16th-century interpretation of Edward III

By 1372 invasion scares in England were common and English rule in the Duchy of Aquitaine was under threat. The duchy was particularly susceptible to attack due to its being adjacent to French territory, its difficult supply line to England, and its long and complex border. Beginning two years previously, large parts of the region had fallen under French rule; Agenais, Limousin and Beauzac had fallen in quick succession, and French incursions into Saintonge and Poitou forced England to respond. In 1372 the Constable of France, Bertrand du Guesclin, laid siege to the town of La Rochelle and called on the King of Castile, Henry II, to honour his obligations under the 1368 treaty. Henry dispatched a fleet to Aquitaine under Ambrosio Boccanegra, assisted by Cabeza de Vaca, Fernando de Peón and Rui Díaz de Rojas.

In response Edward III planned a renewed campaign in Aquitaine under the duchy's new lieutenant, John Hastings, Earl of Pembroke. On 5 March Hastings indentured with the King to serve there a year with a retinue of 24 knights, 55 squires and 80 archers. He was to be accompanied by forces under Sir John Devereux and Sir Hugh Calveley, although in the event they appear not to have served. (Note: Calverly travelled instead with another of the King's sons, John of Gaunt, Duke of Lancaster, who—having inherited a distant jure uxoris claim to the Crown of Castile through his wife Constance of Castile—was intervening in the aftermath of the Castilian Civil War. Devereaux, despite his having received advance wages, is not mentioned by English chroniclers, and the historian James Sherborne believes it was unlikely that he travelled to France.) Pembroke was issued £12,000 (equivalent to £10,000,000 in 2025) in silver coin (Note: For context, when Edward became king in 1327 his entire annual income was approximately £30,000 (equivalent to £26,000,000 in 2025).) with instructions to recruit an army of 500 knights, 1,500 esquires and 1,500 archers in France; they were to serve for at least four months. A royal clerk, John Wilton, was appointed to accompany the Earl and administer the funds. Pembroke's expedition was funded almost entirely by lay and clerical subsidies, and was one of the few 14th-century English military campaigns not to require substantial borrowing.

Pembroke's reputation was high after an earlier successful campaign in Gascony, and his campaigning style was known to be swift and decisive. His appointment indicates the government's intention to return to the tactics that had characterised English success in the earlier years of the war. The plan appears to have been for Pembroke to land at La Rochelle and give succour to Poitou and the Saintonge. Having relieved the pressure on Aquitaine and raised an army locally he would march northwards, cross the Loire and join up with the King's own army, which was to have followed that of Pembroke. (Note: Edward's army was to be much larger than Pembroke's, comprising around 3,000 men-at-arms and a similar number of archers. The fleet to transport this force was even more delayed than Pembroke's; it did not sail from Sandwich until September 1372. It was driven back the following month due to inclement weather and the expedition abandoned for the year. "[T]he king returning to port with little to show for his activities".)

Pembroke was accompanied by fewer than 200 men: his personal retinue of 160 men and a few Gascon gentry travelling with him. This small force was in Plymouth by May 1372 but sufficient ships were not available. The fleet eventually sailed in mid-June, although it was woefully inadequate for any serious military engagement. Unknown to the English, Charles VI became aware of the Earl's pending invasion shortly after it was decided upon. The English government had information that both the French and Castilian fleets were likely to be at sea, possibly operating in the area Pembroke was to sail through, but it appears that Pembroke was not informed of this and expected to encounter nothing more threatening than pirates.

== Fleets ==
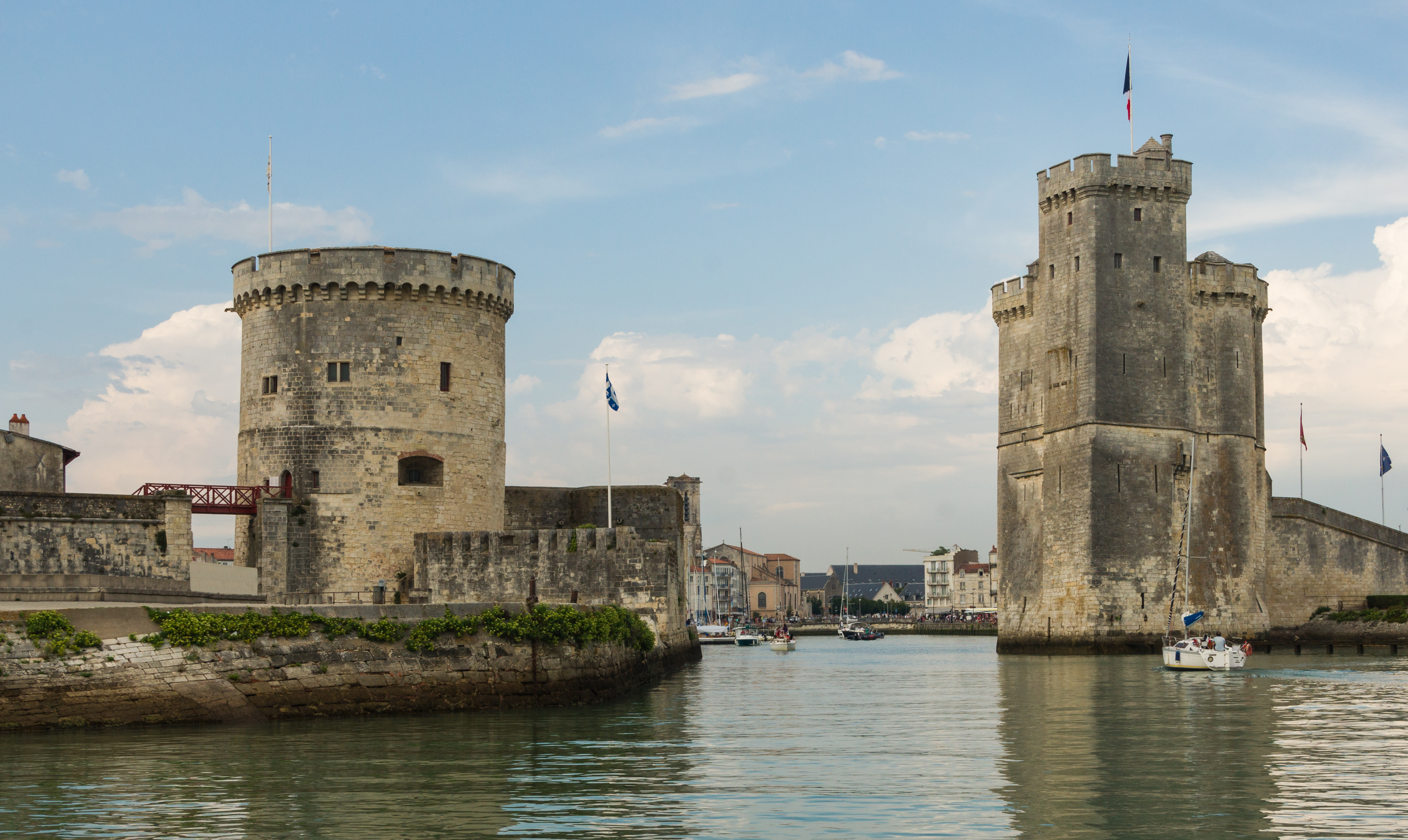
The towers guarding the entrance to La Rochelle old harbour. Erected in the late 1340s, the battle probably took place within sight of them.

Galleys had been used by the Mediterranean powers for millennia and by the 14th century had been adopted for use along the European Atlantic coast. Being shallow-draught vessels propelled by banks of oars the galleys could penetrate shallow harbours and were highly manoeuvrable, making them effective for raiding and ship-to-ship combat in meeting engagements. Operating galleys was a specialist activity, calling for highly trained crews and thus requiring a professional, full-time navy. A typical Castilian galley of the period would be crewed by 180 oarsmen, sailors and naval officers, and 40 marines.

Cogs were the commonest merchant vessels along the Atlantic coast of Europe. They had a deep draught, a round hull and were propelled by a single large sail set on a single mast amidships. Larger cogs could be converted into warships by the addition of wooden "castles" at the bow and stern and the erection of crow's nest platforms at the masthead. Cogs typically had a displacement of 20–300 long tons (20–305 t) and the larger examples were able to carry many fighting men. Their high freeboard had the potential to make them superior to oared vessels in close combat, particularly when they were fitted with castles from which arrows or bolts could be fired, or stones dropped onto enemy craft alongside. However, they were slow-moving in comparison to galleys and more difficult to manoeuvre; galleys were usually dedicated military craft, unlike cogs, and were not reliant on wind. Carracks were larger versions of cogs, made more manoeuvrable by the addition of a lateen mizzen sail and were common in the Mediterranean.

=== Opposing forces ===
The English did not have a purpose-built navy; Edward owned only three warships. The Crown largely relied on requisitioning merchant ships; mostly square-rigged cogs, the standard merchant vessels of English traders. Edward asserted the feudal right of the Crown to impress English merchant ships into service. He was required to compensate the owners, but in practice, the King paid little and late, which caused shipowners to be reluctant to answer summonses to arms. This also caused popular discontent, and in 1371 parliament had complained that thanks to government policy, the navy had been "nearly destroyed". No detailed records of the composition of the English fleet that sailed to La Rochelle have survived, but it is known that it consisted entirely of impressed merchant ships. The Admiral of the West, Philip Courtenay, was ordered to arrest ships of 50 tons or less for use as transports. These ships were too small to be effective in combat, especially as castles could not be added to such small ships; some were hired from merchants on condition that castles were not to be attached. Because of this, three larger vessels were also impressed, converted into warships, and acted as escorts.

The total number of English ships is also unclear. Ayala estimated 36 ships, a French royal chronicler 35. The French chronicler Jean Froissart suggests 14 English ships and a contemporary Flemish writer records 14 burnt and a further unknown number captured. The modern historian James Sherborne states that a total of 20, including the 3 warships, is likely but that this was "gravely inadequate for a naval engagement". There were fewer than 200 fighting men in the English fleet, a major factor in the English defeat, for in this period a fleet's strength relied on the numerical superiority of its soldiery rather than cannon.

The size of the Castilian fleet is also uncertain. According to the Castilian chronicler Pero López de Ayala, it was composed of 12 galleys, according to Froissart, 13, and Thomas Walsingham states 14. Two other contemporary sources give 20 and 22 galleys. Several Castilian vessels are known to have carried small gunpowder cannon, and it is possible that some of the English ships also did. This made La Rochelle the first naval engagement to see the employment of artillery, (Note: While Venice is traditionally supposed to have been the first power to employ naval artillery, they did not do so until 1377.) which the Castilians used to great effect. The Castilian fleet also utilised fire ships: smaller ships of various types packed with flammable material, set alight and allowed to drift towards anchored or slow-moving enemy ships. The French alliance appears to have caused some dissension in the Castilian fleet before La Rochelle, with the Castilian sailors resenting being subject to French orders; tension appears to have been alleviated by the time battle commenced. A French fleet under Owen of Wales of unknown size was intended to join the Castilians, but arrived too late to take part in the battle.

== Battle ==
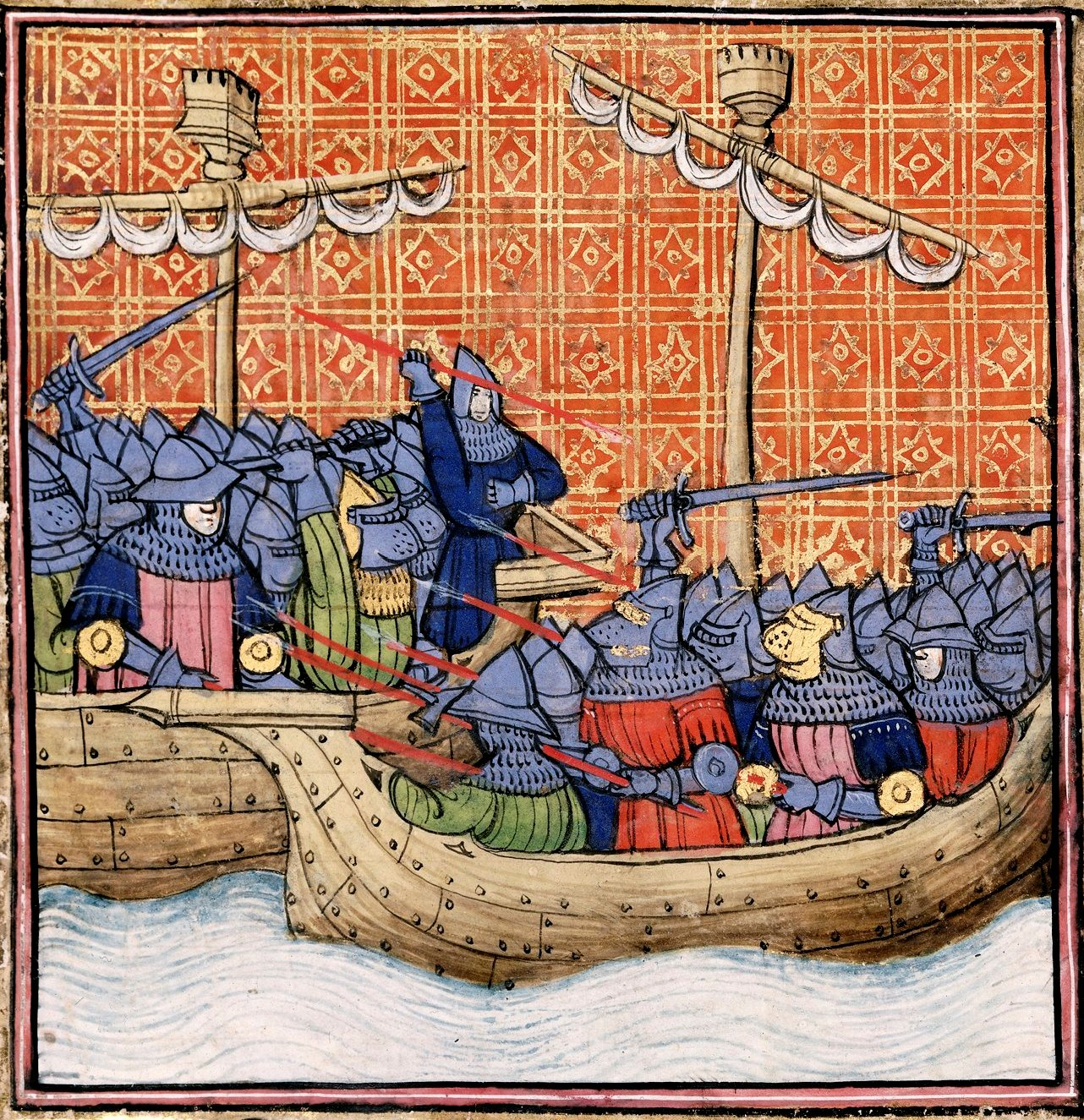
The Battle of La Rochelle as depicted in a miniature from the Chroniques de France ou St Denis, sometime after 1380. The English ships are lower than the Castilian; this allowed the latter to shower their enemy with arrows and bolts.

=== Opening engagement ===
Pembroke's fleet reached La Rochelle on the afternoon of 22 June to find the town still holding out against du Guesclin. The harbour was at the head of a coastal inlet, unnavigable at low tide. Attempting to enter the inlet, Pembroke encountered a Castilian fleet of twelve large galleys and eight carracks at anchor. They had been sent to lie in wait for the English force since Pembroke's plans had become known weeks earlier. Pembroke knighted some of his squires on his flagship; this was a common practice on the eve of what were expected to be major confrontations. The historian David Stanton suggests Pembroke attacked first, and that having been "doubtless weaned on tales of English victories at Sluys and Winchelsea, pressed the attack without hesitation". The first encounters were fiercely fought; a contemporary said the Earl and his army were "marvellously pleased ... for they did not think much of the Spanish and thought to beat them easily."

Pembroke's smaller ships were towered over by the larger carracks, and Castilian archers rained arrows onto the decks of English ships, while protected by their own wooden breastworks. Pembroke found his fleet caught between the enemy and sandbanks to the north. (Note: These sandbanks were located off what later became the modern port of La Pallice.) The Castilian ships were equipped with arbalests, which caused great destruction to the wooden decks of the English ships. Pembroke was unable to replicate the English victories of earlier naval battles such as Winchelsea and Nájera because of his paucity of archers, who would otherwise have been able to lay down suppressing fire on the enemy archers. Similarly, Castilian missile superiority meant English soldiers were unable to board the Castilian ships. However, Froissart suggests that although heavily outmanned, the English fought valiantly, putting up a resistance disproportionate to their strength. He particularly praises the archers, and the men-at-arms for highly effective lancework.

=== English defeat ===
The knights of England and Poitou that day shewed excellent proofs of chivalry and prowess. The earl fought gallantly, seeking his enemies everywhere, and did extraordinary feats of arms ... all the other knights behaved equally well.

—Froissart, Chroniques

The Earl of Pembroke, who was a good knight, put himself with his best men in his largest ships, and put to sea to fight the Spanish ... And then the English raised a hue and cry: "Go! Go! You weak Spaniard, miserable recreant!"

—Quatre Premiers Valois

The fighting broke off as night fell on the 22nd. The tide played a critical role. As it ebbed the fleets were separated, possibly the English ships grounded. The English withdrew some distance, while the Castilians anchored outside the harbour. The chronicle Quatre Premiers Valois, unlike the Spanish chronicler Pero López de Ayala or Froissart, has the anchoring sites reversed, with the English being off the town and the Castilians on the open sea. This chronicle also implies that only some skirmishing took place on the first day, with Boccanegra ordering his galleys to withdraw, reserving them for the main action. Sherborne notes that these suggestions receive "no confirmation from any other source", although Clifford Rogers argues that Quatre Premiers Valois remains a credible source.

The English had lost two ships, although Pembroke did not consider these losses severe enough to consider retreat. Froissart states that although retreat was discussed, it was considered impracticable due to the proximity of the two fleets. Likewise, the low draft of the passage made entering the harbour unobserved impossible, and using small boats would have been suicidal. Conversely, the Castilian galleys could manoeuvre freely in shallower water, giving them a tactical advantage. An additional handicap for the English was the taller air draught of the Castilian ships, which enabled their crews to build wooden breastworks and throw arrows and bolts from a higher position. The Castilian vessels were equipped with arbalests that loosed quarrels on the wooden decks of the English ships. Clearly outnumbered, Pembroke urgently requested reinforcements from the seneschal of La Rochelle, Sir John Harpeden. The townspeople were unwilling to assist, but Harpenden took four barges out to Pembroke. They made little impact on the battle, and many died in the attempt to help Pembroke.

Fighting recommenced in the morning. Pembroke's flagship was attacked by four enemy galleys; grappling hooks were used to attach them to the English ship. At some stage the decks of some English ships were doused with oil—or possibly a form of Greek fire (Note: Greek fire was an inflammable liquid which adhered to surfaces and could not be doused with water. It had originally been developed by the Byzantine Empire.)—which was then ignited by fire arrows. Fire, says Sherborne, played a vital role in the Castilian triumph, combined with weight of numbers: "Fire and arms combined to destroy the resistance of the English". Many were burned alive. Men threw themselves overboard to avoid the flames and some of the horses belowdecks broke out of their stalls and ran wild, kicking holes in the hulls. Realising that the situation was hopeless, Pembroke surrendered. All of his fleet was burned or captured, many of his retinue were killed, and those who survived were taken prisoner. Both Pembroke and his deputy, Guichard d'Angle, Earl of Huntingdon, were among those captured.

=== Casualties and criticism ===
The Spanish naval historian Cesáreo Fernández Duro claims that the English prisoners amounted to 400 knights and 8,000 soldiers, without counting the slain. Estimates in English chronicles speak of about 1,500 casualties, 800 deaths and between 160 and 400 prisoners. The £12,000 was also captured by Boccanegra. Strategically the consequences of the defeat were severe for the English, as if Pembroke had landed successfully and carried out his instructions, he may well have been able to halt the French advance through Aquitaine. After La Rochelle, this was impossible.

The English defeat seemed inevitable from the outset of the engagement due to the major imbalance in strength, and several chroniclers were critical of Edward's government for sending such an insufficient force. It is likely that the ease of passage English ships had experienced until then had created a false sense of security, even though the government was sufficiently aware of the dangers of piracy to issue repeated proclamations for sea captains to be wary. Yet royal finances were stretched in 1372, and Pembroke's expedition was a secondary offensive—the priority was a land campaign to relieve Thouars in Poitou.This makes it unsurprising that so little was spent on the navy.

=== Prisoners ===
Following his capture, Pembroke was taken to Castile, along with about 160 other survivors of the battle, 70 of them knights, and was paraded through Burgos. There he was confined to prison, where he was held, according to Ormrod, "in infamously gruesome conditions". The Spanish transported prisoners "bound with chains or cords, like dogs in leash", or, as reported at Santander, in leg irons. The treatment meted out to Pembroke and his men appalled the Castilians' French allies: Froissart wrote, of the Castilians, "they know no finer courtesy, just like the Germans". Pembroke, eventually ransomed—without the King's aid—died on his journey back to England; the chronicler Thomas Walsingham blamed Pembroke’s death squarely on his "mounstrous" treatment. (Note: Pembroke's treatment is an example of the variable conditions prisoners of war could find themselves in; by comparison, when John II of France returned from a four-year captivity in England in 1360 he needed 12 wagons to transport his goods.) The seneschal, Harpeden, was also captured; he was imprisoned for a decade before being ransomed. Release, even after a long period, was never guaranteed; Jean de Grailly, Captal de Buch, died in French captivity five years later because King Charles refused to countenance his release. Many ordinary soldiers and sailors were still in Castilian prisons into the 1380s.

== Aftermath ==
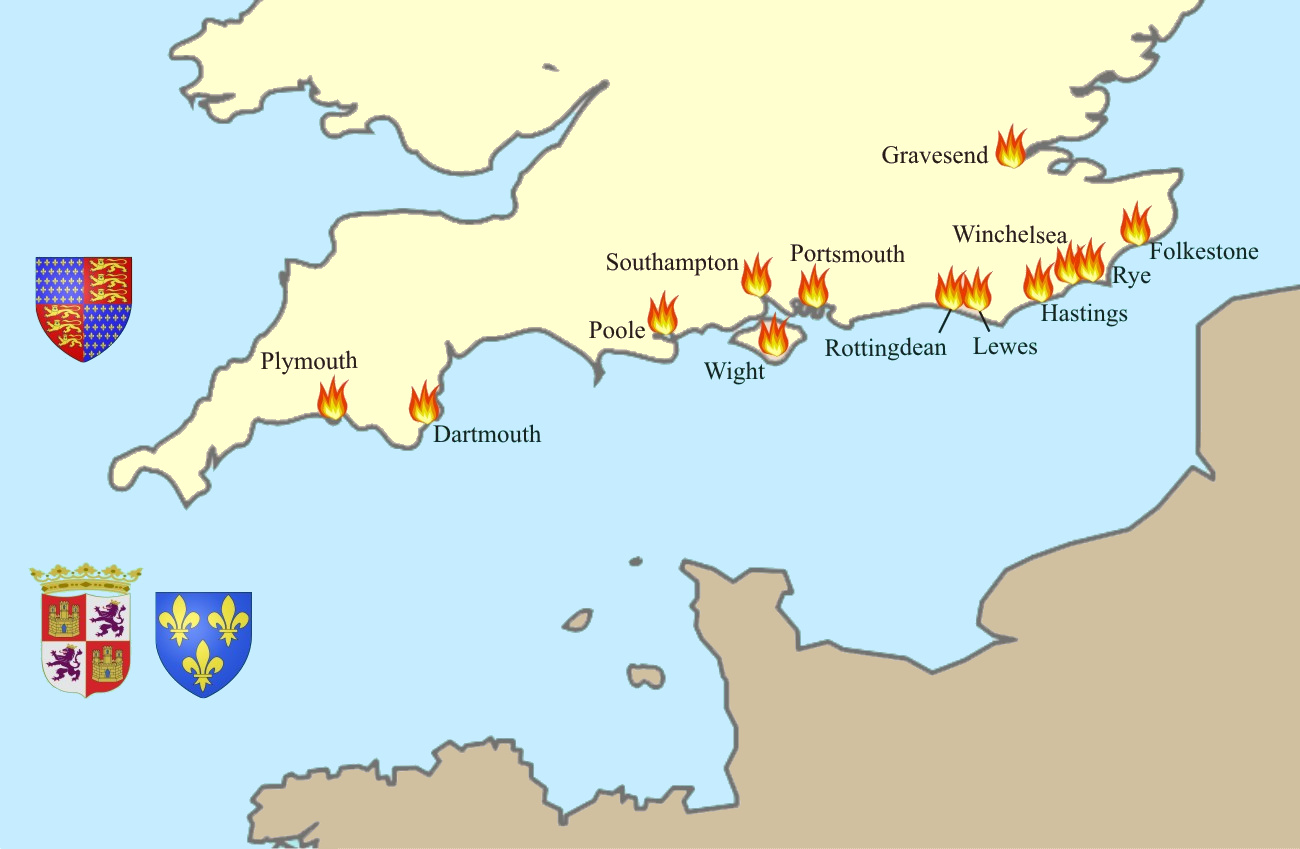
Main attacks on the south coast of England by Tovar and Vienne between 1374–1380

The battle of La Rochelle was the first important English naval defeat of the Hundred Years' War; furthermore, it was described by historian J. H. Ramsay as the worst defeat ever inflicted on the English navy, News of the defeat caused consternation in England. Its effect upon the course of the war was significant. The Castilian fleet maintained its blockade of La Rochelle, and the French eventually took the city on 7 September. This gave the French a strategically useful naval base from which to operate. From then on, France controlled the Bay of Biscay and naval dominance, allowing them to disrupt the safe passage of trade between England, Gascony and Spain. In consequence, trade could now only take place under the protection of massive escorts, and a heavy levy was placed on wine imports to pay for them. Its capture was followed during the second half of the year by nearly all of Poitou, Angoumois and Saintonge, which Bertrand du Guesclin cleared of English garrisons. Some authors claim that the battle cost England its naval supremacy along the French coast but others disagree, though asserting that England's naval policy had become misguided. Following La Rochelle, suggests Michael Prestwich, England "virtually abandoned Gascony to its own devices", and certainly lost interest in the region for several years. The projected resources to support John of Gaunt's claims to the Castilian throne were largely suspended, while a great expedition under Edward III himself had to be postponed because of contrary winds. On receiving news of the defeat, King Edward exclaimed, "God help us and Saint George! There has never been so wicked a king in France as the present one". That summer, the very thing that Pembroke's campaign had been intended to prevent now occurred. Large areas that had been loyal to Edward a few months before La Rochelle, such as Poitou, Saintonge and Angoumois, now fell swiftly to du Guesclin's forces.

The defeat encouraged Edward to order 70 new naval barges and balingers although it is unknown how many were eventually built; France, recognising that specially-designed military ships were advantageous over converted merchantmen, also commenced a major ship-building program at Rouen. The English needed a year to rebuild their fleet through the efforts of fourteen towns. The owners of three ships lost at La Rochelle received a royal ship as a replacement; Prestwich calls this "extraordinary". In April 1373 a powerful force under William de Montacute, Earl of Salisbury, set sail for Portugal. It was commanded by Admirals Neville and Courtenay in two divisions, the first consisting of 15 ships and 9 barges and the second, 12 ships and 9 barges, 44 fighting vessels all told. Other ships and barges joined the large concentration and by July, Salisbury had 56 ships crewed by 2,500 sailors and an army of 2,600 soldiers. This campaign of 1373 was successful, seeing, amongst other events, the burning of a Castilian merchant convoy at Saint-Malo. In retaliation, Fernando Sánchez de Tovar, who had succeeded Boccanegra as Major Admiral of Castile after his death in 1374, joined forces with the French admiral Jean de Vienne against England. Naval supremacy in the English channel, won in the battle of La Rochelle, allowed the allied fleet to plunder and burn the Isle of Wight and the English ports of Rye, Rottingdean, Winchelsea, Lewes, Folkestone, Plymouth, Portsmouth, Walsingham and Hastings between 1374 and 1380. These attacks may have damaged domestic morale more than the erosion of Aquitaine, which combined with growing understanding of the massive cost of these campaigns led to a decline in popular enthusiasm for the war. Local levy troops raised by the Earl of Arundel were defeated in a land battle at Lewes. In 1380 the joint fleet sailed up the Thames and set Gravesend on fire. Parliamentary pressure led to the increase in the rate of compensation—to around two shilling a tonne—paid to merchants for ships lost in royal service.

== Historiography ==
Much of the detail of the battle is now lost; only two contemporary chroniclers—Froissart and the anonymous author of the La Chronique des Quatre Premiers Valois—devote more than a few words to it; most English chronicles ignore it. (Note: For example, the York chronicler glosses over it, while calling it "the greatest loss ever suffered at sea".) Neither author was present at the battle or, indeed, had any personal experience of naval warfare, they must have received second-hand reports. They occasionally contradict each other and contain obvious errors and improbabilities, so devaluing their accounts. (Note: For example, Froissart fails to mention the burning of English ships, notwithstanding the major role fire played, while the anonymous chronicler believed Pembroke sailed out of La Rochelle harbour intentionally to engage the Castilian fleet, and that he was subsequently grounded in the harbour.) The most important consequence for the English at the time seems to have been the capture of Pembroke. Pembroke's actions at La Rochelle have long been the subject of historiographical criticism. In 1847 Harris Nicolas stated that "it was long before England could again cope with her enemies at sea", while in 1913 J. H. Ramsay described Pembroke's defeat as the worst ever inflicted on the English navy.

More recent scholarship is divided. E. F. Jacob suggests that it was a disastrous blow, and Anthony Steel argues it lost England control of the English Channel for several years. To L. J. Andrew Villalon the battle ended 30 years of English maritime superiority, while Cushway blames the defeat for a major decline in English international prestige. May McKisack says, for Castille, the battle revealed the effectiveness of its alliance with France, while for England, it was a practical demonstration of the degree to which its fleet had declined. Kagay and Villalon also argue that the intervention of Castile into the war "changed the equation", noting that the Castilian navy remained at France's command, even during the subsequent period of military inactivity that followed the 1375 truce. Rogers emphasises that it was only the "first in a series of disasters" to befall the English in Aquitaine, and similarly, George Holmes argued that the battle not only damaged England's reputation abroad but led to a growing belief that the war "both expensive and politically depressing". (Note: Naval warfare was more expensive than land warfare in this period. The 1371 campaign, estimates James Sherborne, probably cost around £15,000 (equivalent to £13,000,000 in 2025), and between 1369–1371 the cost was probably around £25,000 (equivalent to £22,000,000 in 2025), while the combined costs of Pembroke's 1372 expedition and the King's subsequent non-expedition may have been as much as £61,000 (equivalent to £53,000,000 in 2025), and the naval campaigns of 1373–1374 might have surpassed £58,000 (equivalent to £50,000,000 in 2025).) Peter Russell argued that the reputation of the Castilian fleet was established by their use of oared galleys, which he calls "the ultimate weapon of late fourteenth-century naval warfare". Russell also sees the battle as "bringing home to the English people the disadvantages of the war in which they were engaged". Albert Prince has argued against this, however, on the grounds that subsequent large expeditionary fleets indicate that Castille had not destroyed the English fleet or its passages as Pembroke's defeat has been assumed to have caused.

Mark Ormrod has also suggested that while the defeat was severe, it had the positive result of forcing a realignment of English naval policy, and a building program of new warships was instigated, and also that "to some extent Edward's lieutenants were the victims of circumstance", as they were now facing a stronger and wealthier French crown than they had ever had to. The most detailed treatment of the battle—the first since Harris Nicolas's in 1847—and its consequences was produced by James Sherborne in 1994. He argued that it was more complicated and more important in the history of naval warfare than previously suggested. He emphasised the role fire played in the English fleet's defeat, as does Prestwich, who also suggests that "in relation to Sluys, La Rochelle was no more than a minor skirmish, but it was of great importance in destroying any myths of English invincibility, and giving the French new heart".

== See also ==
- Fernando Sánchez de Tovar
- Battle of La Rochelle (1419)

== Notes, citations and sources ==
=== Sources ===
- Allmand, C. (1989). The Hundred Years' War: England and France at War, c. 1300–c. 1450. Cambridge Medieval Textbooks. Cambridge: Cambridge University Press. ISBN 978-0-52131-923-2.
- Ambühl, R. (2011). "The English Reversal of Fortunes in the 1370s and the Experience of Prisoners of War". In Curry, A.; Bell, A. R. (eds.). The Soldier Experience in the Fourteenth Century. Woodbridge: Boydell & Brewer. pp. 191–208. ISBN 978-1-84383-674-2.
- Ambühl, R. (2013). Prisoners of War in the Hundred Years War: Ransom Culture in the Late Middle Ages. Cambridge: Cambridge University Press. ISBN 978-1-10701-094-9.
- Rogers, C. (1998). "An Unknown News Bulletin from the Siege of Tournai in 1340". War in History. 5 (3): 358–366. JSTOR 26007300.
- Biggs, D. (2009). "'A Voyage, or Rather an Expedition, to Portugal': Edmund of Langley's Journey to Iberia, June/July 1381". In Rogers, C. J.; DeVries, K. S; France, J. (eds.). The Age of the Hundred Years War. The Journal of Medieval History. Vol. VII. Woodbridge: Boydell & Brewer. pp. 57–74.
- Cokayne, G. E. (1945). Gibb, V.; Doubleday, H. A.; White, G. H.; de Walden, H. (eds.). The Complete Peerage of England, Scotland, Ireland, Great Britain and the United Kingdom: Extant, Extinct, or Dormant. Vol. X (2nd ed.). London: St Catherine Press. OCLC 1000621451.
- Curry, A. (2002). The Hundred Years' War 1337–1453. Essential Histories (repr. ed.). London: Routledge. ISBN 978-1-84176-269-2.
- Cushway, G. (2011). Edward III and the War at Sea. Woodbridge: Boydell and Brewer. ISBN 978-1-78204-660-8.
- DeVries, K. R.; Smith, R. D. (2012). Medieval Military Technology. Toronto: University of Toronto Press. ISBN 978-1-44260-497-1.
- Díaz, F. J. G.; Ortega, J. M. C. (2001). "Los Almirantes del 'Siglo de Oro' de la Marina Castellana Medieval". En la España Medieval (in Spanish). 24: 311–364. ISSN 0214-3038.
- Fernández Duro, C. (2010) [1894]. La Marina de Castilla Desde su Origen y Pugna con la de Inglaterra. Historia General de España (in Spanish) (repr. ed.). Valladolid: Editorial Maxtor. ISBN 978-84-9761-781-9. OCLC 776319697.
- Fowler, K. (2001). Medieval Mercenaries: The Great Companies. Vol. I. Oxford: John Wiley & Sons. ISBN 978-0-63115-886-8.
- Friel, I. (2003). "Oars, Sails and Guns: The English and War at Sea, c. 1200-1500". In Hattendorf, J. B. & Unger, R. W. (eds.). War at Sea in the Middle Ages and the Renaissance. Rochester, NY: Boydell. pp. 69–81. ISBN 978-0-85115-903-4.
- Froissart, J. (1808). Johnes, T. (ed.). Sir John Froissart's Chronicles of England, France, Spain and the Adjoining Countries from the latter part of the reign of Edward II to the coronation of Henry IV. Vol. IV (3rd ed.). London: Longman, Hurst, Rees, and Orme. OCLC 831301633.
- Green, D. (2014). The Hundred Years War: A People's History. New Haven: Yale University Press. ISBN 978-0-300-13451-3.
- Nicolas, N. H. (1847). A History of the Royal Navy, from the Earliest Times to the Wars of the French Revolution. London: Richard Bentley. OCLC 5156582.
- Harriss, G. L. (2005). Shaping the Nation: England 1360–1461. New Oxford History of England. Oxford: Oxford University Press. ISBN 978-0-19822-816-5.
- Hattendorf, J. B.; Unger, R. W. (2003). War at Sea in the Middle Ages and the Rennaissence. Warfare in History. Woodbridge: Boydell Press. ISBN 978-0-85115-903-4.
- Hill, J. R.; Ranft, B. (2002). The Oxford Illustrated History of the Royal Navy. Oxford: Oxford University Press. ISBN 978-0-19211-675-8.
- Holmes, G. C. V. (1907). Ancient and Modern Ships. Vol. I: Wooden Sailing Ships. London: Wyman and Sons. OCLC 873361858.
- Holmes, G. (1975). The Good Parliament. London: Clarendon Press. ISBN 978-0-19822-446-4.
- Hunt, W.; Poole, R. L.; Oman, C. (1906). The History of England from the Earliest Times to the Norman Conquest. Vol. IV. London: Longmans, Green. OCLC 1110367274.
- Jack, R. I. (2004). "Hastings, John, Thirteenth Earl of Pembroke (1347–1375)". Oxford Dictionary of National Biography. doi:10.1093/ref:odnb/12580.
- Jacob, E. F. (1947). Henry V and the Invasion of France. London: Hodder & Stoughton. OCLC 657400955.
- Jones, M. (2022). "Confusion Confounded? The Contrasting Military Fortunes of Sir William Neville (d. c. 1391) and Sir William Neville of Pickhill and Rolleston (d. c. 1420)". In Bothwell, J.; Hamilton, J. S (eds.). Fourteenth Century England XII. Woodbridge: Boydell & Brewer. pp. 179–202. ISBN 978-1-80010-590-4.
- Kagay, D. J.; Villalon, L. J. A. (2021). Conflict in Fourteenth-Century Iberia: Aragon vs. Castile and the War of the Two Pedros. Leiden: Brill. ISBN 978-9-00442-505-7.
- Kedar, B. Z. (2012). "Prolegomena to a World History of Harbour and River Chains". In Gertwagen, R.; Jeffreys, E. (eds.). Shipping, Trade and Crusade in the Medieval Mediterranean: Studies in Honour of John Pryor. Abingdon: Routledge. pp. 3–38. ISBN 978-1-31705-530-3.
- Luce, S., ed. (1862). Chronique des Quatre Premiers Valois, 1327–1393. Société de l'Histoire de France. París: Vve de J. Renouard. OCLC 832201593.
- Madgearu, A. (2010). "Greek fire". In Rogers, C. (ed.). The Oxford Encyclopedia Of Medieval Warfare And Military Technology. Vol. II. New York: Oxford University Press. pp. 221–223. ISBN 978-0-19533-403-6.
- McKisack, M. (1991). The Fourteenth Century, 1307–1399. Oxford History of England (2nd ed.). Oxford: Oxford University Press. ISBN 978-0-19821-712-1.
- Mott, L. V. (2003). "Iberian Naval Power, 1000–1650". In Hattendorf, J. B. & Unger, R. W. (eds.). War at Sea in the Middle Ages and Renaissance. Woodbridge: Boydell. pp. 105–118. ISBN 978-0-85115-903-4.
- Neillands, R. (2001). The Hundred Years War (Revised ed.). London: Routledge. ISBN 978-0-41526-131-9.
- Ormrod, W. M. (1990). The Reign of Edward III. Stroud: Tempus. ISBN 978-0-75241-773-8.
- Ormrod, W. M. (2011). Edward III. Yale English Monarchs. Padstow: Yale University Press. ISBN 978-0-30011-910-7.
- Prestwich, M. (1980). The Three Edwards: War and State in England, 1272–1377. Fakenham: Weidenfeld & Nicolson. ISBN 978-0-29777-730-4.
- Prestwich, M. (1988). Edward I. Berkeley: University of California Press. ISBN 978-0-52006-266-5.
- Prestwich, M. (1996). Armies and Warfare in the Middle Ages: The English Experience. New Haven: Yale University Press. ISBN 978-0-30007-663-9.
- Prestwich, M. (2007). Plantagenet England:1225–1360. New Oxford History of England. Oxford: Oxford University Press. ISBN 978-0-19922-687-0.
- Prince, A. E. (1944). "The Payment of Army Wages in Edward III's Reign". Speculum. 19 (2): 137–60. doi:10.2307/2849068.
- Querengässer, A. (2021). Before the Military Revolution: European Warfare and the Rise of the Early Modern State 1300–1490. Oxford: Oxbow Books. ISBN 978-1-78925-672-7.
- Ramsay, J. H. (1913). Genesis of Lancaster: or, The three reigns of Edward II, Edward III, and Richard II, 1307–1399. Vol. II. Oxford: Oxford University Press. OCLC 162857283.
- Rodger, N. A. M. (2004). The Safeguard of the Sea: A Naval History of Britain. 660–1649. Vol. I. London: Penguin. ISBN 978-0-14-029724-9.
- Rogers, C. J. (1999). The Wars of Edward III: Sources and Interpretations. Woodbridge: Boydell & Brewer. ISBN 978-0-85115-646-0.
- Rogers, C. J. (2005). "Sir Thomas Dagworth in Brittany, 1346–1347: Restellou and La Roche Derrien". In Rogers, C. J. & de Vries, K. (eds.). The Journal of Medieval Military History. Vol. III. Woodbridge: Boydell Press. pp. 127–54. ISBN 978-1-84383-171-6.
- Rose, S. (1998) [1994]. "Edward III: Sluys, 1340". In Grove, E. (ed.). Great Battles of the Royal Navy: As Commemorated in the Gunroom, Britannia Royal Naval College, Dartmouth (illus. ed.). London: Arms and Armour Press. pp. 24–30. ISBN 978-1-85409-417-9.
- Rose, S. (2003). Medieval Naval Warfare, 1000-1500. Abingdon: Routledge. ISBN 978-0-41523-977-6.
- Rose, S. (2013). England's Medieval Navy 1066-1509. Montreal: McGill-Queen's University Press. ISBN 978-0-77354-322-5.
- Runyan, T. J. (2003). "Naval Power and Maritime Technology during the Hundred Years' War". In Hattendorf, J. B. & Unger, R. W. (eds.). War at Sea in the Middle Ages and Renaissance. Woodbridge: Boydell. pp. 53–68. ISBN 978-0-85115-903-4.
- Russell, P. E. (1955). The English Intervention in Spain and Portugal. Oxford: Clarendon Press. OCLC 958960110.
- Sherborne, J. W. (1977). "The Cost of English Warfare with France in the Later Fourteenth Century". Bulletin of the Institute of Historical Research. 50: 135–150. ISSN 1468-2281.
- Sherborne, J. W. (1994a). "The Battle of La Rochelle and the War at sea, 1372–75". In Tuck, J. A. (ed.). War, Politics and Culture in Fourteenth-Century England. Loughborough: Hambledon Press. pp. 41–53. ISBN 978-1-85285-086-9.
- Sherborne, J. W. (1994b). "Indentured Retinues and English Expeditions to France, 1369-80". In Tuck, J. A. (ed.). War, Politics and Culture in Fourteenth-Century England. Loughborough: Hambledon Press. pp. 29–41. ISBN 978-1-85285-086-9.
- Stanton, C. D. (2015). Medieval Maritime Warfare. Barnsley: Pen and Sword. ISBN 978-1-47385-629-5.
- Steel, A. (1962). Richard II. London: Cambridge University Press. OCLC 476572894.
- Sumption, J. (1990). The Hundred Years War: Trial by Battle. Vol. I. London: Faber & Faber. ISBN 978-0-57120-095-5.
- Sumption, J. (2004). "Angle, Guichard d', Earl of Huntingdon (c. 1308x15–1380), Soldier)". Oxford Dictionary of National Biography. doi:10.1093/ref:odnb/50124.
- Sumption, J. (2012). The Hundred Years' War: Divided Houses. Vol. III. London: Faber & Faber. ISBN 978-0-57124-012-8.
- Tuchman, B. W. (1975). "How Will History Judge Us?". Naval War College Review. 28: 3–11. ISSN 0028-1484. OCLC 1058010085.
- Vance, J. F. (2006). Encyclopedia of Prisoners of War and Internment. New York: Grey House. ISBN 978-1-59237-120-4.
- Villalon, L. J. A.; Kagay, D. J., eds. (2005). "Introduction". The Hundred Years War: Different Vistas. History of Warfare. Vol. 25 (2nd ed.). Leiden: Brill. pp. xxiii–lv. ISBN 90-04-13969-9.
- Villalon, L. J. A. (2008). "'Cut off their Heads, or I'll Cut off Yours": Castilian Strategy and Tactics in the War of the Two Pedros and the Supporting Evidence from Murcia". In Villalon, L. J. A.; Kagay, D. J. (eds.). The Hundred Years War: Different Vistas. History of Warfare. Vol. 25. Leiden: Brill. pp. 153–184. ISBN 978-9-00416-821-3.
- Villalon, L. J. A.; Kagay, D. J., eds. (2008). "Appendix I". The Hundred Years War: Different Vistas. History of Warfare. Vol. 51. Leiden: Brill. pp. 403–423. ISBN 978-9-00416-821-3.
- Villalon, A.; Kagay, D. (2017). To Win and Lose a Medieval Battle: Nájera (April 3, 1367), A Pyrrhic Victory for the Black Prince. Leiden: Brill. ISBN 978-9-00434-580-5.
- Williamson, J. A. (1944) [1931]. The Evolution of England: A Commentary on the Facts. Oxford: Clarendon Press. OCLC 984703073.
- Wagner, J. A. (2006). Encyclopedia of the Hundred Years War. Woodbridge: Greenwood. ISBN 978-0-31332-736-0.
- Warner, M. (2013). Joan of Arc: The Image of Female Heroism (new ed.). Oxford: Oxford University Press. ISBN 978-0-19963-993-9.
