= Manuel Aguirre y Monsalbe =

Spanish painter (1822–1856)

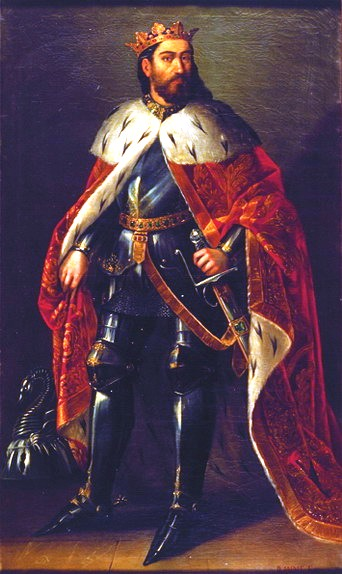
James I of Aragon, painting by Manuel Aguirre

Manuel Aguirre y Monsalbe (1822–1856) was a Spanish painter, active during the 19th century in Aragon. He was born in Málaga, and became a pupil of Vicente López y Portaña. In 1846, he became professor at the Academy of San Luis in Zaragoza. He painted a collection of portraits of the Kings of Aragon for the Casino in that city.
