= Egidio Boccanegra =

Genoese Soldier

Egidio Boccanegra was the brother of Simone Boccanegra, the first Doge of Genoa. In 1340 Egidio led a force of Genoese troops in the service of Philip VI of France in sea Battle of Sluys. Despite the almost total defeat of the French fleet in this battle, Egidio was able to withdraw his flotilla almost unscathed and then entered service the service of Alfonso XI of Castile in a war against Moroccan troops. The following year, Peter IV of Aragon appointed Egidio his admiral.

Boccanegra was executed in Seville in 1367 because of his support for Henry II of Castile.

== Sources ==
- Steven Epstein. Genoa and the Genoese. p. 207
