= Simone Guercio =

Genoese noble and military commander

Simone Guercio was a Genoese noble and military commander and official in the service of the Republic of Genoa during the third quarter of the 13th century.

== Life ==
Simone Guercio was born in the 1210s or 1220s, likely in Genoa. Although belonging to one of the leading aristocratic families in the Republic of Genoa, the name of his parents is unknown. His mother may have been a member of the Gisla family, as a certain Symonetus Guercius is recorded in a contract in 1235 with a Gisla mother.

=== Conflict with Pisa over Sardinia ===
His early life is obscure, and he is first safely attested in 1254, among the leading citizens who ratified the nomination of Enrico di Bisagno as plenipotentiary ambassador in the peace negotiations with Pisa. The negotiations failed, and war with Pisa resumed, in which Genoa was joined by Lucca and Florence. During the conflict, the Genoese supported the Judicate of Cagliari in Sardinia against Pisan domination.

In 1256, Guercio and Niccolò Cigala were named admirals of a fleet of 24 galleys sent to Cagliari to back its pro-Genoese ruler, Torchitorio V. Guercio's appointment was likely motivated in part due to his ties of kinship, due to their common descent from the Obertenghi, with the Marquis of Massa, who was also involved in Sardinian affairs. The Genoese fleet raided the Pisan port of Porto Pisano, and then made for Cagliari. On its arrival, it found Torchitorio V had recently died, and his cousin, William III, had succeeded him. In order to secure his uncertain throne, the new ruler of Cagliari made significant concessions to the Genoese, including his capital city of Santa Igia. Both William III and the city elders swore allegiance to Genoa in the presence of Guercio. These gains did not last long, however. Lucca and Florence reached separate peace agreements with Pisa, allowing the latter to focus their efforts on Sardinia. The Pisans and their local allies quickly defeated the Genoese on the island and annexed Cagliari.

=== Conflict with Venice ===
Along with other setbacks, the failure of the Sardinian enterprise opened the path for the populist regime of Guglielmo Boccanegra in Genoa (1257–1262), during which the traditional aristocracy was sidelined. Guercio disappears from the sources during this period, and is only mentioned again in 1265, commanding a fleet in the ongoing War of Saint Sabas against the Republic of Venice. In the previous year, the Genoese had scored a major success in capturing the Venetian trade convoy to the Levant, but in 1265, Guercio was unable to achieve much. Launched in May 1265, his fleet of ten galleys encountered several Venetian merchant vessels off the coast of the Kingdom of Sicily, but, respecting the neutrality of the latter, did not attack them. The Venetian trade convoy was also protected by 16 warships this time, and the Genoese did not attack them. Both fleets returned to port in November.

=== Appointment as consul in the Levant ===
Guercio is attested in Genoa in 1266, and in 1269 he was co-ambassador, along with Janella Avvocato and Simone Cancelliere, to the court of the King of Sicily, Charles I of Anjou, at Naples. With Charles' position strengthened following his victory at the Battle of Tagliacozzo, the resulting treaty, signed on 12 August 1269, transformed Genoa into a de facto satellite of the powerful Angevin ruler. This switch to the Guelph was of short duration, however, as on 28 October 1270, the Ghibelline under Oberto Spinola and Oberto Doria seized power in Genoa, and the Guelph nobles were exiled form the city. Guercio, however, was exempted from this process, and in August 1271, with the backing of the Archbishop of Genoa, he was named the Republic's plenipotentiary in the Genoese colonies in the Levant, as consul, vicecomes et capitaneus Ianuensium in Syria.

He established himself at Tyre, whose lord, Philip of Montfort, was an old Genoese ally, and where a Genoese trading colony existed. From there he took part in 1272 in the difficult negotiations with the Venetian bailo at Acre, Pietro Zeno, over the monetary sureties the Venetians owed to provide per the terms of the 1270 Peace of Cremona that ended the War of Saint Sabas.

=== Exile and return ===
In the same year, the strained relations between the Ghibelline government in Genoa and Charles of Anjou finally reached a breaking point, resulting in the outbreak of war between Genoa and Sicily. This time, Guercio was not spared. Along with his relatives, he was exiled from the city. He likely spent the next few years in Rome or Naples, where the Guelph nobles gathered.

In 1276, Guercio was a member of the Guelph delegation during the papally-mediated negotiations at Rome, between the Guelph exiles and the Ghibelline rulers of Genoa. A compromise settlement was reached which allowed the Guelphs to return to Genoa. Guercio apparently resumed his career very quickly; he is last attested on 17 August 1277 as a judge in the Genoese consulate at Acre.

The date or place of Guercio's death are unknown.

== Sources ==
- Basso, Enrico (2003). "GUERCIO, Simone". Dizionario Biografico degli Italiani, Volume 60: Grosso–Guglielmo da Forli (in Italian). Rome: Istituto dell'Enciclopedia Italiana. ISBN 978-8-81200032-6.
- Caro, Georg (1895). Genua und die Mächte am Mittelmeer 1257–1311. Ein Beitrag zur Geschichte des XIII. Jahrhunderts. Erster Band [Genoa and the Powers of the Mediterranean 1257–1311. Contribution to the History of the 13th Century. First Volume.] (in German). Halle a. S.: Max Niemeyer. OCLC 457285419.
- Manfroni, Camillo (1902). Storia della marina italiana, dal Trattato di Ninfeo alla caduta di Constantinopoli (1261–1453) [History of the Italian Navy, from the Treaty of Nymphaeum to the Fall of Constantinople (1261–1453)] (in Italian). Livorno: R. Accademia navale. OCLC 265927738.
