= Andrea Barozzi =

Venetian military commander

Andrea Barozzi (fl. 1252–1278) was a Venetian nobleman. He served as official and military commander for the Venetian Republic.

== Life ==
Andrea was the firstborn son of Iacopo Barozzi, a Venetian official who was duke of Candia c. 1244. Beginning with Karl Hopf in the 19th century, several modern historians held that Andrea's father had seized the Aegean islands of Santorini and Therasia following the Fourth Crusade, meaning that Andrea was the second lord of the island following his father's death c. 1245, but this has been refuted in the later 1960s, when it was shown that Barozzi rule over Santorini can be documented only from the early 14th century on.

In 1252, the Venetian authorities ceded Andrea Barozzi two knightly fiefs in the Venetian colony of Crete. In 1258–59 he held the high office of Bailo of Negroponte. At that time, he negotiated a treaty to end the War of the Euboeote Succession, between the Triarchs of Negroponte, who had been backed by Venice, and William II of Villehardouin, the Prince of Achaea. Shortly before, when military operations were favorable to Villehardouin, Barozzi tried to change the course of the war, in an overwhelming victory in a battle near Chalcis and trying in vain to besiege Oreoi. Barozzi also renewed the 1256 treaty with the Triarchs in terms advantageous to Venice.

In 1264, he was placed in command of a fleet of c. 50 ships to prevent the Genoese from raiding the annual trade convoy to the Levant. He was tricked, however, by the Genoese commander, Simone Grillo: Grillo spread rumours that he intended to head due east to the Levant, whereas in reality he took up station at Malta. When Barozzi took the bait and moved east to pursue Grillo with his much larger fleet, the latter was free to attack the Venetian convoy off Saseno, and capture it almost in its entirety; only the giant merchant ship Roccafortis escaped. In the meantime, Barozzi was pressing on eastwards, searching in vain for Grillo's fleet. Arriving before Tyre on 2 September, he encountered a Genoese merchantman carrying 11,000 bezants worth of silk, the Oliva, in the harbour. With the Genoese fleet nowhere in sight, Barozzi resolved to seize the ship, despite the warnings of the city's lord, Philip of Montfort, a Genoese ally, that he would confiscate double the amount in Venetian properties if they did so. Barozzi did not hesitate long: he not only captured the Oliva, but also began a siege of Tyre itself, in the hopes of depriving Genoa of access to this, the second-most important port city of the Levant. The Venetians had to interrupt the siege after a few days, however, when news of the events at Saseno reached them. Instead, Barozzi hurried to Acre to escort the previous year's returning convoy back to Venice.

Andrea Barozzi is attested for the last time in 1278, and likely died soon after.

== Sources ==
- Borsari, Silvano (1964). "BAROZZI, Andrea". Dizionario Biografico degli Italiani (in Italian). Vol. 6: Baratteri–Bartolozzi. Rome: Institute of the Italian Encyclopaedia. OCLC 883370.
- Borsari, Silvano (1966). Studi sulle colonie veneziane in Romania nel XIII secolo (in Italian). Naples: Università di Napoli.
- Dotson, John E. (1999). "Fleet Operations in the First Genoese-Venetian War, 1264-1266". Viator. Medieval and Renaissance Studies. 30: 165–180. doi:10.1484/J.VIATOR.2.300833. ISSN 0083-5897.
- Manfroni, Camillo (1902). Storia della marina italiana, dal Trattato di Ninfeo alla caduta di Constantinopoli (1261–1453) [History of the Italian Navy, from the Treaty of Nymphaeum to the Fall of Constantinople (1261–1453)] (in Italian). Livorno: R. Accademia navale. OCLC 265927738.
- Robbert, Louise Buenger (1985). "Venice and the Crusades". In Setton, Kenneth M.; Zacour, Norman P.; Hazard, Harry W. (eds.). A History of the Crusades, Volume V: The Impact of the Crusades on the Near East. Vol. 5. Madison and London: University of Wisconsin Press. pp. 379–451. ISBN 0-299-09140-6.
- Setton, Kenneth M. (1976). The Papacy and the Levant (1204–1571), Volume I: The Thirteenth and Fourteenth Centuries. Vol. 1. Philadelphia: The American Philosophical Society. ISBN 0-87169-114-0.
