= Battle of Trapani =

1266 battle of the War of Saint Sabas

- Part of the War of Saint Sabas
- Map of the fleet movements prior to the Battle of Trapani
Date	23 June 1266
Location	Off Trapani, Sicily 38°1′30″N 12°30′36″E
Result	Venetian victory

Belligerents
Republic of Venice	Republic of Genoa

Commanders and leaders
Jacopo Dondulo; Marco Gradenigo	Lanfranco Borbonino

Strength
24 galleys; 2 saette scouting galleys	27 galleys

Casualties and losses
Light	24 galleys captured; 3 galleys destroyed; many crewmen killed, including 1,200 drowned; 600 crewmen captured

The Battle of Trapani was a naval battle that took place on 23 June 1266 off Trapani, Sicily, between the fleets of the Republic of Genoa and the Republic of Venice, as part of the War of Saint Sabas (1256–1270). During the war, the Venetians held the upper hand in naval confrontations, forcing the Genoese to resort to commerce raiding and avoiding fleet battles. In the 1266 campaign, the Genoese had an advantage in numbers, but this was not known to the Genoese commander, Lanfranco Borbonino. As a result, the Genoese tarried at Corsica until the end of May. The Venetian fleet under Jacopo Dondulo was left to sail back and forth, awaiting the appearance of the Genoese fleet in the waters around southern Italy and Sicily. Fearing that the other side had more ships, both sides reinforced their fleets with additional ships, but the Genoese retained a small numerical advantage.

The two fleets met near Trapani in Sicily on 22 June. After learning of the Venetian fleet's smaller size, the Genoese war council resolved to attack, but during the night Borbonino reversed the decision and instead ordered his ships to take up a defensive position, bound together with chains, near the shore. As the Venetian fleet attacked the next day, many of the Genoese crews, mostly hired foreigners, lost heart and abandoned their ships. The battle was a crushing Venetian victory, as they sank or captured the entire Genoese fleet. On their return to Genoa, Borbonino and most of his captains were tried and fined large sums for cowardice. Despite the loss, Genoa continued the war, in which neither side was able to gain a decisive advantage, until it was ended through French mediation in 1270.

== Background ==
The War of Saint Sabas between the rival Italian maritime republics of Venice and Genoa broke out in 1256 over access to and control of the ports and markets of the Eastern Mediterranean. In the Battle of Acre in 1258 and again in the Battle of Settepozzi in 1263, the Venetian navy demonstrated its superiority over its Genoese counterpart. Consequently, the Genoese avoided direct confrontations with the Venetian battle fleet. Instead, they engaged in commerce raiding against the Venetian merchant convoys. This type of warfare is exemplified by the Battle of Saseno in August 1264, when the annual Venetian trade convoy (muda) to the Levant was captured by the Genoese.

At the same time, the Venetians' diplomatic position improved, as the Byzantine emperor, Michael VIII Palaiologos, broke his treaty of alliance with Genoa as a result of the poor Genoese performance against Venice. In 1264, he expelled the Genoese from Constantinople and sought a rapprochement with Venice that culminated in a provisional non-aggression pact in 1265, although it was not ratified until three years later. 1265 saw no major combat at sea and the Venetian fleet of 16 galleys under the admiral Giovanni Delfino successfully escorted the year's trade convoy to the Levant and back to Venice. The Genoese fleet of ten galleys, under the prominent nobleman Simone Guercio, had tarried in sailing until the Venetians were already back in the Adriatic Sea. According to the naval historian Camillo Manfroni, there were two reasons why warfare was conducted in such an almost desultory manner: both sides faced severe financial shortages, and furthermore, were confronted with the landing in Italy of the ambitious French prince, Charles of Anjou, leading both naval powers to adopt a cautious stance.

== Opening moves ==
For the 1266 raiding campaign, Genoa prepared a fleet comprising 18 galleys and a large nave (Note: A nave, plural navi, was a type of large, broad-beamed cargo vessel equipped with lateen sails. Due to their size, high sides, and capacity to carry hundreds of marines, and even siege engines, they were almost impossible to defeat in battle except by another nave.) under Lanfranco Borbonino. As the fleet departed for Corsica in late April, news arrived of increased Venetian naval strength, and nine more galleys were ordered into action; they joined the rest of the fleet at Bonifacio in May.

In reality, the Venetian fleet only counted 15 galleys according to the Venetian chronicler Martino da Canal (the Genoese Annali Genovesi report only ten). Jacopo Dondulo (often erroneously called Dandolo), an experienced sailor who was said to "know the harbours and holes where the Genoese lay in hiding", was appointed as its commander. Due to financial constraints, the bulk of the fleet was to be furnished by the Venetian colonies—four galleys from Crete, three galleys from Zara, and three galleys and a galleot (a type of light galley) from Negroponte—while only four galleys were equipped in Venice itself.

Dondulo led his fleet to Tunis, where they captured a Genoese ship in a night attack, removed its crew and cargo, and burned it. The next day, a small merchant vessel from Savona was likewise captured. On the way back to Messina, the Venetians encountered and defeated a pirate squadron of two galleys and a saetta (Note: A saetta, plural saette, was a type of smaller and narrower galley, with only one oarsman per bench rather than two or three, optimized for speed rather than carrying capacity.) from the Genoese port of Porto Venere, capturing one of the galleys with most of its crew.

The Venetians may have hoped to encounter the Genoese battle fleet at or near the Straits of Messina, but luckily for them, given the actual strength of the two fleets, the Genoese remained at Bonifacio. The Venetians, after unloading their booty at Messina, set sail for Venice. In the meantime, news had reached Venice of the large Genoese fleet, and a further 10 galleys under the veteran commander Marco Gradenigo had been dispatched to join Dondulo. The two squadrons met at Ragusa, and their commanders decided to return to Sicily to search for the Genoese fleet. Faced with the apparent inactivity of the Genoese, which recalled the previous year, many of the Venetian patricians serving with the fleet were growing anxious to leave so that they could participate in the summer trade convoy which would soon depart for the Levant, so the Venetian fleet had to stop at Apulia—likely at Gallipoli—and allow them to disembark and make their way to Venice overland.

== Battle ==
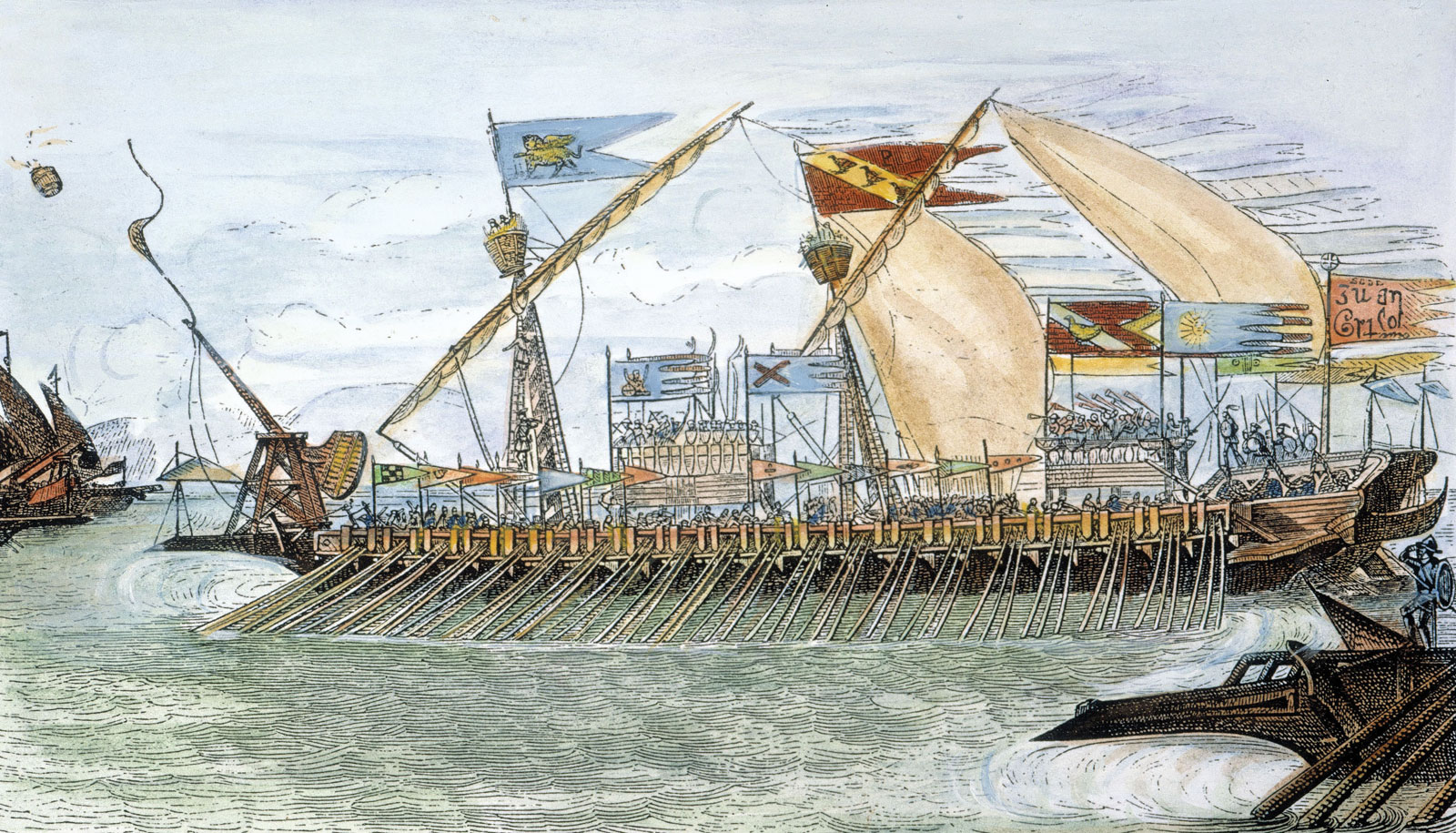
A 13th-century Venetian galley, woodcut by Quinto Cenni

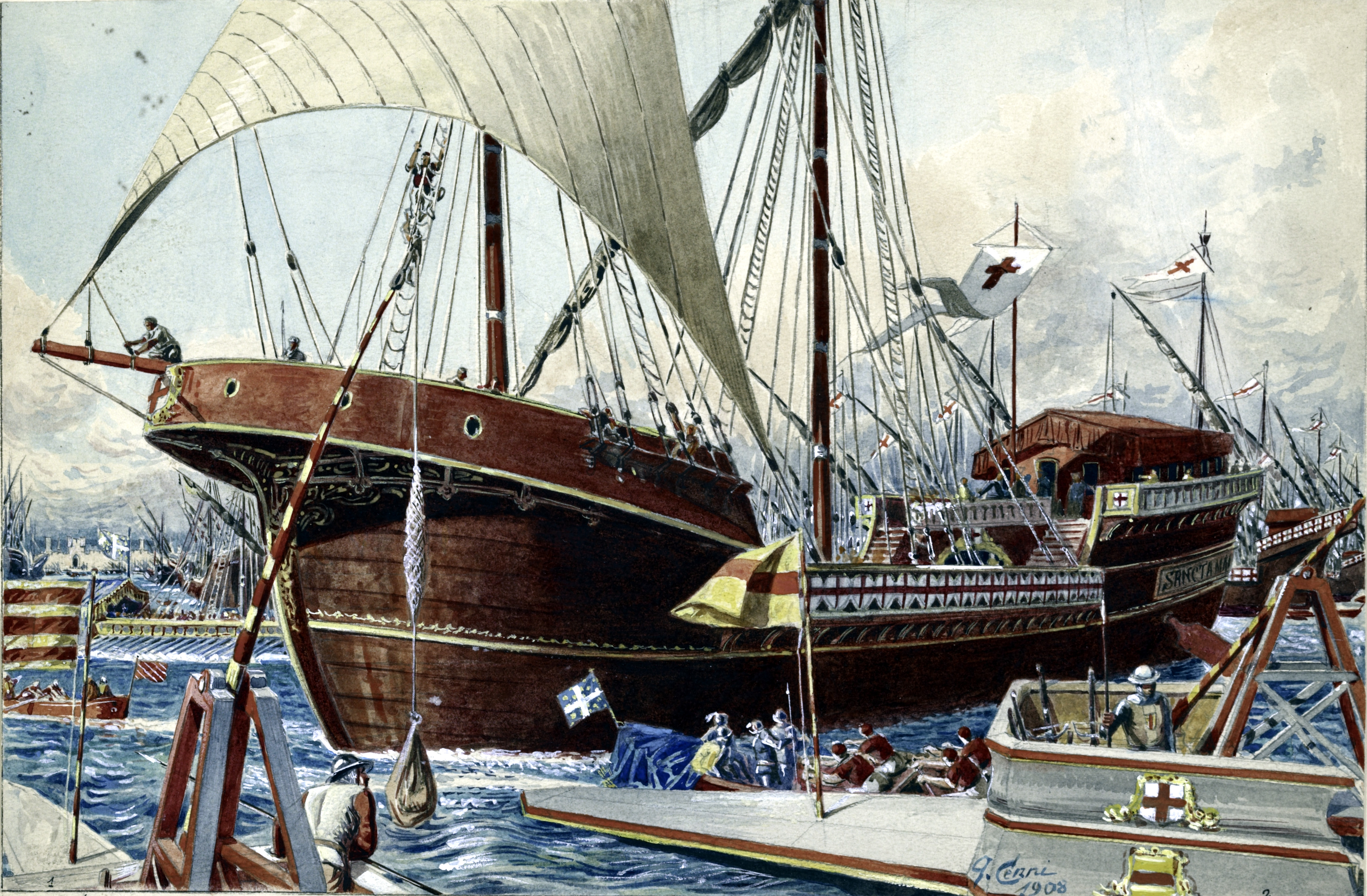
A Genoese nave, painting by Quinto Cenni

In the meantime, Borbonino received reports that the Venetians had assembled 30 galleys or even more, though in reality he had a slight numerical advantage. As a result, he decided to abandon the nave, and distribute its crew to the other vessels to enhance their combat strength. In early June, Borbonino led his fleet out of Bonifacio to confront the Venetians. On 22 June, the Genoese were at Trapani, when they received intelligence that the Venetian fleet was at Marsala nearby, and that it was smaller than Borbonino had feared. (Note: According to the Annali Genovesi, the Venetian fleet numbered 24 galleys and two saette.) Borbonino convened a council of war, comprising the three councillors appointed to advise the fleet commander, and all the galley captains. The Genoese captains did not trust their crews, many of whom, according to the sources, were Lombards and other foreigners hired as substitutes by Genoese citizens eager to avoid the hardships and dangers of rowing in a war galley. As a result, the council resolved to attack the Venetians from the direction of the open sea, so that the crews would not be tempted to abandon their posts and swim for the shore.

However, shortly afterwards, Borbonino decided otherwise. Possibly influenced by previous Venetian victories in open combat, he decided to adopt a purely defensive position, chaining his ships together, with their sterns turned to the safety of the shore, and their prows directed seaward. This tactic offered many advantages to the defender, especially, according to historian John Dotson, "in the face of a more skillful, aggressive opponent": it ensured that his fleet would not be flanked or split apart, and that reinforcements could be quickly moved to any threatened ship. On the other hand, it presupposed that the defenders would possess discipline and steadfastness. To further bolster his crews, Borbonino hired large numbers of local Trapanese, offering them one gold agostaro coin per day.

Borbonino's order was carried out during the night, and when, next day, the Venetian fleet arrived at Trapani, they found the Genoese galleys bound and chained together. Taking this as a sign of poor morale among their opponents, and despite the contrary wind, the Venetians eagerly advanced upon the Genoese, raising loud shouts to further discourage them. Twice the Venetian attempts to break the Genoese line failed, but on the third attempt they succeeded in detaching three Genoese galleys from the main body. The Genoese had tried to counter the Venetian attacks by setting a burning raft adrift against their enemy's ships, but when they saw the Venetian success, panic began to spread among the Genoese crews. Already disheartened by their commander's apparent lack of confidence, the Genoese began to abandon their ships and swim ashore to safety, so that in the end the Venetians were able to capture all 27 Genoese galleys, as well as those of the crew who remained behind. The Venetians towed 24 of the captured galleys away, while three were burned on the spot. Many Genoese were killed, including some 1,200 drowned; 600 were taken captive.

== Aftermath ==
Borbonino and his officers were able to escape, but once the news of the battle arrived in Genoa, they were tried for cowardice and incompetence. On 25 July, all except for five of the galley captains were found guilty, and sentenced to confiscation of their goods and banishment, which could only be lifted after paying heavy fines. Borbonino was sentenced to a fine of 10,000 Genoese pounds to lift his banishment, his councillors—Rinaldo Cebà and Bonavia Conte da Noli are named—to 3,000 (or 2,000, according to the Annali Genovesi) pounds, and the galley captains—only one, Ogerio Vacca, is named—1,000 pounds. All were likewise condemned to recompense the Republic for its expenses in equipping the fleet. Indeed, while da Canal provides a vivid and detailed account of the battle, the Annali Genovesi simply report that the Genoese crews abandoned their ships, almost as soon as the Venetians were sighted. Manfroni comments that the Genoese government and its chronicler were probably eager to put the entire blame of the defeat on Borbonino's shoulders and excuse the disaster through his supposed cowardice.

On the Venetian side, Dondulo was acclaimed a hero on his return to Venice in July, towing the captured ships, and was duly elected as Captain General of the Sea, Venice's highest naval command position. He soon fell out with Doge Reniero Zeno, however: the Doge insisted that the fleet restrict itself to escorting the merchant convoys, whereas Dondulo strongly supported the idea that the fleet should, rather than return to Venice once the convoys were safely under way, remain at sea seeking to attack Genoese shipping. As a result of this disagreement, Dondulo resigned and was replaced by his lieutenant, Marco Zeno.

The Venetian triumph at Trapani did not immediately affect the course of the war. Genoa was still capable of quickly replenishing its losses; already in August, another Genoese fleet of 25 ships under Oberto D'Oria, a member of the powerful Doria family and future ruler of Genoa, set sail and made for the Adriatic. Furthermore, given that the cause and objective of the conflict was commercial, neither side entertained the thought of attempting to sail against the other's core territory for an all-out blow. The stalemate between the two powers continued, until King Louis IX of France, keen to use the Venetian and Genoese fleets in his planned Eighth Crusade, coerced both to sign a five-year-truce in the Treaty of Cremona in 1270.

== Sources ==
- Caro, Georg (1895). Genua und die Mächte am Mittelmeer 1257–1311. Ein Beitrag zur Geschichte des XIII. Jahrhunderts. Erster Band [Genoa and the Powers of the Mediterranean 1257–1311. Contribution to the History of the 13th Century. First Volume.] (in German). Halle a. S.: Max Niemeyer. OCLC 457285419.
- Dotson, John E. (1999). "Fleet Operations in the First Genoese-Venetian War, 1264–1266". Viator. Medieval and Renaissance Studies. 30: 165–180. doi:10.1484/J.VIATOR.2.300833. ISSN 0083-5897.
- Dotson, John E. (2006). "Ship Types and Fleet Composition at Genoa and Venice in the Early Thirteenth Century". In Pryor, John (ed.). Logistics of Warfare in the Age of the Crusades: Proceedings of a Workshop Held at the Centre for Medieval Studies, University of Sydney, 30 September to 4 October 2002. Aldershot: Ashgate Publishing, Ltd. pp. 63–76. ISBN 978-0-7546-5197-0.
- Imperiale di Sant'Angelo, Cesare, ed. (1926). Annali Genovesi di Caffaro e de'suoi continuatori, dal MCCLI al MCCLXXIX [Genoese Annals of Caffaro and of His Continuators, from 1251 to 1279]. Fonti per la Storia d'Italia (in Italian and Latin). Rome: Instituto Storico Italiano. OCLC 257849033.
- Manfroni, Camillo (1902). Storia della marina italiana, dal Trattato di Ninfeo alla caduta di Constantinopoli (1261–1453) [History of the Italian Navy, from the Treaty of Nymphaeum to the Fall of Constantinople (1261–1453)] (in Italian). Livorno: R. Accademia navale. OCLC 265927738.
- Pozza, Marco (1992). "Dondulo, Giacomo". Dizionario Biografico degli Italiani (in Italian). Vol. 41: Donaggio–Dugnani. Rome: Istituto dell'Enciclopedia Italiana. ISBN 978-88-12-00032-6.
- Stanton, Charles D. (2015). Medieval Maritime Warfare. Barnsley, South Yorkshire: Pen and Sword. ISBN 978-1-4738-5643-1.
- Wiel, Alethea (1910). The Navy of Venice. New York: E. P. Dutton and Company. OCLC 4198755.
