= Battle of Gallipoli (1416) =

1416 Naval battle between the Republic of Venice and the Ottoman Empire

- Part of the Ottoman–Venetian wars
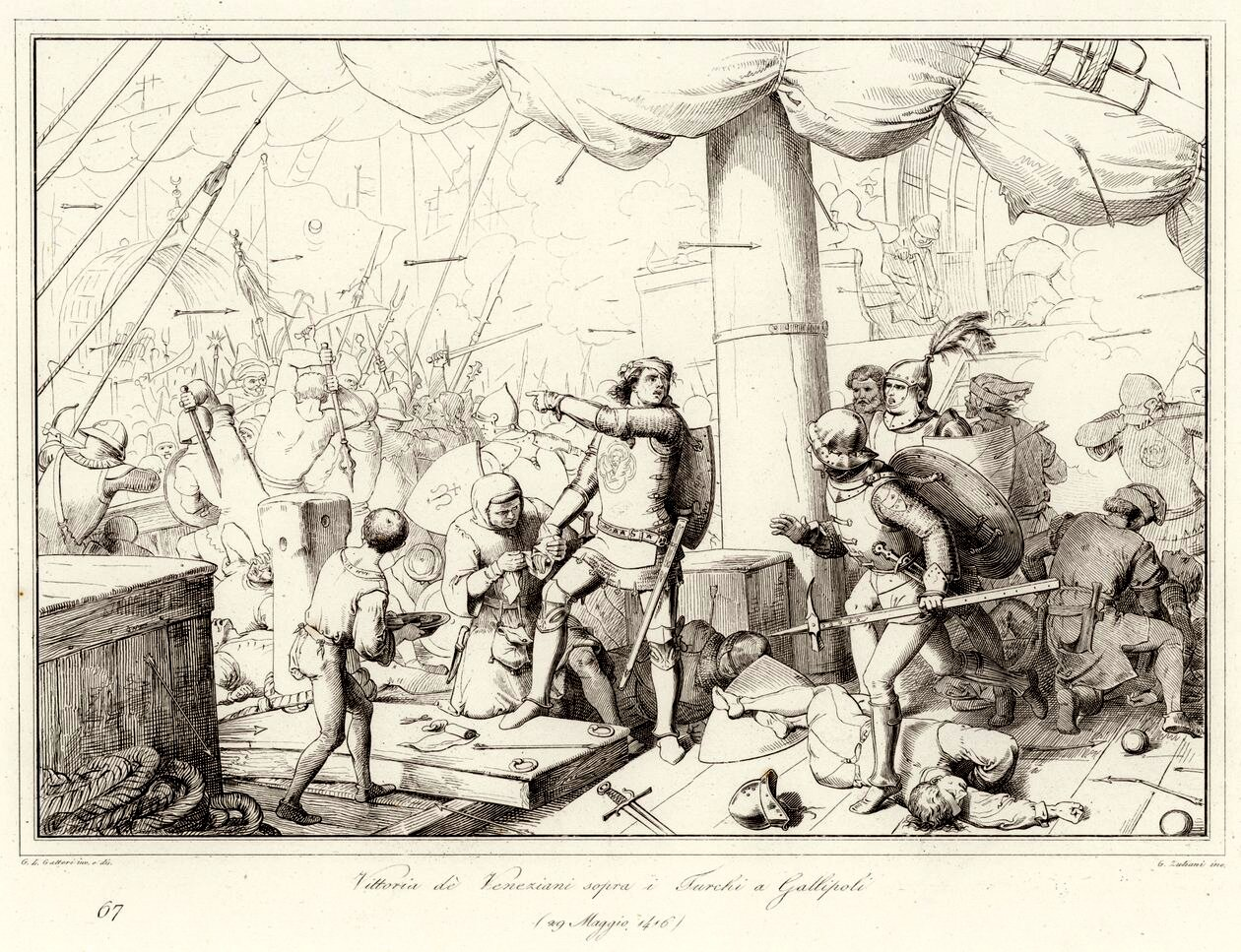
- Fanciful depiction of the battle, from Giuseppe Lorenzo Gatteri's La storia veneta
Date	29 May 1416
Location	between Gallipoli and Marmara Island approx. 40°27′N 26°48′E
Result	Venetian victory

Belligerents
Republic of Venice	Ottoman Empire

Commanders and leaders
(Republic of Venice) Pietro Loredan (WIA)	(Ottoman Empire) Çali Bey †

Strength
10 galleys	32 galleys & galleots

Casualties and losses
12 killed 340 wounded	4,000 killed 1,100 captured (several hundred executed); 12–27 ships captured

The Battle of Gallipoli occurred on 29 May 1416 between the fleets of the Republic of Venice and the Ottoman Empire off the port city of Gallipoli, the main Ottoman naval base. The battle was the main episode of a brief conflict between the two powers, resulting from Ottoman attacks against possessions and shipping of the Venetians and their allies in the Aegean Sea in 1414–1415. The Venetian fleet, under Pietro Loredan, was charged with transporting a Venetian embassy to the Ottoman sultan, but was authorized to attack if the Ottomans refused to negotiate. The subsequent events are known chiefly from a detailed letter written by Loredan after the battle.

The Ottomans exchanged fire with the Venetian ships as soon as the Venetian fleet approached Gallipoli on 27 May, forcing the Venetians to withdraw. On the next day, the two fleets maneuvered and fought off Gallipoli, but during the evening, Loredan managed to contact the Ottoman authorities and inform them of his diplomatic mission. Despite assurances that the Ottomans would welcome the ambassadors, when the Venetian fleet approached the city on the next day, 29 May, the Ottoman fleet sailed to meet the Venetians and the two sides quickly became embroiled in battle.

The Venetians scored a crushing victory, killing the Ottoman commander, capturing a large part of the Ottoman fleet, and taking large numbers of Ottoman crews prisoner, of whom many—particularly the Christians serving voluntarily in the Ottoman fleet—were executed. The Venetians then retired to Tenedos to replenish their supplies and rest. Although it confirmed Venetian naval superiority in the Aegean Sea for the next few decades, the battle had little impact: a peace agreement was brokered but refused by the Venetian Senate, and a settlement of the conflict was delayed until a peace treaty was signed in 1419.

== Background ==
=== Relations of Venice and the Ottoman Empire ===
Map of the southern Balkans and western Anatolia in 1410, during the later phase of the Ottoman Interregnum

In 1413, the Ottoman prince Mehmed I ended the civil war of the Ottoman Interregnum and established himself as sultan and the sole master of the Ottoman Turkish realm. The Republic of Venice, as the premier maritime and commercial power in the area, endeavoured to renew the treaties it had concluded with Mehmed's predecessors during the civil war, and in May 1414, its bailo (resident ambassador) in the Byzantine capital, Constantinople, Francesco Foscarini, was instructed to proceed to the Sultan's court to that effect. Foscarini failed, as Mehmed was away campaigning in Anatolia, and Venetian envoys were traditionally instructed not to move too far from the shore (and consequently the Republic's reach); Foscarini had yet to meet the Sultan by July 1415, when Mehmed's displeasure at this delay was conveyed to the Venetian authorities. In the meantime, tensions between the two powers mounted, as the Ottomans moved to re-establish a sizeable navy and launched several raids that challenged Venetian naval hegemony in the Aegean Sea.

=== Ottoman raids in the Aegean in 1414–1415 ===
During his 1414 campaign in Anatolia, Mehmed came to Smyrna, where several of the most important Latin rulers of the Aegean—the Genoese lords of the northeastern Aegean islands of Chios, Phokaia, and Lesbos, and even the Grand Master of the Knights Hospitaller of Rhodes—came to do him obeisance. According to the Byzantine historian Doukas, a contemporary of the events, the absence of the Duke of Naxos from this assembly provoked the ire of the Sultan, who in retaliation equipped a fleet of 30 vessels, under the command of Çali Bey, and in late 1415 sent it to raid the duke's domains in the Cyclades in the southern Aegean Sea. The Ottoman fleet ravaged the islands, and carried off a large part of the inhabitants of Andros, Paros, and Melos into slavery. On the other hand, the 16th-century Venetian historian Marino Sanuto the Younger indicates that the Ottoman attack was in retaliation for the raids against Ottoman shipping undertaken by Pietro Zeno, the lord of Andros. Like the Duke of Naxos, Zeno was a Venetian citizen and vassal of the Republic of Venice, but he had not been included in the previous treaties between the Republic and the Ottomans, and had continued raiding Ottoman shipping on his own account.

Apart from the attacks on Naxos, Ottoman raids were also directed against immediate Venetian interests. In June 1414, Ottoman ships also raided the Venetian colony of Euboea, an island off the eastern shore of mainland Greece. The Ottomans pillaged the colony's capital, Negroponte, taking almost all its inhabitants prisoner; out of some 2,000 captives, the Republic was able after years to secure the release of only 200, mostly elderly men, women, and children, the rest having been sold as slaves. Furthermore, in the autumn of 1415, ostensibly in retaliation for Zeno's attacks, an Ottoman fleet of 42 ships—6 galleys, 26 galleots, and the rest smaller brigantines—tried to intercept a Venetian merchant convoy coming from the Black Sea at the island of Tenedos, at the southern entrance of the Dardanelles. The Venetian vessels were delayed at Constantinople by bad weather, but managed to pass through the Ottoman fleet and outrun its pursuit to the safety of Negroponte. The Ottoman fleet instead raided Euboea, including an attack on the fortress of Oreos (Loreo) in northern Euboea, but its defenders under the castellan Taddeo Zane resisted with success. Nevertheless, the Turks were able to once again ravage the rest of the island, carrying off 1,500 captives, so that the local inhabitants even petitioned the Signoria of Venice for permission to become tributaries of the Turks to guarantee their future safety—a demand categorically rejected by the Signoria on 4 February 1416. The raids spread considerable panic: Lepanto on the western coast of Greece was deserted, and at Venice no one was found who wanted to contract, not even for a small sum, the right to equip merchant galleys bound for Constantinople, or the Black Sea ports of Tana and Trebizond. Due to the lucrative trade opportunities these ports offered, the contracts ordinarily fetched prices of up to 2,000 ducats, but now the Venetian government was obliged to supply armed escorts for the merchant galleys at its own expense. Nevertheless, the same missives to Venice also highlighted the bad state of the Turkish fleet, especially of its crews; and expressed the certainty that if a Venetian fleet had been present to confront them, it would have been victorious.

=== Diplomatic and military response of Venice ===
In response to the Ottoman raids, the Great Council of Venice engaged in feverish military preparations. A half-percent levy was raised on goods, soldiers and crossbowmen were recruited, and the experienced Pietro Loredan was appointed Captain of the Gulf, at the head of a fleet of fifteen galleys; five were to be equipped (Note: At this time, Venice had no standing fleet. Every winter, the standing committees of the Great Council of Venice established the annual orders for the so-called 'guard fleet', or 'fleet of the Gulf [i.e., the Adriatic Sea]'. The Great Council then voted on the proposals, the size of the fleet, and the appointment of a captain-general and the sopracomiti (captains) for the galleys to be outfitted in Venice. The commanders of the galleys equipped by Venetian colonies were decided by the local colonists.) in Venice, four at Candia (Crete), and one each at Negroponte, Napoli di Romania (Nauplia), Andros, and Corfu. Loredan's brother Giorgio, Jacopo Barbarigo, Cristoforo Dandolo, and Pietro Contarini were appointed as sopracomiti (galley captains), while Andrea Foscolo and Dolfino Venier were designated as provveditori (commissioners) of the fleet and ambassadors to the Sultan.

While Foscolo was charged with a mission to the Principality of Achaea in southern Greece, Venier was tasked with reaching a new agreement with the Sultan on the basis of the treaty concluded between Musa Çelebi and the Venetian ambassador Giacomo Trevisan in 1411, and with securing the release of the Venetian prisoners taken from Negroponte in 1414. Should negotiations fail, he was empowered to seek to form an anti-Ottoman league with the Bey of Karaman, the Prince of Wallachia, and the rebellious Ottoman prince Mustafa Çelebi. Loredan's appointment was unusual, as he had served recently as Captain of the Gulf, and law forbade anyone who had held the position from holding the same for three years after; the Great Council overrode this rule due to the de facto state of war with the Ottomans. In a further move calculated to bolster Loredan's authority (and appeal to his vanity), an old rule that had fallen into disuse was revived, whereby only the captain-general had the right to carry the Banner of Saint Mark on his flagship, rather than every sopracomito. With "rare unanimity", the Great Council voted to authorize Loredan to attack Ottoman possessions if the Ottomans had continued their raids in the meantime. If they were unwilling to negotiate a cessation of hostilities, he was to protect Venetian shipping and attack the Ottomans, without however putting his ships in excessive danger. Nevertheless, the emphasis of the Council's instructions was to ensure peace, and Loredan's squadron was intended as a form of military pressure to expedite negotiations. As no further news of Ottoman attacks arrived until Loredan sailed in April, the expectation in the Venetian government was that the matter would likely be resolved peacefully.

=== Role of Gallipoli ===
Map of the Dardanelles and their vicinity. Gallipoli (Gelibolu) is marked on the northern entrance of the straits.

The main target of Loredan's fleet was to be Gallipoli. Described by the Italian naval historian Camillo Manfroni as the "key of the Dardanelles", the city was one of the most important strategic positions in the Eastern Mediterranean. At the time it was also the main Turkish naval base and provided a safe haven for their corsairs raiding Venetian colonies in the Aegean. With Constantinople still in Christian hands, Gallipoli had also for decades been the main crossing point for the Ottoman armies from Anatolia to Europe. As a result of its strategic importance, Sultan Bayezid I took care to improve its fortifications, rebuilding the citadel and strengthening the harbour defences. The harbour had a seaward wall and a narrow entrance leading to an outer basin, separated from an inner basin by a bridge, where Bayezid erected a three-storey tower (the Birghoz-i Gelibolu). When Ruy González de Clavijo visited the city in 1403, he reported seeing its citadel full of troops, a large arsenal, and 40 ships in the harbour.

Bayezid aimed to use his warships in Gallipoli to control (and tax) the passage of shipping through the Dardanelles, an ambition which brought him into direct conflict with Venetian interests in the area. While the Ottoman fleet was not yet strong enough to face the Venetians, it forced the latter to provide armed escort to their trade convoys passing through the Dardanelles. Securing right of unimpeded passage through the Dardanelles was a chief issue in Venice's diplomatic relations with the Ottomans: the Republic had secured this in the 1411 treaty with Musa Çelebi, but the failure to renew that agreement in 1414 had again rendered Gallipoli, in the words of the 20th-century Ottomanist Halil İnalcık, "the main object of dispute in Venetian-Ottoman relations". The Ottoman naval raids in 1415, launched from Gallipoli, further underscored its importance.

== Battle ==
The events before and during the battle are described in detail in a letter sent by Loredan to the Signoria on 2 June 1416, which was included by Marino Sanuto in his History of the Doges of Venice, albeit with some major omissions, which are filled by the Morosini Codex of Antonio Morosini, who copies the letter virtually verbatim. Loredan's letter was written not simply as an account of the battle, but as a defence against any accusation that he might have overstepped his authority and needlessly risked his command; he is therefore at pains to emphasize that the battle began due to Turkish attacks on his ships. Loredan's account is essentially corroborated by the 15th-century Venetian chronicle attributed to Gasparo Zancaruolo, which provides some additional details from the now vanished Venetian archives or oral traditions, while Doukas also provides a brief and somewhat divergent account, which evidently is drawn from rumours and hearsay. The contemporary Byzantine historians Sphrantzes and Laonikos Chalkokondyles also provide brief accounts, emphasizing the Venetians' reluctance to get drawn into battle. (Note: For further medieval and modern literature, cf. Christ 2018, p. 144 (note 22))

=== Arrival of the Venetian fleet on 27 May ===
According to Loredan's letter, his fleet—four galleys from Venice, four from Candia, and one each from Negroponte and Napoli di Romania (Note: The sopracomiti of the Candiot galleys were Domenico Venier, Lorenzo Barbarigo, Albano Capello, and a Trevisan; of the galley of Negroponte, Marco Grimani; and of Napoli, Girolamo Minotto.)—was delayed by contrary winds and reached Tenedos on 24 May, and did not enter the Dardanelles until the 27th, when they arrived near Gallipoli. Loredan reports that the Venetians took care to avoid projecting any hostile intentions, avoiding any preparations for battle, such as erecting a pavisade around the ships. The Ottomans, who had assembled a large force of infantry and 200 cavalry on the shore, began firing on them with arrows. Loredan dispersed his ships to avoid casualties, but the tide was drawing them closer to the shore. Loredan tried to signal the Ottomans that they had no hostile intentions, but the latter kept firing poisoned arrows at them, until Loredan ordered a few cannon shots that killed a few soldiers and forced the rest to retire from the shore towards the anchorage of their fleet.

=== First clashes and negotiations on 28 May ===
At dawn on the next day (28 May), Loredan sent two galleys, bearing the Banner of Saint Mark, to the entry of the port of Gallipoli to open negotiations. In response the Turks sent 32 ships to attack them. Loredan withdrew his two galleys, and began to withdraw, while shooting at the Turkish ships, in order to lure them away from Gallipoli. As the Ottoman ships could not keep up with their oars, they set sail as well; on the Venetian side, the galley from Napoli di Romania tarried during the manoeuvre and was in danger of being caught by the pursuing Ottoman ships, so that Loredan likewise ordered his ships to set sail. Once they were made ready for combat, Loredan ordered his ten galleys to lower sails, turn about, and face the Ottoman fleet. At that point, the eastern wind rose suddenly, and the Ottomans decided to break off the pursuit and head back to Gallipoli. Loredan in turn tried to catch up with the Ottomans, firing at them with his guns and crossbows and launching grappling hooks at the Turkish ships, but the wind and the current allowed the Ottomans to retreat speedily behind the fortifications of Gallipoli, where they went to anchor in battle formation, with their prows to the open sea. According to Loredan, the engagement lasted until late in the afternoon.

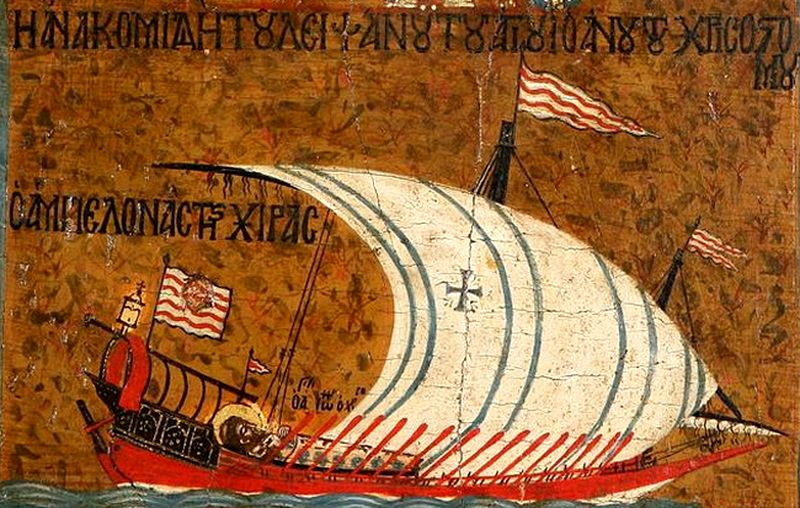
14th-century painting of a light galley, from an icon now at the Byzantine and Christian Museum at Athens

Loredan then sent a messenger to the Ottoman fleet commander to complain about the attack, insisting that his intentions were pacific, and that his sole purpose was to convey the two ambassadors to the Sultan. The Ottoman commander replied that he was ignorant of that fact, and that his fleet was meant to sail to the Danube and stop Mehmed's brother and rival for the throne, Mustafa Çelebi, from crossing from Wallachia into Ottoman Rumelia. The Ottoman commander informed Loredan that he and his crews could land and provision themselves without fear, and that the members of the embassy would be conveyed with the appropriate honours and safety to their destination. Loredan sent a notary, Thomas, with an interpreter to the Ottoman commander and the captain of the garrison of Gallipoli to express his regrets, but also to gauge the number, equipment, and dispositions of the Ottoman galleys. The Ottoman dignitaries reassured Thomas of their good will, and proposed to provide an armed escort for the ambassadors to bring them to the court of Sultan Mehmed.

After the envoy returned, the Venetian fleet, sailing with difficulty against the eastern wind, departed and sailed to a nearby bay to spend the night. During the night, a council of war was conducted. The provveditore Venier and the Candiot sopracomito Albano Capello urged to seize the opportunity to attack the Ottoman fleet in its harbour, since the Ottoman fleet was disorganized, and its crews largely composed of Christian slaves, who were likely to use the opportunity to escape. Loredan and the other sopracomiti hesitated to go against their instructions, or to attack the enemy fleet, protected as it was by a powerful fortress and close to reinforcements from the land troops. The episode is omitted by Sanudo but provided by Morosini, likely because it sheds unfavourable light on Venier's judgment; Sanudo himself had a Venier mother, and may have been eager to conceal this embarrassing episode of family history. During the same night, the Turkish ships left their anchorage and deployed in a line of battle opposite the Venetians, without however making any hostile moves; but at and around Gallipoli, numerous troop movements could be observed, with soldiers boarding vessels of every kind. As Manfroni comments, this "was perhaps a measure of precaution and surveillance, so that with the favour of the night the Venetians would not ferry Mustafa's militias"—the Ottoman commander was naturally unaware of the Venetians' instructions not to seek to treat with Mustafa except in the event of the failure of negotiations with Mehmed. However, to the Venetians, the Turkish moves looked like a deliberate provocation. Loredan managed to move his ships about half a mile (c. 800–900 m) away from the Turks; but he also modified his orders to his fleet, commanding them to be ready for combat at any moment.

=== Battle of 29 May ===
On the next day, in accordance to the messages exchanged the previous day, Loredan led his ships towards Gallipoli to replenish his supplies of water, while leaving three galleys—those of his brother, of Dandolo, and of Capello of Candia—as a reserve in his rear. As soon as the Venetians approached the town, the Ottoman fleet sailed to meet them, and one of their galleys approached and fired a few cannon shots at the Venetian vessels. According to the account by Doukas, the Venetians were pursuing a merchant vessel (Note: Zancaruolo also mentions the presence of a Venetian cargo vessel carrying raisins, without giving further detail.) of Lesbos, thought to be of Turkish origin, coming from Constantinople. The Ottomans likewise thought that the merchant vessel was one of their own, and one of their galleys moved to defend the vessel, bringing the two fleets into battle. This version, which suggests that the ensuing battle was the result of a misunderstanding, is completely absent from the account of Loredan and the Venetian sources.

The galley from Napoli, which sailed to his left, was again having trouble keeping with the battle formation, so Loredan ordered it moved to the right, away from the approaching Turks. (Note: Chalkokondyles gives their strength as 25 'triremes' and 80 other vessels.) Loredan had his ships withdraw a while, in order to draw the Turks further from Gallipoli and have the sun to the Venetians' back. (Note: Sphrantzes and Chalkokondyles both assert that the battle took place in the open waters between Gallipoli and Marmara Island.) Both Zancaruolo and Chalkokondyles report that the Napoli galley opened the battle by advancing ahead of the Venetian fleet—its captain, Girolamo Minotto, misinterpreted Loredan's signals to stay back, according to Chalkokondyles—and attacking the Ottoman flagship, after which Loredan with the rest of the Venetian fleet joined the battle. Loredan himself describes his own ship's attack on the leading Ottoman galley. Its crew offered determined resistance, and the other Ottoman galleys came astern of Loredan's ship to his left, and launched volleys of arrows against him and his men. Loredan himself was wounded by an arrow below the eye and the nose, and by another that passed through his left hand, as well as other arrows that struck him with lesser effect. Nevertheless, the galley was captured after most of its crew was killed, and Loredan, after leaving a few men of his crew to guard it, turned against a galleot, which he captured as well. Again leaving a few of his men and his flag on it, he turned on the other Ottoman ships. The fight lasted from dawn to the second hour. (Note: Zancaruolo writes that the battle lasted three hours in total.) Both Venetian and Byzantine sources agree that many of the Ottoman crews simply jumped into the sea and abandoned their ships, and that the Ottomans retreated once the battle clearly turned against them.

The Venetians defeated the Ottoman fleet, killing its commander Çali Bey (Cialasi-beg Zeberth) and many of the captains and crews, and capturing six great galleys and nine galleots, according to Loredan's account. Doukas claims that the Venetians captured 27 vessels in total, while the contemporary Egyptian chronicler Maqrizi reduced the number to twelve. Loredan gives a detailed breakdown of the ships captured by his men: his own ship captured a galley and a galleot of 20 banks of oars; the Contarini galley captured a galley; the galley of Giorgio Loredan captured two galleots of 22 banks and two galleots of 20 banks; the Grimani galley of Negroponte captured a galley; the galley of Jiacopo Barbarini captured a galleot of 23 banks and another of 19 banks; the same for the Capello galley; the galley of Girolamo Minotto from Napoli captured the Ottoman flagship galley, which had been defeated and pursued before by the Capello galley; the Venier and Barbarigo galleys of Candia took a galley. Venetian casualties were light, twelve killed—mostly by drowning—and 340 wounded, most of them lightly. Loredan reported taking 1,100 captives, while Maqrizi puts the total number of Ottoman dead at 4,000 men.

The Venetian fleet then approached Gallipoli and bombarded the port, without response from the Ottomans within the walls. The Venetians then retired about a mile from Gallipoli to recover their strength and tend to their wounded. Among the captive Ottoman crews were found to be many Christians—Genoese, Catalans, Cretans, Provencals, and Sicilians—who were all executed as renegades by hanging from the yardarms, while a certain Giorgio Calergi, who had participated in a revolt against Venice in Crete, was quartered at the deck of Loredan's flagship. Many of the Christian galley slaves also perished in combat. Doukas places these events later, at Tenedos, where the Turkish prisoners were executed, while the Christian prisoners were divided into those who had been pressed into service as galley slaves, who were liberated, and those who had entered Ottoman service as mercenaries, who were impaled. After burning five galleots in sight of Gallipoli for lack of crews to man them, Loredan made ready to retire with his ships to Tenedos (Note: Tenedos had been depopulated and demilitarized under the terms of the Treaty of Turin in 1381, between Venice and Genoa.) to take on water, repair his ships, tend to his wounded, and make new plans. The Venetian commander sent a new letter to the Ottoman commander in the city complaining of breach of faith and explaining that he would return from Tenedos to carry out his mission of escorting the ambassadors, but the Ottoman commander did not reply.

== Aftermath ==
One of the Turkish captains that had been taken prisoner composed a letter to the Sultan, stating that the Venetians had been attacked without cause. He also informed Loredan that the remnants of the Ottoman fleet were such that they posed no threat to him: a single galley and a few galleots and smaller vessels were seaworthy, while the rest of the galleys in Gallipoli were out of commission. At Tenedos, Loredan held a council of war, where the prevailing opinion was to return to Negroponte for provisions, for offloading the wounded, and for selling three of the galleys for prize money for the crews. Loredan disagreed, believing that they should keep up the pressure on the Turks, and resolved to return to Gallipoli to press for the passage of the ambassadors to the Sultan's court. He sent his brother with his ship to bring the more heavily wounded to Negroponte, and burned three of the captured galleys since they were too much of a burden—in his letter to the Signoria, he expressed the hope that his men would still be recompensed for them, his shipwrights estimating their value at 600 gold ducats.

=== Abortive peace settlement ===
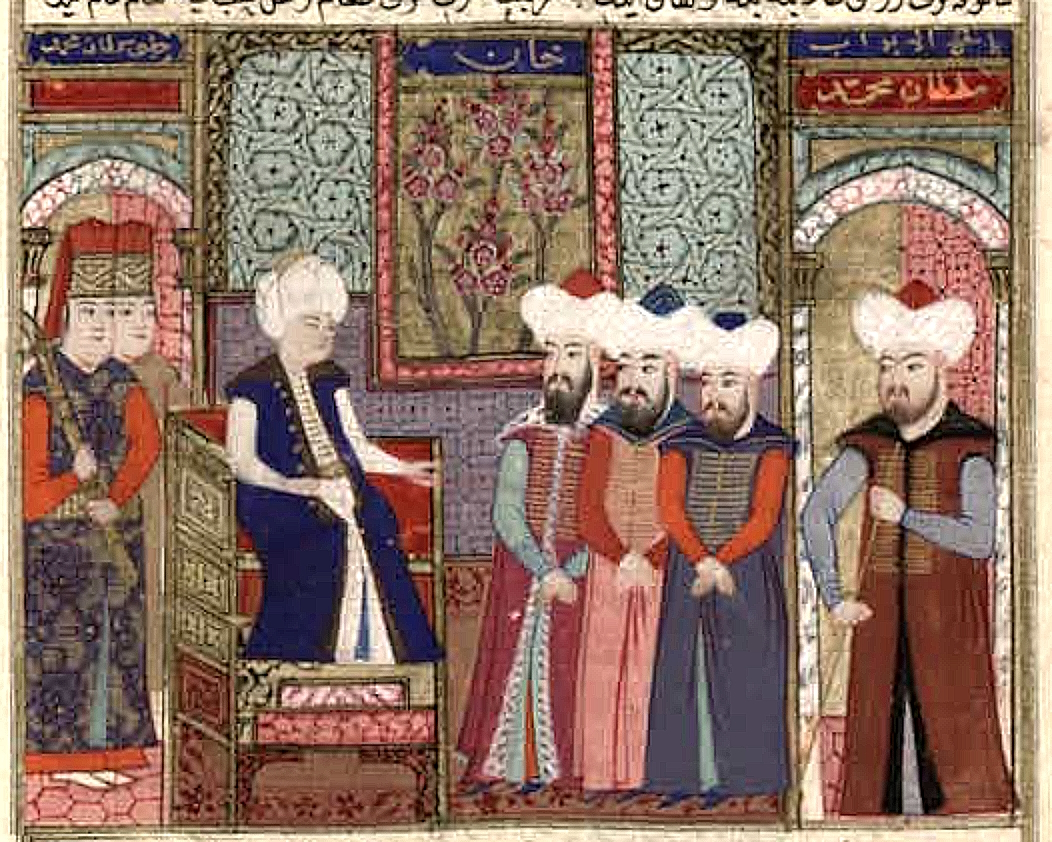
Sultan Mehmed I with his courtiers, Ottoman miniature painting, kept at Istanbul University

The news of the victory at Gallipoli were received with much enthusiasm in Venice, as it was the first major naval engagement since the War of Chioggia (1378–1381), and against the feared Turks to boot. At the same time, there was no appetite for a prolonged conflict: the Republic was still menaced by the Hungarian king Sigismund in Friuli, mindful of rising Genoese influence in Greece, and wary of the expense maintaining a fleet entailed. The hope was that the Sultan, suitably chastised, would now be amenable to a peace. Indeed, on 9 July the Venetian Senate ordered Loredan, once peace had been concluded, to sail to the Morea, with orders to seize Zonchio and to counter a reported Genoese landing there. When the latter proved false, the Senate instructed Loredan to return to escort duty for merchant convoys and the protection of Negroponte.

Landing the ambassadors was delayed until July, but was in the end successful, possibly via Constantinople, where Loredan reports having received precious relics from Emperor Manuel II Palaiologos as a reward for his victory. The ambassadors made for the Ottoman court, most likely located at the time at Adrianople. On 31 July, the provveditore Dolfino Venier managed to reach an agreement with the Sultan, including the mutual return of prisoners, the restoration of the Marquisate of Bodonitza (a Venetian client) in the Greek mainland, and the permission for Venetians to attack any armed Turkish vessels that sailed beyond the Dardanelles. Nothing was mentioned of a Venetian tribute for Lepanto and Venetian Albania, but no restitution for the losses suffered at Negroponte either. The return of prisoners in particular rankled with the Venetians, since the Ottoman naval prisoners were valuable as potential galley crews and their release would strengthen the Ottoman fleet. The Senate refused to ratify the treaty, and Venier was held to have exceeded his original brief. On his return to Venice on 31 October, Venier found himself under trial, although he was eventually acquitted. On 24 February 1417, an envoy of the Sultan, a "gran baron" named "Chamitzi" (probably Hamza) arrived in Venice, and demanded the release of the Ottoman prisoners, especially since the Sultan had already released 200 of the prisoners taken at Negroponte. To this the Venetians, who regarded Venier's agreement as void, objected that only the old and infirm were released, while the rest had been sold to slavery; and that no comparison could be made between people captured during a raid with prisoners taken "in a just war". Rather, the Senate ordered for the next year the arming of ten galleys under a new Captain of the Gulf, Jacopo Trevisan.

=== Continued negotiations and the peace of 1419 ===
Loredan returned to Venice in December 1416, to a triumphal welcome. According to Doukas, in the spring of 1417 the Venetian fleet moved into the Dardanelles once more, and attempted to capture a fortress (the Emir Süleyman Burkozi) that had been erected by Mehmed's brother, Süleyman Çelebi, at Lampsakos on the Anatolian side of the Straits. While they inflicted significant damage to the fort with their missiles, the Venetians were prevented from landing due to the presence of Hamza Bey, the brother of the Grand Vizier Bayezid Pasha, with 10,000 men. As a result, the Venetians left the fort half-destroyed and sailed on to Constantinople. In their wake, Hamza Bey had the fort razed, for fear that the Venetians might in the future capture it. In May 1417, the Venetians instructed their bailo in Constantinople, Giovanni Diedo, to seek a peace agreement with the Sultan. During the next two years Diedo was unable to achieve anything, partly due to the restrictions placed on his movements—he was not to proceed more than four days' march inland from the shore—and partly due to the Sultan's own stance, which was expected to be negative to Venice's proposals. Freedom of passage for the Dardanelles, and an exemption from any duties or tolls for that passage, were among the chief Venetian demands. The return of the prisoners taken at Negroponte was also pursued, but Diedo was instructed to conclude peace even without them rather than consent to an exchange; such was the determination of the Senate to keep the naval crews captured at Gallipoli from returning to Ottoman service.

Over the following years, the Venetian position deteriorated: Valona in Albania fell to the Turks, while the Hungarian threat and the Ottoman advance in Albania kept the Venetian fleet, under Niccolò Cappello, in the Adriatic. This led the Republic to backtrack on its previous demands, and the conflict was finally ended in November 1419, when a peace treaty was signed between the Sultan and the new Venetian bailo in Constantinople, Bertuccio Diedo, in which the Ottomans recognized by name Venice's overseas possessions, and Venice undertook to pay tribute for Albania and Lepanto. The exchange of prisoners, that had been so vehemently opposed by Venice, was also agreed—both those taken by the Ottomans from Euboea, and by Venice at Gallipoli.

The victory at Gallipoli ensured Venetian naval superiority for decades to come, but also led the Venetians to complacency and over-confidence, as, according to historian Seth Parry, the "seemingly effortless trouncing of the Ottoman fleet confirmed the Venetians in their beliefs that they were vastly superior to the Turks in naval warfare". Even so, during the Siege of Thessalonica in 1422–1430 and subsequent conflicts over the course of the century, "the Venetians would learn to their discomfiture that naval superiority alone could not guarantee an everlasting position of strength in the eastern Mediterranean".

== Sources ==
- Antoniadis, Sophia (1966). "Le récit du combat naval de Gallipoli chez Zancaruolo en comparison avec le texte d'Antoine Morosini et les historiens grecs du XVe siècle". In Pertusi, A. (ed.). Venezia e l'Oriente fra tardo Medioevo e Rinascimento (in French). Florence: G. C. Sansoni. pp. 267–281. OCLC 4500339.
- Christ, Georg (2018). "News from the Aegean: Antonio Morosini Reporting on Ottoman-Venetian Relations in the Wake of the Battle of Gallipoli (Early 15th Century)". In Kolditz, Sebastian; Koller, Markus (eds.). The Transitions from the Byzantine to the Ottoman Era. Rome: Viella. pp. 139–162. ISBN 978-88-3313-636-3.
- Fabris, Antonio (1992). "From Adrianople to Constantinople: Venetian–Ottoman diplomatic missions, 1360–1453". Mediterranean Historical Review. 7 (2): 154–200. doi:10.1080/09518969208569639.
- Gullino, Giuseppe (1996). "Le frontiere navali". In Alberto Tenenti; Ugo Tucci (eds.). Storia di Venezia. Dalle origini alla caduta della Serenissima (in Italian). Vol. IV: Il Rinascimento. Politica e cultura. Rome: Enciclopedia Italiana. pp. 13–111. OCLC 644711024.
- İnalcık, Halil (1965). "Gelibolu". In Lewis, B.; Pellat, Ch. & Schacht, J. (eds.). The Encyclopaedia of Islam, Second Edition. Volume II: C–G. Leiden: E. J. Brill. pp. 983–987. OCLC 495469475.
- İnalcık, Halil (1991). "Meḥemmed I". In Bosworth, C. E.; van Donzel, E. & Pellat, Ch. (eds.). The Encyclopaedia of Islam, Second Edition. Volume VI: Mahk–Mid. Leiden: E. J. Brill. pp. 973–978. ISBN 978-90-04-08112-3.
- Laugier, Marc-Antoine (1760). Histoire de la République de Venise depuis sa fondation jusqu'à présent. Tome cinquième (in French). Paris: N. B. Duchesne.
- Magoulias, Harry, ed. (1975). Decline and Fall of Byzantium to the Ottoman Turks, by Doukas. An Annotated Translation of "Historia Turco-Byzantina" by Harry J. Magoulias, Wayne State University. Detroit: Wayne State University Press. ISBN 0-8143-1540-2.
- Manfroni, Camillo (1902). "La battaglia di Gallipoli e la politica veneto-turca (1381–1420)". L'Ateneo Veneto (in Italian). XXV (II). Venice. Fasc. I, pp. 3–34; Fasc. II, pp. 129–169.
- Melville-Jones, J. (2017). "The Battle of Gallipoli 1416: A Detail Rescued from a Chronicle". The Medieval Chronicle. Vol. 11. pp. 213–219. doi:10.1163/9789004351875_012. ISBN 978-90-04-34158-6. JSTOR 48577797.
- Miller, William (1908). The Latins in the Levant: A History of Frankish Greece (1204–1566). London: John Murray.
- Parry, Seth (2008). Fifty Years of Failed Plans: Venice, Humanism, and the Turks (1453–1503) (Ph.D. dissertation). City University of New York. ISBN 978-0-549-80891-6.
- Sanudo, Marin (1733). "Vite de' duchi di Venezia". In Muratori, Ludovico Antonio (ed.). Rerum Italicarum Scriptores, Tomus XXII (in Italian). Milan. cols. 399–1252.
- Setton, Kenneth M. (1976). The Papacy and the Levant (1204–1571), Volume I: The Thirteenth and Fourteenth Centuries. Vol. 1. Philadelphia: The American Philosophical Society. ISBN 0-87169-114-0.
- Setton, Kenneth M. (1978). The Papacy and the Levant (1204–1571), Volume II: The Fifteenth Century. Vol. 2. Philadelphia: The American Philosophical Society. ISBN 0-87169-127-2.
- Stahl, Alan M. (2009). "Michael of Rhodes: Mariner in Service to Venice". In Long, Pamela O. (ed.). The Book of Michael of Rhodes: A Fifteenth-Century Maritime Manuscript. Volume III: Studies. Cambridge, Massachusetts: MIT Press. pp. 35–98. ISBN 978-0-262-12308-2.
