= Jacopo Dondulo =

Venetian politician and sailor

Jacopo Dondulo (Italian: Giacomo Dondulo or Dandolo; fl. 1258–1288) was a Venetian sailor, military commander, and politician in the 13th century. He played a distinguished role in the naval conflicts of the War of Saint Sabas against the Republic of Venice, leading the Venetian navy to a crushing victory at the Battle of Trapani in 1266. He served also several tenures as a member of the Great Council of Venice, as Bailo of Negroponte in 1277–1279, and as Duke of Candia in 1281–1283, where he faced the start of the Revolt of Alexios Kallergis.

== Biography ==
Jacopo Dondulo is the only well-known member of his family, which resided in the parish of the Santi Apostoli, and which died out in the first half of the 14th century. As a result, he is often erroneously called "Dandolo".

=== Service against Genoa ===
He was born in Venice, probably in the 1210s or 1220s. In 1257, he participated in the expedition to the Levant under Lorenzo Tiepolo, probably as a galley captain. He served with distinction during that year and the next, culminating in the Venetian victory over the Genoese at the Battle of Acre on 24 June 1258, and the expulsion of the Genoese from Acre.

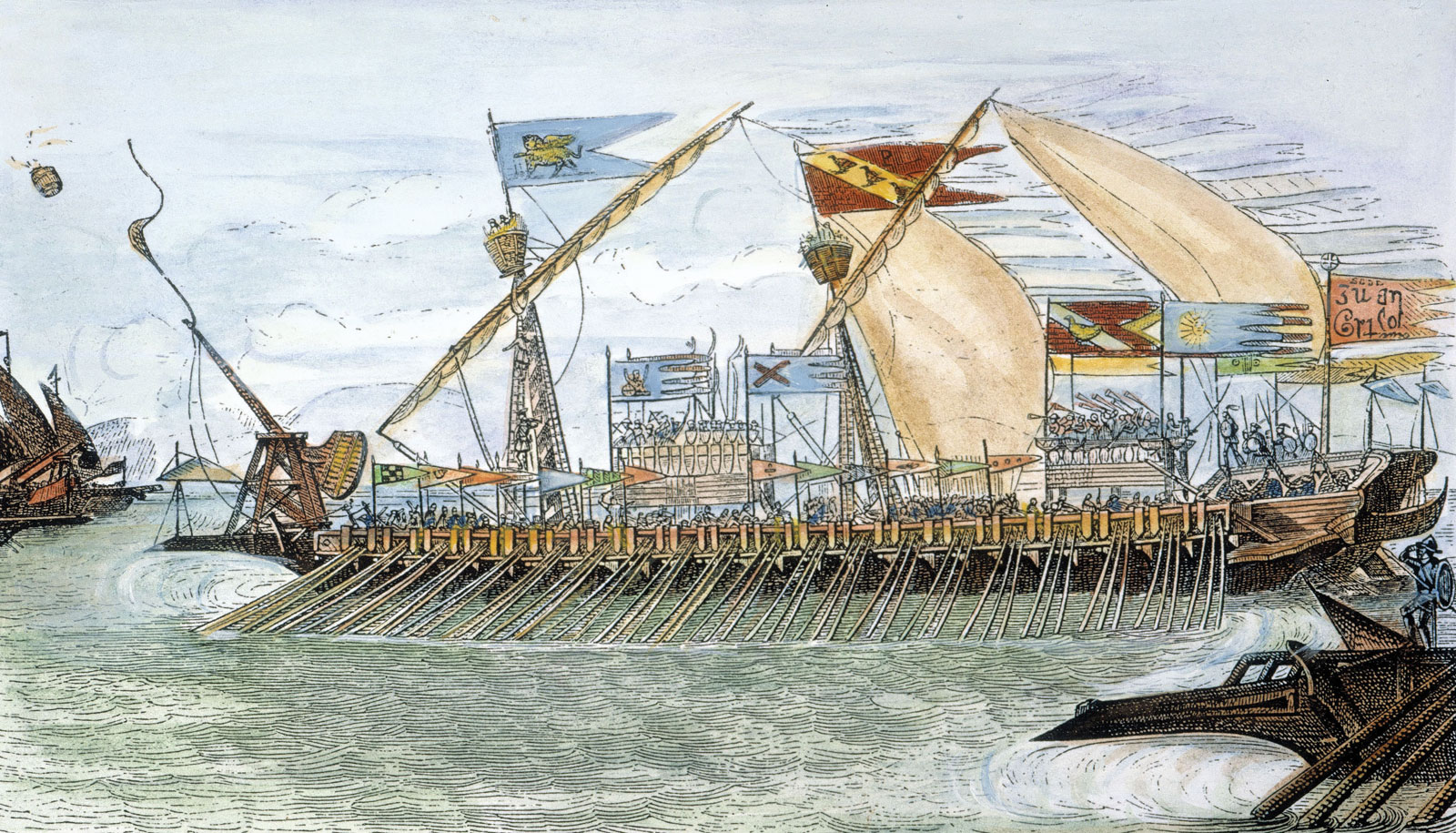
19th-century image of a 13th-century Venetian galley

Back in Venice, he was elected to the Great Council of Venice in 1261, and again in 1264. In 1266, he was elected captain of the fleet sent to oppose the Genoese. After leading his fifteen ships on a raid on Tunis, he vainly awaited the arrival of the Genoese fleet in the waters around the Strait of Messina, and turned back towards Venice. At Ragusa he met with news that the Genoese fleet had sailed at last, and with reinforcements of ten more galleys under Marco Gradenigo. The two fleets met at the Battle of Trapani on 23 June 1266, in which the Genoese took up a defensive position, allowing the Venetians to score a crushing victory: almost the entire Genoese fleet was captured.

Dondulo was acclaimed a hero on his return to Venice in July, towing the captured ships, and was duly elected as Captain General of the Sea. He soon fell out with Doge Reniero Zeno, however: the Doge insisted that the fleet restrict itself to escorting the merchant convoys, whereas Dondulo strongly supported the idea that the fleet should, rather than return to Venice once the convoys were safely under way, remain at sea seeking to attack Genoese shipping. As a result of this disagreement, Dondulo resigned and was replaced by his lieutenant, Marco Zeno.

Marco Zeno's cautious leadership left the seas open to the Genoese raiders, who preyed on unescorted Venetian shipping, so that in spring 1267, Dondulo was recalled to command. This time he carried out his chosen strategy, keeping the fleet at sea and attacking the Genoese fleet that was blockading Acre in August. This time, the Genoese tried to escape, so that the Venetians only captured five ships; and when the two fleets met again at Tyre, the Genoese again refused to offer battle and escaped. Returning to Venice, Dondulo was again elected to the Great Council on 1 October, as he was again in 1270.

=== War against Bologna and Dogal election ===
In 1271, he was sent as one of the commanders of the war against Bologna, distinguishing himself during the siege operations at the head of a contingent of conscripted Venetian citizens from the sestiere of San Marco. Following a heavy Venetian defeat on 1 September, Dondulo and his old lieutenant Marco Gradenigo took over the Venetian forces, with Dondulo commanding the fleet on the Po River and Gradenigo the land army. After repulsing a Bolognese attack with heavy losses, the Venetians were able to withdraw orderly and retreat by embarking on Dondulo's fleet. In 1274, Dondulo was elected ducal councillor, and rook part in the signing of a treaty with Mantua. In 1275, he was among the electors of the new Doge, Jacopo Contarini.

=== Bailo of Negroponte ===
Map of the southern Greece, with the Byzantine possessions and the Latin states, c. 1278

In 1277, he was appointed Bailo of Negroponte, during a delicate period. Venice had just concluded a treaty with the Byzantine Empire, which established peace between the two powers in other areas, but explicitly left both free to engage in hostilities over the fate of the island of Negroponte (Euboea). In 1276, following their victory over the Lombard barons (the "triarchs") of Negroponte at the Battle of Demetrias, the Byzantines began the reconquest of Euboea, spearheaded by the Lombard renegade Licario. By 1278, he had seized almost all of the island except for the capital, the city of Negroponte (Chalkis), which was under Venetian control. During Dondulo's two-year term, the Byzantines did not attack the Venetians, but did so within a few weeks after his departure, in a battle in which Licario defeated the Latins and captured John I de la Roche, the Duke of Athens.

=== Duke of Candia ===
In 1280, he was again elected, for the last time, to the Great Council. At the end of his term, he was elected Duke of Candia, i.e., governor of the major Venetian colony of Crete. He held this post in 1281–1283. In this capacity, Dondulo had to confront the outbreak of the last and greatest of the anti-Venetian and pro-Byzantine rebellions of the native Cretans, the Revolt of Alexios Kallergis, which lasted until 1299. Seeking to avoid the uprising, Dondulo called Kallergis to conciliate him, but the latter refused. Giacomo Dolfin was sent to campaign against Kallergis, but with little success. Instead, the Venetian authorities decided to evacuate the part of the island that they could not control effectively. Dondulo himself took the field against the rebels, but without success.

After his return to Venice, his fate is obscure. He is next attested on 19 September 1288 at Treviso, where he was seeking to buy property. This is the last notice of him in the sources, and it is likely that he died shortly after.

== Sources ==
- Detorakis, Theocharis E. (1986). Ιστορία της Κρήτης [History of Crete] (in Greek). Athens. OCLC 715204595.
- Fine, John V. A., Jr. (1994) [1987]. The Late Medieval Balkans: A Critical Survey from the Late Twelfth Century to the Ottoman Conquest. Ann Arbor, Michigan: University of Michigan Press. ISBN 978-0-472-10079-8.
- Geanakoplos, Deno John (1959). Emperor Michael Palaeologus and the West, 1258–1282: A Study in Byzantine-Latin Relations. Cambridge, Massachusetts: Harvard University Press.
- Pozza, Marco (1992). "DONDULO, Giacomo". Dizionario Biografico degli Italiani (in Italian). Vol. 41: Donaggio–Dugnani. Rome: Istituto dell'Enciclopedia Italiana. ISBN 978-88-12-00032-6.
- Setton, Kenneth M. (1976). The Papacy and the Levant (1204–1571), Volume I: The Thirteenth and Fourteenth Centuries. Vol. 1. Philadelphia: The American Philosophical Society. ISBN 0-87169-114-0.
