= Ottoman–Venetian peace treaty (1419) =

1419 treaty between the Ottoman Empire and the Republic of Venice

- The Balkans and western Anatolia in 1410. Ottoman and other Turkish territories are marked in shades of brown, Venetian or Venetian-influenced ones in shades of green.
- Signed: 6 November 1419
- Mediators: Manuel II Palaiologos
- Signatories: Republic of Venice; Ottoman Empire

The Ottoman–Venetian peace treaty of 1419 was signed between the Ottoman Empire and Republic of Venice, ending a short conflict between the two powers, confirming Venetian possessions in the Aegean Sea and the Balkans, and stipulating the rules of maritime trade between them.

== Background ==
Following the victory of the Ottoman prince Mehmed I in the civil war of the Ottoman Interregnum in 1413, the Republic of Venice, as the premier maritime and commercial power in the area, endeavoured to renew the treaties it had concluded with Mehmed's predecessors. Its bailo in the Byzantine capital, Constantinople, Francesco Foscarini, was instructed to proceed to the Sultan's court to that effect. Foscarini failed, however, as Mehmed campaigned in Anatolia, and Venetian envoys were traditionally instructed not to move too far from the shore (and the Republic's reach); Foscarini had yet to meet the Sultan by July 1415, when Mehmed's displeasure at this delay was conveyed to the Venetian authorities. In the meantime, tensions between the two powers mounted, as the Ottomans moved to re-establish a sizeable navy and launched several raids that challenged Venetian naval hegemony in the Aegean Sea.

In early 1416, the Ottoman fleet under the command of Çalı Bey (Chali Bey) attacked the islands of the Duchy of the Archipelago, a vassal of the Republic of Venice. The Ottomans then tried to intercept the Venetian trade convoys from the Black Sea, and attacked the Venetian colony of Negroponte, carrying off 1,500 inhabitants as prisoners. In response to the Ottoman raids, in April 1416 the Signoria appointed Pietro Loredan as captain-general and charged him with equipping a fleet and sail to Gallipoli with envoys to the Sultan. If the Ottomans refused to negotiate, Loredan was authorized to fight. In the event, Loredan's fleet was attacked by the Ottomans off Gallipoli, but Loredan scored a crushing victory on 29 May 1416. Following the naval clash at Gallipoli, between 24 and 26 July 1416, the Venetian ambassador Dolfino Venier managed to reach a first agreement with the Sultan, including the mutual return of prisoners. However, the latter condition exceeded Venier's original brief and was ill-received in Venice, since the Ottoman naval prisoners were valuable as potential galley slaves and their release would only serve to once again strengthen the Ottoman fleet. Consequently, on his return to Venice on 31 October, Venier found himself under trial, but was eventually acquitted.

On 24 February 1417, an envoy of the Sultan, a "gran baron" named "Chamitzi" (probably Hamza) arrived in Venice, and demanded the release of the Ottoman prisoners, especially since the Sultan had already released 200 of the prisoners taken at Negroponte. To this the Venetians, who regarded the agreement negotiated by Venier as void, objected that only the old and infirm had been released, while the rest had been sold to slavery; and that no comparison could be made between people captured during a raid with prisoners taken "in a just war". In May 1417, the Venetians instructed their bailo in Constantinople, Giovanni Diedo, to seek a peace agreement with the Sultan, but during the next two years Diedo was unable to achieve anything, partly due to the restrictions placed on his movements—he was not to proceed more than four days' march inland from the shore—and partly due to the Sultan's own stance, which was expected to be negative to Venice's proposals, that expressly refused a prisoner exchange.

In July 1419, a new bailo, Bertuccio Diedo, was appointed, who was given leave to move as far as eight days' march from the shore to meet the Sultan. Diedo concluded a treaty with the Sultan on 6 November; a copy arrived in Venice on 5 December.

== Provisions ==
Byzantine Emperor Manuel II Palaiologos volunteered to be the mediator, and the two sides agreed on the following:

1. Prisoners of war from both sides (those taken at Negroponte by the Ottomans and at Gallipoli by the Venetians) were exchanged.
2. The Duchy of the Archipelago was recognized as an independent party.
3. The rights of both parties to trade in each other's territories were affirmed.
4. The Sultan recognized, by name, Venetian control over 38 fortresses, islands, and localities in the Aegean and the coasts of the Balkans.
5. Venice promised to pay an annual tribute of 100 ducats to the Sultan for control of Lepanto, and of 200 ducats for Alessio, Drivasto, and Scutari.

== Aftermath ==
Only four years later, Venice found itself again in conflict with the Ottomans, when it took over control of Thessalonica from its Byzantine ruler. For the next seven years, Venice tried to defend the city and secure diplomatic recognition of its possession from the new Sultan, Murad II, but in vain. Finally, on 29 March 1430, the city was stormed by the Ottomans, and a new peace treaty was concluded on 4 September 1430.

== Sources ==
- Fabris, Antonio (1992). "From Adrianople to Constantinople: Venetian–Ottoman diplomatic missions, 1360–1453". Mediterranean Historical Review. 7 (2): 154–200. doi:10.1080/09518969208569639.
- von Hammer-Purgstall, Joseph (1827). Geschichte des osmanischen Reiches, grossentheils aus bisher unbenützten Handschriften und Archiven, durch Joseph von Hammer: Erster Band. Von der Gründung des osmanischen Reiches bis zur Eroberung Konstantinopels, 1300—1453 (in German). Pest: C. A. Hartleben.
- Setton, Kenneth M. (1978). The Papacy and the Levant (1204–1571), Volume II: The Fifteenth Century. Philadelphia: The American Philosophical Society. ISBN 0-87169-127-2.
