= Battle of Saseno =

War of Saint Sabas naval battle

- Part of the War of Saint Sabas
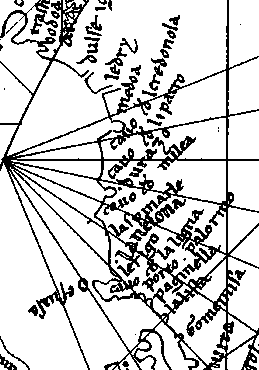
- 13th Century map of Albania and Sazan Island
Date	14 August 1264
Location	Off Saseno, Albania
Result	Genoese victory; Most of the Venetian convoy captured or sunk

Belligerents
Republic of Venice	Republic of Genoa

Commanders and leaders
Michele Duaro	Simone Grillo

Strength
13 taride cargo galleys 2 light galleys 1 saetta scouting galley 1 panzone transport ship 3 navi transport ships	16 galleys

Casualties and losses
12 taride captured 1 tarida burned 2 light galleys captured 1 nave captured 1 nave sunk Total: 17 ships lost	Unknown

The Battle of Saseno took place on 14 August 1264 near Saseno Island off the coast of Albania, between a fleet of the Republic of Genoa and a trade convoy of the Republic of Venice, during the War of Saint Sabas. Since the outbreak of the war in 1256, the Genoese had experienced only defeats in direct confrontations with the Venetian navy, and had therefore resorted to raiding the Venetian commerce convoys to the Levant that were critical to the Venetian economy.

In mid-1264, the Genoese commander, Simone Grillo, managed to trick his Venetian counterpart, Andrea Barozzi, as to his intentions: Grillo spread rumours that he intended to head due east to the Levant, but secretly took up station at the island of Malta, south of the usual sea lanes. When Barozzi took the bait and moved east to pursue Grillo with his much larger fleet, the latter was free to attack a Venetian convoy heading out from Venice to the Levant. Confident of the absence of any threat, the convoy commander, Michele Duaro, was caught by surprise when he encountered the Genoese fleet off Saseno. The much more manoeuvreable Genoese galleys captured or sank most of the convoy's slow-moving merchant ships, except for the giant cargo vessel (nave) Roccafortis. Duaro rallied his crews there for safety, abandoning the other ships in the process. The trade goods captured by the Genoese were estimated at 100,000 Genoese liras. Venice was able to destroy the Genoese fleet two years later, however, and in 1270 the two states concluded a truce that ended the war.

== Background ==
The War of Saint Sabas, between the rival Italian maritime republics of Venice and Genoa, broke out in 1256, over access to, and control of, the ports and markets of the Eastern Mediterranean. With its victories in the Battle of Acre in 1258 and the Battle of Settepozzi in 1263, the Venetian navy had demonstrated its superiority over its Genoese counterpart. Consequently, the Genoese avoided direct confrontations with the Venetian battle fleet and engaged in commerce raiding against Venetian merchant convoys.

During the 13th century, the Republic of Venice sent out two trade convoys (muda) to trade in the east each year, one in spring and one in late summer. Normally the convoys split up, one part heading into the Aegean Sea and what the Venetians called Romania—the lands of the Eastern Roman or Byzantine Empire—and the Black Sea, while the other sailed southeast to Alexandria and the port cities of the Levant (Oltremare). The importance of these convoys to the Venetian economy can hardly be overstated, as described by the Italian naval historian Camillo Manfroni:

Bales of costly wares and money were sent in it to the ports of Egypt and Asia; the dates of its departure and return were fixed by stern laws, and equally stern were the regulations as to the number of men on board each vessel; the commanders and captains were appointed by the Great Council; while in case of war the Senate pronounced the "Closing of the Sea" (Chiusura del Mare), a decree which forbade any vessel in the "caravan" from detaching itself from the main body. If at any time there was a suspicion of foes being encountered on the high seas, the "caravan" was escorted by galleys of war, and no precaution was omitted that made for the safety of this all-important and purely commercial expedition.

— Camillo Manfroni, translated by Alethea Wiel

After the Fourth Crusade sacked Constantinople in 1204 and founded the Latin Empire on the ruins of the Byzantine state, the Venetians held a privileged position in Romania, and through that to the Black Sea, almost to the exclusion of their traditional rivals, the Genoese and the Pisans. Venetian trade in Romania had been abruptly stopped since the recapture of Constantinople and the re-establishment of the Byzantine Empire under the Palaiologos dynasty in 1261: Constantinople and the straits leading to the Black Sea were now in the hands of the Byzantine emperor, Michael VIII Palaiologos, whose alliance with the Genoese included the obligation to keep their commercial rivals away from Byzantine-held lands and preventing passage into the Black Sea. As a result, the two annual convoys to the Levant were left as the only outlet for the Venetian merchants' activities.

== Preparations ==
In spring 1264, the Genoese prepared a new fleet with the intention, according to the official Genoese annals, the Annales Ianuenses, "to crush the Venetian enemies and to ensure the well-being and defend the Genoese sailing in different parts of the world". It comprised twenty galleys and two large navi, (Note: A nave, plural navi, was a type of large, broad-beamed cargo vessel equipped with lateen sails. Due to their size, high sides, and capacity to carry hundreds of marines, and even siege engines, they were almost impossible to defeat in battle except by another nave.) crewed by 3,500 men. The navi in particular were of exceptional size, and their construction had been financed by public funds, rather than by private contractors—usually the rich noble merchants who ran the city—as was normal practice.

The fleet was placed under the command of the pro-Ghibelline nobleman Simone Grillo. This led to fears among the rival Guelph party that he might use his new position for a coup that would make him dictator on the model of the only recently deposed Captain of the People, Guglielmo Boccanegra. The Guelph nobles joined together and attacked Grillo's house, and it took three days of negotiations before Grillo was able to secure terms that allowed him to take up his command. Grillo was forced to move to Porto Venere, at the southernmost extremity of Genoese territory, and there wait until the fleet was made ready. He was also assigned four experienced sailors as councillors, with the added task of keeping an eye on his conduct, among them Ogerio Scoto and Pietro di Camilla.

News of the Genoese preparations soon reached Venice, either through Grillo's political enemies or through the boasts of Genoese citizens. These reports greatly exaggerated the Genoese fleet's strength to as many as 90 galleys and six navi. Coupled with reports of extensive recruitment of mercenaries in Lombardy, the worried Venetian authorities delayed the sailing of the spring convoy, and prepared a large fleet of their own to counter the Genoese, with about 50 ships, mostly galleys, (Note: The mid-14th century Doge of Venice and chronicler Andrea Dandolo reports that the Venetian fleet numbered 50 galleys, while the Annales Ianuenses records 44 galleys plus a further eight navi and taride, and the contemporary Venetian chronicler Martino da Canal 47 galleys.) under Andrea Barozzi (or Barocio). The naval historian John Dotson considers it possible that the exaggerated reports of the Genoese fleet were leaked deliberately by agents of Grillo, so as to "draw the Venetian fleet out in a predictable fashion".

== Grillo deceives Barozzi ==
Grillo set sail in June, and headed swiftly south towards the island of Malta, where he arrived after a few days. On his stops along the way, he took care to announce his intention to sail directly to Acre in the Levant. Instead, he remained at Malta, much further south than the usual trade routes of the time, where his Venetian opponents might seek him. When Barozzi, reacting to the news of the Genoese fleet sailing, arrived at Sicily to intercept it, he only found rumours of its departure. According to some Venetian accounts, Grillo left behind a small vessel whose crew, when captured by the Venetians, informed them that the Genoese fleet had passed that way four days earlier, heading due east for the Levant.

Sites of the campaign in the Mediterranean Sea

Deceived, Barozzi led his fleet to pursue the Genoese, who were ostensibly heading east. At the same time, in Venice, the authorities, certain of Barozzi's eventual success given the past history of Venetian–Genoese naval encounters, and unwilling to risk losing the profits of the trade convoy, finally decided to allow it to depart on 1 August. It comprised 13 taride, (Note: A tarida, plural taride, was a galley used for carrying horses.) three navi, including the famously large Roccafortis, a panzone cargo ship, (Note: Stanton describes the panzone as "presumably a broad-beamed transport ship of some sort".) two light galleys, and a saetta scouting galley. The command of the convoy was entrusted to Michele Duaro. (Note: His last name is also given as 'Doro'.)

The moves of Barozzi's fleet became known to Grillo fairly quickly and with great accuracy, most likely through intelligence sources: the Venetian chronicler Martino da Canal claims that the Genoese had bribed a Trevisan notary of the Great Council, but Dotson suggests that the Genoese admiral may simply have availed himself of a network of agents along the coasts of Sicily. Once he was certain that Barozzi was out of the way, Grillo moved his fleet northeast. At about this point, Grillo decided to detach his two navi and three galleys and send them to trade in Tunisia, possibly after transferring their marines to the rest of his ships. Another galley was sent east, according to the Annales Ianuenses on a mission to Palaiologos, but according to Dotson most likely tasked with looking out for Barozzi's fleet. With the remaining 16 galleys, Grillo moved to the Strait of Otranto to await the Venetian trade convoy.

The account of the Annales Ianuenses—probably based on Grillo's own report to the Genoese authorities—justifies Grillo's movements after reaching Malta by claiming that intelligence gathered from a Messinese merchant ship returning from the Levant suggested that the situation there was adverse to Genoese interests, so that nothing profitable could be achieved. This has led modern historians to suggest that Grillo's original orders had been to sail to the Levant. However, his actions up to that point show that he was already committed to an alternative plan aiming at striking the Venetian convoy, and the story of the Messinese ship may simply have been invented as a justification for deviating from the orders he had pledged to follow. As with the Venetian claims of Genoese deception and espionage, Dotson opines, it is impossible to determine the truth, especially since the sources are "unclear on the exact timing and even the sequence of events, in an operation in which timing was very important".

== Battle ==
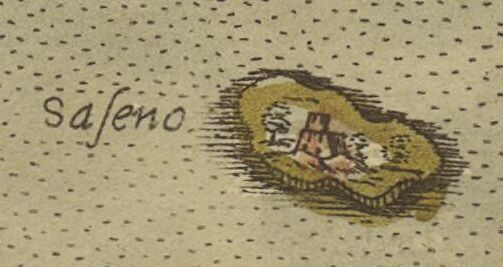
Map of Sazan island in 1571

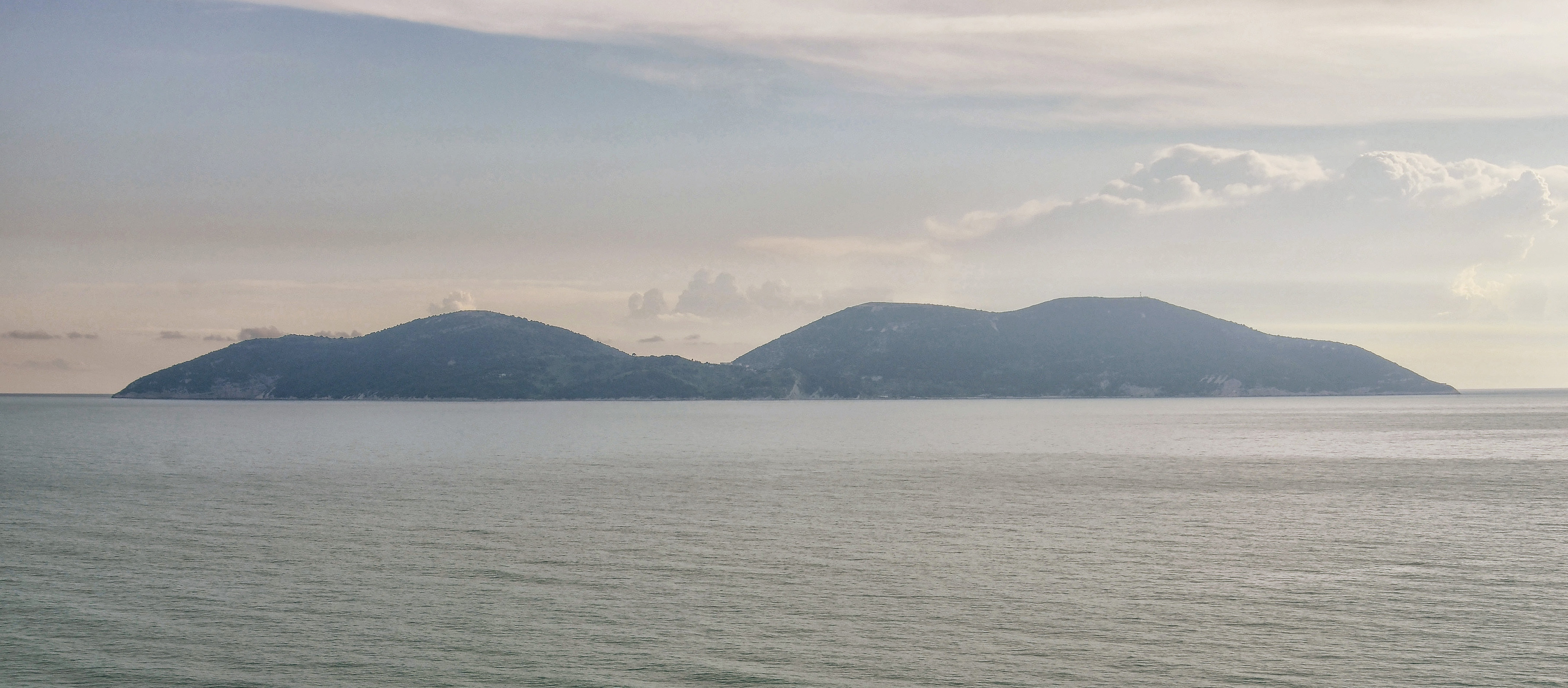
View of Sazan

The commander of the Venetian convoy, Duaro, appears to have made slow progress, confident of the absence of any threat to his ships. On 14 August, off the island of Saseno (today Sazan Island, Albania), at the narrowest part of the Strait of Otranto, Grillo encountered the Venetian convoy. The Venetians were in a difficult situation: the large and ponderous taride, loaded with goods, and with at most 40 armed soldiers each, were no match for the swift and agile Genoese galleys, each with a crew of about 150 men (c. 100 rowers and 50 soldiers).

The medieval sources report that Duaro and his crews were initially dismissive of the Genoese: the Venetians threw chickens in front of the Genoese vessels and shouted "fight with them!". The fighting began in the evening and culminated around midnight. The Venetian ships clustered around the Roccafortis, which towered above the other vessels like a castle. As the Genoese pressed their attack on the smaller Venetian vessels, Duaro eventually ordered their crews to abandon them and gather on the Roccafortis, bringing along what valuable goods they could carry. The Venetian sources claim that the departing crews sank many of their taride, while the Genoese, who approached with caution, wary of a trap, captured the rest. The Annales Ianuenses on the other hand reports that all the lighter ships were captured, apart from a nave, which was sunk, and a tarida which was lost to fire.

While the rest of the convoy was overwhelmed, the Roccafortis held firm. The Genoese promised to safeguard the lives of its crew if they surrendered, but Duaro refused, claiming that the ship was laden with gold, and inviting the Genoese to come and take it. The Genoese then launched a fireship against it, but the Venetians managed to drive it off. In the end, a favourable wind allowed the Roccafortis to escape pursuit and find refuge in the southern Adriatic port of Ragusa.

== Impact ==
The battle was a major success for the Genoese. The loss to the Venetians amounted to more than 100,000 Genoese pounds, over and above the interruption of trade altogether for the rest of the year; the Genoese treasury gained 30,000 pounds through the sale of the plunder. This was an enormous sum for the period: for comparison, in the 1250s, a taride is recorded to have been sold for 190 Genoese pounds, a galley for between 280 and 350 pounds, and a nave for 420 to 800 pounds. Equally important was the blow to Venetian prestige and morale, for which Duaro found himself confronted with accusations of cowardice. As Manfroni points out, his was a grossly unequal fight; and ultimately Duaro preferred saving the lives of his fleet's crews—and the not inconsiderable treasures carried by the Roccafortis—to a doomed fight to the end. The wrath of Doge Reniero Zeno was somewhat lessened when he learned that no Venetians were made prisoners during the evacuation of the taride, and that Duaro was not well assisted by his subaltern officers. As Dotson writes, "This operation [...] reflects both the strengths and weaknesses of the Genoese and Venetian capacity for war in the mid-thirteenth century. It also illustrates the part played by intelligence-gathering, rumor, and disinformation in a campaign."

== Aftermath ==
In the meantime, Barozzi was pressing on eastwards, searching in vain for Grillo's fleet. Arriving at the port city of Tyre on 2 September, he encountered a Genoese merchantman, the Oliva, carrying 11,000 bezants worth of silk, in the harbour. With the Genoese fleet nowhere in sight, Barozzi resolved to seize the ship, despite the warnings of the city's lord, Philip of Montfort, a Genoese ally, that he would confiscate double the amount in Venetian properties if they did so. Barozzi did not hesitate long: he not only captured the Oliva, but also began a siege of Tyre itself, in the hopes of depriving Genoa of access to the city, which at the time was the second-most important commercial entrepôt of the Levant. The Venetians had to interrupt the siege after a few days, when news of the events at Saseno reached them. Instead, Barozzi hurried to Acre to escort the previous year's returning convoy back to Venice.

Important as it was, the Genoese success at Saseno proved ephemeral: in 1266, the Venetians captured the entire Genoese battle fleet at the Battle of Trapani. Meanwhile, Michael VIII Palaiologos grew increasingly dissatisfied with the poor Genoese performance against the Venetians, and distrustful of their loyalty. In 1264, he expelled the Genoese from Constantinople and sought a rapprochement with Venice that culminated in a provisional non-aggression pact in 1265, although it was not ratified until three years later. The stalemate between Venice and Genoa continued, until in 1269 King Louis IX of France, keen to use the Venetian and Genoese fleets in his planned Eighth Crusade, coerced both to conclude peace in the Treaty of Cremona.
