= Simone Grillo =

Genoese politician and admiral

- Relatives: Famiglia del Grillo
- Military career
- Allegiance: Republic of Genoa
- Rank: Admiral
- Conflicts: War of Saint Sabas; Battle of Saseno

Simone Grillo was a Genoese politician and admiral of the 13th century who belonged to one of the most influential noble families of the Republic of Genoa and would serve as a commander at the Battle of Saseno.

== Biography ==
Grillo was born to the Genoese noble family of del Grillo some time in the first half of the 13th century. His father, Frederico was the agent of Emperor Frederick II in the Republic of Genoa. His family had connections to Pope Innocent IV, who was a son of a Grillo family member; and the Fieschi family, among other allies.

Coat of Arms of the del Grillo family

The earliest historical records of Grillo identify him as one of the Genoese citizens who were present in Santa Igia in November of 1256 while negotiating the terms of the Sardinian swearing of allegiance to the Republic of Genoa. This diplomatic role would lead to Grillo's service in the legislature under the Captain of the People, Guglielmo Boccanegra; a position that he would retake in July of 1262 after the fall of Boccanegra, which would see him join in the negotiations with Charles of Anjou.

By 1263 Genoa needed to reinvest in its navy following a major defeat in Sapienza. The new fleet was to be led by commanded by Grillo, who was selected via an election. Prior to taking command of the fleet, Grillo was known to be a pro-Ghibelline nobleman. This alignment resulted in fears amongst rivals of the Guelph party who feared Grillo would establish himself as a dictator, like the recently deposed Boccanegra. The Guelph nobles joined together and attacked Grillo's house, It took three days of negotiations before Grillo was able to secure terms that allowed him to take up his command.

In 1264, Grillo set sail to fight Venice. He led his galleys to Sicily and began spreading disinformation through Genoa's agents. His men claimed that the fleet was travelling to the Holy Land, but remained in Messina until certain the Venetians had mispositioned themselves off of Syria. He would then take the fleet to Malta and split off some of his ships. Grillo then ordered his fleet of galleys to Saseno, near Durazzo, to ambush a Venetian trade fleet traveling between Alexandria and Venice. He would spring his trap on the Venetian forces, winning out the Battle of Saseno.

Following the victory, Grillo returned to Genoa bearing plunder and resigned command of the fleet which had been entrusted to him. After 1289 he fell out of favor and the date and place of his death are no longer known.
