= Roccafortis =

13th-century European warship

The Roccafortis or Roccaforte (Italian for "strong fortress") was a 13th-century warship built in Venice. A "round ship", it was considered one of the largest built in the 13th century, and saw service with the Republic of Venice and the Kingdom of France.

== History ==
Roccafortis was built in Venice (some sources say at the Venetian Arsenal) in the mid 13th-century. She was laid down as a round ship, and was often outfitted for war. The exact role of the ship is disputed; some sources note the ship was used to defend Venice's Levant trade, and she has been placed at the Battle of Saseno in 1264 between the Venetian and Genoese navies. At Saseno, Roccafortis' size ensured that she was the only Venetian survivor of the battle, as the smaller Genoese ships were unable to capture the large vessel.

Other sources state the ship was constructed in 1268 at the behest of King Louis IX of France, who was amassing forces for the Eighth Crusade of 1270. In an essay on Venetian ships supplied to France during the Eighth Crusade, French naval historian Auguste Jal noted that Roccafortis was the largest of said ships. Jal also examined Latin documents detailing the design of the vessel.

=== Dimensions ===
Roccafortis was remarkably large, though sources differ on its exact size. Auguste Jal and several later historians noted that ship had a 70 feet (21 m) long keel, and an overall length of 110 feet (34 m), with a width at prow and poop of 40 feet (12 m); other historians criticize this approximation of the ship's size as unrealistic. Historian Charles Stanton records the ship's length as 38.3 metres (126 ft), while Frederic Lane notes that the ship further had a forecastle and an aftcastle that were another 12 metres (39 ft) high. One French source, based on an examination of French–Sicilian records from the Eighth Crusade, noted that the Roccaforte likely displaced 450 tons.

== Sources ==
- Carr Laughton, L. G. (1956). "The Roccafortis of Venice, 1268". The Mariner's Mirror. 42 (4): 267–278. doi:10.1080/00253359.1956.10658313. ISSN 0025-3359.
- Dotson, John E. (2006). "Ship types and fleet composition at Genoa and Venice in the early thirteenth century". In Pryor, John (ed.). Logistics of Warfare in the Age of the Crusades: Proceedings of a Workshop Held at the Centre for Medieval Studies, University of Sydney, 30 September to 4 October 2002. Aldershot: Ashgate Publishing, Ltd. pp. 63–76. ISBN 978-0-7546-5197-0.
- Dotson, John E. (2008). "Everything is a Compromise: Mediterranean Ship Design, Thirteenth to Sixteenth Centuries". In Bork, Robert Odell; Kann, Andrea (eds.). The Art, Science, and Technology of Medieval Travel. Ashgate Publishing, Ltd. pp. 31–53. ISBN 978-0-7546-6307-2.
- Holmes, Sir George Charles Vincent (1906). Ancient and Modern Ships. H. M. Stationery Office.
- Fletcher, R. A. (1911). Warships and Their Story. Cassell, Limited.
- Stanton, Charles D. (2015). Medieval Maritime Warfare. Barnsley, South Yorkshire: Pen and Sword. ISBN 978-1-4738-5643-1.
