= Oberto Spinola =

Italian politician

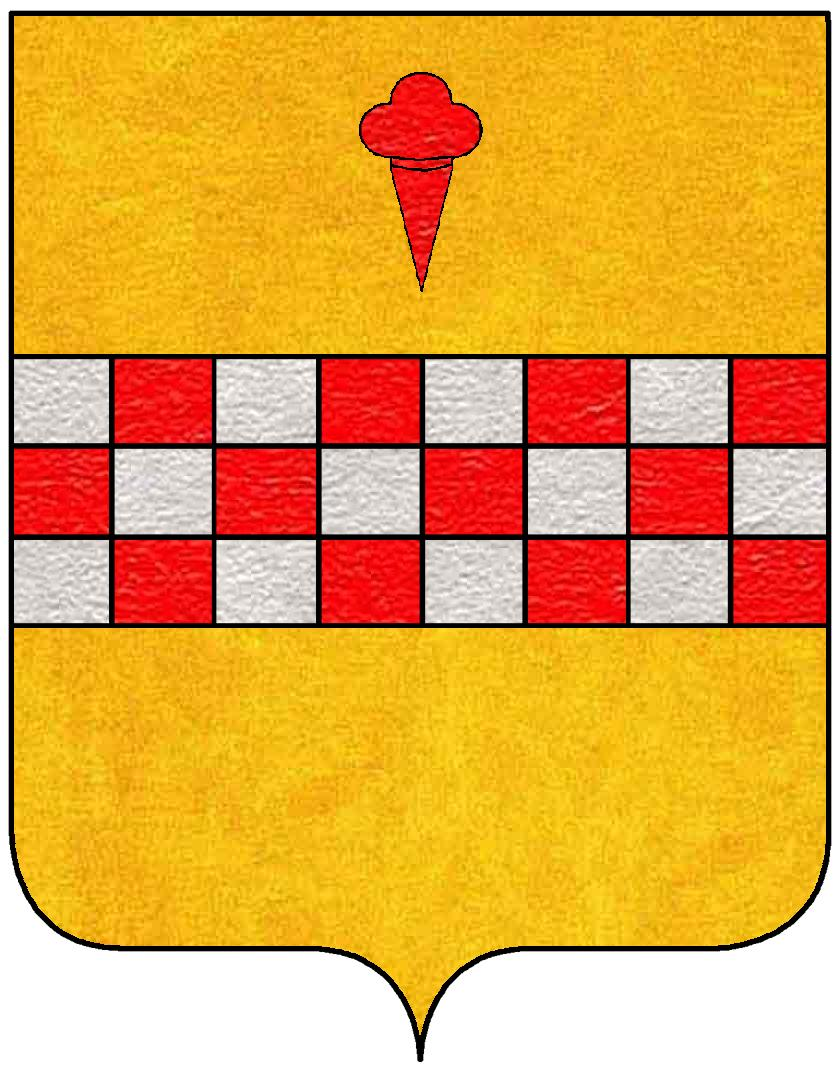

Capitano del Popolo of the Republic of Genoa
- In office October 28, 1270 – 1291
- Preceded by: Oberto Doria
- Succeeded by: Lanfranco Suardi

Personal details
- Born: Genoa, Republic of Genoa
- Died: Genoa, Republic of Genoa

Oberto Spinola was an Italian politician, a leader of the Republic of Genoa in the 13th century, between 1270 and 1291.

== Biography ==
Born in Genoa, he was a member of the Spinola Family. In 1270 he started a co-dictatorship with Oberto Doria. His son Corrado fought in the successful Battle of Meloria (1284) which destroyed the power of Pisa, then Genoa's main rival in the Mediterranean Sea together with Venice.

In 1275 he was capitano del popolo in Asti, and perhaps he took part in the battle of Roccavione of the same year, which marked the end of the Guelph-Angevine party south of Piedmont. He also directed the construction of San Damiano d'Asti, a new city built by the Asti people.

In 1291, Spinola started the construction of the Ducal Palace in Genoa.

== See also ==
- Republic of Genoa
- House of Spinola
