= Oberto Doria =

Italian admiral and politician

- Coat of arms of the Doria family

Capitano del popolo of the Republic of Genoa
- In office 1270–1288
- Preceded by: Guglielmo Boccanegra
- Succeeded by: Corrado Doria

Personal details
- Born: 1229 Genoa, Republic of Genoa
- Died: 1306 (aged 76–77) Genoa, Republic of Genoa

Oberto Doria (died 1306) was an Italian politician and admiral of the Republic of Genoa, ruling the republic as Capitano del popolo.

== Biography ==
Oberto Doria was born at Genoa before 1230, the oldest of four sons of Pietro Doria and Mabilia Casiccia. He was thus a member of the powerful Doria family, and the brother of Lamba Doria, who defeated the Venetians in the War of Curzola, and of the chronicler Iacopo Doria.

=== Early commercial and political career ===
The Doria family, one of the most powerful dynasties in the history of Genoa, was always related to the political events of the Genoese Republic, however, Oberto's father, Pietro, chose to remain neutral. This allowed him to establish a flourishing trading company with his partner, Poncio Riccio. Oberto spent his youth as his father's assistant, before becoming an independent merchant. Surviving documents show the diversity of his mercantile activities, from c. 1250 on, stretching from France to North Africa, often in close partnership with his father and the Riccios. At the same time, he began to participate in Genoese political life, from an exceptionally privileged position: not only were both his father and grandfather Oberto were members of the Great Council, but the podestà (the city's chief magistrate) at that time resided in the palace of the Doria family. As a result, Oberto is attested as consiliator of the Commune at the conclusion of a treaty on 22 March 1252, in the acts of sending an ambassador to Florence on 15 July 1254, and in a treaty with Santa Igia on 17 November 1256.

=== First naval command ===
Following the defeat and capture of the Genoese fleet under Lanfranco Borbonino at the Battle of Trapani on 23 June, Oberto assumed his first naval command, being placed in charge of a fleet of 25 ships. This appointment, according to the Annali Genovesi, was due to his popularity with the mercantile classes, who had reason to be dissatisfied with the scant successes of the Guelph faction following the fall of the capitano del popolo Guglielmo Boccanegra. As the historian Giovanni Nuti points out, the branch of the Doria family established by Oberto's namesake grandfather was closely identified with the commercial interests of Genoa itself, as opposed to other traditional noble families that pursued the acquisition of possessions outside the city itself, in the Italian Riviera or the islands of the Tyrrhenian Sea.

Taking advantage of the victorious Venetian fleet's inactivity at Venice, Oberto sailed in early August and moved east. After capturing some Venetian merchant vessels, his fleet sacked the town of Canea on Crete (then a Venetian colony), sometime in September. On his return journey, his fleet encountered the Venetian trade convoy sailing east at Modon, protected by Marco Zeno's thirty galleys. Numerically inferior and encumbered with the loot and captives of Canea, Oberto avoided combat and fled. Despite having the advantage over his enemy, Zeno was content to see the Genoese retreating, and did not pursue them. After offloading his booty at Messina, Oberto returned home. Although the principal naval objective, the Venetian trade convoy, had eluded him, his sack of Canea boosted morale following successive defeats at the hands of the Venetians.

=== Ruling the Republic ===
On 28 October 1270, together with Oberto Spinola, member of another important Genoese family, inaugurated a series of two-man governments headed by their families, with dictatorial powers as the captains of the people (Capitano del popolo). Ruling for 15 years during what has been termed the golden age of the Genoese in the Middle Ages.

His moves aimed to defend the Genoese Republic's integrity against the Fieschi family, who wanted to create a personal seignory in the Levante Ligure, and the Grimaldi, who had usurped part of the Ponente. He personally moved against Nicolò Fieschi in 1273, storming his capital La Spezia, while his brother Jacopo, at the same time, warred victoriously against the Grimaldi.

At the same time, he led a prudent conduct against the French Charles of Anjou, then King of Naples and Sicily and also a powerful feudatory in north-western Italy and Provence. Oberto Doria rose to fame however as the admiral of the Genoese fleet in the Battle of Meloria (6 August 1284) in which, together with Benedetto Zaccaria and Corrado Spinola (son of his co-dictator Oberto Spinola) he crushed the Pisans, then Genoa's main rivals in the maritime trades in the Mediterranean together with Venice. This victory allowed Genoa to regain Corsica and Sardinia, and reduced Pisa to a secondary status in the Mediterranean Sea

In 1285 he renounced voluntarily to co-dictatorship, but maintained a role in the Genoese politics. The peace with Pisa was signed in his house on 15 April 1288.

Oberto Doria died sometime shortly before 6 September 1306.

== Sources ==
- Balard, Michel (2017). "1284 - Oberto Doria, amiral génois, écrase la flotte de Pise à la bataille de la Meloria". Gênes et la mer — Genova e il mare (PDF) (in French). Genova: Società Ligure di Storia Patria. pp. 215–225. ISBN 978-88-97099-42-0.
- Manfroni, Camillo (1902). Storia della marina italiana, dal Trattato di Ninfeo alla caduta di Constantinopoli (1261–1453) [History of the Italian Navy, from the Treaty of Nymphaeum to the Fall of Constantinople (1261–1453)] (in Italian). Livorno: R. Accademia navale. OCLC 265927738.
- Nuti, Giovanni (1992). "DORIA, Oberto". Dizionario Biografico degli Italiani (in Italian). Vol. 41: Donaggio–Dugnani. Rome: Istituto dell'Enciclopedia Italiana. ISBN 978-88-12-00032-6.
