= Camillo Manfroni =

Italian historian

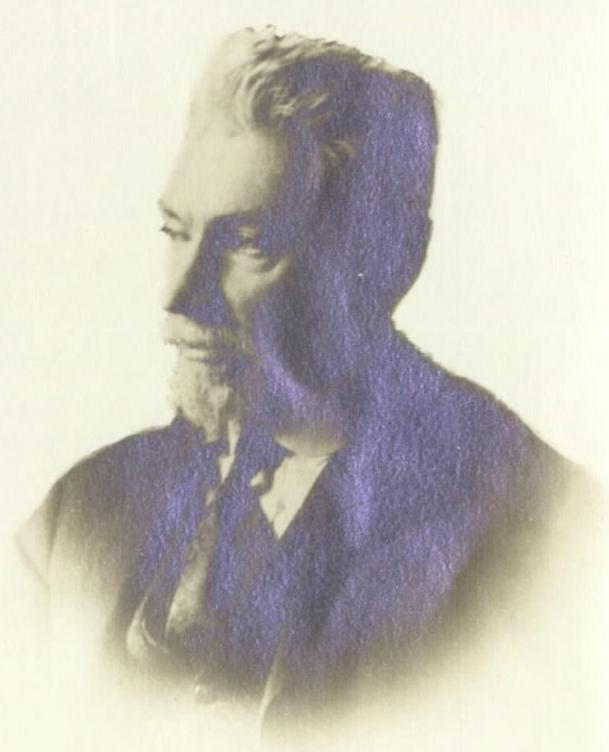
- Camillo Manfroni
- Born: June 13, 1863; Cuneo, Kingdom of Italy
- Died: June 16, 1935 (aged 72); Rome, Italian Empire
- Occupations: Historian; author; politician
- Scientific career
- Fields: Historiography
- Workplaces: Naval Academy in Livorno

Camillo Manfroni (June 13, 1863 – June 16, 1935) was an Italian historian, author and politician.

== Biography ==
Manfroni was born in Cuneo, Italy on June 13, 1863. His parents were Giuseppe and Annunziata Cotta Morandini. His father was a police officer.

He completed degrees in Literature and Philosophy.

He died in Rome, Italy on June 16, 1935.

== Career ==
For many years, he taught history and literature at the Naval Academy in Livorno and was one of the founders of the Naval League.

He subsequently held the chair of modern history at the universities of Genoa, Padua, and Rome.

He served as Senator of the Kingdom of Italy from May 14, 1929 to June 16, 1935.

== Bibliography ==
He is the author of a number of notable books:

- Il Banco di San Giorgio; l'antico debito pubblico genovese e la Casa di S. Giorgio. La marina di Genova. S. Giorgio e i possedimenti coloniali e di terraferma. Il palazzo della società e le sue dipendenze
- La marine militare del granducato Mediceo. Parte 1
- Storia della marina italiana ... 400–1261
- Storia del reame di Napoli dal 1734 al 1825
- Sulla soglia del Vaticano, 1870–1901
